= Drag in France =

National history of art form

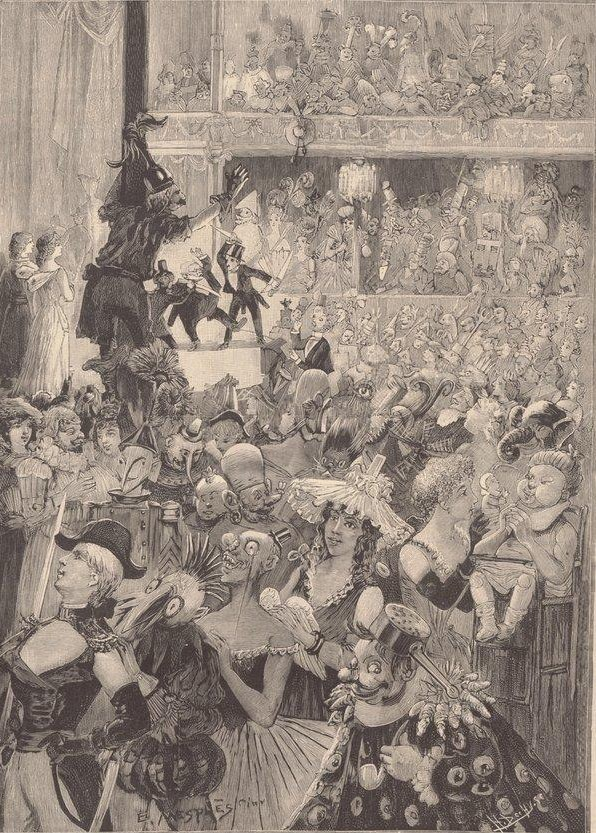
Bal des Incohérents, Folies Bergère, during the Paris Carnival. Drawing by Paul Eugène Mesplès in Le Monde illustré, January 31, 1891

In France, drag performance was initially limited to cabarets such as Madame Arthur and Le Carrousel de Paris, but cross-dressing shows spread throughout the second half of the 20th century and experienced a first golden age at the turn of the 21st century. After that, there came a period in which drag was a much less public but much more politically engaged practice, especially with the establishment of the French chapter of the Sisters of Perpetual Indulgence, before it experienced a resurgence in popularity following the success of RuPaul's Drag Race and Drag Race France. This popularity created new economic opportunities for drag artists but had the effect of emphasizing the more spectacular but less political elements of drag.

== History ==
=== Early 20th century: Cabaret ===
In France as elsewhere, it is difficult to trace the precise origins of drag, because cross-dressing and gender-defying performance precede the term "drag" and drag artists claim affiliation with ancient practices. Thus, Nicky Doll places the origins of drag in France with the Chevalière d'Éon and, more generally, the refined aesthetics of the Court of Versailles, while journalists Apolline Bazin and Sofian Aissaoui place it with vaudeville and cabaret, respectively.

If drag culture in the strict sense was born in the United States and gained particular popularity in the 1980s, France was home to forms of theatrical cross-dressing throughout the 20th century, whether in Paris's cabaret culture or through the actions of the Mirabelles and Gazolines of the 1970s. This cabaret culture, particularly at Madame Arthur and Le Carrousel, also gave rise to the first visibility of transgender women in France. Another cabaret, Elle et Lui, targeted a lesbian audience and featured a mix of cross-dressing women, butch lesbians, and trans men. A 1949 law prohibiting cabaret performers from performing in wigs, breast forms, dresses, or heels meant that trans women found themselves with more job opportunities than cross-dressing men.

=== 1950s to 1970s: Queens and aunts ===
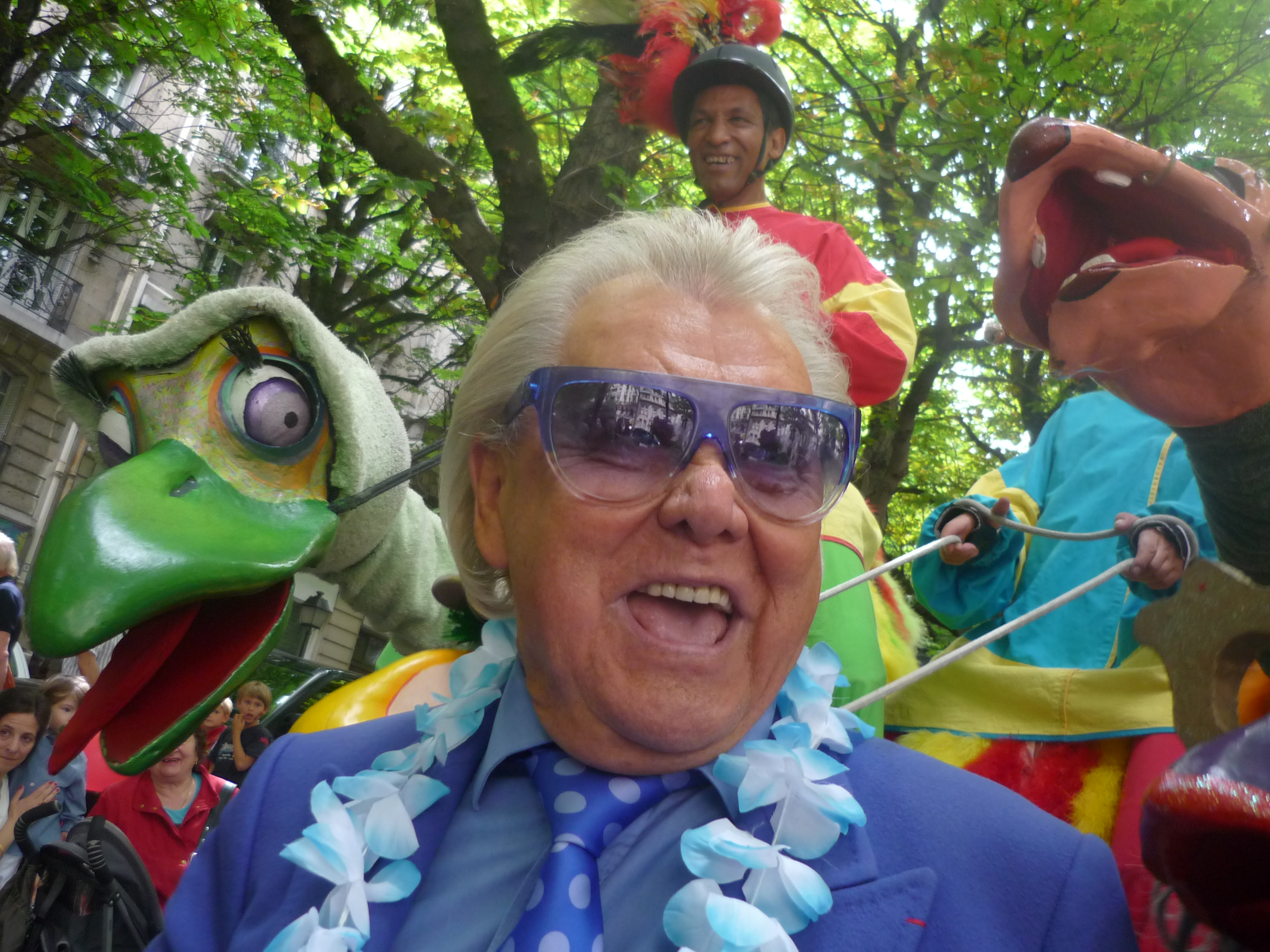
Michou, director of Chez Michou and prominent figure in French cross-dressing entertainment in the second half of the 20th century

The evolution from "transvestite" to "drag queen" took place during the second half of the 20th century. It occurred through the intermediary of the term reine ("queen"), used both as a derogatory term to denigrate gay men and as a recurring part of drag characters' names; for example, writer Jean Genet, in his work, created the personas of the "Reine de Roumanie" (Queen of Romania) and "Reine-Oriane". This linguistic shift also decoupled the vocabulary from the artist's identity: while a "transvestite" is necessarily a man, a drag queen can be a person of any gender. For example, La Briochée is a drag queen and a trans woman.

Following the success of La Cage aux Folles in the 1970s, Alain Marcel decided to write the musical Essayez donc nos pédalos in order to paint a more faithful portrait of male homosexuality and transgender identity through a cross-dressing show. The play became a cult classic and was performed hundreds of times in France, as well as in Canada, Belgium, and Switzerland. The Mirabelles, a theatre troupe, also performed cross-dressing performances during the 1970s, which Frédéric Martel later described as drag shows.

=== 1980s and 1990s: First golden age of drag queens and emergence of drag kings ===
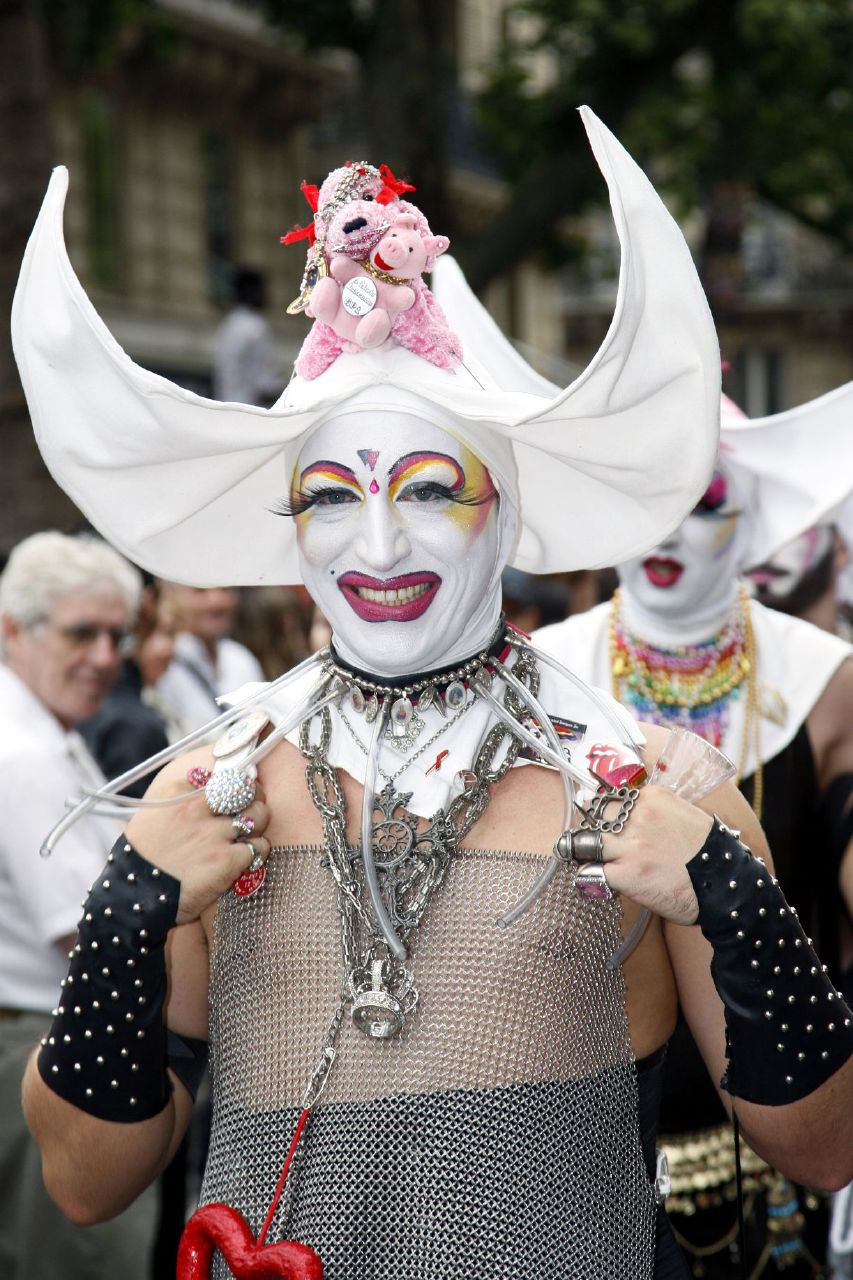
Soeur Innocenta of the Sisters of Perpetual Indulgence at the 2007 Paris Pride march

Although transvestite cabarets continued to exist in the second half of the 20th century, the most famous of which was Chez Michou in Montmartre, the development of drag in the 1980s and 1990s, particularly in Paris, meshed well with the libertarian spirit that dominated in French nightlife at the time. Drag queens organized with their local networks of hairstylists, stylists, and so on, then appeared at gay parties in Paris: Mercedes at the French Kiss parties at Le Palace, Tyra and Tonya at the Banana Café, and La Chose at Gibus. The massive success of the Australian film Priscilla, Queen of the Desert, released in 1994, caused an explosion in popularity for drag queens. Suddenly, drag queens could be paid up to 1,500 francs per party and were invited on television. The electronic music group Sister Queen released the song "Let Me Be a Drag Queen", and Mylène Farmer sang Sans contrefaçon in concert with drag dancers.

Drag of this era was done with few resources, and the artists sourced their equipment from sex shops in Pigalle. The release of Judith Butler's Gender Trouble, which used drag as an example to theorize gender performativity, coincided with a shift in which drag took on more directly political elements. For example, the Sisters of Perpetual Indulgence, an international activist group that has had a chapter in France since 1991, were present at all French pride marches. For the Sisters, as for many drag queens of the 1990s, issues of visibility and the fight against HIV were central to drag practice. In 1994, Marianne James created the musical L'Ultima Récital, in which she played the drag queen Ulrika von Glott, a Nazi diva; this character served to denounce the rise of the far right in France, in particular the National Front. Due to Ulrika's large build and her popularity with the gay public, which resulted in confusion between drag practice and cross-dressing, rumours circulated that Ulrika was in fact played by a man. The visibility of the character was not well received by all gay people, and some gay men, operating from a homonormative perspective, subsequently criticized drag queens for promoting a caricatured and effeminate image of homosexuality.

The increased popularity of drag queens eventually led to a slowdown in the market: as more people became involved in drag, and sometimes performed for free, artists' fees decreased significantly. Drag shows intended for a wealthy heterosexual male audience also began to hire drag artists in order to subject them to the audience's homophobia. During this period of lower income for drag queens, many artists temporarily stopped performing in order to transition.

Emerging in France in the mid-1990s, the drag king scene remains fairly limited in the country compared to what can be found in London or the United States. The first drag king workshop in France was organized by Paul B. Preciado and took place in Paris in June 2002. Preciado was later joined in this endeavour by Sam Bourcier, Louis(e) de Ville, Camille Emmanuelle, Victor Le Maure, and Viktor Marzuk in Paris, and Rachele Borghi and Arnaud Alessandrin in Bordeaux. These workshops were often linked to lesbian and feminist communities; for example, in 2004, a drag king workshop was held at the lesbian and feminist bookstore Violette and Co and was followed by a fashion show at Cineffable, a lesbian film organization. The inclusion of drag kings in lesbian communities was sometimes controversial, with other community members accusing them of spreading toxic masculinity and demanding they be excluded from lesbian cultural events.

In the 2010s, Chriss Lag devoted two documentaries to drag kings in France. The first, portrait d'une bad girl!, was specifically about Louis(e) de Ville, and the second, Drag Kings, focused on drag kings more generally.

=== 2010s and 2020s: Renaissance ===
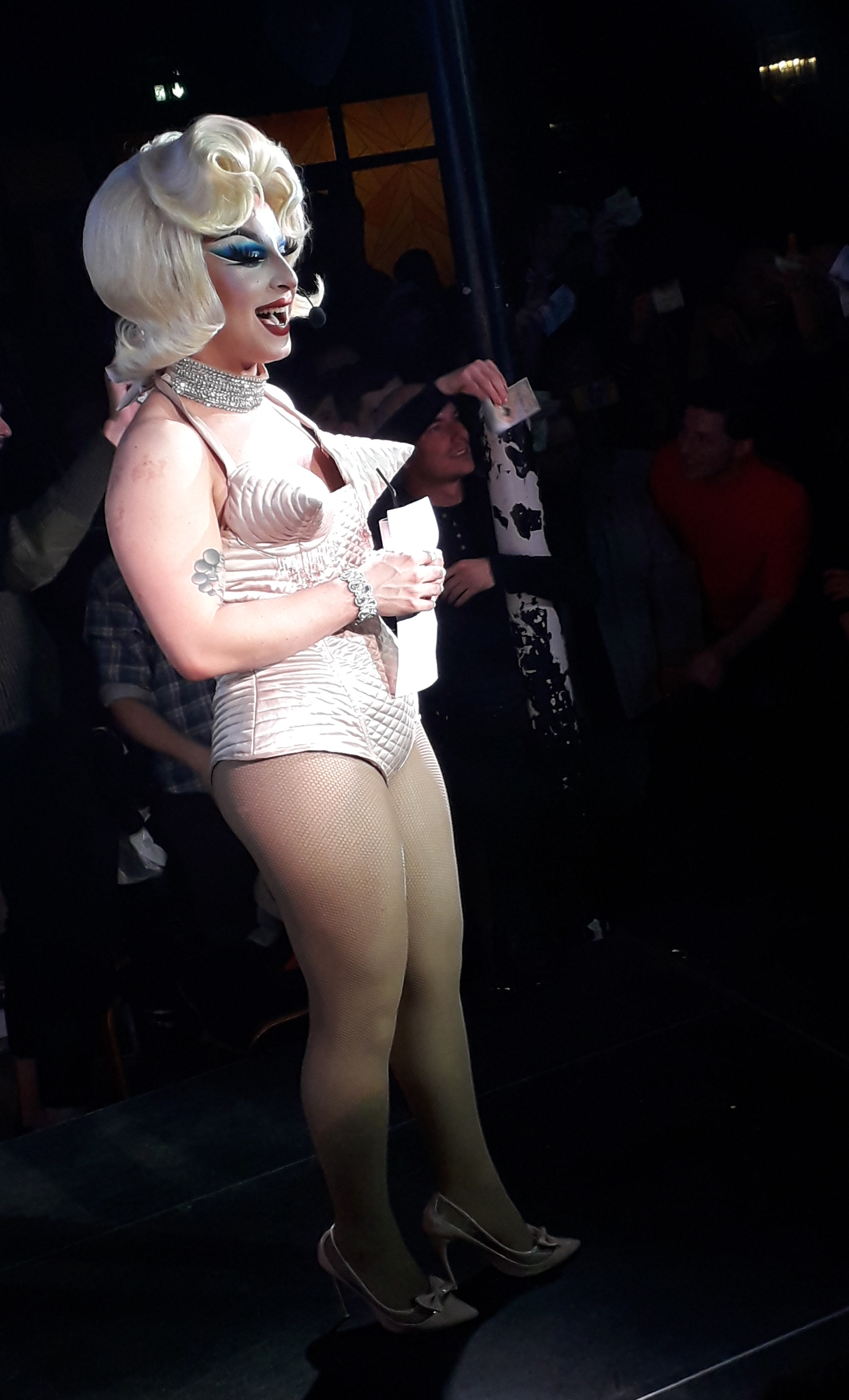
Cookie Kunty at the Paris dragathon on 14 April 2019

The French drag scene experienced a renaissance thanks to the increased visibility provided by RuPaul's Drag Race, which became available on Netflix in France in 2014. In 2020, Nicky Doll became the first French participant on the show, bringing international media coverage to drag queens in France. Some television channels, like Arte and Canal+, offer original programs with French drag artists that sometimes highlight drag queens from outside the cultural centres of French drag (i.e., Lille, Paris, and Lyon); this has promoted the expansion of the drag scene to other parts of the country, particularly Toulouse, Bordeaux, and Marseille. This expansion is also a reaction to the media space taken by the anti-LGBTQ organization La Manif pour tous. Additionally, it promotes more positive, festive spaces for LGBTQ people to socialize outside of demonstrations for things like marriage equality or lesbian reproductive rights.

The spread of drag culture has also been accompanied by its institutionalization; some municipalities, like Bordeaux, provide funding for drag shows during Pride Month. Drag in the 2010s was also politicized around queer theory, particularly the notion of gender performance. Gender theorists like Teresa de Lauretis, Judith Butler, or Sam Bourcier were invoked by drag queens as inspirations, and other drag queens, who got into drag through cross-dressing, found political ideas circulating in the drag scene that then influenced their work. These ideas were then shared with a wider public through the organization of DragQueer lectures.

The drag renaissance centred around artists playing the role of drag mother, who helped budding artists build networks and perfect their craft. Cookie Kunty played this role in Paris, for example, as did Crystal Chardonnay in Lille.

=== 2022 to present: After Drag Race France ===
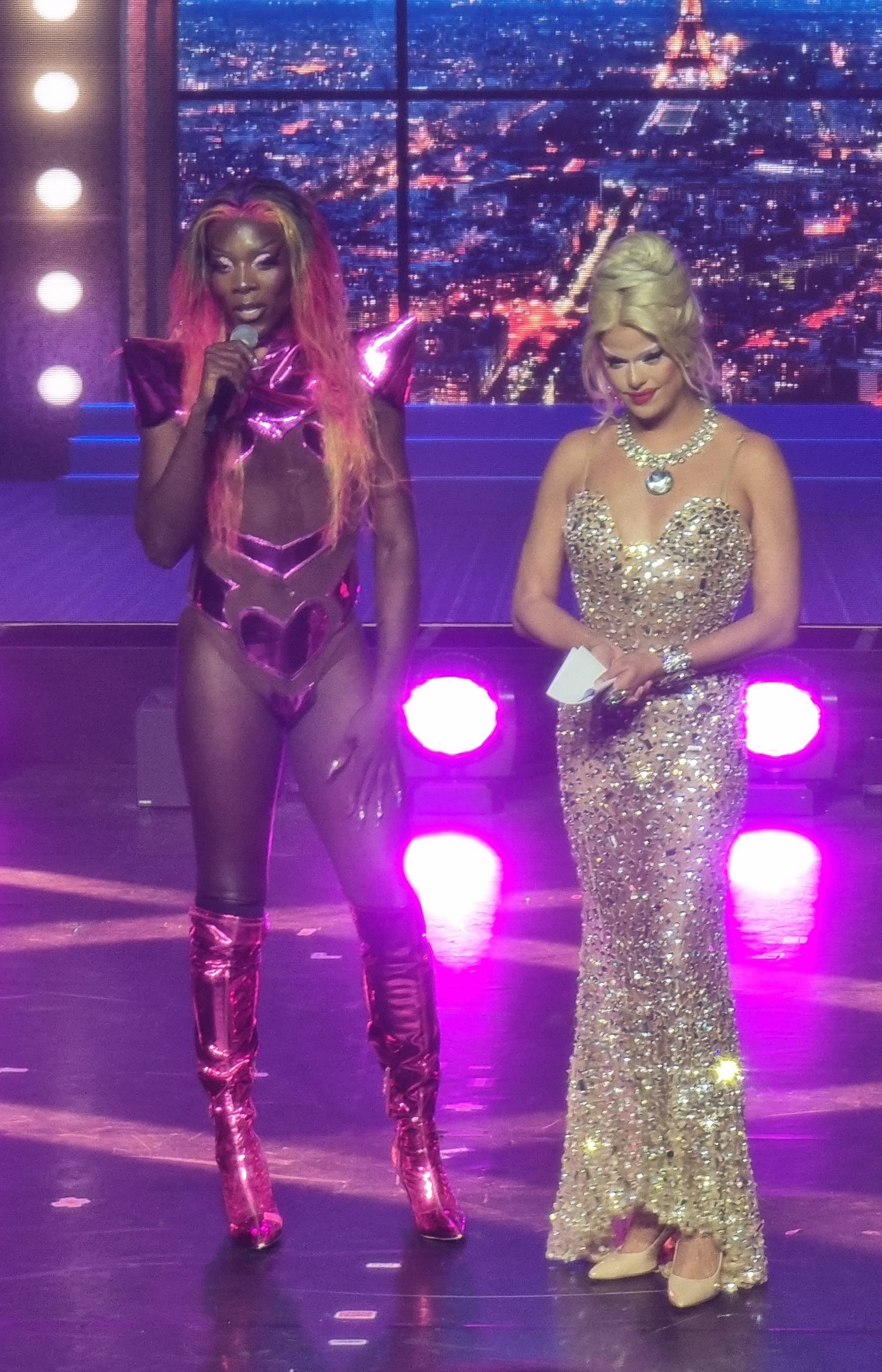
Keiona, season 2 winner of Drag Race France, alongside host Nicky Doll during the 2023 Drag Race France tour at the Folies Bergère

France Télévision launched Drag Race France in June 2022. Hosted by Nicky Doll, Kiddy Smile, and Daphné Bürki, the first season featured ten drag queen participants: La Kahena, Lova Ladiva, La Briochée, Kam Hugh, Elips, La Big Bertha, Lolita Banana, La Grande Dame, Soa de Muse, and Paloma. The French edition of the Drag Race franchise was the first to include drag kings, although they were not competitors. Eleven drag queens participated in the second season, and another ten in season three.

Many of the artists appearing on Drag Race France have gone on to embark on musical careers. While queens in the United States produce music for gay bars, the French drag public is eclectic in its musical tastes; this makes it more difficult to make the transition from one art to another, but also allows artists to find their niches in different genres. For example, Piche began a musical career in rap, La Grande Dame in electro, Paloma in 1980s-style pop, and Soa de Muse in more experimental productions.

Drag Race France democratized drag: no longer seen by the general public as strange creatures arousing hostility, drag queens are now more often identified as drag artists. Nicky Doll, Paloma and Piche, alongside Giselle Palmer and Barbara Butch, participated in the opening ceremony of the 2024 Olympic Games in Paris. In May 2024, Miss Martini became the first drag queen to carry the Olympic flame, followed by Minima Gesté.

Despite increased visibility leading to increased economic opportunities for drag artists in France, some drag artists, notably drag kings, have lamented the fact that Drag Race showcases only one type of drag, which has consequently become a norm to which French drag artists are expected to conform. For example, drag king practices like rap and stand-up, which are rarely shown in Drag Race, have become less popular as artists emphasize practices valued in Drag Race, like lipsync and physical performance. Artists have also criticized a perceived depoliticization of drag, with Enza Fragola citing the example of Café Beaubourg, a hotspot for Drag Race viewing parties, which does not invite artists (like the queens of Sidragtion) who engage in political action. This phenomenon is reinforced by a less radical public that sees drag as entertainment, not as a vector for political messages. For some artists, performing in bars is no also longer seen as a goal in itself, but as a stepping stone to appearing on Drag Race.

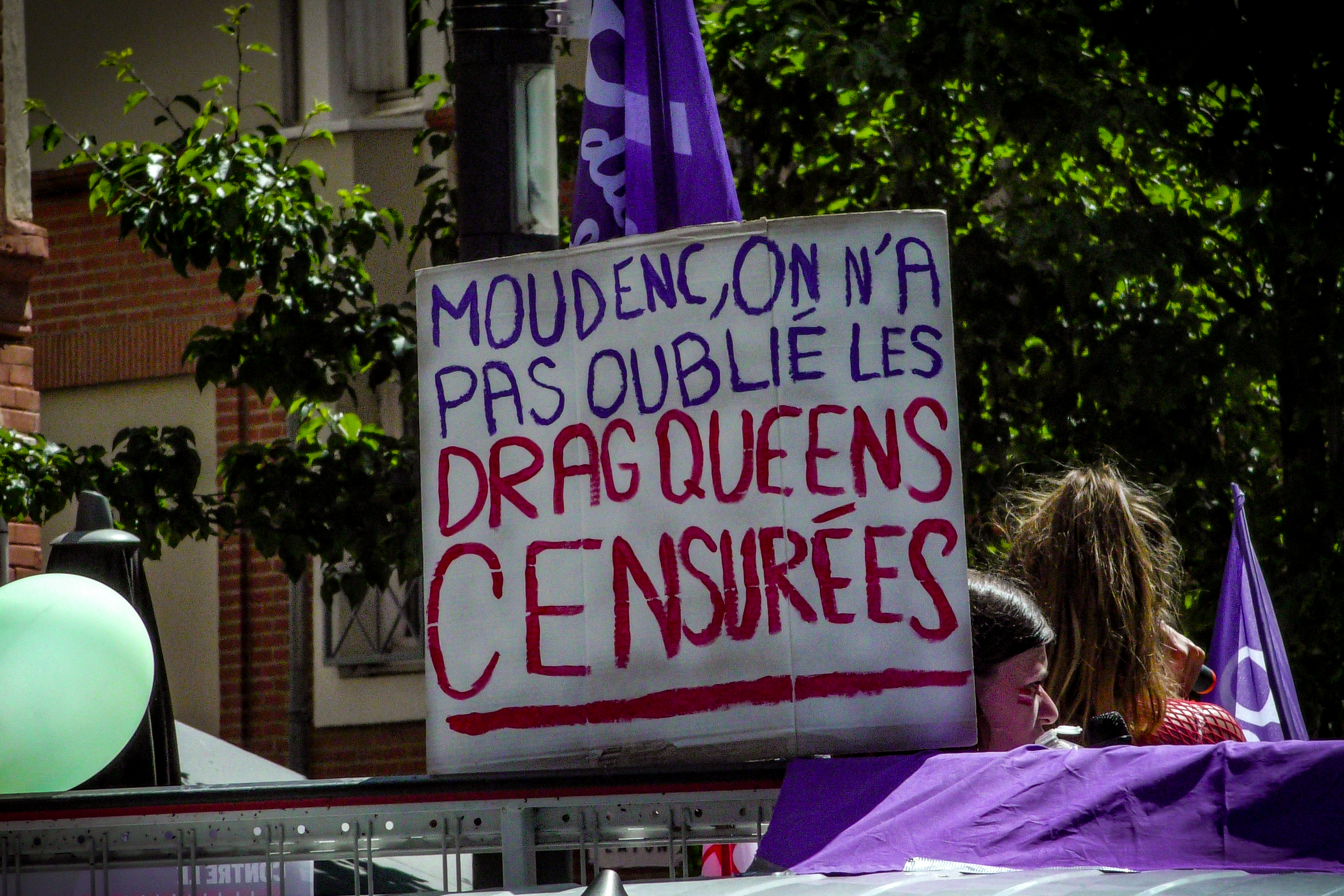
Sign from the Toulouse Pride march in June 2023: "Moudenc, we haven't forgotten the censored drag queens"

The growing visibility of drag does not prevent anti-drag protests, some of which become violent. Drag artists have reported being attacked in the street in Poitiers and Paris. The far right has organized campaigns against events in which drag queens read children's stories, leading the mayor of Toulouse, Jean-Luc Moudenc, to limit some such readings to people over the age of eighteen. Another drag reading in Montpellier was cancelled in 2024, and Enza Fragola, who performs drag readings, limits communication around her events to avoid controversy.

== Economic conditions ==
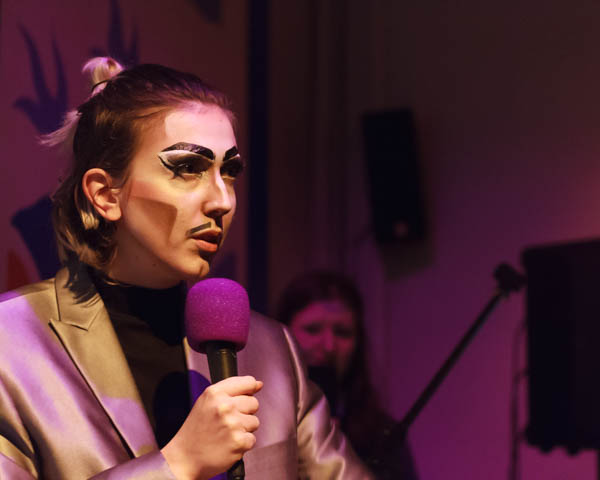
Drag king Koria$$ 2024 stand-up on sexist and sexual violence. The influence of RuPaul's Drag Race means that drag king practices such as stand-up and rap, which are excluded from the show, are rendered invisible compared to drag queens and lipsync.

The drag renaissance of the 2020s has a very DIY spirit, with little income for artists, who are often paid with free entry and drink tickets for the bar. In clubs, drag takes the form of go-go dancing and plays a role in the evening's entertainment; in bars, it plays a more central role as a vehicle for audience integration. Under these conditions, artist compensation comes from pay-what-you-want donations from the audience, which allows low-income queer people to attend drag shows but does not guarantee artists sufficient compensation for their expenses (makeup, wigs) or preparatory work. This model also involves undeclared work, and does not provide unemployment, retirement, mutual insurance, or health insurance benefits.

Increased visibility has been an economic mixed blessing for drag artists in France. On the one hand, artists are organizing to improve their working conditions and new opportunities are emerging, allowing artists to be paid in fees (rather than in kind) and therefore to obtain the status of intermittent performer under French labour law. On the other hand, the demand for greater quality and novelty makes drag more expensive, privileging artists with access to more capital excluding those who cannot afford to spend as much on their art. Artists are also no longer selected for the political beliefs they stand for, but rather for profitability and broad appeal.

Drag therefore remains precarious work in France: barely a handful of drag queens are able to make drag their main source of income, and the majority have to have a day job in addition to their art. Juggling a day job and drag performances is difficult for many, especially given the time required to do drag (travel, rehearsals, design of scenarios and creation of costumes) and the fear of being recognized as a drag queen by one's employer and then subjected to homophobia at work.

== Knowledge and archives ==
With this renaissance also came a focus on archiving and preserving the history of drag, in line with the broader project of creating an LGBTQI+ archives in Paris. This resulted in the creation of community websites documenting drag artists on the French scene, as well as a proliferation of research and other works published on the subject of drag.

== See also ==
- LGBTQ culture in France
  - LGBTQ culture in Paris
