= Drag Race France season 1 =

2022 season of Drag Race France

Drag Race France
- Season 1
- Promotional poster for season one
- Hosted by: Nicky Doll
- Judges: Nicky Doll; Daphné Bürki; Kiddy Smile
- No. of contestants: 10
- Winner: Paloma
- Runners-up: La Grande Dame; Soa de Muse
- Miss Congeniality: Elips
- No. of episodes: 8

Release
- Original network: France.tv Slash (France); WOW Presents Plus (International)
- Original release: 25 June – 11 August 2022

Season chronology
- Next → Season 2

The first season of Drag Race France premiered on June 25, 2022. The cast was announced on June 2, 2022. The winner of the first season of Drag Race France was Paloma, with La Grande Dame and Soa de Muse as runners-up.

Casting occurred in end 2021 with production starting in early 2022. On March 4, 2022, it was announced that the judges panel would include RuPaul's Drag Race season 12 contestant Nicky Doll, TV host and columnist Daphné Bürki and DJ and dancer Kiddy Smile.

The season consisted of eight one-hour episodes. The season was broadcast on the digital channel France.tv Slash every Thursday, but also aired on France 2 every Saturday night. It was available simultaneously on Crave in Canada, and on WOW Presents Plus internationally.

== Contestants ==
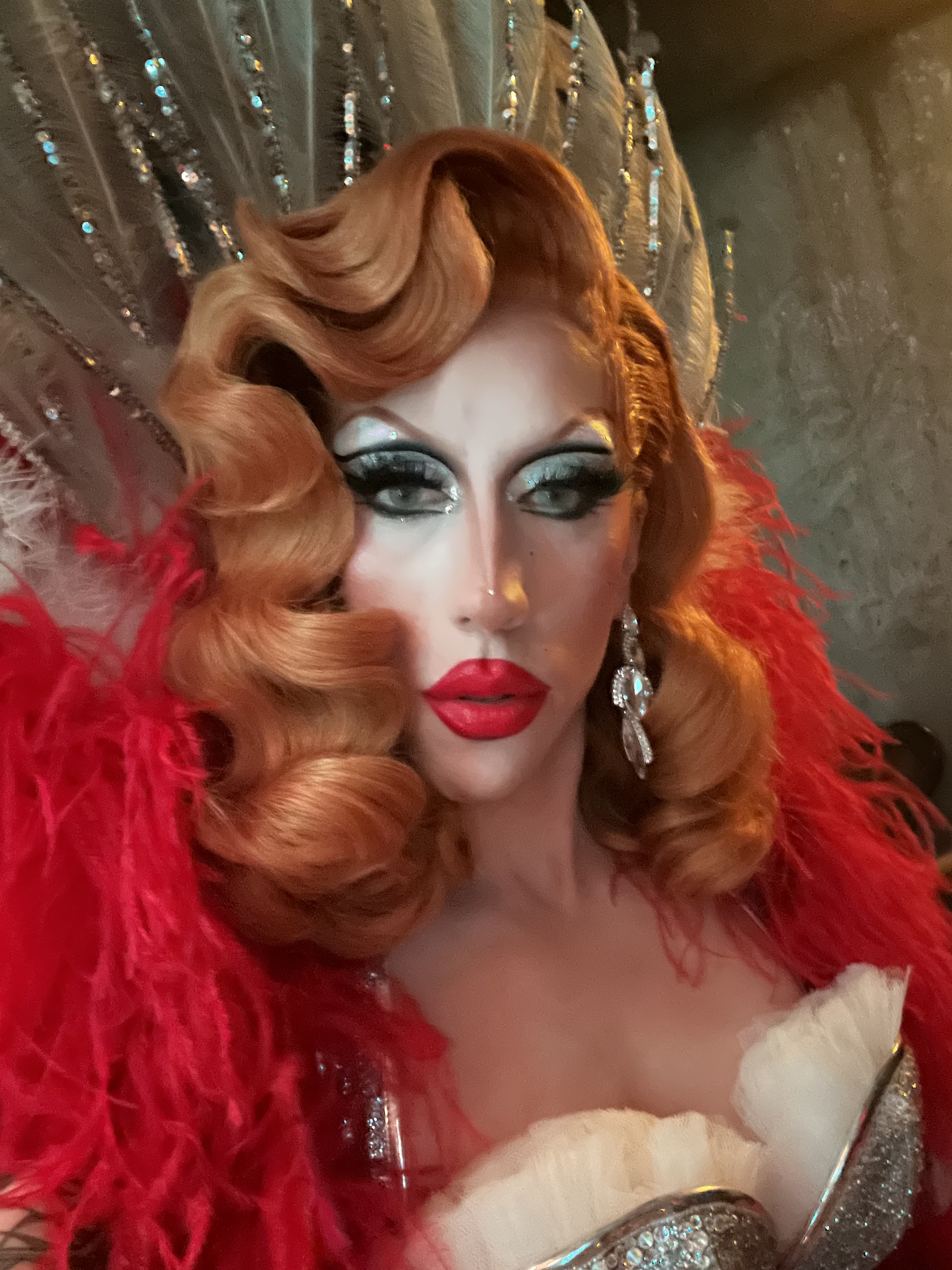
The winner, Paloma.

Ages, names, and cities stated are at time of filming.

Contestants of Drag Race France season 1 and their backgrounds
Contestant	Age	Hometown	Outcome
Paloma	30	Clermont-Ferrand, Auvergne-Rhône-Alpes	Winner
La Grande Dame	22	Nice, Provence-Alpes-Côte d'Azur	Runners-up
Soa de Muse	33	Saint-Denis, Île-de-France	Runners-up
Lolita Banana	36	Paris, Île-de-France	4th place
La Big Bertha	36	Paris, Île-de-France	5th place
Elips	25	Bordeaux, Nouvelle-Aquitaine	6th place (Note: Elips was voted Miss Congeniality by fellow contestants.)
Kam Hugh	22	Paris, Île-de-France	7th place
La Briochée	31	Palaiseau, Île-de-France	8th place
Lova Ladiva	32	Toulouse, Occitania	9th place
La Kahena	29	Paris, Île-de-France	10th place

== Contestant progress ==
Legend:

Paloma won Drag Race France season 1.
La Grande Dame and Soa de Muse were the runners-up.
Elips was voted Miss Congeniality (Miss C).
WIN indicates that the contestant won the challenge.
SAFE indicates that the contestant was declared safe by the judges.
STAY indicates that the contestant won a lip sync to advance to the finale.
BTM (Bottom) indicates that the contestant was up for elimination.
ELIM (Eliminated) indicates that the contestant was eliminated.
Guest indicates that the contestant returned as a guest.

Contestants progress with placements in each episode
Contestant	Episode							
Contestant	1	2	3	4	5	6	7	8
Paloma	SAFE	WIN	SAFE	SAFE	BTM	WIN	STAY	Winner
La Grande Dame	SAFE	SAFE	SAFE	WIN	SAFE	SAFE	STAY	Runner-up
Soa de Muse	WIN	BTM	BTM	SAFE	WIN	SAFE	STAY	Runner-up
Lolita Banana	SAFE	SAFE	SAFE	SAFE	SAFE	BTM	ELIM	Guest
La Big Bertha	SAFE	SAFE	SAFE	BTM	SAFE	ELIM		Guest
Elips	SAFE	SAFE	SAFE	SAFE	ELIM			Miss C
Kam Hugh	SAFE	SAFE	WIN	ELIM				Guest
La Briochée	SAFE	SAFE	ELIM					Guest
Lova Ladiva	BTM	ELIM						Guest
La Kahena	ELIM							Guest

== Lip syncs ==
Legend:

The contestant was eliminated after their first time in the bottom.
The contestant was eliminated after their second time in the bottom.
The contestant won the lip sync and advanced to the finale.
The contestant won the Lip Sync for the Crown and was declared the winner of the season.

Episode	Contestants			Song	Eliminated
1	La Kahena	vs.	Lova Ladiva	"Prière païenne" (Céline Dion)	La Kahena
2	Lova Ladiva	vs.	Soa de Muse	"Toutes les femmes de ta vie" (L5)	Lova Ladiva
3	La Briochée	vs.	Soa de Muse	"Pookie" (Aya Nakamura)	La Briochée
4	La Big Bertha	vs.	Kam Hugh	"DJ" (Note: In international broadcasts, licensing for this song was denied and a generic instrumental track was played to accompany the lip sync.) (Diam's)	Kam Hugh
5	Elips	vs.	Paloma	"Libertine" (Mylène Farmer)	Elips
6	La Big Bertha	vs.	Lolita Banana	"Corps" (Yseult)	La Big Bertha
Episode	Contestants			Song	Winner
7	Lolita Banana	vs.	Soa de Muse	"Dieu m'a donné la foi" (Ophélie Winter)	Soa de Muse
7	La Grande Dame	vs.	Paloma	"Le Banana Split" (Lio)	Paloma
7	Contestants			Song	Eliminated
7	La Grande Dame	vs.	Lolita Banana	"La grenade" (Clara Luciani)	Lolita Banana
Episode	Final contestants			Song	Winner
8	La Grande Dame vs. Paloma vs. Soa de Muse			"Mourir sur scène" (Dalida)	Paloma

== Guest judges ==
Listed in chronological order:

- Jean Paul Gaultier, fashion designer
- Iris Mittenaere, Miss France 2016 and Miss Universe 2016
- Marianne James, singer, actress and TV host
- Chantal Thomass, fashion designer
- Véronique Philipponnat, journalist and Elle's managing editor
- Bilal Hassani, singer-songwriter and Eurovision 2019 French representative
- Shy'm, singer
- Yanis Marshall, dancer and choreographer
- Alexandre Mattiussi, fashion designer
- Yseult, singer-songwriter and model
- Raya Martigny, model
- Loïc Prigent, fashion journalist and documentary filmmaker
- Olivier Rousteing, fashion designer and creative director of Balmain
- Nicolas Huchard, choreographer

=== Special guests ===
Guests who appeared in episodes, but did not judge on the main stage.

Episode 1

- Jean Ranobrac, photographer

Episode 2

- Chico, drag king
- Jésus La Vidange, drag king
- Juda La Vidange, drag king

Episode 4

- Bérengère Krief, actress and comedian

Episode 5

- Anthonin Fabre, YouTuber
- Mark Weld, singer-songwriter and comedian
- Thoj, musician

== Episodes ==
No. overall	No. in season	Title	Original release date
1	1	"Bonjour, Bonjour, Bonjour!"	25 June 2022
Ten queens enter the workroom. For the first mini-challenge, the queens do a cabaret photoshoot. Lolita Banana wins the mini-challenge. For the main challenge, the queens perform a talent show in front of the judges.: Elips - Lip-sync performance; Kam Hugh - Live singing; La Big Bertha - Burlesque; La Briochée - Live singing; La Grande Dame - Lip-sync performance/Saxophone; La Kahena - Comedy performance; Lolita Banana - Lip-sync performance; Lova Ladiva - Stand-up; Paloma - Stand-up; Soa de Muse - Live singing; On the runway, category is Liberté, égalité, Jean-Paul Gaultier (Liberty, Equality, Jean-Paul Gaultier). Elips, La Big Bertha and Soa de Muse receive positive critiques, with Soa de Muse winning the challenge. Kam Hugh, La Kahena and Lova Ladiva receive negative critiques, with Kam Hugh being safe. La Kahena and Lova Ladiva lip-sync to "Prière païenne" by Céline Dion. Lova Ladiva wins the lip-sync and La Kahena is the first queen to sashay away.: Guest Judges: Iris Mittenaere and Jean-Paul Gaultier; Mini-Challenge: Cabaret photoshoot; Mini-Challenge Winner: Lolita Banana; Main Challenge: Perform a talent show in front of the judges; Runway Theme: Liberté, égalité, Jean-Paul Gaultier (Liberty, Equality, Jean-Paul Gaultier); Challenge Winner: Soa de Muse; Challenge Prize: A weekend in London; Bottom Two: La Kahena and Lova Ladiva; Lip-Sync Song: "Prière païenne" by Céline Dion; Eliminated: La Kahena; Farewell Message: "Bisous❤️ on s'appelle on se fait une raclette ! Bertha + Soa❤️ it's yours." ("Kisses❤️ we'll call each other and let's make a raclette ! Bertha + Soa❤️ it's yours.")
2	2	"Queen Pour Cent"	30 June 2022
For this week's mini-challenge, the queens get into twenty minute rock 'n' roll quick drag and front a band of drag kings. La Grande Dame wins the mini-challenge. For the main challenge, the queens act in Dix Pour Cent parody "Queen Pour Cent".: Elips plays Marcelle; Kam Hugh plays Isabelle Adjani; La Big Bertha plays Miranda; La Grande Dame plays Mona; La Briochée plays Marion Cotillard and Edith Piaf; Lolita Banana plays Yolanda; Lova Ladiva plays Kimberley; Paloma plays Viviane; Soa de Muse plays Anita; On the runway, category is Dites-le avec des fleurs (Say It With Flowers). La Grande Dame, Lolita Banana and Paloma receive positive critiques, with Paloma winning the challenge. La Big Bertha, Lova Ladiva and Soa de Muse receive negative critiques, with La Big Bertha being safe. Lova Ladiva and Soa de Muse lip-sync to "Toutes les femmes de ta vie" by L5. Soa de Muse wins the lip-sync and Lova Ladiva sashays away.: Guest Judge: Marianne James; Mini-Challenge: Rock 'n' roll show quick-drag; Mini-Challenge Guests: Jesus La Vidange, Juda La Vidange, Chico; Mini-Challenge Winner: La Grande Dame; Main Challenge: Act in the Dix Pour Cent parody "Queen Pour Cent"; Runway Theme: Dites-le avec des fleurs (Say It With Flowers); Challenge Winner: Paloma; Challenge Prize: A weekend getaway and thalassotherapy treatment in Cabourg; Bottom Two: Lova Ladiva and Soa da Muse; Lip-Sync Song: "Toutes les femmes de ta vie" by L5; Eliminated: Lova Ladiva; Farewell Message: "I love you déchirer toutes. A très vite, Lova Ladiva ho thank you ❤️Lova!!!" ("I love you tear it all up. See you soon, Lova Ladiva oh thank you ❤️Lova!!!")
3	3	"The French Ball"	7 July 2022
For this week's mini-challenge, the queens pair up and film a baguette baking tutorial. La Briochée and Elips win the mini-challenge. For the main challenge, the queens create three looks for The French Ball: Ma France à moi (My Own France), French Clichés, and Festival de Cannes. On the runway, Kam Hugh, La Grande Dame and Paloma receive positive critiques, with Kam Hugh winning the challenge. Elips, La Big Bertha, La Briochée and Soa de Muse receive negative critiques, with Elips and La Big Bertha being safe. La Briochée and Soa de Muse lip-sync to "Pookie" by Aya Nakamura. Soa de Muse wins the lip-sync and La Briochée sashays away.: Guest Judges: Chantal Thomass and Véronique Philipponnat; Mini-Challenge: Film a baguette baking tutorial; Mini-Challenge Winners: La Briochée and Elips; Main Challenge: The French Ball; Runway Themes: Ma France à moi (My own France), French Clichés, and Festival de Cannes; Challenge Winner: Kam Hugh; Challenge Prize: A €2,000 shopping spree; Bottom Two: La Briochée and Soa de Muse; Lip-Sync Song: "Pookie" by Aya Nakamura; Eliminated: La Briochée; Farewell Message: "Merci infiniment de m'avoir accueillie avec tant d'amour. Soyez généreuses, fabuleuses et moelleuses, comme moi. Love, La Briochée." ("Thank you so much for welcoming me with so much love. Be generous, fabulous, and fluffy, like me. Love, La Briochée")
4	4	"Snatch Game"	14 July 2022
For this week's mini-challenge, the queens read each other to filth. La Big Bertha wins the mini-challenge. For the main challenge, the queens play the Snatch Game. Bilal Hassani and Bérengère Krief star as the celebrity contestants. The cast consisted of: Elips as Chantal Ladesou; Kam Hugh as Mireille Mathieu; La Big Bertha as Jean-Pierre Coffe; La Grande Dame as Alexandra Rosenfeld; Lolita Banana as Rossy de Palma; Paloma as Fanny Ardant; Soa de Muse as Félindra; On the runway, category is Lendemain de soirée (The Morning After A Night Out). La Grande Dame, Paloma and Soa de Muse receive positive critiques, with La Grande Dame winning the challenge. Kam Hugh, La Big Bertha and Lolita Banana receive negative critiques, with Lolita Banana being safe. Kam Hugh and La Big Bertha lip-sync to "DJ" by Diam's. La Big Bertha wins the lip-sync and Kam Hugh sashays away.: Guest Judge: Bilal Hassani; Mini-Challenge: Reading is Fundamental; Mini-Challenge Winner: La Big Bertha; Main Challenge: Snatch Game; Runway Theme: Lendemain de soirée (The Morning After A Night Out); Challenge Winner: La Grande Dame; Challenge Prize: A gift valued at €2,000 courtesy of La Maison Patou; Bottom Two: Kam Hugh and La Big Bertha; Lip-Sync Song: "DJ" by Diam's (not played in international broadcast due to copyright issues); Eliminated: Kam Hugh; Farewell Message: "1 2 3 Kam! Vous êtes toutes extra, hâte de vous apprendre à poser !!! Love you pour toujours" ("1 2 3 Kam! You're all so great, can't wait to teach you all how to pose !!! Love you always")
5	5	"Popstars"	21 July 2022
For this week's mini-challenge, the queens pair up and paint each others faces while blindfolded. La Grande Dame and Soa de Muse win the mini-challenge. For the main challenge, the queens write, record, and perform verses to "Boom Boom".: Team Les sœurs Jacquettes (The Jacquette Sisters): La Big Bertha, La Grande Dame and Paloma; Team The Nails: Elips, Lolita Banana and Soa de Muse; On the runway, category is La nuit des 1000 Mylène (The Night of 1000 Mylènes). La Big Bertha, Lolita Banana and Soa de Muse receive positive critiques, with Soa de Muse winning the challenge. Elips, La Grande Dame and Paloma receive negative critiques, with La Grande Dame being safe. Elips and Paloma lip-sync to "Libertine" by Mylène Farmer. Paloma wins the lip-sync and Elips sashays away.: Guest Judges: Shy'm and Yanis Marshall; Mini-Challenge: In pairs, paint each others faces while blindfolded; Mini-Challenge Winners: La Grande Dame and Soa de Muse; Main Challenge: Write, record, and perform verses to "Boom Boom"; Runway Theme: La nuit des 1000 Mylène (The Night of 1000 Mylènes); Challenge Winner: Soa de Muse; Challenge Prize: A trip to Berlin; Bottom Two: Elips and Paloma; Lip-Sync Song: "Libertine" by Mylène Farmer (not played in international broadcast due to copyright issues); Eliminated: Elips; Farewell Message: "*🗼Paris Merci mes amours pour cette sublime aventure.❤️ Hâte de vous retrouver à Bordeaux, en France et dans le monde entier❤️ Elips💋" ("🗼 Paris thank you for this sublime adventure, my loves. ❤️ Can't wait to see you all in Bordeaux, in France and around the world ❤️ Elips💋")
6	6	"Un Parfum de Drag"	28 July 2022
For this week's mini-challenge, the queens have a bitchfest with puppets. Paloma wins the mini-challenge. For the main challenge, the queens write and produce perfume advertisements.: La Big Bertha - Cliché by Marais; La Grande Dame - Pschitt Pschitt; Lolita Banana - Lolita Coquine; Paloma - Arnaque; Soa de Muse - Counia; On the runway, category is Haute Couture. Paloma and Soa de Muse receive positive critiques, with Paloma winning the challenge. La Big Bertha and Lolita Banana receive negative critiques, and are announced as the bottom two. They lip-sync to "Corps" by Yseult. Lolita Banana wins the lip-sync and La Big Bertha sashays away.: Guest Judges: Alexandre Mattiussi and Yseult; Mini-Challenge: Everybody Loves Puppets; Mini-Challenge Winner: Paloma; Main Challenge: Write and produce perfume advertisements; Runway Theme: Haute Couture; Challenge Winner: Paloma; Challenge Prize: A year's supply of Jean-Paul Gaultier perfume and the opportunity to appear in the upcoming Gaultier Pride digital campaign; Bottom Two: La Big Bertha and Lolita Banana; Lip-Sync Song: "Corps" by Yseult; Eliminated: La Big Bertha; Farewell Message: "Mes poupoules... Je suis fière d'avoir de nouvelles sœurs comme vous. Déchirez tout, amour et cornichons❤️ "Soa kouroukou si tu ne gagnes pas" 4EVER Big❤️" ("My chicks... I'm proud to have new sisters like you. Tear it up, love and pickles ❤️ "Soa kouroukou if you don't win" 4EVER Big❤️")
7	7	"Sororité"	4 August 2022
For the final challenge of the season, the queens makeover their best friends. On the runway, category is Un air de famille (A Family Resemblance). Each queen is given positive feedback. Unable to pick a winner this week, and to decide two bottom queens, Nicky Doll reveals that all four queens must compete in a lip-sync smackdown for a spot in the finale. Lolita Banana and Soa de Muse lip-sync to "Dieu m'a donné la foi" by Ophélie Winter. Soa de Muse wins the lip-sync and is the first queen to advance to the top three. La Grande Dame and Paloma lip-sync to "Le Banana Split by Lio. Paloma wins the lip-sync and is the second queen to advance to the top three. La Grande Dame and Lolita Banana, as the losers of the previous lip syncs, lip sync in the final round to "La grenade" by Clara Luciani. La Grande Dame wins the lip-sync and is the final queen to advance to the top three and Lolita Banana sashays away.: Guest Judges: Loïc Prigent and Raya Martigny; Main Challenge: Makeover your best friend; Runway Theme: Un air de famille (A Family Resemblance); Lip-Sync Smackdown #1: Lolita Banana vs. Soa de Muse; Lip-Sync Song: "Dieu m'a donné la foi" by Ophélie Winter; Winner: Soa de Muse; Lip-Sync Smackdown #2: La Grande Dame vs. Paloma; Lip-Sync Song: "Le Banana Split by Lio; Winner: Paloma; Lip-Sync Smackdown #3: La Grande Dame vs. Lolita Banana; Lip-Sync Song: "La grenade" by Clara Luciani; Winner: La Grande Dame; Top Three: La Grande Dame, Paloma and Soa de Muse; Eliminated: Lolita Banana; Farewell Message: "Paloma: Tes une diva incroyable. Soa: Tes une star, une bombe. La Grande Dame: Je suis ton fan no. 1. Las amo!! ❤️Holi! ("Paloma: you are an incredible diva. Soa: you are a star, a bombshell. La Grande Dame: I am your #1 fan. I love you [girls]! ❤️Hi!")
8	8	"Grande Finale"	11 August 2022
For the final challenge of the season, the queens perform a lip-syncing dance number to RuPaul's song "Catwalk". On the runway, category is Dragnifique (Dragnificent). The eliminated queens all return to the runway, where it is announced that Elips is this season's Miss Congeniality. The three finalists are told that they will be lip-syncing to "Mourir sur scène" by Dalida. It is announced that Paloma is the winner, leaving La Grande Dame and Soa de Muse as the runners-up.: Guest Judges: Olivier Rousteing and Nicolas Huchard; Main Challenge: Perform a lip-syncing dance number to RuPaul's song "Catwalk"; Runway Theme: Dragnifique (Dragnificent); Miss Congeniality: Elips; Lip-Sync Song: "Mourir sur scène" by Dalida; Runners-up: La Grande Dame and Soa de Muse; Winner of Drag Race France Season 1: Paloma
