= Maya the Drag Queen =

Performer, singer, activist and drag queen

Maya
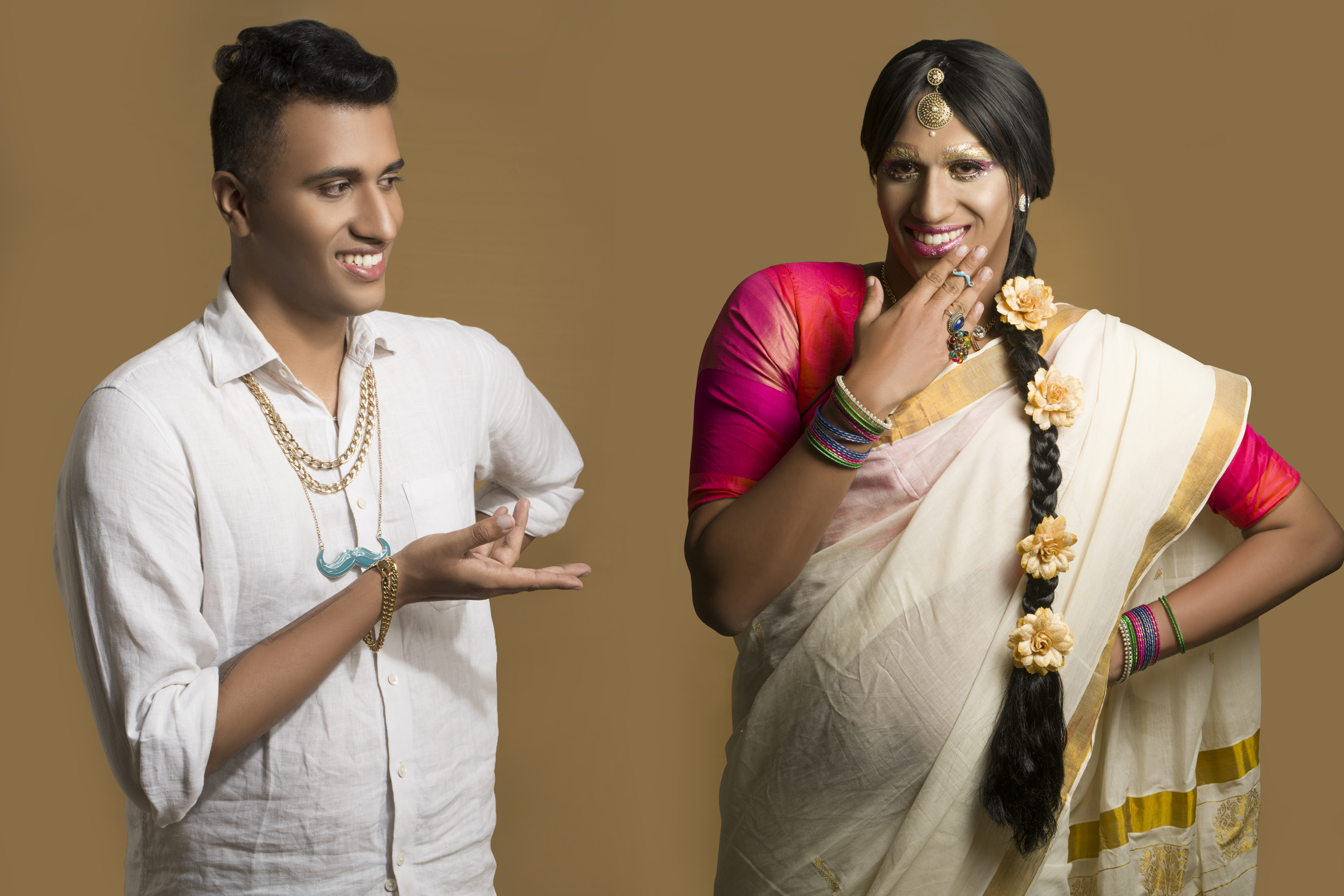
- Born: Alex Mathew; Kerala, India

Alex Mathew, popularly known as Maya the Drag Queen or Mayamma, is a drag queen from India. Mathew started performing drag in 2014 at Jagriti, The Humming Tree, and gave many performances at Rangashankara, Opus, and Alliance Franciase, among others. Mathew is also an actor, singer, motivational speaker and a corporate employee.

== Early life ==
Alex Mathew was born in the southern Indian state of Kerala and was raised in its capital, Thiruvananthapuram. From an early age, he was aware of his femininity. One of his earliest public performances was in childhood at a school fancy dress competition, in which he dressed as Nagavalli, a character from the Malayalam film Manichitrathazhu. Mathew later recalled that he did not expect to win, but simply wanted an opportunity to express his femininity.

During his youth, Mathew said he experienced bullying because of his Malayali accent but eventually came to embrace it as part of his identity. He was inspired by the films Mrs. Doubtfire and Chachi 420, whose male protagonists adopt female personas. He later said these performances helped him imagine drag as a form of self-expression.

== Personal life ==
Mathew came out to his family a couple of months after his first performance. Speaking about his experience, Mathew said, "That day, my mother gave away the sari reluctantly because she couldn't approve of my drag identity...Now she packs my suitcase whenever I step out of the city for performance. It took her three years to accept my drag identity and understand that I perform in a sari to break the gender stereotypes of this patriarchal world."

== Career ==
Mathew was one of the first drag artists to perform regularly in Bengaluru when he began in September 2014. After his first performance, he came out as a queer man and adopted the stage persona "Maya," also known as "Mayamma."

Although he initially saw drag as a form of entertainment, Mathew has said that Maya evolved into a vehicle for social commentary. He created the character in response to growing concerns about gender-based violence in India. The 2012 Delhi gang rape and the rape of a four-year-old girl in Bengaluru in 2014 prompted nationwide protests and renewed public debate about women's safety. Through Maya, Mathew began incorporating messages about gender equality, feminism and individual freedom into his performances.

Mathew performed at venues including Jagriti, The Humming Tree, Rangashankara, Opus and Alliance Française before expanding elsewhere in India. He has cited RuPaul and Bianca Del Rio among his artistic influences.

By 2017, Mathew had expanded his work beyond live performance. Fashion choreographer Prasad Bidapa featured him in a photoshoot, and Mathew began delivering TEDx talks, conducting workshops, and speaking publicly about gender equality, feminism and LGBTQ rights. He also hosted the talk show Chaaya with Maya.

Following the 2018 decision of the Supreme Court of India to strike down the portion of Section 377 of the Indian Penal Code criminalizing consensual same-sex relationships, Mathew said public awareness of drag increased, leading to larger audiences for performances. Mathew appeared as Maya in the French documentary The Queer Explorer, hosted by Nicky Doll. In January 2023, he inaugurated a Pride Café in Bengaluru.

== Music ==
- Proud Maya
- Drag Queens
