= The Queer Explorer =

French travel documentary television series

- French: Les voyages de Nicky
- Genre: Documentary
- Created by: Nicky Doll and Maxime Donzel
- Written by: Maxime Donzel and Nicky Doll
- Directed by: Maxime Donzel
- Presented by: Nicky Doll
- Theme music composer: Josselin Bordat
- Country of origin: France
- Original language: French
- No. of seasons: 1
- No. of episodes: 4

Production
- Running time: 51-52 minutes
- Production companies: Effervescence Doc; France Télévisions

Original release
- Network: France 5
- Release: 29 August 2023 – present

The Queer Explorer (French: Les voyages de Nicky) is a French documentary television show on France 5 that debuted on August 29, 2023. The series follows Nicky Doll as she explores queer communities and gender expression around the world. The first season consists of four episodes that showcase queer culture, LGBT rights and activism, and the art of drag in India, Greece, Mexico, and Japan. On August 30, 2023, CAN'T STOP media announced that they have acquired the global distribution rights to the series. The documentary premiered internationally at the Chelsea Film Festival in New York City on October 20, 2024.

== Production ==
In an interview with Elle, Nicky Doll credited Anthony Bourdain and her own exposure to different cultures while living in France, Saint Martin, and Morocco as the inspiration for the show. The series was one of two documentaries selected for France 5's 2023 summer programming out of 232 candidates.

== Episodes ==
=== Season 1 (2023) ===
No. overall	No. in season	Title	Original release date
1	1	"En Inde"	August 29, 2023
Nicky travels to India, where she goes sari shopping and navigates the backwaters of Kerala with Maya the Drag Queen. Nicky then visits a Hijra village founded by Grace Banu, a transgender activist. She then attends the Navratri festival in Tiruchendur, Tamil Nadu, where men crossdress to pay respects to the goddess Kali. Nicky ends her trip with a Bollywood-style performance in Mumbai.
2	2	"En Grèce"	August 29, 2023
Nicky meets the drag queen Kangela and watches her perform at the first and only queer comedy club in Athens. Nicky then sets sail for Sifnos, where she has a photoshoot with fashion photographer René Habermacher and meets a local sculptor. She then travels to Lesbos to meet one of the pioneers of the local lesbian community and discover Sappho's lasting imprint on the island.
3	3	"Au Mexique"	September 4, 2023
Nicky travels to Juchitán, Oaxaca to learn about the Muxe community. She then makes her way to the city of Izamal to understand the ties between Mayan culture and today's LGBQT communities, followed by a performance with a local drag queen in a cenote. She then reunites with Lolita Banana in Mexico City for an initiation to lucha libre by Chik Tormenta, a conversation with Lolita's father, and a joint performance. While in Mexico City, Nicky discusses progress in transgender rights with Salma Luévano.
4	4	"Au Japon"	September 4, 2023
Nicky explores the influence of geishas on drag queens in Osaka and the fluidity of gender roles in a Taishū engeki performance in Kyoto. She spends several days with Kodo Nishimura, a Buddhist monk and LGBQT activist, in Oshino. They discuss Kodo's path to becoming a monk, take a kimono class, and participate in a tea ceremony. Finally, Nicky attends Tokyo Rainbow Pride and talks to activists fighting for the legalization of gay marriage.
