= Kodo Nishimura =

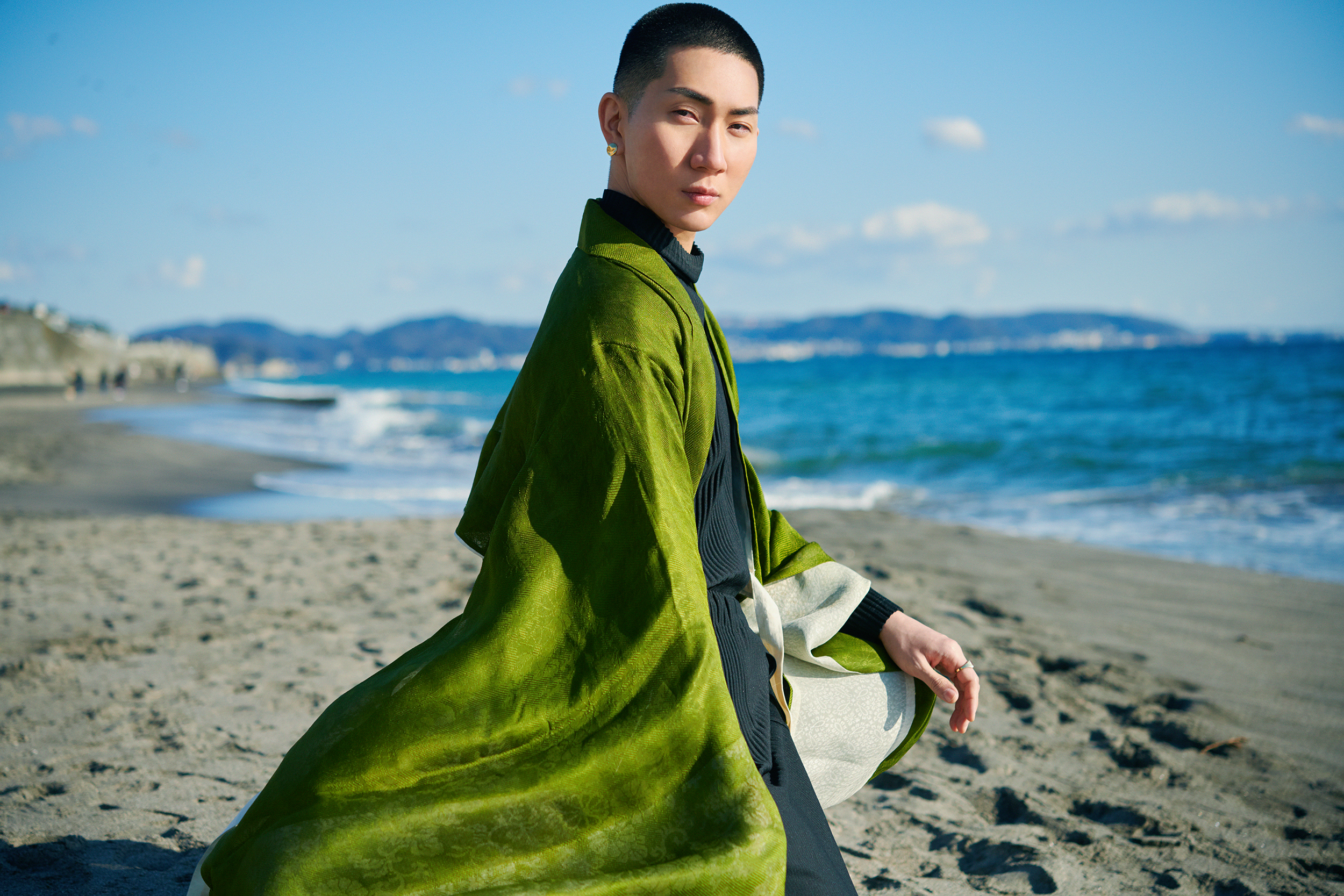
Kodo Nishimura

Kodo Nishimura (西村 宏堂, Nishimura Kōdō; born February 13, 1989 in Tokyo) is a Japanese Buddhist monk, artist, and author. He is an advocate for LGBTQ rights.

== Early life and education ==
Nishimura was born in 1989 and grew up in Tokyo. His father was a Jōdo-shū Buddhist priest, and Nishimura was raised in his temple. He studied ikebana for eight years.

After watching The Princess Diaries in junior high school, Nishimura became interested in visiting the United States.

Nishimura briefly struggled with his perception of his own beauty as an Asian man before discovering makeup, which he did not use in Japan because of social stigmas. After graduating from high school, Nishimura moved to the United States and studied at Dean College, where he asked drag queens working at makeup stores questions about what to buy. He then purchased makeup and learned how to use it. He graduated from the Parsons School of Design majoring in Fine Arts.

== Career ==
Nishimura began working as a makeup artist when he was 22. He got an internship with a makeup artist that later led to a job. His work was featured in Nylon and Life & Style. He also does makeup for beauty queens in Miss Universe and Miss USA contests. In addition, Nishimura spends time teaching LGBTQ+ community how to apply makeup.

Nishimura came out as gay when he participated in a photo shoot for Out in Japan. He describes himself as "gender gifted", a term he uses to release himself from the box of man or woman. He doesn't view his gender as male or female, only his body as male.

When he returned to Japan, Nishimura began to train as a Buddhist monk in the Jōdo-shū sect. At first, he was hesitant to do so, but after consulting with a master, he realized that he could be both a Buddhist priest wearing makeup and heels as long as his goal was to spread Buddhist beliefs about living in happiness and harmony with others. He was fully ordained in 2015 and started to talk about Buddhism and sexuality at places such as United Nations Population Fund, Yale University and Stanford University.

He made an appearance on an episode of Queer Eye in its Queer Eye: We’re in Japan! season.

In 2020, Nishimura wrote the book, "This Monk Wears Heels: Be Who You Are," an autobiography about Nishimura's struggles growing up as gay in Japan and the difficult transition of being a foreigner in the United States. The book is self-help oriented, with the intent to inspire readers to find comfort and confidence in living as their authentic selves.

In March 2022, Nishimura was the subject of an NHK World-Japan documentary, "A Monk Who Wears Heels".

== Media appearances ==
Television

- "Queer Eye" We’re In Japan! Crazy in Love (2019) Netflix
- "Weltbilder" Japan: Homosexueller Mönch und Make-Up-Artist (2020) Germany / ARD
- "ABC News" Meet Kodo - the Japanese Buddhist monk bucking tradition (2021) Australia / ABC
- "Direct Talk" (2021) Japan / NHK WORLD
- "Dohiru" (2021) Thai / PBS
- "A Monk Who Wear Heels" (2022) Japan / NHK WORLD
- "Planet Sex with Cara Delevingne" (2022) BBC/ Hulu
- "Les Voyages de Nicky" (2022) France / France 5

Magazine

- "Accent Magazine" Kodo: Cover girl (2018) U.K.
- "VOGUE Italia" (2019) Italy
- "1883 Magazine Rebel Issue" (2020)
- "Peacock magazine" Kodo Nishimura is a global makeup artist and a certificated Buddhist monk（2021) India
- "TIME" Next Generation Leaders (2021)

Web

- "BuzzFeed USA" This Buddhist Monk Is A Celebrity Makeup Artist And His Instagram Is Fierce As Hell (2017) U.S.
- "New Now Next" This Buddhist Monk Moonlights As A Drag Queen And Celebrity Makeup Artist (2017)
- "The Times" Heard the one about Miss Universe and the Buddhist monk? (2017) U.K
- "BBC World" The Japanese monk moonlighting as a makeup artist (2017) U.K.
- "The New York Times Style Magazine: Singapore" Buddhist Monk By Day, Makeup Artist By Night (2017) Singapore
- "VOGUE Korea" Male Make Up Artists (2017) Korea
- "Accent Magazine" Kodo: Cover girl (2018) U.K.
- "Yahoo! News" Buddha and bronzer: The Japanese monk who loves cosmetics（2018) U.S.
- "BBC News" The man who finds Buddhism in mascara (2019) U.K.
- "Yale University, Yale MACMILLAN CENTER" The Buddhist makeup artist: A personal story about sexuality and transformation（2019) U.S.
- "Pink News" Meet the Buddhist monk leading a double life as a makeup artist (2019) U.K.
- "Hive Life" Kodo Nishimura: The Monk in Mascara (2019) Hong Kong
- "60 Second Docs" Makeup Classes By A Japanese Buddhist Monk (2019) U.S.
- "COSME HUNT" Interview with a Japanese Makeup Artist: Kodo Nishimura (2019) U.S.
- "Great Big Story" This Buddhist Monk Doubles as a Celebrity Makeup Artist (2020) U.S.
- "Time Out Tokyo" Kodo Nishimura: Buddhist monk, Makeup artist, LGBTQ + advocate (2020)
- "UNILAD" This Buddhist Monk Is A Make Up Artist To The Stars (2020) U.K.
- "El nuevo dia"Kodo Nishimura: el monje budista que se expresa a través del maquillaje（2020) Puerto Rico
- "El PAIS" El monje gay que maquilla a las misses (2020) Spain
- "NHK WORLD JAPAN" Makeup artist monk teaches tolerance of sexual diversity (2020) Japan
- "Thomson Reuters Foundation News" The Buddhist monk and make-up artist seeking LGBT+ equality in Japan (2020) U.K.
- "Japan Times" Buddhist monk and makeup artist seeks LGBTQ equality in Japan (2020) Japan
- "Have a Blessed Gay" Buddhist Monk and Global Makeup Artist: Kodo Nishimura（2020) U.S.
- 『ABC News』Kodo's a make-up artist and a Buddhist monk speaking up for LGBTQ rights and defying stereotypes in conservative Japan (2021) Australia
- "Japan Times Alpha" Makeup artist monk finds identity and faith in US (2021) Japan
- "TIME" NEXT GENERATION LEADERS ‘I Am Both Ancient and Trendy.’ He’s a Buddhist Monk, a Makeup Artist and an LGBTQ Activist (2021) U.S.
- "LION’S ROAR" (2022) U.S.
- "VOGUE.com" Dublet FALL 2022 MENSWEAR (2022)
- "Watkins Mind Body Spirit" 100 Most Spiritually Influential Living People in the World (2022) U.K.
- "METROPOLIS" This Monk Wears Heels / Kodo Nishimura shares his fairy godmother spirit in new book (2022) Japan
- "TRICYCLE" ‘This Monk Wears Heels’: An Interview with Kodo Nishimura (2022) U.S
- "attitude" 'THIS MONK WEARS HEELS' AUTHOR KODO NISHIMURA WANTS TO 'GIVE PERSPECTIVES FROM ANOTHER PART OF THE WORLD' (2022) U.K.
- "RED SHOE MOVEMENT" Hall of Fame 2022 Honorees (2022）
- "Luxury London" Kodo Nishimura: In conversation with the monk in makeup (2022) U.K.
- The Asahi Shimbun Asia & Japan Watch』Monk’s book supports LGBT people through a Buddhist’s eyes (2022) Japan
