= Katia Tchenko =

French actress

- Born: 8 May 1947 (age 79); Versailles, France
- Occupation: Actress
- Years active: 1967-present

Katia Tchenko (born 8 May 1947) is a French actress of Russian descent. She has appeared in more than 100 films and television shows since 1967. In 1999 she was a member of the jury at the 21st Moscow International Film Festival.

== Filmography ==
Year	Title	Role	Director	Notes
1967	I Killed Rasputin	A follower of Rasputin	Robert Hossein	
1968	L'étrangère	A secretary	Sergio Gobbi	
1968	Le bal des voyous	Ginette	Jean-Claude Dague & Louis Soulanes	
1970	Promise at Dawn	The actress	Jules Dassin	
1970	Dossier prostitution	Monique	Jean-Claude Roy	
1970	Les cousines	Dolly	Louis Soulanes (2)	
1970	Les enquêtes du commissaire Maigret	Aline	Claude Barma	TV Series (1 Episode)
1971	Law Breakers	Graziani's assistant	Marcel Carné	
1971	Perverse et docile	Hina	Jean-Louis van Belle	
1971	Le voyageur des siècles	The shepherdess	Jean Dréville	TV Mini-Series
1972	Les Charlots font l'Espagne	Colette Leplat	Jean Girault	
1972	Pas folle la guêpe		Jean Delannoy	
1972	L'odeur des fauves	The star	Richard Balducci	
1972	Schulmeister, espion de l'empereur	Berguitte	Jean-Pierre Decourt	TV Series (1 Episode)
1973	Le concierge	Jocelyne	Jean Girault (2)	
1973	Les tentations de Marianne	Myriam	Francis Leroi	
1973	L'insolent	Milan's friend	Jean-Claude Roy (2)	
1973	L'alphomega		Lazare Iglesis	TV Mini-Series
1974	Serre-moi contre toi, j'ai besoin de caresses	Olga Berenson	Raoul André	
1974	Les charnelles	The raped girl	Claude Mulot	
1974	Deux grandes filles dans un pyjama	The representative	Jean Giraulty (3)	
1974	La mouche bleue	Josie Simons	Jean-Paul Sassy	TV Movie
1974	Le vagabond		Claude-Jean Bonnardot	TV Series (1 Episode)
1974	Chéri-Bibi		Jean Pignol	TV Series (1 Episode)
1975	That Most Important Thing: Love	Myriam	Andrzej Żuławski	
1975	La messe dorée	Katia	Beni Montresor	
1975	Le pied !	The garter belts's buyer	Pierre Unia	
1975	La chasse aux hommes	Nancy	Lazare Iglesis (2)	TV Series (1 Episode)
1976	L'éducation amoureuse de Valentin	Odile	Jean L'Hôte	
1976	Cours après moi ... que je t'attrape	Grandpré's friend	Robert Pouret	
1976	L'inspecteur mène l'enquête		Marc Pavaux & Armand Ridel	TV Series (1 Episode)
1977	The Bishop's Bedroom	Charlotte	Dino Risi	
1977	Drôles de zèbres	The nymphomaniac	Guy Lux	
1977	Le mille-pattes fait des claquettes	Trudy	Jean Girault (4)	
1977	L'ombre et la nuit	The nurse	Jean-Louis Leconte	
1977	Blue jeans	The prostitute	Hugues Burin des Roziers	
1978	La Carapate	The prostitute	Gérard Oury	
1978	L'horoscope	Ginette Marchand	Jean Girault (5)	
1978	Général... nous voilà !	Mireille	Jacques Besnard	
1978	Les bidasses au pensionnat	A girl	Michel Vocoret	
1978	Les ringards		Robert Pouret (2)	
1978	Quatre jours à Paris	Zénaïde	Jean Canolle	TV Movie
1978	Madame le juge	Camille	Philippe Condroyer	TV Series (1 Episode)
1979	Gros-Câlin	The whore	Jean-Pierre Rawson	
1979	Et la tendresse ? ... Bordel !	Mona	Patrick Schulmann	
1979	Histoires insolites		Claude Chabrol	TV Series (1 Episode)
1979	Sam et Sally	Elena	Jean Girault (6)	TV Series (1 Episode)
1980	The Fiendish Plot of Dr. Fu Manchu	Tour Guide	Piers Haggard	
1980	Haine	The mother	Dominique Goult	
1980	L'oeil du maître	The speakerin	Stéphane Kurc	
1980	Frénésie tzigane	Yolana	Georges Paumier	TV Movie
1980	Histoires étranges	Paulin's secretary	Peter Kassovitz	TV Mini-Series
1980	Fantômas	The friend	Claude Chabrol (2)	TV Mini-Series
1980	Petit déjeuner compris		Michel Berny	TV Mini-Series
1981	Le bahut va craquer	Francis's sister	Michel Nerval	
1981	Staline est mort	Svetlana	Yves Ciampi	TV Movie
1981	La double vie de Théophraste Longuet	Emilie	Yannick Andréi	TV Movie
1981	Paris-Porto-Vecchio	Gladys	Anne Revel	TV Movie
1981	La route fleurie	Florida	Jean-Roger Cadet	TV Movie
1982	Mon Curé Chez les Nudistes	Gladys	Robert Thomas	
1982	Qu'est-ce qui fait courir David ?	Rose	Élie Chouraqui	
1982	On n'est pas sorti de l'auberge	Madame Courdu	Max Pécas	
1982	Servantes iz Malog Mista	The Swedish woman	Daniel Marušić	
1982	Qu'est-ce qui fait craquer les filles...	Madame Zerbini	Michel Vocoret (2)	
1983	L'émir préfère les blondes	The blond	Alain Payet	
1983	C'est facile et ça peut rapporter... 20 ans	Virginie Moreno	Tomás Aznar & Jean Luret	
1983	Mon curé chez les Thaïlandaises	Louise	Robert Thomas (2)	
1983	Les brigades du Tigre	Natacha	Victor Vicas	TV Series (1 Episode)
1984	American Dreamer	Embassy Guest	Rick Rosenthal	
1984	Premier pas		Christophe Barry	Short
1984	Disparitions	Jenny	Yves Ellena	TV Series (1 Episode)
1985	Code Name: Emerald	Marie Claude	Jonathan Sanger	
1985	Bâton rouge	DASS's director	Rachid Bouchareb	
1985	Bulman	Irenya Konstantinovnia	Roger Tucker	TV Series (1 Episode)
1985	Clémence Aletti	Natacha	Peter Kassovitz (2)	TV Series (1 Episode)
1986	Claire	Adèle	Lazare Iglesis (3)	TV Movie
1986	Médecins de nuit		Jean-Pierre Prévost	TV Series (1 Episode)
1986	Demain l'amour	Eva Lorié	Emmanuel Fonlladosa & Pierre Goutas	TV Series (1 Episode)
1987	Club de rencontres	Paméla	Michel Lang	
1987	Marc et Sophie	Sylvette	Georges Bensoussan	TV Series (1 Episode)
1987	Les enquêtes du commissaire Maigret	Countess Palmieri	Jean-Paul Carrère	TV Series (1 Episode)
1988	Vivement lundi	Monique	Didier Albert	TV Series (1 Episode)
1992	Moon and Son	Madame Pommier	Ken Grieve	TV Series (1 Episode)
1994	Paris Melody		Youra Bouditchenko	Short
1998	Madeline	Mrs. Uzbekistani Ambassador	Daisy von Scherler Mayer	
1998	Ronin	Woman Hostage	John Frankenheimer	
1998	On va nulle part et c'est très bien	Linntou	Jean-Claude Jean	
1999	Wo de 1919	Jeanne's mother	Jian-zhong Huang	
1999	Revient le jour		Jean-Louis Lorenzi	TV Movie
2001	Day Off	Huguette Lepange	Pascal Thomas	
2002	Deng Xiaoping		Yinnan Ding	
2002	72 heures	Isabelle Mandelieu	Olivier Panchot & Eric Summer	TV Series (1 Episode)
2003	De soie et de cendre	Rachel Zamelsky	Jacques Otmezguine	TV Movie
2004	Ariane Ferry	Irina Mychkine	Gérard Cuq	TV Series (1 Episode)
2005	Trois couples en quête d'orages	Hélène	Jacques Otmezguine (2)	
2005	Confession d'un menteur	Joana	Didier Grousset	TV Movie
2006	Antonio Vivaldi, un prince à Venise	Madame Wahler	Jean-Louis Guillermou	
2006	Le chapeau du p'tit Jésus	Anne-Marie	Didier Grousset (2)	TV Movie
2008	Transporter 3	Leonid's secretary	Olivier Megaton	
2008	Le sanglot des anges	Noémie	Jacques Otmezguine (3)	TV Mini-Series
2009	Aïcha	Bernadette	Yamina Benguigui	TV Series (1 Episode)
2012	On the Other Side of the Tracks	The keeper of the Aviary	David Charhon	
2012	Associés contre le crime: L'oeuf d'Ambroise	Mademoiselle Sakhaline	Pascal Thomas (2)	
2012	Je retourne chez ma mère	Odette	Williams Crépin	TV Movie
2012	Le jour où tout a basculé	Andrée Jouhaud	Luc Chalifour & Gilles Maillard	TV Series (2 Episodes)
2012-14	La Smala s'en mêle	Madame Dardel	Didier Grousset (3) & Pascal Lahmani	TV Series (4 Episodes)
2013	Casting	Madame Clapied	Franck Tempesti	Short
2017	Sous le même toit	Chantal	Dominique Farrugia	

== Theater ==
Year	Title	Author	Director
1969	Charlie	Donald Driver	Jean Babilée
1970	Le Cœur sous le paillasson	Harold Brooke & Kay Bannerman	Michel Vocoret
1974	Norman, Is That You?	Sam Bobrick & Ron Clark	Michel Roux
1975	Fiesta	Francis Lopez	Francis Lopez
1978	Pas un navire à l'horizon	Henri Mitton	Claude Confortès
1978	4 jours à Paris	Francis Lopez	Francis Lopez (2)
1979-80	Comédie pour un meurtre	Jean-Jacques Bricaire & Maurice Lasaygues	Dominique Nohain
1980	The Importance of Being Earnest	Oscar Wilde	Jacques François
1980	À cor et à cri	Jean Baudard	Daniel Crouet
1980	Hold-Up	Jean Stuart	Michel Vocoret (2)
1981	Les pas perdus	Pierre Gascar	Jacques Mauclair
1981	La Cruche	Georges Courteline & Pierre Wolff	Robert Manuel
1981	La Route Fleurie	Francis Lopez	Francis Lopez (3)
1982	Je l'aimais trop	Jean Guitton	Michel Roux (2)
1982	Un amour de femme	Michel Rivgauche & Gérard Calvi	Jean Meyer
1984	Le Mal de test	Ira Wallach	Raymond Gérôme
1984	Nono	Sacha Guitry	Robert Manuel (2)
1984	Le Bluffeur	Marc Camoletti	Marc Camoletti
2000	Phèdre 2000	Yves Guéna	Philippe Rondest
2009	La Salle de bain	Astrid Veillon	Olivier Macé & Jean-Pierre Dravel
2009-10	L'Alpenage de Knobst	Jean-Loup Horwitz	Xavier Lemaire
2012	Ma belle-mère et moi	Bruno Druart	Luq Hamett
