= Jean Luret =

French director, producer and screenwriter

- Born: 6 August 1952
- Occupation: Director · Producer · Screenwriter

Jean Luret (born 6 August 1952) is a French director, producer and screenwriter.

== Career ==
At the end of high school, to improve his English, Luret went to live in London.

In 1978, Luret founded Cinémadis, a production company and film distribution. During this period, he began creating feature films, including Baisers exotiques; Comme des bêtes, with Michel Galabru, Robert Castel, Katia Tchenko, and Jacques Balutin; Exotic Kisses; and Like Animals (a feature film with the voice of animal Claude Piéplu).

In 1986, Luret entered the fashion world by conducting interviews with celebrities who are still shown on television. Luret has an archive of over 2,000 hours of footage and interviews with celebrities of all kinds. These records are classified, scanned, indexed, and made available to researchers.

In the early 1990s, Luret created for fashion houses hundreds of corporate videos on fashion shows. As a result, he obtained the recognition of this medium and the confidence of designers, which allows him even today to work with leading fashion houses.

In parallel with this activity, Luret produced and directed for French television documentary series, including:

- Paris Chic, anthologie de la mode – 35 episodes of 26 minutes each; broadcast on Planète+
- Arts de vivre – 12 episodes of 26 minutes each; broadcast on Odyssée
- Paris Glamour – 12 episodes of 26 minutes each; broadcast on NRJ 12

Documentaries of 52 minutes include:

- Black Beauty – broadcast on France Ô
- Katoucha, le destin tragique d'un top model – broadcast on France 3

With JLP Movies, Luret's activity consists in creating, for companies and private individuals, short and promotional films for websites.

== Filmography ==
=== Director ===
==== Films ====
- 1975 - The Daughter of Emanuelle
- 1982 – Les petites têtes
- 1984 – C'est facile et ça peut rapporter... 20 ans
- 1985 – Adam et Ève
- 1988 – Comme des bêtes

==== Documentaries ====
===== Documentaries of 52 minutes =====
- Folies Berrichonnes
- Comme des bêtes
- Folies Villageoises
- Fashion, Oh la la
- Body-mania
- L'hiver de la Haute Couture
- Ah la Mode
- Noire Beauté
- La Mode des Grands Créateurs
- Les deux pieds dans le terroir
- Paris, Capitale de la Mode
- Voyage en Haute Lingerie
- L’Homme parfait
- La Femme parfaite
- Katoucha, le destin tragique d’un top model
- L'extravagant destin de Geneviève de Fontenay
- L'intrigant destin d’un Transformiste, Michou
- Raymond Poulidor
