= La grenade =

2018 song by Clara Luciani

Single by Clara Luciani

from the album Sainte-Victoire
- Released: 6 April 2018
- Genre: French pop
- Length: 3:14
- Songwriters: Clara Luciani; Sage
- Producers: Benjamin Lebeau; Sage

Music video
- "La grenade" on YouTube

"La grenade" is a song by French singer Clara Luciani released in 2018. Commercially, the song has charted in Belgium where it peaked at number five and reached the top thirty in France.

== Charts ==
=== Weekly charts ===
Chart (2018–2019)	Peak position
Belgium (Ultratop 50 Wallonia)	5
France (SNEP)	22

=== Year-end charts ===
Chart (2018)	Position
Belgium (Ultratop Wallonia)	17
Chart (2019)	Position
France (SNEP)	50

== Certifications ==
Region	Certification	Certified units/sales
France (SNEP)	Diamond	333,333^{‡}
^{‡} Sales+streaming figures based on certification alone.
