= La Briochée =

French drag performer

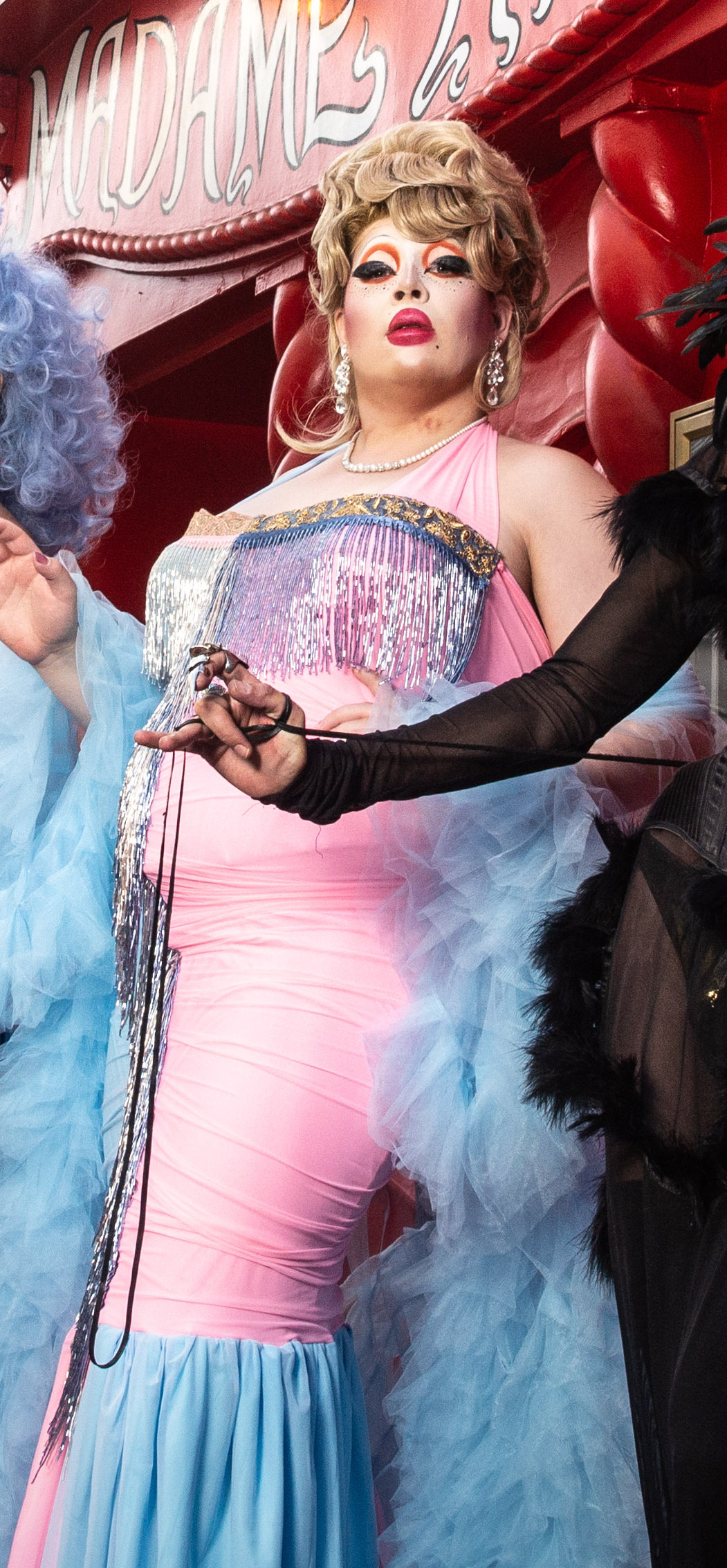
- La Briochée in 2022
- Born: Maëva Trioux
- Occupation: Drag performer
- Television: Drag Race France (season 1)

Maëva Trioux (French: [maeva tʁiju]), professionally known as La Briochée (French: [la bʁijɔʃe]), is a French drag performer who competed on the first season of Drag Race France.
