= Chez Michou =

Cabaret in Paris

Coordinates: 48°52′58.94″N 2°20′23.28″E

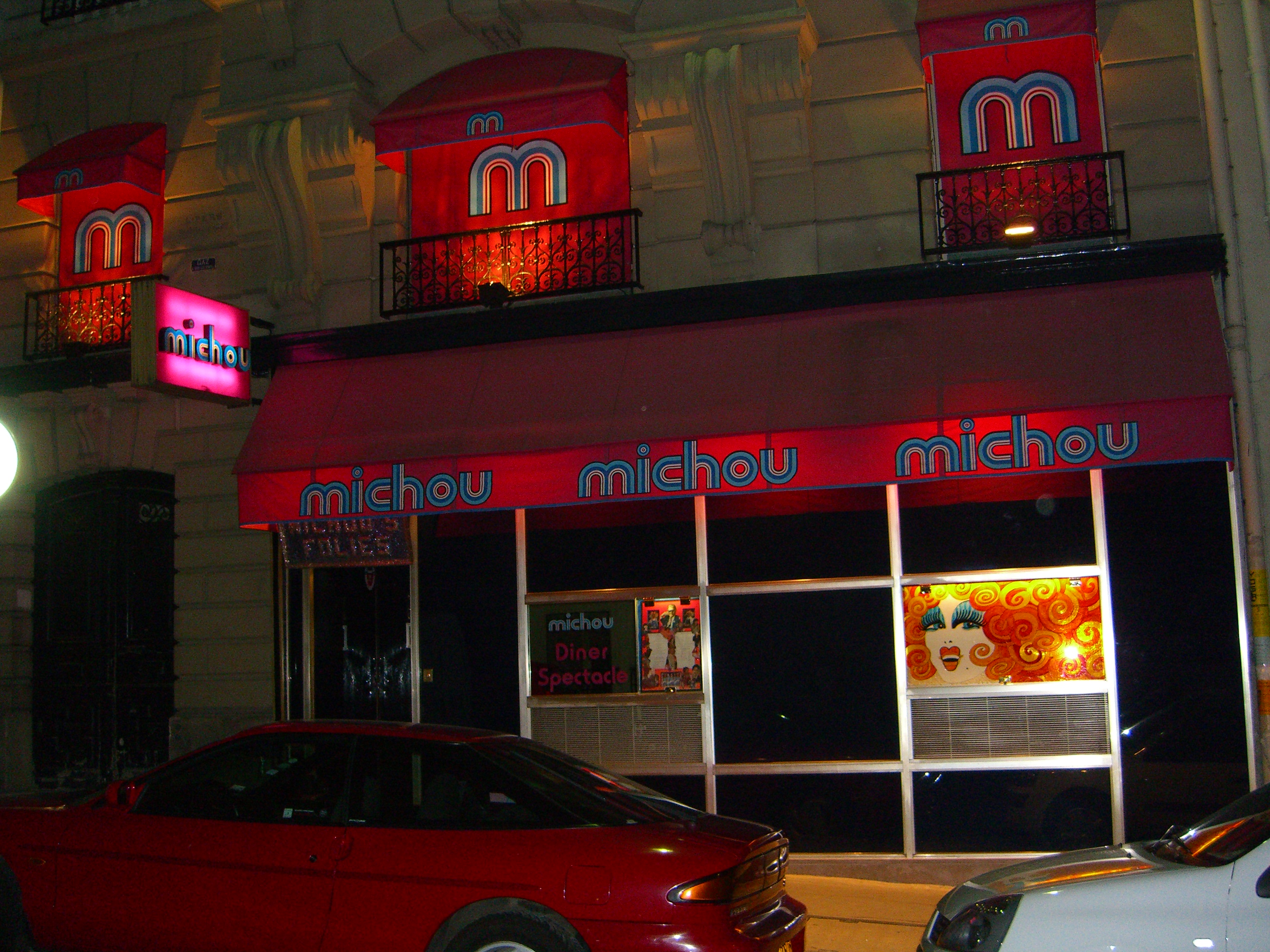
Chez Michou

Chez Michou was a drag cabaret in Paris, that existed for 58 years. Located in the Montmartre cabaret district of the 18th arrondissement, it was founded in 1956. It was run by the cabaret artist Michou until his death in 2020. The cabaret inspired the 1978 French film La Cage aux Folles.

On 1 July 2024, Chez Michou announced that it would be closing for financial reasons.
