= La Grande Dame =

French singer and drag performer

La Grande Dame - Yann
- Yan at Paris Pride 2026 concert
- Born: Yannick Martin; 19 March 1999 (age 27); Nice, France
- Other name: Yann
- Occupations: Singer, songwriter, performer Drag queen
- Notable work: Parfum Orange
- Television: Drag Race France (season 1); RuPaul's Drag Race: UK vs. the World (series 2)

Yannick "Yann" Martin (born March 19, 1999), known by the stage names La Grande Dame and Yann, is a French drag queen, singer-songwriter, and model. He rose to prominence as a contestant on the first season of Drag Race France in 2022 and the second series of RuPaul's Drag Race: UK vs. the World in 2024, reaching the finale in both.

== Personal life ==
La Grande Dame grew up in Nice. At age 14, he left home. Two years later, he found herself in the foster care system.

== Career ==
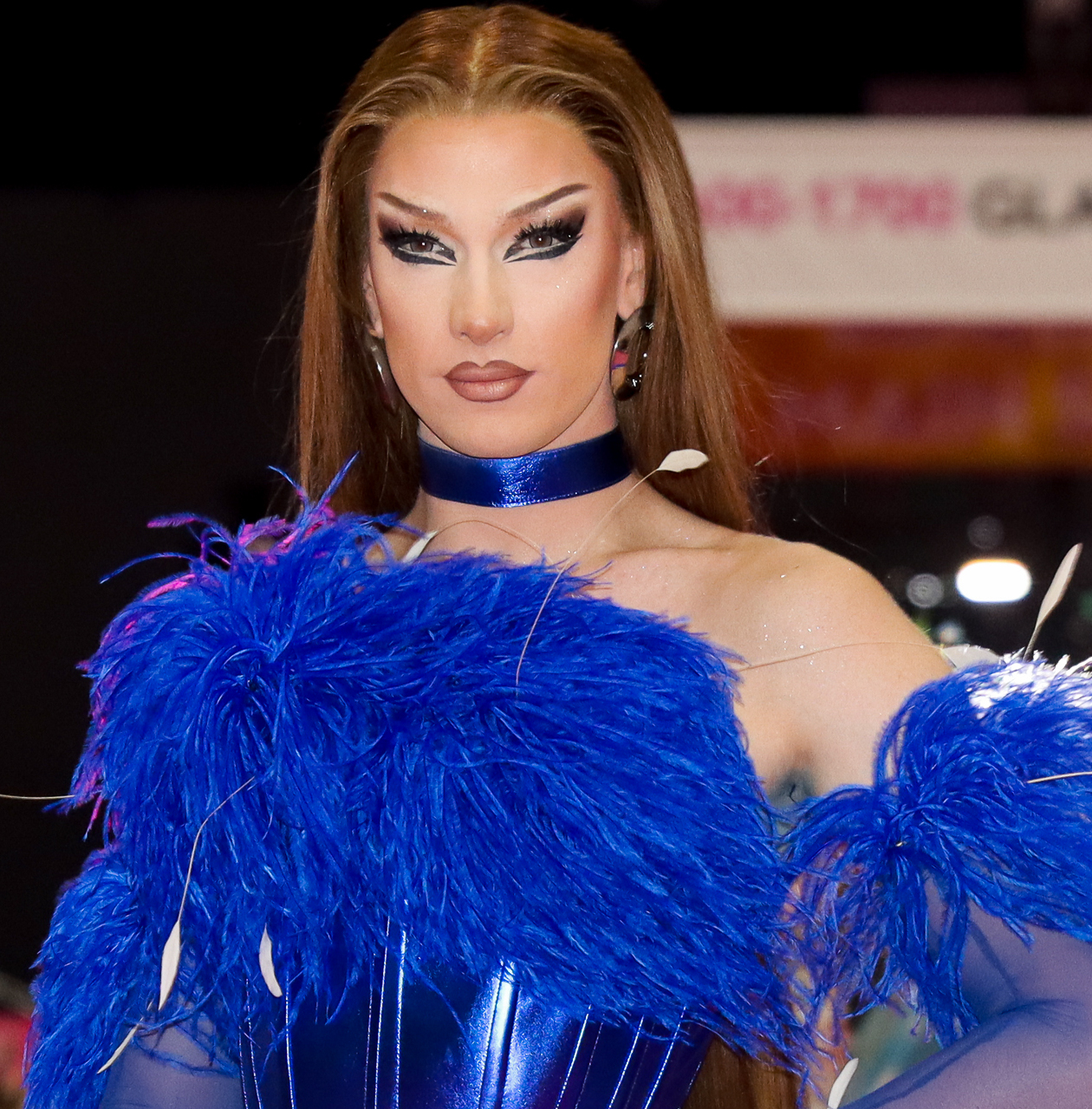
La Grande Dame at RuPaul's DragCon LA 2024

La Grande Dame started doing drag in 2018.

In 2020, he was a model at Jean Paul Gaultier's farewell show at Châtelet. She was since also a model for Victor Weinsanto, Kevin Germanier, Charles de Vilmorin and Alexandre Blanc and walked for Paris Fashion Week.

He competed on the first season of Drag Race France (2022), where he was a runner-up, and the second series of RuPaul's Drag Race: UK vs. the World (2024), where he was a finalist.

In February 2025, La Grande Dame is set to release an album, with an album cover shot by Swiss designer Kevin Germanier.

== Filmography ==
=== Cinema ===
- 2022 : Paloma directed by Hugo Bardin (short film) : Herself
- 2022 : Three Nights a Week (Trois nuits par semaine) directed by Florent Gouëlou : Juror Drag Olympus

=== Television ===
- 2021 : Emily in Paris, season 2, episode 1 Voulez-vous coucher avec moi ? directed by Andrew Fleming : Drag Queen
- 2022 : Drag Race France, season 1 : Herself
- 2024 : RuPaul's Drag Race: UK vs. the World, series 2 : Herself
- 2024: Touch-Ups with Raven
- 2024: Bring Back My Girls

=== Music videos ===
- 2024 : Dada directed by Laetitia Desnous and James MacIver
- 2024 : Parfum Orange directed by Christopher Barraja
