= Sam Bourcier =

French sociologist and docent

Sam Bourcier is a French sociologist and lecturer at Charles de Gaulle University – Lille III. They are a transfeminist and queer activist. According to Bourcier's twitter, they use the French gender-neutral neopronoun iel.

They are the author of numerous books and articles on queer cultures, theories and politics, sexual subcultures (such as BDSM), feminism, transfeminism, minorities, and identity politics in France and abroad.

== Life ==
Sam Bourcier was born Marie-Hélène Bourcier on 30 October 1963 in Berlin, where their father was an infantry colonel. They studied at the Maison d'éducation de la Légion d'honneur in Saint-Germain-en-Laye. Bourcier later studied at the École Normale Supérieure de Saint-Cloud (class of 1982), where they defended a doctoral thesis in 1988. They have described themself as the "child of French post-structuralism."

Bourcier has played an important role in the introduction of queer theory into France through public seminars (the "Q Seminars," which ran from 1996 to 1998) and their trilogy Queer Zones (2001–2006). They also have translated the work of French-American writer Monique Wittig, Italian-American academic Teresa de Lauretis and the Spanish writer Paul B. Preciado into French.

From September 2000 to June 2001, Bourcier was invited to New York University as part of a Fulbright fellowship, with the post-doctoral subject Queer Theory and French Philosophy: The Politics of Inverted Translation.

In 2002, Bourcier founded the group Archilesb, which advocates for the inclusion of lesbian history in Paris's planned gay history archive centre. More broadly, Bourcier has criticised exclusion within LGBTQI communities.

Although Bourcier underwent a Lacanian analysis for seven years, they have since taken a public position against Lacanianism and the psychiatrization of trans identity.
