= Lova Ladiva =

French drag performer

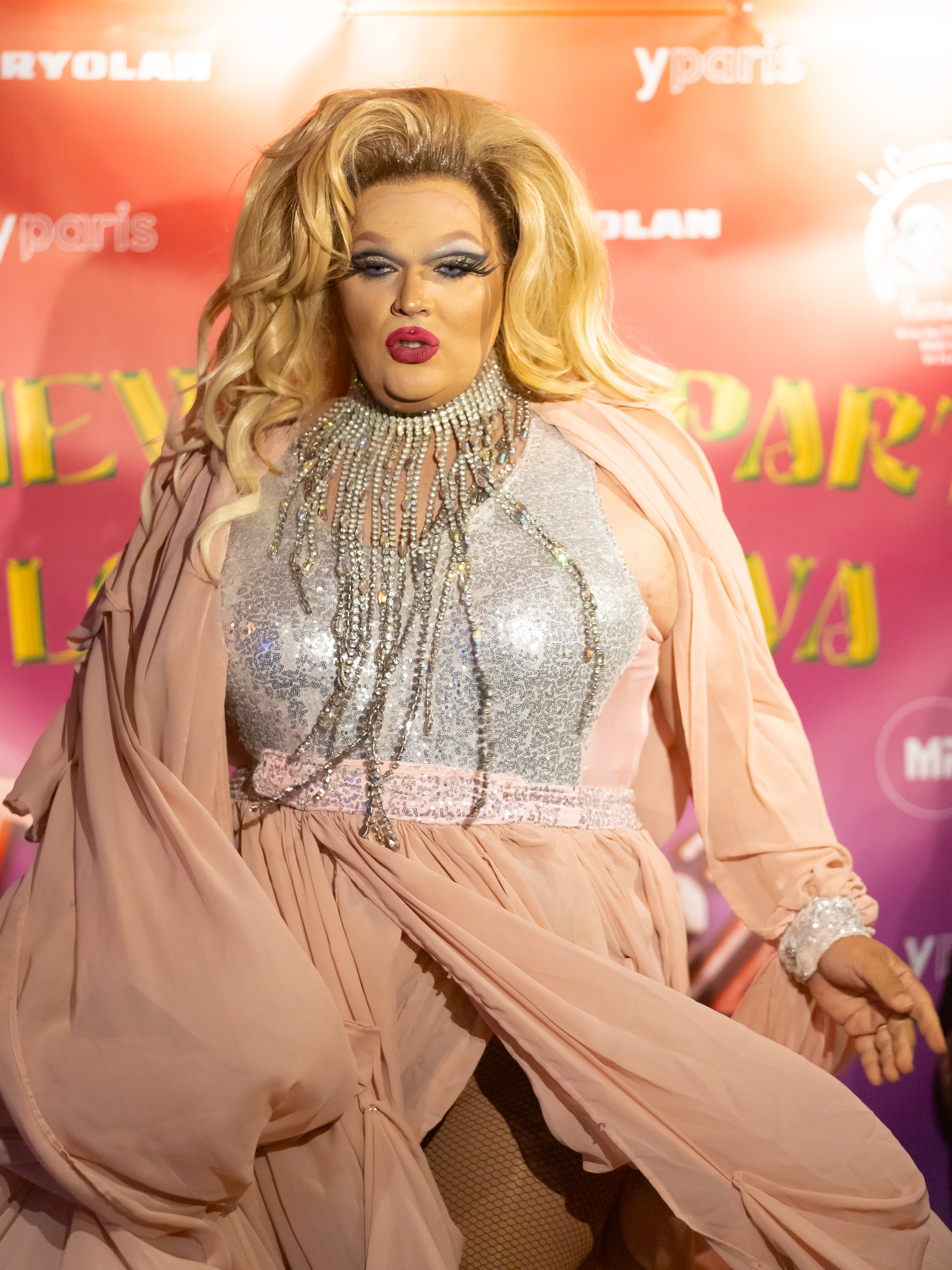
- Lova Ladiva in 2023
- Born: Sébastien Ducellier
- Occupation: Drag queen
- Television: Drag Race France (season 1)

Lova Ladiva is the stage name of Sébastien Ducellier, a French drag performer who competed on the first season of Drag Race France.
