= La Big Bertha =

French drag performer

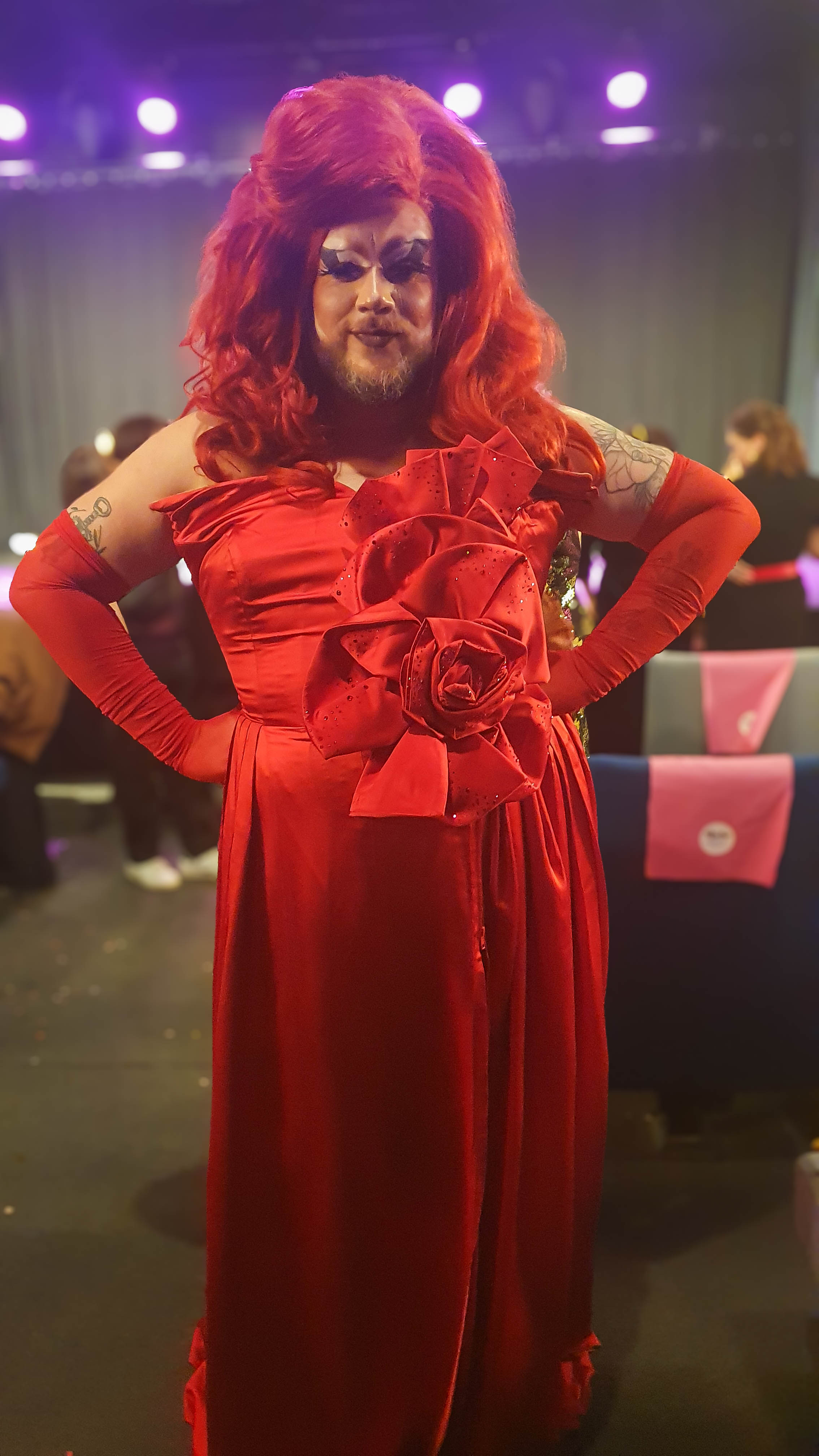
- La Big Bertha in 2024
- Born: Loïc Assemat; Castres, Occitania, France
- Occupation: Drag queen
- Television: Drag Race France (season 1)

La Big Bertha is the stage name of Loïc Assemat, a French drag performer who competed on the first seasons of Drag Race France and Drag Race France All Stars. Born in Castres, she is based in Paris and performs at le Nouveau Casino.

== Filmography ==
- Drag Race France All Stars (2025)
