= Lolita Banana =

Drag performer

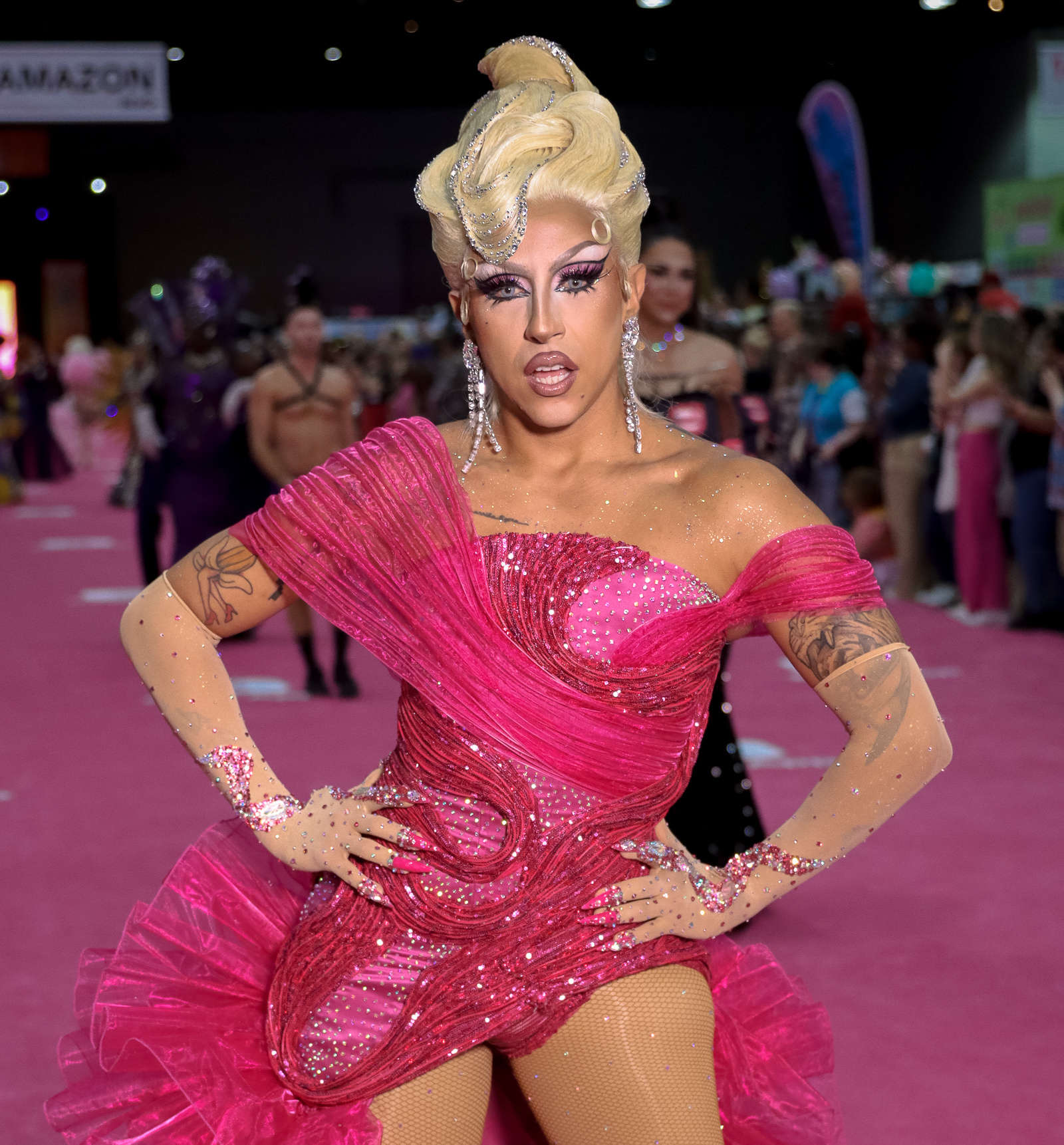
- Lolita Banana at RuPaul's DragCon LA, 2023
- Born: Esteban Inzúa; Mexico City, Mexico
- Television: Drag Race France (season 1); Drag Race México
- Website: lolitabanana.com

Lolita Banana is the stage name of Esteban Inzúa, a Mexican drag performer who competed on the first season of Drag Race France. In 2023, she was announced as the co-host of Drag Race México.

== Career ==
Inzúa discovered drag while working as a dancer in 2018. He has performed at le Café de Paris and the B Boat, among other venues.

Inzúa competed as Lolita Banana on the first season of Drag Race France. She was the first contestant born in Mexico to compete in a Drag Race series. She shaved her head during one lip sync battle, and ultimately placed in the top four.

At RuPaul's Drag Con LA 2023, she was announced as one of the hosts for Drag Race México.

== Personal life ==
Originally from Mexico City, Inzúa lives in Paris, as of 2022. He is HIV-positive.

== Filmography ==
=== Television ===
Year	Title	Role	Notes	Ref.
2022	Drag Race France	Herself/Contestant	4th place	
2023-present	Drag Race México	Herself	Co-host	
2023	The Drag Race France Phenomenon: One Year with the Queens	Herself	France 2 documentary	
2023	Les Voyages de Nicky	Herself	France 5 documentary	
2025	Bring Back My Girls	Herself	Season 4 Episode 5	
2026	Drag Race Mexico - Latina Royale	Herself	Co-host	

== See also ==
- List of drag queens
- List of HIV-positive people
