= Michou (cabaret artist) =

French cabaret director

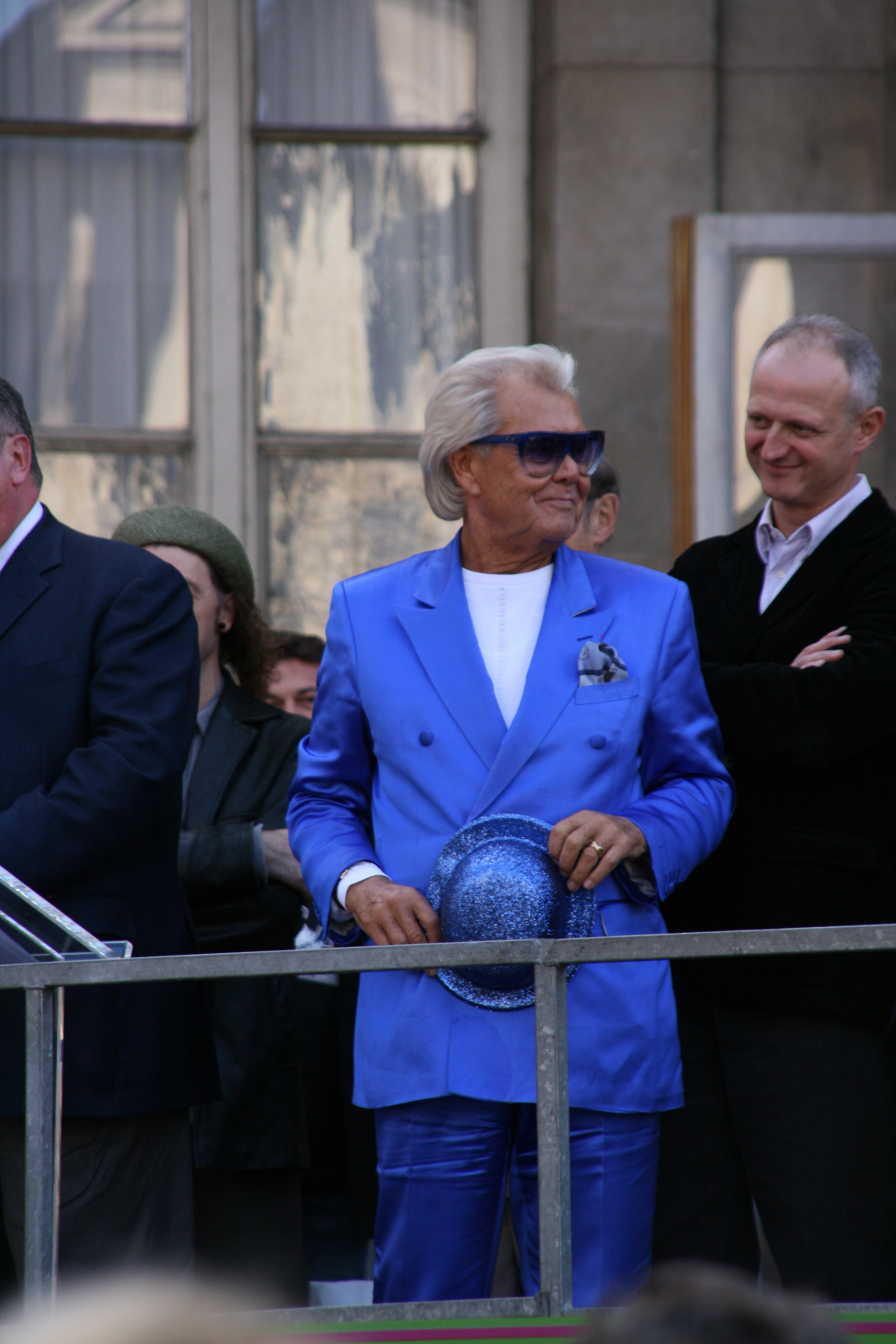
- Born: Michel Catty; 18 June 1931; Amiens, France
- Died: 26 January 2020 (aged 88); Saint-Mandé, France
- Occupation: Director of Cabaret
- Partner: Erwann Toularastel

Michel Georges Alfred Catty (18 June 1931 – 26 January 2020), known as Michou, was a French singer, drag artist and owner of Chez Michou in Montmartre. He was born in Amiens. A local celebrity, he appeared in a cameo as himself in the 1973 film Happy New Year directed by Claude Lelouch. In 1973 he also played the part of Beauchamp in the TV series Molière pour rire et pour pleurer, directed by Marcel Camus.

He was the subject of Jean Luret's documentary L'intrigant destin d’un Transformiste. In the 1980s, he was regularly invited on French TV. He was made a chevalier de la Légion d'honneur in 2005.

== Biography ==
With no training, he moved to Paris in the early 1950s and worked in odd jobs, then he started dealing with the night scene. He also disguised himself by imitating France Gall or Brigitte Bardot. He was the director of the Cabaret Michou, located 80 rue des Martyrs in the 18th arrondissement of the capital. He also released several singles.

Michou adopted an extravagant and kitschy clothing appearance, including famous blue glasses and a discoloured brushing. He made no secret of his homosexuality. He died at the age of 88 on 26 January 2020 in Saint-Mandé.

== Discography ==
- 1972 : Si tu f'sais du tandem avec moi
- 1973 : Quoi mon chou ?
- 1974 : Plus joli qu'une fleur
- 1974 : Qu'est-ce qui m'attend à la rentrée ? / Le clown sur la piste
- 1978 : Fofolle
- 1978 : L'homme à femmes
- 1978 : Moi j'suis Michou
- 1989 : Le bataillon de chez Michou
- 1989 : Les fricoteuses
- 1989 : Le cabaret qui défend les droits de l'homme
- 2001 : Michou, c'est qui ?, « chanson-biographie » for his 70th birthday.
- 2005 : Signé Michou
- 2008 : Michoumania
- 2011 : 80, rue des martyrs
