= Toulouse Pride =

Annual LGBT event in Toulouse, France

Toulouse Pride Marche des fiertés de Toulouse
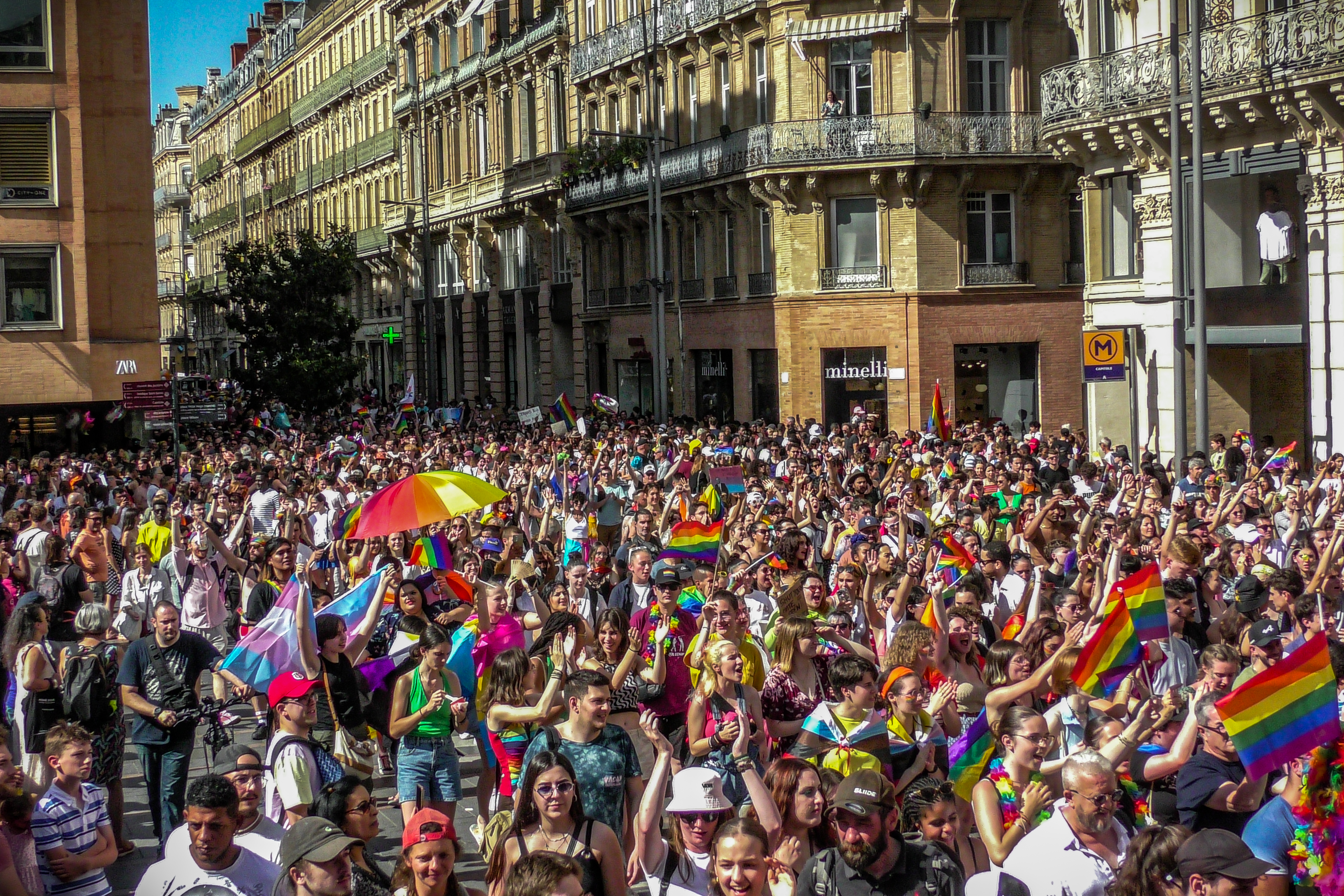
- The Toulouse pride march, 10 June 2023
- Status: Active
- Genre: Pride parade and festival
- Frequency: Annually
- Location: City of Toulouse
- Country: France
- Inaugurated: June 1994
- Area: Downtown Toulouse
- Organiser: Pride Toulouse
- Website: pridetoulouse.com

The Toulouse Pride (French: Marche des fiertés de Toulouse) is a parade taking place every year since 1994, in the French city of Toulouse.

== History ==
The first edition of the march took place in 1994, and has since become a major LGBT event in southwestern France.

In 2013, year of the legalisation of same-sex marriage in France, the beginning of the parade took place in the front of the city hall, the Capitole, in the same time than the first same-sex marriage in Toulouse was celebrated inside the building.

In the 2014 edition of the march, a conflict between some demonstrators and the LGBT organization of the National Police, Flag!, happened.

In 2017, the prefecture of Haute-Garonne department, where Toulouse is located, orders new safety rules, that has to be paid by organizers, for public demonstrations; which would mean 20.000 euros of additional expenses. Act-Up Sud Ouest sees there an indirect way of trying to censor the demonstration, while the prefecture believes their expectations to be justified because of terrorist menace. Relations between Pride parade's organizers and the prefecture are under tension again in 2021, when the latter wants to change the route of the parade. Following a mobilisation of the LGBT community, with a petition to residents of the route and the categorical refusal of changing the route at the risk of cancelling completely the demonstration, the march finally takes place on the habitual route.

This event gives place to other events in the city, like the illumination of the Capitole with the colors of the LGBT flag, or sometimes of the Pont Neuf too.

In 2020, because of COVID-19 pandemic, the parade is cancelled. For this same reason, in 2021 it happened exceptionally in October instead of June.

=== Number of demonstrators ===
Year	Number of demonstrators
2000	8000
2011	8000
2012	10.000 to 20.000
2013	13.000 (prefecture) to 25.000 (organizations)
2014	6000 (prefecture) to 30.000 (organizations)
2015	25.000
2018	14.000 (prefecture) to 30.000 (organizations)
2023	15.000 (prefecture) to 30.000 (organizations)

== Relations with the municipality of Toulouse ==
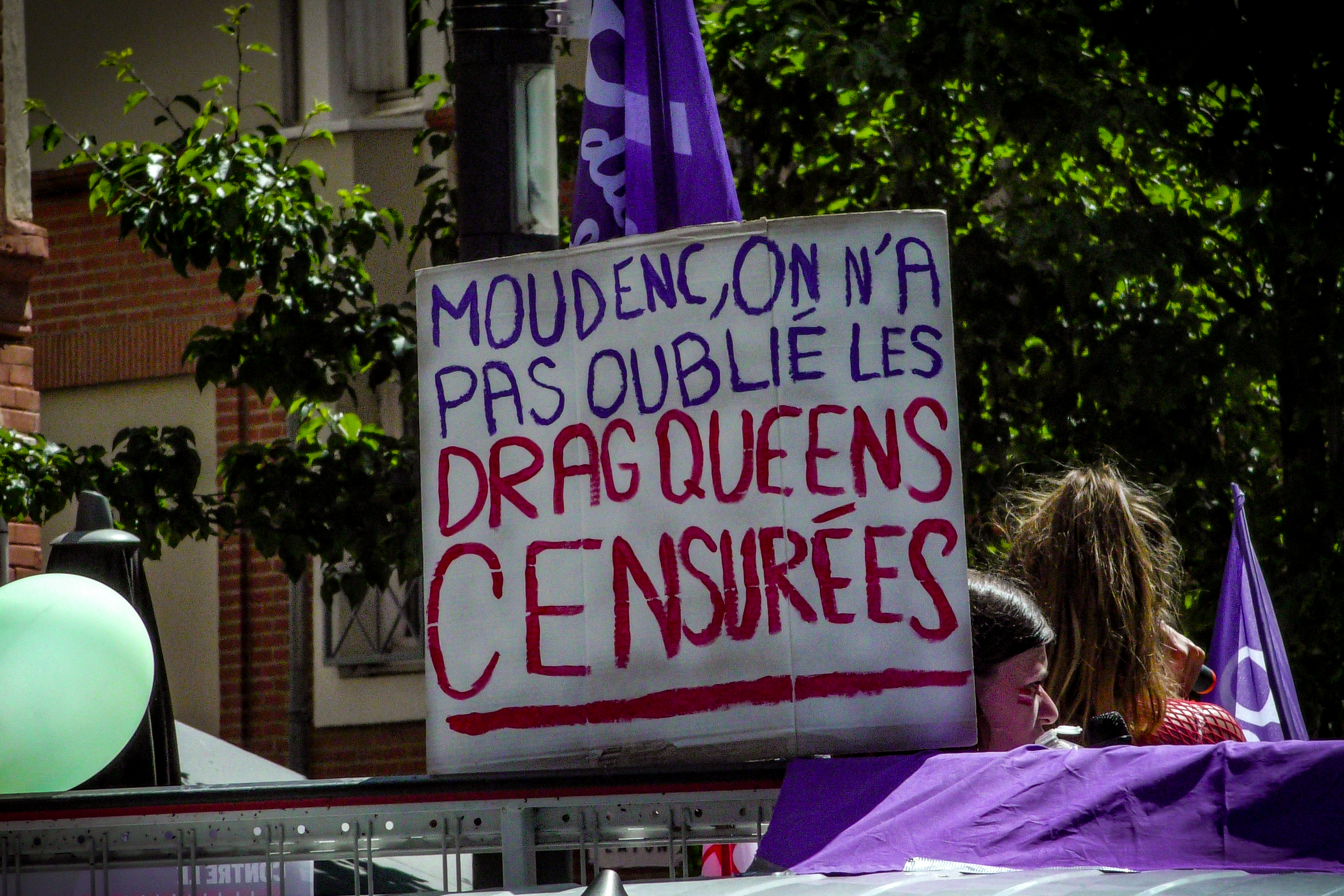
Sign against the mayor of Toulouse, Jean-Luc Moudenc, in the 2023 parade.

Nowadays, the municipality of Toulouse is one of the partners of the yearly parade. The relations between both don't always have been good however.

In 1999, it has been qualified as an "indecent show" by one of the officials, and the location of the starting point of the parade was moved the day before from Capitole Place to Saint-Étienne Place.

In 2009, mayor of Toulouse Pierre Cohen, member of the PS, was part of the parade and invited other officials of the city to do so, wearing the official tricolor sash.

In 2013, mayor Pierre Cohen celebrated the first same-sex marriage of Toulouse, just before the beginning of the parade. During that same parade, a "wall of homophobics" was displayed on the Capitole Place, and the name of Jean-Luc Moudenc, who became the new mayor of Toulouse a year after, was displayed on it. Jean-Luc Moudenc used to be part of the Manif pour Tous, which was protesting against the legalisation of same-sex marriage in France.

In 2018, the municipality refuses to accept the request of Pride Toulouse to light up the Pont Neuf with LGBT flag lights, first saying it was due to technical difficulties, even if the bridge has been light up in green for Saint Patrick's Day; then saying the monument wasn't there to "carry debates". After a standoff of some days with the municipality, the request will finally be accepted.

== Impact ==
=== In Toulouse and its metropolitan area ===
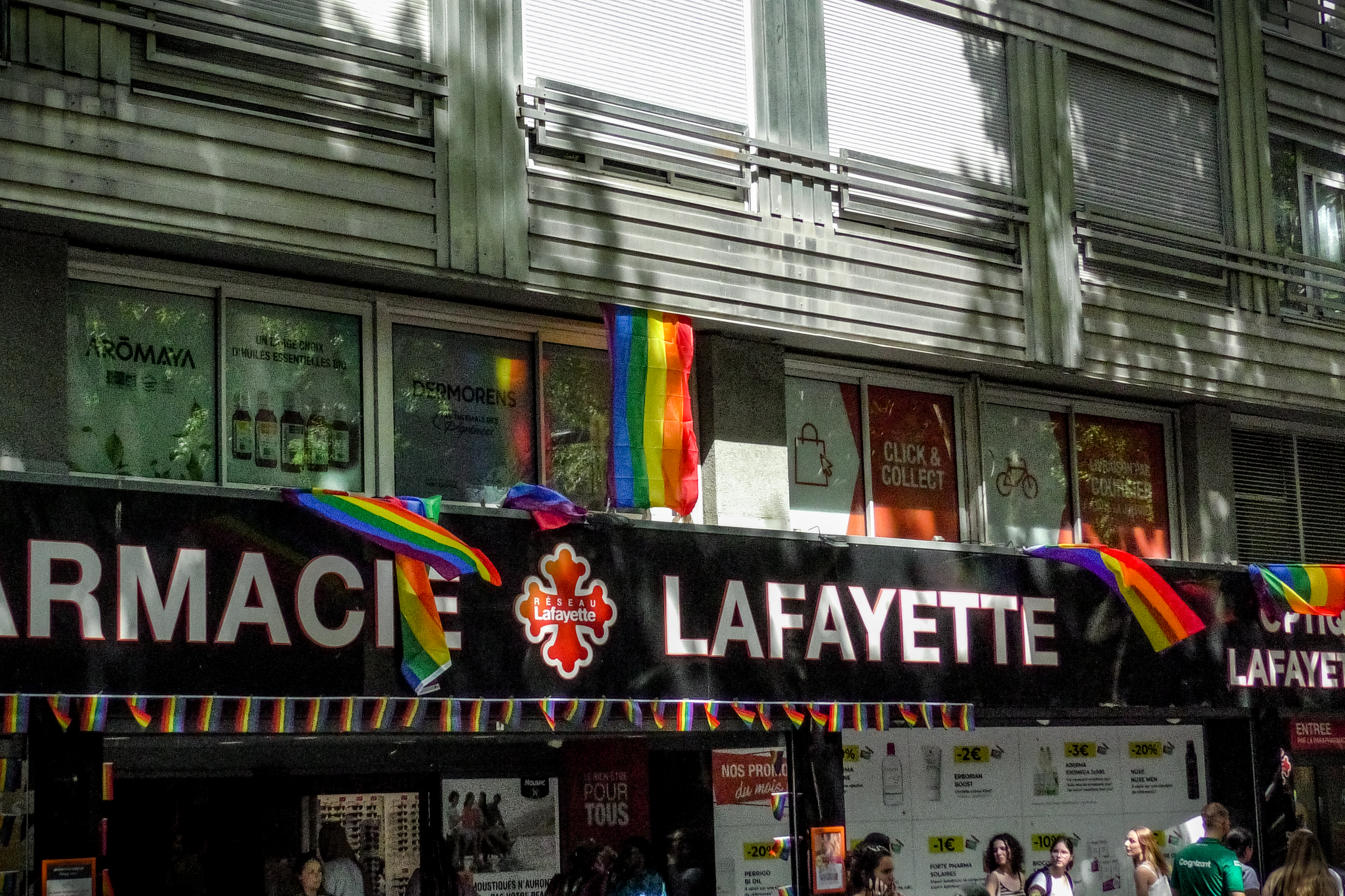
Lafayette Pharmacy of Strasbourg Boulevard, decorated for Toulouse Pride 2023.

The parade eventually became over years a major event of the city of Toulouse. For this occasion, lot of companies, institutions, businesses, organizations and even medias are taking part of the event, directly or indirectly. An "associative village" is also installed all day long on the Capitole Place during that day.

=== In the region ===
Because of its importance, the Toulouse Pride parade is attracting participants from far beyond the Toulouse metropolitan area. The SNCF sometimes do a special pricing for regional trains during that day, to make it easier for people to reach the parade.
