= Nicky Doll =

French drag queen

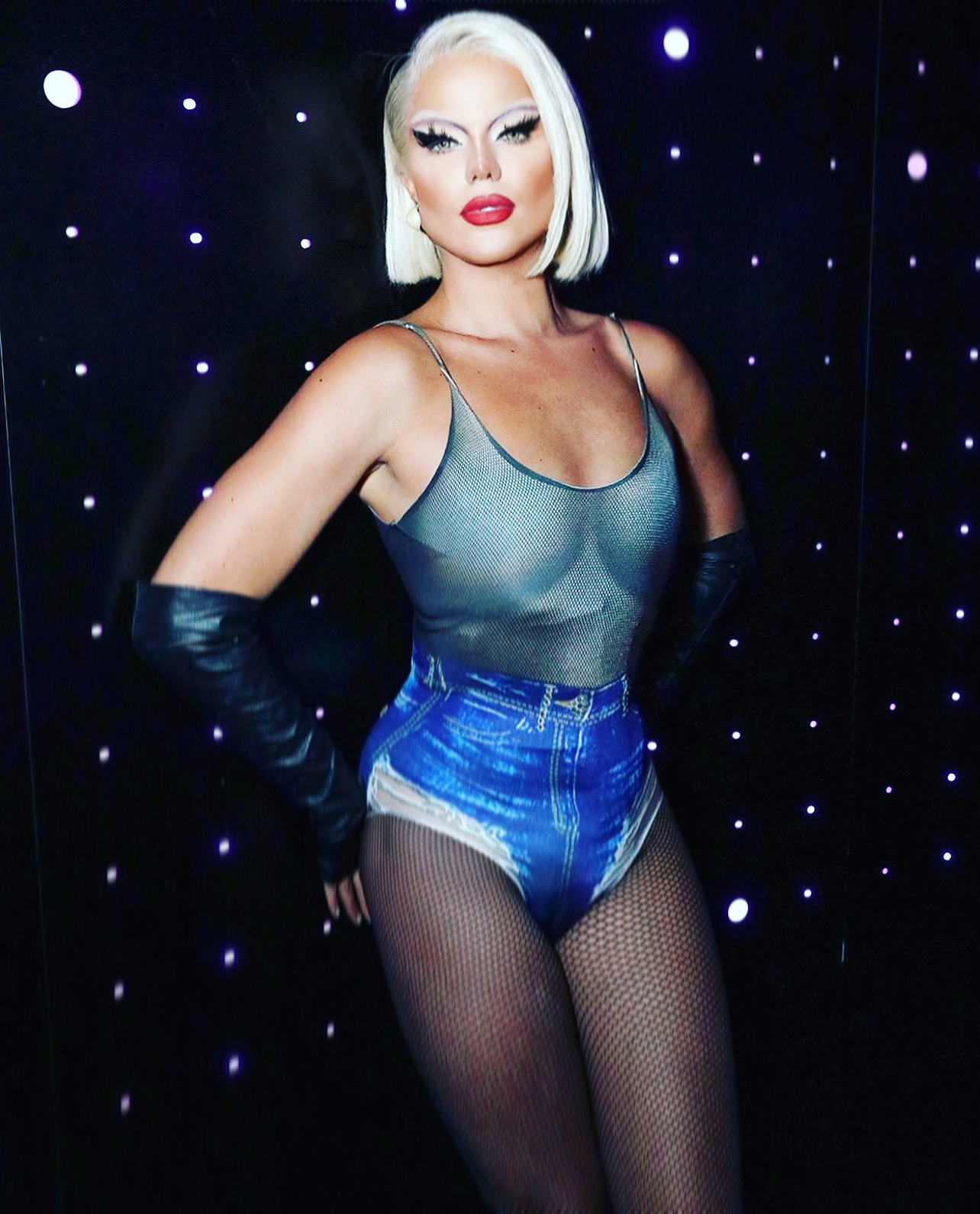
- Nicky Doll in 2022
- Born: 14 March 1991 (age 35); Marseille, France
- Occupations: Drag queen; television personality; musician
- Years active: 2009–present
- Known for: Drag Race France; Drag Race France All Stars; Les Voyages de Nicky; RuPaul's Drag Race (season 12)
- Musical career
- Genres: Pop; French pop; Dance-pop
- Instrument: Vocals
- Label: Polydor Records

Karl Sanchez (born 14 March 1991), known by the stage name Nicky Doll, is a French drag queen, television personality, and musician based in New York City.

Nicky Doll is best known as the main host of Drag Race France and a competitor on the twelfth season of RuPaul's Drag Race. She is also known for Les Voyages de Nicky, a documentary that explores gender expression, the art of drag, and LGBT activism in different countries.

== Early life ==
Sanchez was born on March 14, 1991, in Marseille, France, but also travelled quite a bit as a child, living in St. Martin and Morocco. His mother is Spanish.

== Career ==
Sanchez trained to be a make-up artist. Sanchez created the drag persona Nicky Doll in 2009 and has modeled extensively, appearing on the pages of Féroce Magazine, Cosmopolitan and Volition Magazine among others.

Nicky Doll does not belong to any drag family. Her name is a tribute to Nicki Minaj and is meant to evoke versatility. Nicky Doll has described herself as a 90's life-size doll.

Nicky Doll's participation on season 12 of RuPaul’s Drag Race was announced on January 23, 2020. She is the first French contestant on the US version of the show. She has been described as a ‘look queen’ and has spoken openly about “deep insecurities when it comes to the language barrier” that she experienced during the show. As a result of her appearance on Drag Race, Nicky Doll was hand-picked by RuPaul to do Pete Davidson's makeup for a pre-recorded sketch on an episode of Saturday Night Live which was hosted by RuPaul.

In March 2022, Nicky Doll was announced as the host of Drag Race France. The first season of Drag Race France premiered on June 25, 2022. Drag Race France All Stars was announced in November 2024, after 3 seasons of Drag Race France. In addition to hosting the show, Nicky Doll has headlined the Drag Race France Live tour after the airing of each season, with performances in most major French cities as well as a few stops in Belgium and Switzerland.

In 2023, Nicky Doll co-created and released a 4-part documentary series entitled Les Voyages de Nicky, which follows Nicky Doll as she explores queer communities around the world. The first season showcases India, Greece, Mexico, and Japan. The documentary had its international premiere on October 20, 2024 at the Chelsea Film Festival in New York City. In May 2024, Nicky Doll provided commentary for the French broadcast of the Eurovision Song Contest 2024 semi-finals on Culturebox. That same month, she took part in the 2024 Summer Olympics torch relay in Arles, France, becoming the second drag queen to carry the Olympic torch.

On July 26, 2024, Nicky Doll was a part of the fashion runway and dance (Festivité) segment for the televised opening ceremony of the 2024 Summer Olympics and performed her newly released single, "I had a dream". Following remarks made by Laurence Fox calling Nicky Doll and other drag performers "deviant little pedos" on Twitter during the opening ceremonies, Sanchez filed a complaint in defamation towards Fox and other social media users on August 2. Sanchez commented "I’m about to sue you again for defamation – the same exact topic that you were sued on and lost," in reference to a case won by Canadian-British drag performer Crystal against Fox for similar remarks.

== Personal life ==
Sanchez came out as gay at the age of 18. He relocated from Paris to San Francisco in 2015, before moving to Union Square, Manhattan in 2017.

== Filmography ==
=== Television ===
Year	Title	Role	Notes	Ref
2020	RuPaul's Drag Race	Herself	Contestant (11th Place)	
2020	RuPaul's Drag Race: Untucked	Herself	Contestant (11th Place)	
2020	Je t'aime etc.	Herself	Guest	
2020	Quotidien	Herself	Guest	
2022–present	Drag Race France	Herself	Host/Judge	
2022	Countdown to All Stars 7: You're A Winner Baby	Herself	Guest, VH1 special	
2022	C à vous	Herself	Guest	
2022	On est en direct	Herself	Guest with Drag Race France cast	
2023	RuPaul's Drag Race All Stars (season 8)	Lip Sync Assassin	Episode: "You're A Winner Baby!"	
2023	RuPaul's Drag Race All Stars: Untucked!	Herself	Episode: "All Stars Untucked: You're A Winner Baby!"	
2023	Les voyages de Nicky	Herself	Documentary	
2023	RuPaul's Drag Race UK	Herself	Special guest; Episode: "Tickety-Boo"	
2024	Eurovision Song Contest 2024	Herself	Commentator (semi-finals, on Culturebox)	
2024	2024 Olympics Opening Ceremony	Herself	Performer	
2024	Drag Race Thailand	Herself	Guest judge	

=== Web series ===
Year	Title	Role	Notes	Ref
2020	Miz Cracker's Review with a Jew - S12 E05	Himself	Guest	
2020	Whatcha Packin' - S12 E05	Himself	Guest	
2020	RuPaul's Drag Race: Makeup Tutorial	Herself	Guest	
2020	Gap Chat	Herself	Guest	
2020	Get Ready with Me by Vogue Paris	Herself	Guest	
2020	The X Change Rate	Herself	Guest	
2020	Beauty Call by Vogue Paris	Herself	Guest	
2020	The A.V. Club	Herself	Guest	
2020	Extra-Ordinaire	Herself	Guest	
2020	Bring Back My Ghouls	Herself	Guest	
2021	Brut. Footage	Herself	Guest	
2021	The Pit Stop - S13 E10	Herself	Guest	
2021	What's My Game?	Herself	Guest	
2021	Fashion Photo RuView	Herself	Guest	
2021	Out of the Closet	Herself	Guest	
2021	El bolso de: Nicky Doll	Herself	Guest	
2022	La Boîte à Questions	Herself	Guest	
2022	Bring Back My Girls	Herself	Guest	
2023	Give It to Me Straight	Herself	Guest	

=== Music videos ===
Year	Title	Directed
2022	"Attention"	Julian Roca-Chow
2022	"Toxic"	Dylan Perlot
2023	"Fashion Freak"	Dylan Perlot
2024	"I had a dream"	Dylan Perlot

== Discography ==
=== Featured singles ===
Year	Title	Artist
2020	"I'm That Bitch"	The Cast of RuPaul's Drag Race Season 12
2020	"The Shady Bunch"	The Cast of RuPaul's Drag Race Season 12
2022	"Attention"	Nicky Doll
2022	"Toxic"	Nicky Doll
2023	"Fashion Freak"	Nicky Doll
2024	"Don't Cha"	Nicky Doll
2024	"I had a dream"	Nicky Doll
2024	"Oublier"	Nicky Doll

== Bibliography ==
- Reines, l'art du drag à la française. Hors Collection. 2023. ISBN 9782701403977.

== Accolades ==
Award	Year	Category	Recipient(s) and nominee(s)	Result	Ref.
La Cérémonie des Têtu 2023	2023	Prix des Lecteurs	Herself	Won	

== See also ==
- Drag and the Olympic Games
- LGBTQ culture in New York City
- List of LGBTQ people from New York City
