= 1911 in music =

This is a list of notable events in music that took place in the year 1911.

== Specific locations ==
- 1911 in Norwegian music

== Specific genres ==
- 1911 in jazz

== Events ==
- January 26 – Première of the opera Der Rosenkavalier by Richard Strauss, in Dresden; the librettist is Hugo von Hofmannsthal and the director is Max Reinhardt.
- February 21 – Gustav Mahler, who has contracted bacterial endocarditis and is running a fever of 104 degrees, conducts his last concert, with the New York Philharmonic, of which he has been principal conductor since 1909.
- April 3 – Jean Sibelius conducts the world première of his Symphony No. 4 in Helsinki.
- April 8 – Gustav Mahler embarks from New York for France; he enters a clinic in Paris, where he dies just over a month later.
- May 19 – Maurice Ravel's opera L'heure espagnole is premiered at the Opéra-Comique in Paris, in a double bill with Jules Massenet's 1907 opera Thérèse.
- May 24 – Edward Elgar conducts the première of his Symphony No. 2 in London.
- June 13 – Igor Stravinsky's ballet Petrushka is premiered in Paris; the lead dancer is Vaslav Nijinsky.
- July – Frank Bridge completes his orchestral suite The Sea, while staying at Eastbourne.
- November 20 – Gustav Mahler's Das Lied von der Erde is premièred in Munich, after the composer's death, with his friend and former assistant Bruno Walter conducting at the request of Alma Mahler.
- November 26 - Nicholas Laucella's symphonic poem Consalvo is premiered under the direction of Josef Stránský.
- date unknown
  - Aino Ackté and other prominent opera singers found the Domestic Opera in Finland.
  - "Elsässisches Fahnenlied" is adopted as the anthem of the Republic of Alsace-Lorraine.
  - 16-year-old Carl Orff publishes his first compositions.
  - The Society of Women Musicians is co-founded by Marion Scott and others.

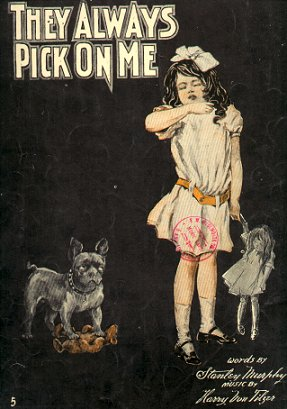

== Published popular music ==
- "After That I Want A Little More" w. Alfred Bryan m. Fred Fisher
- "After The Honeymoon" w.m. Irving Berlin
- "Alexander's Ragtime Band" w.m. Irving Berlin
- "All Alone" w. William Dillon m. Harry Von Tilzer
- "Any Old Iron" w.m. Charles Collins & Terry Sheppard
- "Baby Rose" by Louis Weslyn
- "Billy" w. Joe Goodwin m. James Kendis & Herman Paley
- "Bring Back My Lovin' Man" w.m. Irving Berlin
- "Can't You Take It Back And Change It For A Boy?" w.m. Thurland Chattaway
- "Core 'ngrato" w. Riccardo Cordiferro, m. Salvatore Cardillo
- "Down Home Rag" m. Wilbur Sweatman
- "Down The Field" w. Caleb O'Connor m. Stanleigh P. Friedman
- "El Choclo" w. Francice Luban m. Angel G. Villoldo
- "Everybody's Doing it Now" w.m. Irving Berlin
- "The Firebird" m. Igor Stravinsky
- "The Floral Dance" w.m. Katie Moss
- "The Gaby Glide" w. Harry Pilcer m. Louis Hirsch
- "Honey Love" w. Jack Drislane m. George W. Meyer
- "Honeysuckle Rag" m. George Botsford
- "I Want a Girl (Just Like the Girl That Married Dear Old Dad)" w. William Dillon m. Harry Von Tilzer
- "I Want To Be In Dixie" (also known as ""I'm Going Back To Dixie") w.m. Irving Berlin & Ted Snyder
- "If Every Hour Were A Day" w. Anna Driver m. Alfred Bryan
- "In The Land Of Harmony" w. Bert Kalmar m. Ted Snyder
- "Jimmy Valentine" w. Edward Madden m. Gus Edwards
- "The Little Grey Home In The West" w. D. Eardley-Wilmot m. Hermann Löhr
- "Make Me Love You Like I Never Loved Before" w. Alfred Bryan m. Fred Fisher
- "Mary O'Hoolihan" Berlin
- "(On) Moonlight Bay" w. Edward Madden m. Percy Wenrich
- "Movin' Man Don't Take My Baby Grand" w. Bert Kalmar m. Ted Snyder
- "My Beautiful Lady (Kiss Waltz)" w. C. M. S. McLellan m. Ivan Caryll
- "My Hula Hula Love" w. Edward Madden m. Percy Wenrich

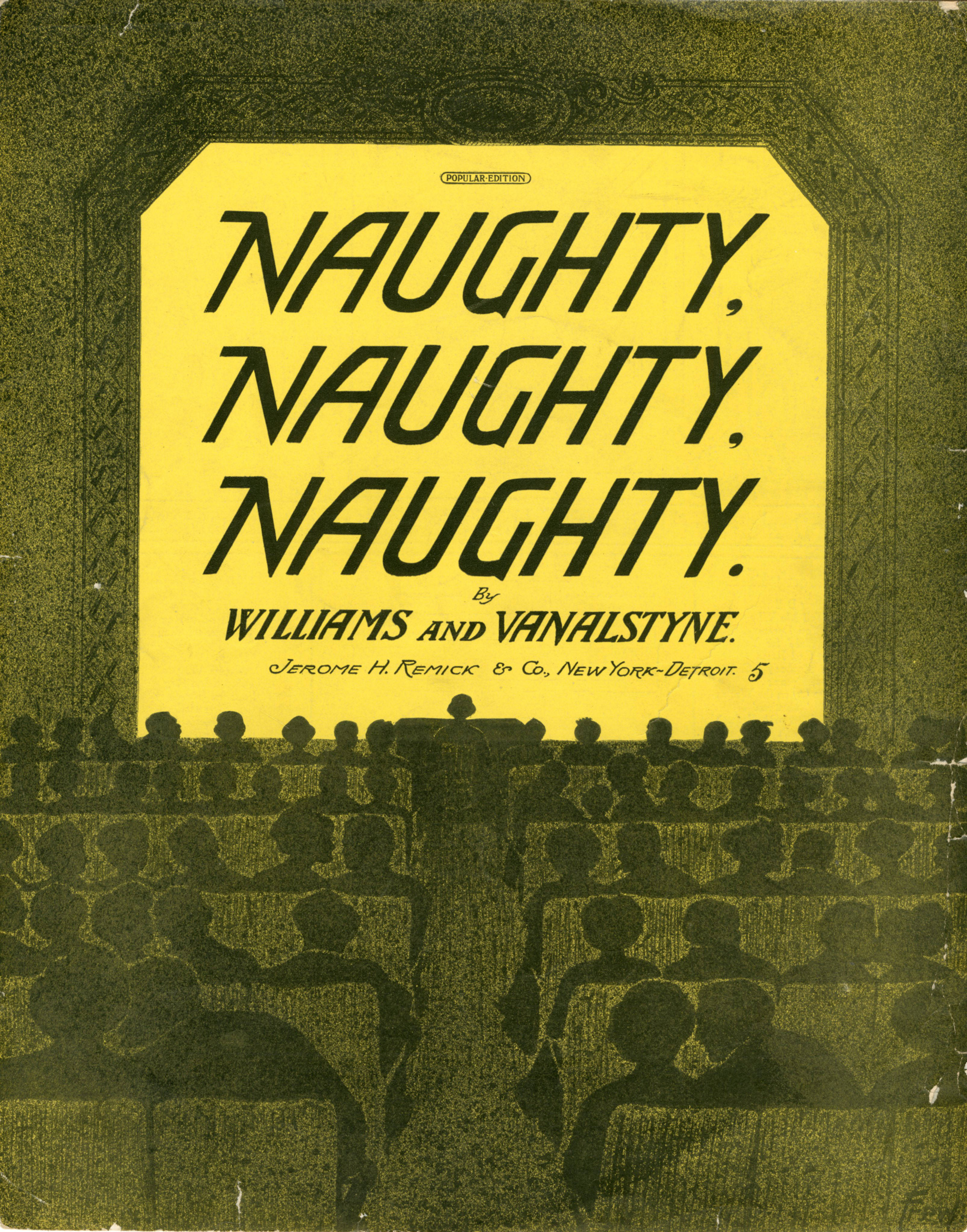
Cover of sheet music for Naughty, Naughty, Naughty

- "Naughty, Naughty, Naughty" w. Harry Williams m. Egbert Van Alstyne
- "The Oceana Roll" w. Roger Lewis m. Lucien Denni
- "Oh, You Beautiful Doll" w. A. Seymour Brown m. Nat D. Ayer
- "One O'Clock In The Morning I Get Lonesome" w.m. Irving Berlin
- "Ragtime Violin!" w.m. Irving Berlin
- "Red Rose Rag" w. Edward Madden m. Percy Wenrich
- "Roamin' In The Gloamin'" w.m. Harry Lauder
- "Run Home And Tell Your Mother" w.m. Irving Berlin
- "Sarnia Cherie" (anthem of Guernsey) w. George Deighton, m. Domenico Santangelo
- "Somewhere a Voice is Calling" w. Eileen Newton m. Arthur F. Tate
- "The Spaniard That Blighted My Life" w.m. Billy Merson
- "Spanish Love" Irving Berlin, Vincent Bryan, Ted Snyder
- "That Hypnotizing Man" w. Lew Brown m. Albert Von Tilzer
- "That Mysterious Rag" w.m. Irving Berlin, Ted Snyder
- "That Was Before I Met You" w. Alfred Bryan m. George W. Meyer
- "There's A Girl In Havana" Irving Berlin, E. Ray Goetz, A. Baldwin Sloane
- "They Always Pick On Me" by Harry Von Tilzer and Stanley Murphy
- "Till The Sands Of The Desert Grow Cold" w. George Graff Jr m. Ernest R. Ball
- "To The Land Of My Own Romance" w. Harry B. Smith m. Victor Herbert
- "Too Much Mustard" m. Cecil Macklin
- "Virginia Lou" Irving Berlin, Earl Taylor
- "A Wee Deoch-an-Doris" w.m. Gerald Grafton & Harry Lauder
- "When I Was Twenty-One And You Were Sweet Sixteen" w. Harry Williams m. Egbert Van Alstyne
- "When I'm Alone I'm Lonesome" w.m. Irving Berlin & Ted Snyder
- "When It Rains, Sweetheart, When It Rains" w.m. Irving Berlin
- "When Ragtime Rosie Ragged The Rosary" w. Edgar Leslie m. Lewis F. Muir
- "When You Kiss An Italian Girl" w.m. Irving Berlin
- "When You're Away" w. A. Seymour Brown & Joe Young m. Bert Grant
- "When You're In Town" w.m. Irving Berlin
- "The Whistling Rag" w.m. Irving Berlin
- "Woodman, Woodman, Spare That Tree" w.m. Irving Berlin & Vincent Bryan
- "Yiddisha Nightingale" w.m. Irving Berlin
- "You've Got Me Hypnotized" w.m. Irving Berlin

== Hit recordings ==
- "Any Little Girl, That's a Nice Little Girl, Is the Right Little Girl for Me" – Billy Murray
- "Let Me Call You Sweetheart" - the Peerless Quartet
- "Turn Off Your Light, Mr. Moon Man" – Nora Bayes and Jack Norworth

== Classical music ==
- Joseph Achron – Hebrew Melody
- Lili Boulanger – Les Sirènes
- Frank Bridge – The Sea
- George Butterworth – Two English Idylls
- George Whitefield Chadwick – Suite Symphonique
- Eric Coates – Miniature Suite
- Frederick Delius – Summer Night on the River
- George Enescu –
  - Sonata for violin and piano, in A minor (first-movement "Torso")
  - Suite châtelaine, for orchestra (unfinished)
- Carl Engel – Sea-Shell
- Reinhold Glière – Symphony No. 3 Ilya Murometz (completed)
- Enrique Granados – Goyescas
- Reynaldo Hahn – Aubade athénienne
- Gustav Holst
  - Invocation for Cello and Orchestra, Op. 19/2
  - Second Suite in F, for military band
  - 2 Eastern Pictures, H. 112
- Charles Ives – Requiem S. 333
- Paul von Klenau – String Quartet No. 1 in E minor
- Nikolai Medtner – Sonata for Piano in E minor, Op. 25 no 2 "Night Wind"
- Nikolai Myaskovsky
  - Sinfonietta in A
  - Symphony No. 2
  - Cello Sonata No. 1 (later revised in 1945).
- Carl Nielsen – Concerto for Violin and Orchestra
- Arnold Schoenberg – Sechs kleine Klavierstücke
- Alexander Scriabin
  - Piano Sonata No. 6
  - Piano Sonata No. 7
- Cyril Scott
  - An Old Song Ended
  - Water-Wagtail, Op.71 No.3
  - Tallahassee, Op.73 No.4
- Ethel Smyth – The March of the Women
- John Philip Sousa – Tales of a Traveler
- Charles Villiers Stanford
  - Symphony No. 7 in D minor, Op. 124
  - Piano Concerto No. 2 in C minor, Op. 126
- Igor Stravinsky
  - The Firebird Suite No. 1
  - Petrushka
  - Two Poems of K. Balmont, for voice and piano
- Amy Woodforde-Finden – "Stars of the Desert"

== Opera ==
- Béla Bartók – Bluebeard's Castle (first version composed; revised 1912 and 1917; not staged until 1918)
- Scott Joplin – Treemonisha (composed; not staged until 1972)
- Maurice Ravel – L'Heure Espagnole
- Richard Strauss – Der Rosenkavalier, Dresden

== Operetta ==
- Leányvásár (The Marriage Market) – Victor Jacobi

== Musical theater ==
- The Count of Luxembourg London production opened at Daly's Theatre on May 20 and ran for 340 performances
- The Fascinating Widow Broadway production opened at the Liberty Theatre on September 11 and transferred to the Grand Opera House on November 13 for a total run of 65 performances. Starring Julian Eltinge, Winona Winter, Natalia Ault and Eddie Garvie.
- Gypsy Love (Zigeunerliebe) opened in Berlin. The Broadway production opened at the Globe Theatre on October 17 and ran for 31 performances
- Der Lila Domino (Lilac Domino) – Leipzig production
- Madame Sherry New York
- Marriage a la Carte Broadway production opened at the Casino Theatre on January 2 and ran for 64 performances
- Peggy, by Leslie Stuart, with a book by George Grossmith, Jr. and lyrics by C. H. Bovill, London production opens at the Gaiety Theatre under the management of George Edwardes, on 4 March, and runs for 270 performances, starring Grossmith, Edmund Payne, Phyllis Dare and Gabrielle Ray
- The Pink Lady Broadway production opened at the New Amsterdam Theatre on March 13 and ran for 312 performances
- The Quaker Girl Broadway production opened at the Park Theatre on October 23 and ran for 240 performances
- The Revue of Revues Broadway revue opened at the Winter Garden Theatre on September 27 and ran for 55 performances. Starring Gaby Deslys, Harry Jolson, Ernie Hare and Frank Tinney.
- Die Sirene by Leo Fall, based on a text by Leo Stein and A. M. Willner, first performed in Vienna on 5 January.
- The Siren, a Broadway musical adaptation of Die Sirene is produced in New York by Charles Frohman and runs at the Knickerbocker Theatre from 28 August 1911 to 16 December (116 performances).

== Births ==
- January 10 – Sidney Griller, violinist and founder of the Griller Quartet (d. 1993)
- January 18
  - Gábor Darvas, composer (d. 1985)
  - Danny Kaye, actor, singer, dancer and comedian (d. 1987)
- January 20
  - Roy Eldridge, jazz trumpeter (d. 1989)
  - Wendell J. Westcott, American carillon player and educator (d. 2010)
- January 24
  - Evelyn Barbirolli, English oboist (d. 2008)
  - Muir Mathieson, Scottish conductor and composer (d. 1975)
- February 3 – Jehan Alain, French organist and composer (d. 1940)
- February 5 – Jussi Björling, Swedish tenor (d. 1960)
- February 10 – Victor Guillermo Ramos Rangel, Venezuelan classical musician (b. 1911)
- February 11 – Wesley Rose, American record producer (d. 1990)
- February 17 – Orrin Tucker, American saxophonist and bandleader (d. 2011)
- February 20 – Robert McBride, American composer (d. 2007)
- March 7 – Stefan Kisielewski, Polish composer (d. 1991)
- March 8 – Alan Hovhaness, composer (d. 2000)
- March 9 – Clara Rockmore, born Clara Reisenberg, thereminist and violinist (d. 1998)
- March 16 – Harper Goff, Disney special effects man and Dixieland musician (d. 1993)
- March 18 – Smiley Burnette, singer-songwriter (d. 1967)
- April 6 – Guillermo Portabales, singer-songwriter and guitarist (d. 1970)
- April 8 – Ichirō Fujiyama, Japanese composer and singer (d. 1993)
- May 8
  - Robert Johnson, American blues guitarist and singer (d. 1938)
  - Blanche Winogron, American harpsichordist (d. 2002)
- May 13 – Maxine Sullivan, American singer (d. 1987)
- May 14 – Hans Vogt, German composer and conductor (d. 1992)
- May 17 – André Jaunet, French-born Swiss flautist (d. 1988)
- May 18 – Big Joe Turner, American blues shouter (d. 1985)
- May 20 – Vet Boswell of the American Boswell Sisters singing group (d. 1988)
- June 4 – Faustino Oramas, Cuban singer, tres guitarist and composer (d. 2007)
- June 9 – Frederick May, Irish composer (d. 1985)
- June 24 – Portia White, contralto singer (d. 1968)
- June 29 – Bernard Herrmann, film composer (d. 1975)
- July 4 – Mitch Miller, arranger, conductor, record producer and oboe player (d. 2010)
- July 7 – Gian Carlo Menotti, composer (d. 2007)
- July 8 – Gertrude Niesen, American singer, actress, comedian and songwriter (d. 1975)
- July 16 – Ginger Rogers, dancer, actress and singer (d. 1995)
- July 26 – Buddy Clark, singer (d. 1949)
- July 29 – Ján Cikker, composer (d. 1989)
- July 31 – George Liberace, violinist and elder brother of Liberace (d. 1983)
- August 5 – Roger Roger, film composer and bandleader (d. 2007)
- August 6 – Lucille Ball, actress and singer (d. 1989)
- August 26 – Deva Dassy, French opera singer (d. 2016)
- August 27 – Kay Walsh, dancer and actress (d. 2005)
- September 2 – Floyd Council, blues musician (d. 1976)
- September 11 – Bola de Nieve, singer-songwriter and pianist (d. 1971)
- September 19 – Allan Pettersson, Swedish composer (d. 1980)
- September 24 – Marie Kraja, Albanian operatic and folk singer (d. 1999)
- October 1 – Irwin Kostal, arranger (d. 1994)
- October 7
  - Shura Cherkassky, pianist (d. 1995)
  - Vaughn Monroe, singer and bandleader (d. 1973)
- October 24 – Sonny Terry, blues musician (d. 1986)
- October 26 – Mahalia Jackson, gospel singer (d. 1972)
- October 29 – Nelson Cavaquinho, samba singer and composer (d. 1986)
- November 5 – Roy Rogers, American singer, actor (d. 1998)
- November 7 – John Garris, German tenor (d. 1949)
- November 24 – Erik Bergman, Finnish composer (d. 2006)
- November 30 – Jorge Negrete, Mexican singer and actor (d. 1953)
- December 3 – Nino Rota, composer (d. 1979)
- December 14 – Spike Jones, bandleader (d. 1965)
- December 15 – Stan Kenton, bandleader (d. 1979)
- December 17 – André Claveau, French singer and Eurovision winner (d. 2003)
- December 25 – Eric Gilder, musicologist (d. 2000)
- December 27 – Anna Russell, singer and comedian (d. 2006)
- December 28 – Max Jaffa, violinist and bandleader (d. 1991)

== Deaths ==
- January 7 – William Hall Sherwood, pianist and music educator (b. 1854)
- January 8 – Pietro Gori, anarchist poet and songwriter (b. 1865)
- January 9 – Edwin Arthur Jones, composer (b. 1853)
- January 16 – Wilhelm Berger, pianist, conductor and composer (born 1861)
- January 28 – Wilhelmina Fundin, Swedish operatic soprano (b. 1819)
- February 1 – Ángel Mislan, composer (b. 1862)
- February 20 – Alexander Kopylov, violinist and composer (b. 1854)
- March 20 – Jean-Théodore Radoux, bassoonist and composer (b. 1835)
- March 29 – Alexandre Guilmant, organist and composer (b. 1837)
- April 7 – Wilhelm Thern, pianist (b. 1847)
- April 10 – Mikalojus Konstantinas Čiurlionis, painter and composer (b. 1875)
- April 15 – Wilma Neruda, violinist (b. 1838)
- May 4 – Ronald Richardson Potter, organist and composer (b. 1879)
- May 5 – James A. Bland, musician and songwriter (b. 1854)
- May 18 – Gustav Mahler, composer (b. 1860)
- May 29 – W. S. Gilbert, of Gilbert & Sullivan (b. 1836)
- June 7 – Carlos Fernández Shaw, librettist (b. 1865)
- June 13 – Patrick Heeney, composer (b. 1881)
- June 14 – Johan Svendsen, conductor, composer and violinist (b. 1840)
- June 16 – Frank Peabody Atherton, composer and educator (b. 1868)
- June 18 – Franjo Kuhač, piano teacher, conductor and musicologist (b. 1834)
- June 21 – Robert Radecke, composer (b. 1830)
- June 22 – Bruno Klein, organist and composer (b. 1858)
- July 2 – Felix Mottl, conductor and composer (b. 1856)
- July 3 – Madeline Schiller, pianist (b. c. 1845)
- July 7 – Samuel de Lange, composer, organist, pianist, conductor and music teacher, director of the Stuttgart music conservatory (b. 1841)
- July 25 – Filippo Capocci, Italian organist and composer (b. 1840)
- August 2
  - Bob Cole, composer (b. 1869)
  - José Joaquín Palma, lyricist of the national anthem of Guatemala (b. 1884)
- August 10 – Carl Christian Lumbye, Danish composer, son of Hans Christian Lumbye
- August 29 – Hildegard Werner, Swedish musician, conductor and journalist (b. 1834)
- October 3 – Paul Sarebresole, ragtime composer (b. 1875)
- October 13 – Harry Rickards, comedian, singer and theatre owner (b. 1843)
- November 23 – Catalina Berroa, Cuban pianist, music teacher and composer (b. 1849)
- December 29 – Rosamund Marriott Watson, lyricist (born 1860)
