= Bothwell Browne =

American actor

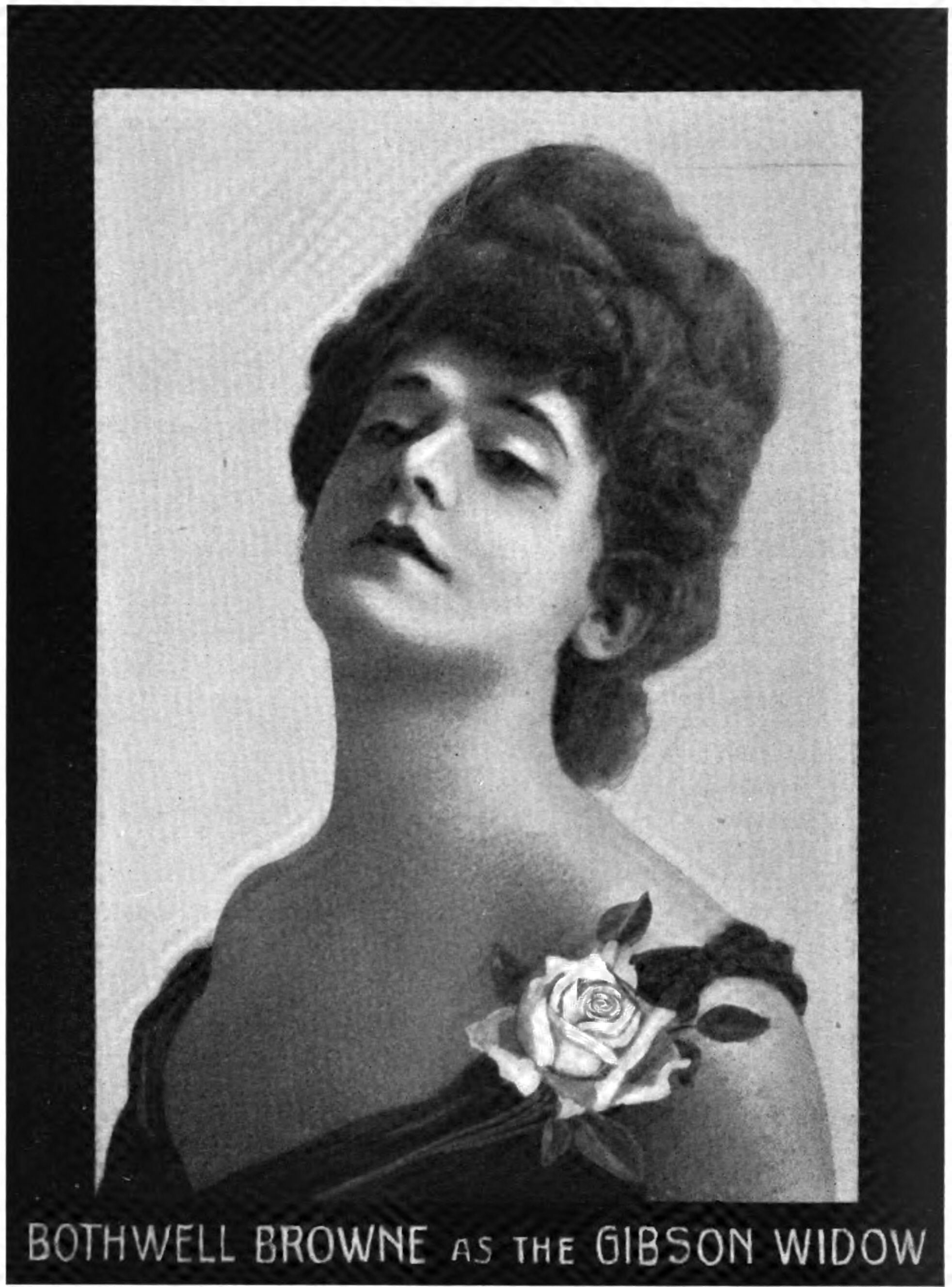
Bothwell Browne in 1908

Bothwell Browne (born Walter Bothwell Bruhn) (March 7, 1877 – December 12, 1947) was a Danish-American stage and film performer, best known as a female impersonator.

== Early life ==
Born in Copenhagen, Denmark, Browne grew up in San Francisco. and developed a vaudeville act. At one point he was performing as a duo with male impersonator Kathleen Clifford.

Around 1900 he began performing with the Cohan and Harris Minstrels, and in 1908 made his New York debut in Winning the Gibson Girl, playing the title role, impersonating a Gibson Girl.

== Stage productions ==
In 1910, Browne enjoyed a major stage success with The Pantaloon Girl, in which he offered five different impersonations.

Deliberately or not, Browne competed with the better-known female impersonator Julian Eltinge, who had pioneered the art form in early cinema. Some audiences and theater managers found Browne's interpretations more seductive and therefore more unsettling than Eltinge. Browne's Broadway production Miss Jack opened in September 1911 at the Herald Square Theater, exactly one week before Eltinge's more successful The Fascinating Widow. Miss Jack was a disappointment, and closed after just sixteen performances.

== Film appearance ==
Browne's one and only film appearance is the 1919 Mack Sennett production Yankee Doodle in Berlin, Sennett's highest-budget film up to that point, and a bit of World War I propaganda. This release was parallel to Eltinge's anti-German film Over the Rhine (re-cut into The Isle of Love three years later).

Browne appears in the role of American World War I combat pilot Captain Bob White who crosses, and cross-dresses, into enemy German lines, managing to wreak havoc among the enemy military high command. The film was promoted in touring road shows that included members of Sennett’s bathing beauties and cast members, including Browne.

In December of the same year, Browne appeared as the headliner at the Palace Theater in New York, the single most sought-after booking in American vaudeville. supported on stage by the Sennett Bathing Beauties. This appears to be the pinnacle of his career. He thereafter retired to teach dancing classes and produce night-club acts in San Francisco.

Bothwell Browne died in Los Angeles on December 12, 1947, age 70.

== See also ==
- Julian Eltinge
- Bert Savoy
- Karyl Norman
