= Yankee Doodle (disambiguation) =

"Yankee Doodle" is a well-known Anglo-American song and the state anthem of Connecticut.

Yankee Doodle may also refer to:

== Cinema and television ==
- Yankee Doodle in Berlin, a 1919 silent film
- Yankee Doodle Dandy, a 1942 American biographical musical film about George M. Cohan
- Yankee Doodle Doctor, a M*A*S*H television episode

=== Cartoons ===
- The Yankee Doodle Mouse, a 1943 Tom and Jerry cartoon
- Yankee Doodle Bugs, a 1954 Bugs Bunny cartoon
- Yankee Doodle Daffy, a 1943 Daffy Duck cartoon
- Yankee Doodle Pigeon, also known as Dastardly and Muttley in Their Flying Machines, a Hanna-Barbera Productions cartoon

== Food ==
- Yankee Doodles, a chocolate cupcake snack sold in the United States
- Yankee Doodle Coffee Shop, a diner in New Haven, Connecticut

== Music ==
- "Dixie Doodle", a parody of "Yankee Doodle", written in 1862
- "The Yankee Doodle Boy", a song from the 1942 film

== Places ==
- Billerica, the official "Yankee Doodle Town"

== Other ==
- Yankee Doodle (NX4769), a Lockheed Vega aircraft that set North American transcontinental speed records in 1927 and 1928
