= 1819 in music =

This is a list of music-related events in 1819.

== Events ==
- February 23 - Johann Nepomuk Hummel is appointed Kapellmeister to the Weimar court, where he would remain for the rest of his life.
- Breitkopf & Härtel publishes piano music by Maria Szymanowska.
- Christoph Ernst Friedrich Weyse is appointed composer to the court of Denmark.
- Franz Liszt plays for Carl Czerny for the first time. The latter is impressed and agrees to take him on as a pupil.

== Popular music ==
- "Hot Codlins" sung by Joseph Grimaldi in Talking Bird, or Harlequin Perizade

== Classical music ==
- Hector Berlioz – La Dépit de la bergère, H 7
- João Domingos Bomtempo – Requiem in C Minor
- Muzio Clementi – The publication of Gradus ad Parnassum Volume II is entered at Stationer's Hall, London on April 16.
- Louis-Francois Dauprat – 3 Mélodies, Op. 25
- Friedrich Ernst Fesca – String Quartet, Op. 12
- Johann Nepomuk Hummel
  - Piano Sonata No.5, Op. 81
  - Piano Trio in E major, Op. 83
- Friedrich Kuhlau – 8 Variations on a Danish Song, Op. 16
- Ignaz Moscheles – Grande Sonate, Op. 47
- George Onslow – Violin Sonata No.4, Op. 15
- Anton Reicha – Andante for Wind Quintet no 2 in F major
- Andreas Romberg – Sinfonia alla turca, Op. 51
- Franz Schubert – Trout Quintet
- Maria Szymanowska
  - Caprice sur la romance de Joconde
  - Grande valse
  - 6 Minuets
  - Polonaise sur l'air national favori du feu Prince Joseph Poniatowsky
- Carl Maria von Weber
  - Rondo brillante, Op. 62
  - Polacca brillante, Op. 72

== Opera ==
- Saverio Mercadante – L'Apoteosi d'Ercole
- Giovanni Pacini
  - Il falegname di Livonia
  - La sposa fedele
- Andreas Romberg – Die Großmut des Scipio
- Gioachino Rossini
  - Bianca e Falliero
  - La donna del lago
  - Eduardo e Cristina
  - Ermione

== Births ==
- January 12 – Giovanni Guicciardi, Italian opera singer (d. 1883)
- January 18 – Henriette Nissen-Saloman, opera singer (d. 1879)
- February 11 – Samuel Parkman Tuckerman, composer (d. 1890)
- February 24 – Emilia Uggla, pianist (d. 1855)
- 13 March – Henriette Wienecke, composer (d. 1907)
- April 4 – Lucile Grahn, ballerina (d. 1907)
- April 7 – Hubert Léonard, composer and musician (died 1890)
- April 11 – Sir Charles Hallé, pianist and conductor (d. 1895)
- April 18 – Franz von Suppé, composer (d. 1895)
- May 3 – Nicola De Giosa, Italian composer (died 1885)
- May 5
  - Achille De Bassini, operatic baritone (d. 1881)
  - Stanisław Moniuszko, composer, conductor and teacher (d. 1872)
- May 13 – Henry Farmer, British composer (died 1891)
- June 12 – Wilhelmina Fundin, Swedish operatic soprano (d. 1911)
- June 20 – Jacques Offenbach, composer (d. 1880)
- July 3 – Théodore Gouvy, composer (d. 1898)
- July 26 – Justin Holland, classical guitarist and civil rights activist (d. 1887)
- September 13 – Clara Schumann, pianist, composer (d. 1896)
- September 15 – Jules Étienne Pasdeloup, composer and conductor (died 1887)
- October 20 – Carl Mikuli, pianist, conductor, composer (d. 1897)
- October 23 – Isaac Baker Woodbury, music collector and composer (died 1858)
- date unknown – Ebba d'Aubert, Swedish pianist (d. 1860)

== Deaths ==
- March 9 – János Fusz, composer (b. 1777)
- April 29 – Louis-Augustin Richer, classical singer, singing master and composer (b. 1740)
- May 16 – Micaela Villegas, Peruvian entertainer (b. 1748)
- June 20 – Maria Anna Braunhofer, operatic soprano (b. 1748)
- June 21 – Georg Druschetzky, composer (b. 1745)
- June 30 – Ernst Ludwig Gerber, composer and compiler of a dictionary of musicians (b. 1746)
- September 7 – Jean-Louis Duport, cellist (b. 1749)
- December 29 – Josepha Weber, operatic soprano (b. 1758)
- date unknown – Anant Fandi, Marathi Shahir poet-singer (b. 1744)
