= Belle Adair (actress) =

American actress

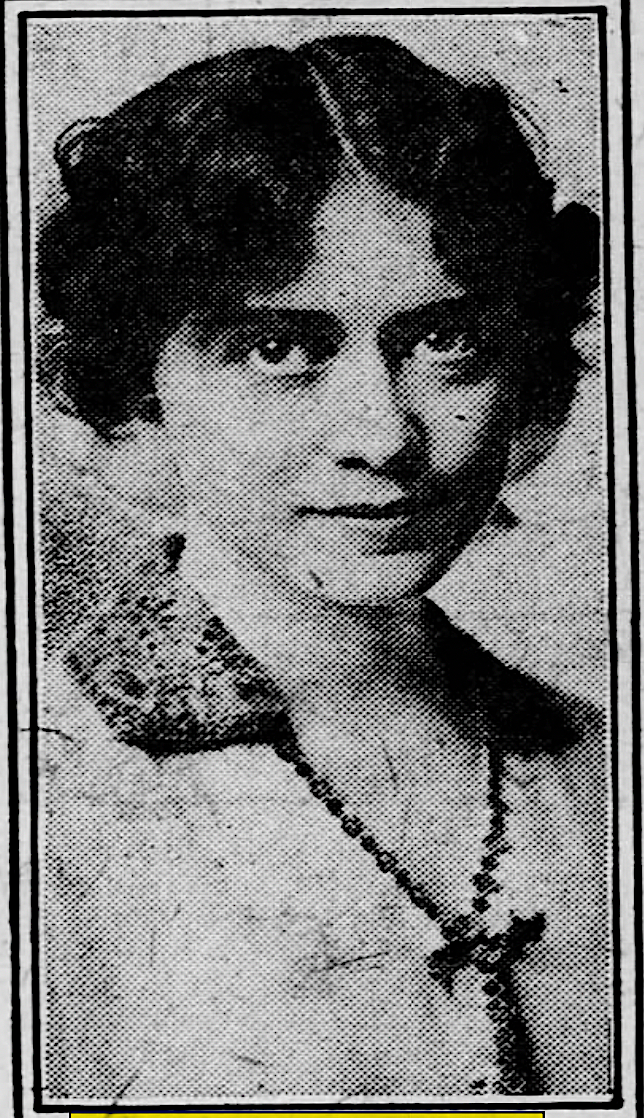
- 1913
- Born: Eleanore Palmer; July 27, 1889; Keyport, New Jersey
- Died: March 3, 1971; South Orange, New Jersey

Eleanor A. Palmer (July 27, 1889 (Note: IMDb and other sources have erroneously given her date of birth as February 7, 1889 in Wallingford, Vermont. This Belle Adair was a different woman active as a school teacher in Vermont and New York City at the same time that Belle Adair was performing in vaudeville across North America. Newspaper records in newspaper.com for Vermont, New York, California, and elsewhere in the 1910s show they were in different places doing different things at the same time, and they are therefore not the same person. The actress stated in interviews that Belle Adair was not her real name. Newspapers report her real name was Eleanore Palmer, and her married name Eleanor Baar.) – March 3, 1971) was an American actress and singer who performed under the stage name Belle Adair. She performed on stage and in vaudeville in the 1910s. On screen she was active with the Eclair film company of New York City with whom she made silent films in 1914. After 1914, she was also known by her married name, Eleanor A. Baar.

== Biography ==
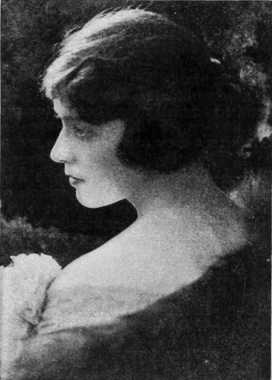
Belle Adair, 1914

The daughter of Mrs. Nellie Palmer, née Galligan, Eleanor A. Palmer was born in Keyport, New Jersey, on July 27, 1889. (Note: A ship's passenger manifest from 1929 gives her exact date of birth as 27 July 1889 in Keyport, New Jersey. According to journalist and academic Eugene Michael Vazzana, "Adair, Belle" was born in New York City (?) in 1890 (?). However, this does not match her exact age in her obituary nor the exact location of her birth. In a 1912 interview in The San Francisco Examiner, the actress stated that she was born in San Jose, California and moved from there at age 4. She also stated that she assumed the pseudonym Belle Adair at the behest of her manager, Mr. Casey, and it was not her real name. Back stories for actors were often fabricated in that era, so the location of her birth from this statement should be viewed in that light. A 1911 interview stated she was 18 when she began performing in 1910 and was currently 19 years old. Her obituary states she was 80 years old when she died in 1971.) In a 1912 interview in the Harrisburg Daily Independent, Adair stated that she was educated at Immaculate Heart convent in Locust Gap, Pennsylvania, and that she made her professional debut performing in vaudeville at Poli's Theatre in Hartford, Connecticut. Prior to this she had appeared in an amateur performance given on the USS Granite State boat on which her brother served. She appeared at Poli's in October 1910 and was a billed as a "singing comedienne". The Meriden Daily Journal review stated she had "a voice rivaling Blanche Ring or Maud Raymond".

She continued to perform as a singing comedienne at a variety of vaudeville theaters in the United States and Canada; among them the Garrick Theatre in Wilmington, Delaware (1910), Shea's Theatre in Buffalo, New York, Poli's Theatre in Scranton, Pennsylvania (1910), Poli's Theatre in Springfield, Massachusetts (1911), the Trent Theatre in Trenton, New Jersey (1911), the Grand Theatre in Hamilton, Ontario (1911), the Orpheum Theatre in Montreal (1911), the Dominion Theatre in Ottawa, the Majestic Theatre in Chicago (1911), the Majestic Theatre in Milwaukee, Wisconsin, the Orpheum Theatre in San Francisco (1911), the Orpheum Theatre in Los Angeles (1911), the Orpheum Theatre in Salt Lake City (1911), the Orpheum Theater in Madison, Wisconsin (1911), the Orpheum Theatre in Harrisburg, Pennsylvania (1912). the Forsyth Theatre in Atlanta, Georgia (1912), the Colonial Theater in Norfolk, Virginia (1912), Young's Ocean Pier Theatre in Atlantic City, New Jersey (1912), the Temple Theater in Rochester, New York (1912), Keith's Theatre's in Boston (1912), and the Fifth Avenue Theatre in New York City (1912).

In the 1912–1913 season, Adair toured as the lead female role of Margaret Leffingwell in Otto Harbach's musical The Fascinating Widow which co-starred drag artist Julian Eltinge and was produced by A. H. Woods. The tour began in Wisconsin and then played in theaters in Montana, British Columbia, Washington state, Oregon, California, Texas, Louisiana, Tennessee, Washington D.C. (Columbia Theatre), Pennsylvania, Maryland, Michigan, Missouri, and New York. After the closing of this show she resumed touring in vaudeville in May 1913.

By January 1914 Adair was under contract with the Eclair film company of New York City. Universal Pictures distributed several silent films she made with Eclair in 1914; including Adventures in Diplomacy, At the Court of Prince Make Believe, Boy, The Case of Cherry Purcelle, The Character Woman, Coming Home, Cue and Mis-Cue, The Diamond Master, The Drug Traffic (1914), The Duty, For the Mastery of the World, The Good in the Worst of Us, The Greatest of These, Man of the Hour, Moonlight, Mother, Son, and Wife.

== Later life ==
Eleanor married Rudolph Frederick Baar on October 10, 1914. They had one son and two daughters together. Her obituary claims she was still active in vaudeville during the 1920s. (Note: Newspaper accounts of her performances in vaudeville stop in 1914 when she took up film work. Newspapers.com does not have any coverage of performances in vaudeville after 1914. Her film and stage performance career likely stopped after her marriage.)

Eleanor Baar died in South Orange, New Jersey, on March 3, 1971, at the age of 80.
