= Yankee Doodle in Berlin =

1919 film by F. Richard Jones

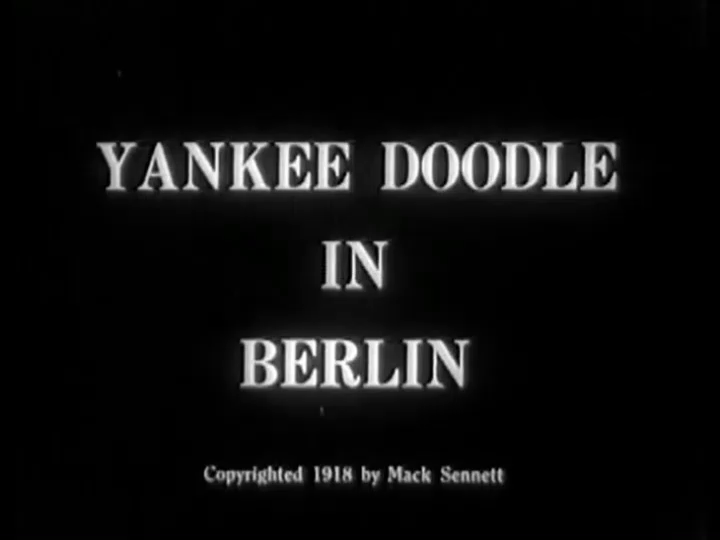
- Title card
- Directed by: F. Richard Jones
- Written by: Mack Sennett (story)
- Produced by: Mack Sennett
- Starring: Bothwell Browne
- Cinematography: Fred Jackman; J.R. Lockwood
- Production company: Mack Sennett Comedies
- Distributed by: Sol Lesser on State's Rights basis
- Release date: March 2, 1919; (Tivoli Theatre)
- Running time: 5 reels
- Country: United States
- Language: Silent (English intertitles)
- Box office: $125,000

The full film

Yankee Doodle in Berlin is a 1919 American silent comedy and World War I film from producer Mack Sennett. A five-reel feature, it was Sennett's most expensive production up to that time. Hiram Abrams was the original State's Rights marketer before the film's release, but producer Sol Lesser bought the rights in March 1919.

Bothwell Browne was a famous cross-dresser from Northern Europe. At the time this movie was produced he was the European rival of famous American cross-dresser Julian Eltinge, who starred in very similar plotted World War I propaganda film The Isle of Love (original title Over the Rhine).

The film was later condensed for re-release and titled The Kaiser's Last Squeal.

== Plot ==
Captain Bob White is an American pilot who is assigned to infiltrate the Kaiser's palace and radio German secrets back to the allies. White has a secret weapon though; he is also a female impersonator, and uses his feminine charm to create a barrier between the Kaiser, his Crown Prince and Von Hindenburg.

Meanwhile, Bob is also romancing a young Belgian girl, who is his accomplice. Bob finally gets the message out about the Kaiser's plans, and the invasion commences.

== Cast ==
- Bothwell Browne as Captain Bob White
- Ford Sterling as The Kaiser
- Malcolm St. Clair as The Crown Prince
- Bert Roach as Field Marshal Von Hindenburg
- Charles Murray as Irish Soldier
- Marie Prevost as Belgian Girl
- Chester Conklin as Officer of Death's Head Hussars
- Heinie Conklin as Prussian Guard Drill Leader
- Eva Thatcher as The Kaiserini
- Joseph Belmont as Von Tirpitz
- Phyllis Haver as Minor Role (uncredited)
- James Finlayson as Commander's Officer (uncredited)

== Background and production ==
The movie was filmed in November and December of 1918, and has been characterized as a lampoon of the "Hate the Hun propaganda films of the World War I years." Sennett described the film as a "satire of German militarism."

== Release ==
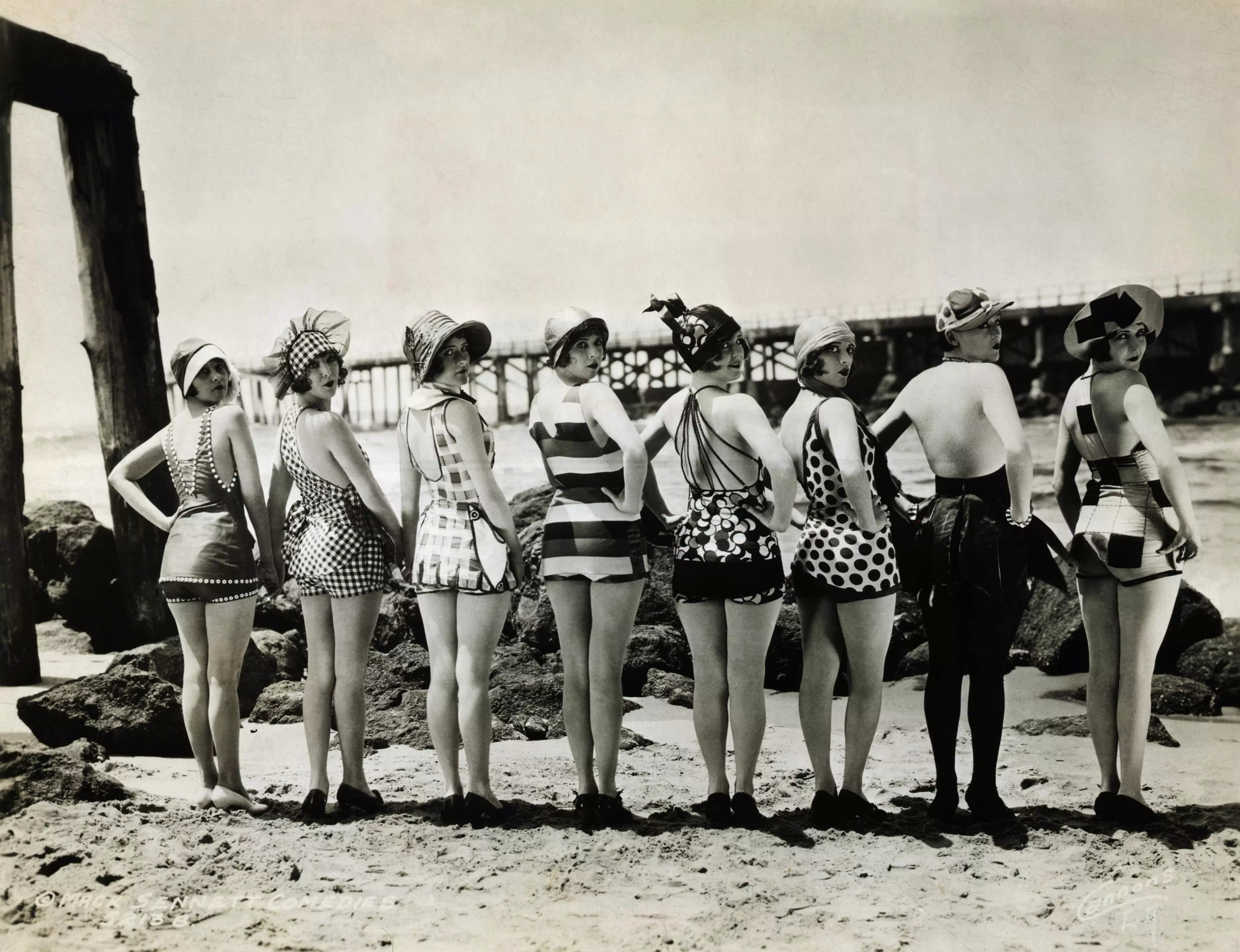
Mack Sennet Bathing Beauties

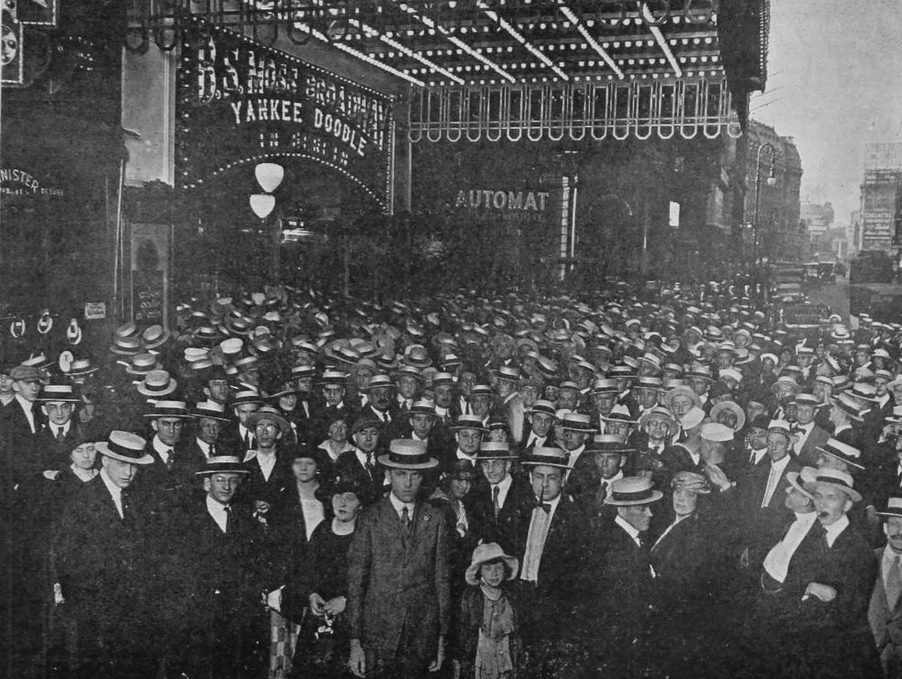
Crowd at Broadway Theatre waiting to get in to see the film

Movie distributor Lesser released the picture in tandem with the Sennett Bathing Beauties in a short film titled, Why Beaches Are Popular. The short was paired with the film to introduce some of the characters, and was composed of a number of unrelated comic skits. The film ended up grossing approximately $125,000 at the box office.

The film had its premiere on March 2, 1919, at the Tivoli Theatre in San Francisco. After the picture was shown during its run at the Tivoli, Browne appeared in person on stage and did some of the dances he performed in the picture, with assistance from the Sennett Beauties. The film premiered on March 30, 1919, at the Kinema Theatre in Los Angeles.

During its run at the Broadway Theatre in New York, there were several promotions planned to advertise the film. One of those involved the prearranged arrest of the Sennett Beauties, which backfired, and resulted in the actual arrest of the girls, who were taken into custody and held for three hours before being released. Another publicity stunt was to have two of the girls fly over New York City in a Curtiss Aeroplane piloted by Walter Hinton, where they dropped 150,000 mininature photos of the girls over Times Square. According to the Motion Picture News, admission at the Broadway Theatre was at a "$1.00 top price and the film played to record houses for eight solid weeks."

=== Preservation status ===
The film is preserved by the Library of Congress. Copies also held by Museum of Modern Art, British Film Institute Film and Television, Cinematheque Royale de Belgique, Academy Film Archive Beverly Hills.

== Reception ==
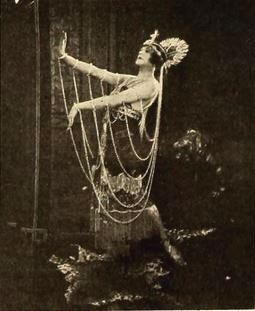
Bothwell Browne performing in drag in the film

Author Brent Walker wrote "the film has its share of laughs, mostly from its ensemble collection of Sennett scene-stealers, but it's not particularly outstanding or up to the standards of Sennett's two-reelers of the period." He complimented Sterling for being "at his hammy best, with St. Clair and Roach effective as the rivals."

Film historian Hal Erickson commented that "while Browne's cross-dressing mimicry is impressive, one can't help observing that he is far more attractive as a man than a woman." He also opined that the "most memorable performance comes from the literally immense Eva Thatcher; she proves beyond doubt that the film, for all its 'topicality', is at base an old-style domestic farce."

Author Paul Edwards stated "this very odd film relies totally on the slapstick nature of the comedy; as in all his work, Sennett had the tendency to rely on obvious slapstick rather than the more inspired sight gags." Variety Magazine wrote "the scenes showing the rivalry between the Kaiser, Crown Prince and Hindy to win the affection of the female impersonator are sure fire; the captions and titles are humorous, clever, and good for many laughs."

The Los Angeles Evening Post-Record commented that the film is "triumphant, it permits the brows to bend in thought when the laughter and fun are all over; like most of Senett's comedy, there is a 'motif', a plan and a purpose, but in none of his products has there been such a definite message as is found in this story of Yankee heroism and pluck versus Prussian bluff and innate cowardice, for the picture shows what everybody knows, that cruelty is the weapon of the coward." The Philadelphia Inquirer stated "it is an amusing satire on German official life, with comedy as the keynote throughout."

== See also ==
- Cross-dressing in film
- Mack Sennett filmography
- List of American films of 1918
- List of LGBTQ-related films pre-1920
