= Piano Sonata No. 3 (Chopin) =

1845 piano sonata in four movements composed by Frédéric Chopin

Piano Sonata No.3
- by Frédéric Chopin
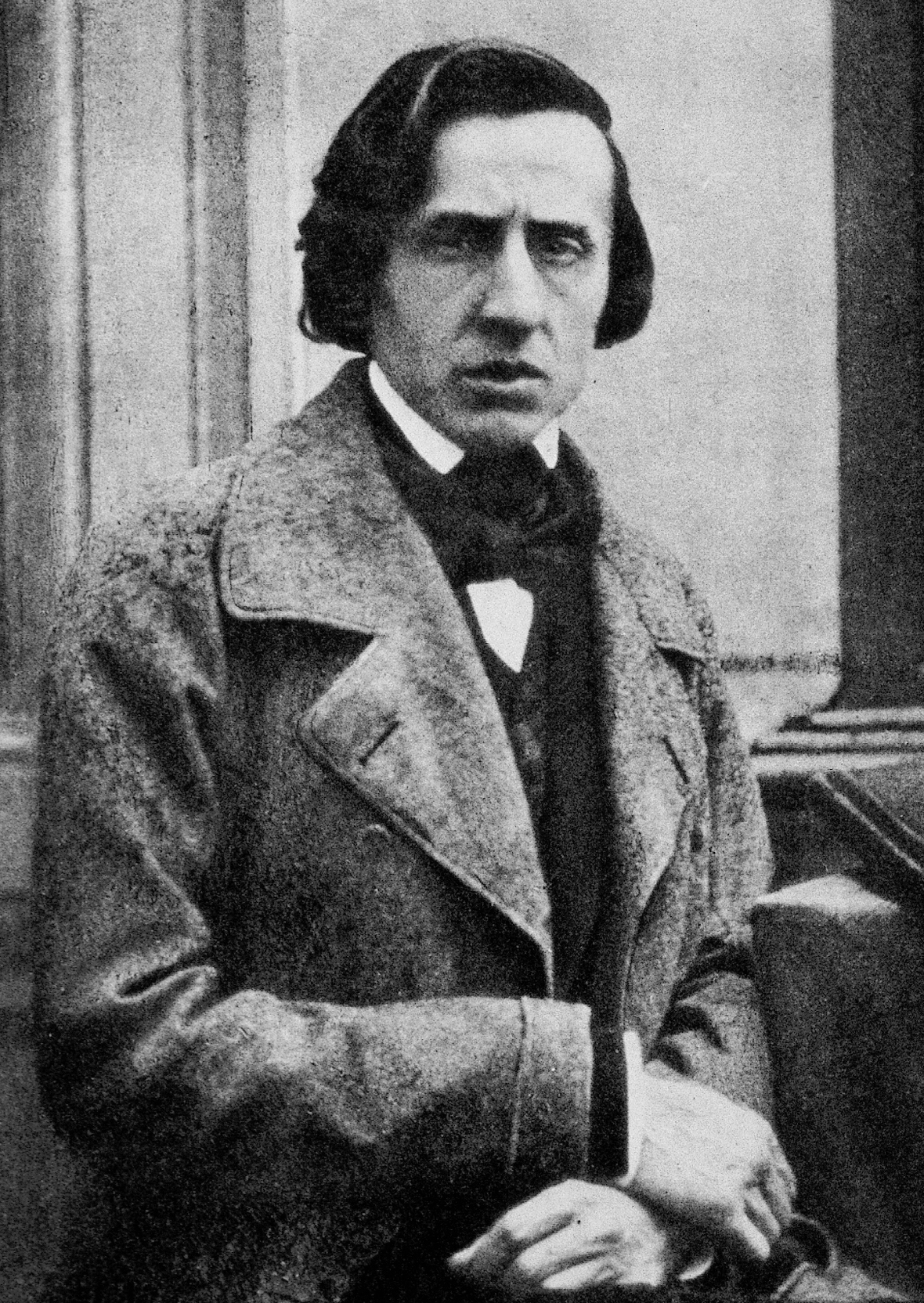
- Chopin daguerreotype, c. 1849
- Key: B minor
- Opus: 58
- Form: Piano sonata
- Composed: 1844
- Published: 1845
- Duration: About 23-30 minutes
- Movements: Four

The Piano Sonata No. 3 in B minor, Op. 58, is a piano sonata in four movements composed by Polish composer Frédéric Chopin; it is the second of the composer's three mature sonatas (the others being the Piano Sonata No. 2, Op. 35, and the Sonata for Piano and Cello in G minor, Op. 65). Completed in 1844 and published in 1845, the work is considered to be one of Chopin's most difficult compositions, both technically and musically. The work has a structure similar to Piano Sonata No. 5, Op. 81 by Johann Nepomuk Hummel.

A performance of the sonata lasts around 23 to 30 minutes, depending on whether the repetition of the exposition in the first movement is observed. The work is dedicated to Countess Élise de Perthuis.

== Analysis ==
The sonata consists of four movements, a similar structure to the second sonata, with a lyrical largo rather than a funeral march. Unlike the composer's first and second sonatas, the work ends in a major key.

1. Allegro maestoso (B minor → B major)
2. Scherzo: Molto vivace (E♭ major → B major → E♭ major)
3. Largo (B major → E major → B major)
4. Finale: Presto non tanto (B minor → B major)

=== I. Allegro maestoso ===
9–13 minutes (Note: 9 minutes without repeating the exposition, 13 minutes if the repetition is observed.)

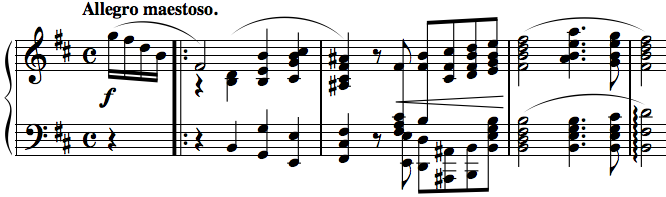
Opening of the Piano Sonata No. 3

The first movement, marked Allegro maestoso, is in a modified sonata form in B minor and 4/4 time. It starts with a downward arching phrase marked f (forte) followed by a sequence of chords to establish the tonic key of B minor. The transition section offers various variants of the basic motive, from a march in B♭ major to the combination of three thematic layers at the end of the transition section.

It is then followed by the second theme in the relative major, D major. The melody from the second theme, placed over an Alberti bass pattern, bears a resemblance to Chopin's Nocturne Op.27 No. 2. The second theme is found in the transition section in bars 23–24, where it is treated as a canon between the soprano and contralto voices. This exposition is quite long compared to other sonatas, and it may be for this reason many pianists choose to omit the repetition. Motives from the principal theme emerge in the development and is developed extensively through the use of counterpoint. Only a small section of the second theme appears in the development, so that the second theme can later be used to begin the recapitulation. This leads to the omission of the principal theme in the recapitulation, leaving only the second theme in B major to end the movement.

=== II. Scherzo ===
2–3 minutes

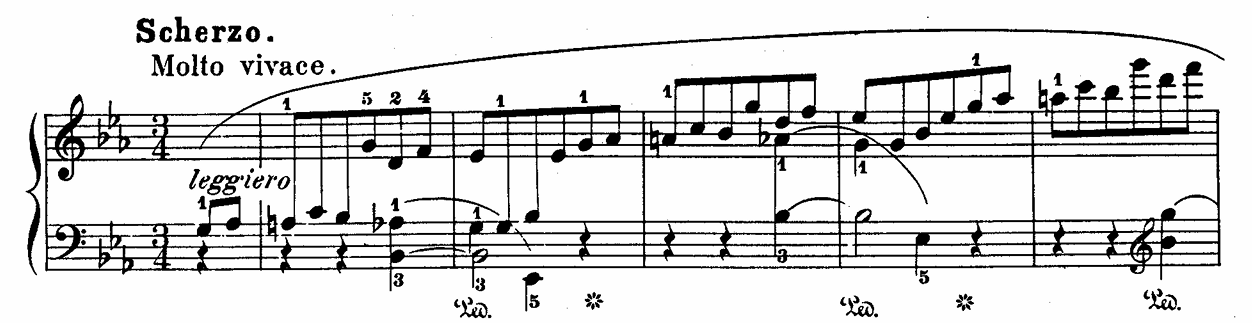
Opening of the Scherzo

Similar to the second piano sonata, the second movement is a scherzo marked Molto vivace, in E♭ major and 3/4 time. The movement opens with a "light-fingered moto perpetuo", characterised by continuous quaver runs in the right hand and minimal accompaniment before "pivoting" to the trio in B major. The trio consists of a more tranquil tune over a swinging accompaniment, reminiscent of Chopin's Scherzo No. 4, Op. 54.

Unlike the scherzo of the B♭ minor sonata and other pieces by Chopin with the title, it is exceptionally short, typically lasting barely three minutes in performance and serves as a brief interlude for the entire piece.

=== III. Largo ===
8–9 minutes

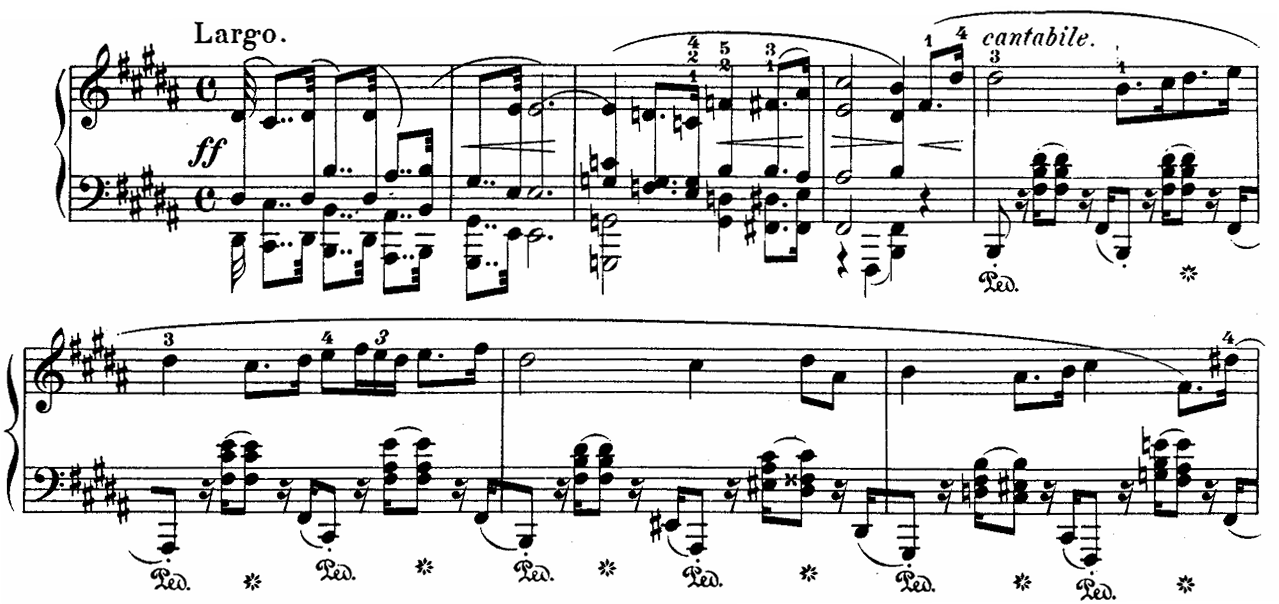
Opening of the Largo

The third movement is in ternary form, written in B major and 4/4 time. The Largo opens with a four-bar transition from the E♭ major of the scherzo to the key of the movement: B major. Despite a thunderous introduction in dotted rhythm, the Largo is serene, almost nocturne-like. Slow melody in duple metre and dotted rhythms give this movement the characteristics of a funeral march, without the expression of one. Charles Rosen noted that the movement is a tribute to the Italian stage – specifically Bellini.

Following the first theme is the trio in the subdominant key E major, with the right hand creating a three-voice structure through the use of arpeggiated figures. It lasts almost three times as long as the first part and nearly four times as long as the reprise. The texture of the main theme and the middle section are combined for the coda of the movement.

=== IV. Finale: Presto, non tanto ===
4–5 minutes

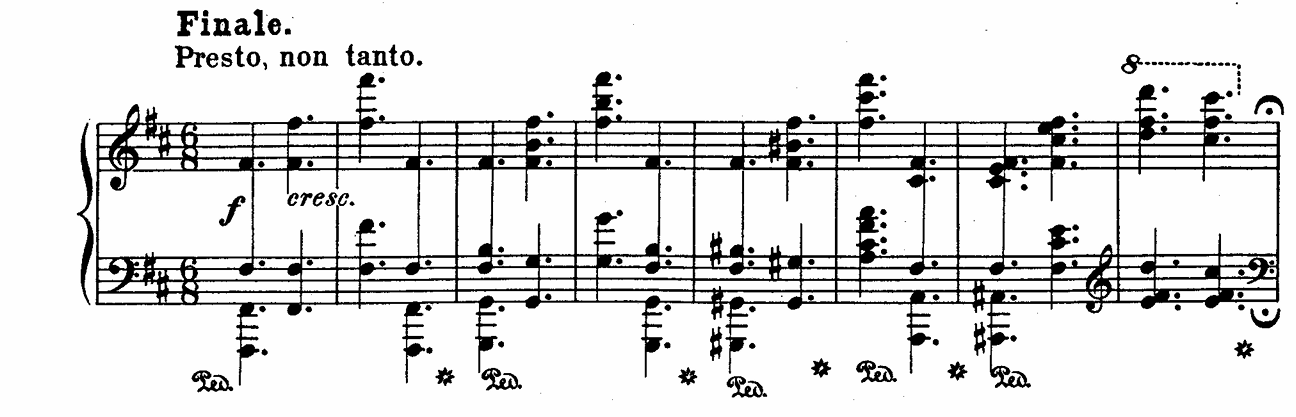
Introduction to the Finale

The finale is a sonata-rondo, marked Presto, non tanto, (Note: “Very fast, but not too much”.) in B minor and 6/8 time. It opens with eight bars of a vigorous introduction, followed by a dramatic pause on a high dominant pedal point, and then the first subject, marked agitato, enters. The first subject is based on the rising semitone from the introduction above, and appears three times in the movement. For the first time, it is accompanied by triplets in the bass.

Following that is a transition passage in B major, which is a blend of the “codetta” theme of the first movement and the “trio” theme of the second movement, which then leads to the second subject in F♯ major, After that, the first subject appears again in the key of E minor and the melody is accompanied by four quavers on the left hand in a three against four polyrhythm. The transition and the second subject that follows is in E♭ major. The first subject then returns for the third time in the key of B minor and the melody is accompanied by groups of six semiquavers. The movement, and subsequently the work, ends with a thrilling coda in B major.

George Charles Ashton Jonson believed that the strength required to play this movement is likely the reason that made Professor Hans Schmidt of the Vienna Conservatoire consider the Piano Sonata No. 3 as Chopin’s most technically difficult piece.

== Recordings ==
The Piano Sonata No. 3 has been recorded by numerous pianists. The first commercial electric recording was made by Percy Grainger in 1925. This has been described as "still one of the greatest accounts on disc ... The finale is simply dazzling". Other notable recordings include those by Leif Ove Andsnes, Vladimir Ashkenazy, Daniel Barenboim, Alfred Cortot, Vlado Perlemuter, Robert Casadesus, Janina Fialkowska, Evgeny Kissin, Arthur Rubinstein, Idil Biret, Abbey Simon, Marc-André Hamelin, Dinu Lipatti, Murray Perahia, Mitsuko Uchida, Cecile Ousset, Alexei Sultanov, Van Cliburn, and William Kapell as well as Chopin International Piano Competition winners Martha Argerich, Rafał Blechacz, Yundi Li, Garrick Ohlsson and Maurizio Pollini.
