= Virginia Rappe =

Silent film actress and model (1891–1921)

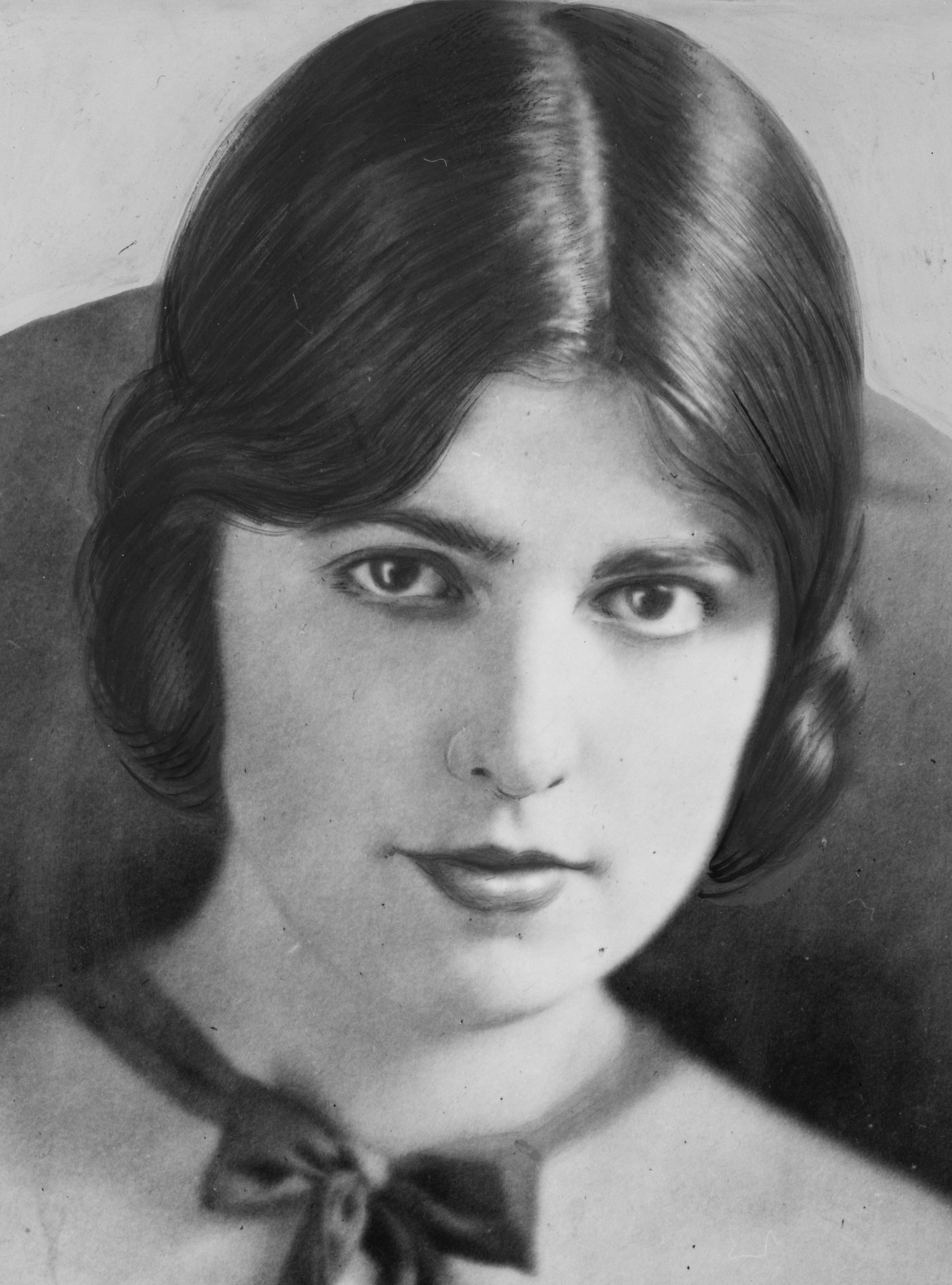
- Rappe, c. 1920
- Born: Zelliene Virginia Rappe; July 7, 1891; Chicago, Illinois, U.S.
- Died: September 9, 1921 (aged 30); San Francisco, California, U.S.
- Cause of death: Ruptured bladder and secondary peritonitis
- Resting place: Hollywood Forever Cemetery, Los Angeles, California, U.S.
- Other name: Virginia Rappae
- Years active: 1909–1921
- Partner(s): Robert Moscovitz (1916–1916, his death); Henry Lehrman (1919–1921)

Zelliene Virginia Rappe (/rəˈpeɪ/; July 7, 1891 – September 9, 1921) was an American model and silent film actress. Working mostly in bit parts, Rappe died after attending a party with Roscoe "Fatty" Arbuckle, who was tried for manslaughter and rape in connection with her death, though he was ultimately acquitted of both charges three different times.

== Early life and career ==
Virginia Rappe was born in Chicago, Illinois, on July 7, 1891 to a single mother, Mabel Rappe. Mabel died when Rappe was aged 11. Rappe was then raised by her grandmother.

At age 18, she began working as a commercial and artist's model, moving to San Francisco, California, to pursue that career in 1916. There she met dress designer Robert Moscovitz and they became engaged, but shortly afterward he was killed in a streetcar accident.

Rappe moved to Los Angeles, where in early 1917 she was hired by director Fred Balshofer and given a prominent role in his film Paradise Garden, opposite screen star Harold Lockwood. Balshofer hired her again to costar with early drag performer Julian Eltinge and newcomer Rudolph Valentino in Over the Rhine. This film was not released until 1920, when Balshofer recut it and released it under the title An Adventuress, and later in 1922, after Rappe's death, as The Isle of Love. She was named "Best Dressed Girl in Pictures" in 1918.

In 1919, Rappe began a relationship with director and producer Henry Lehrman. The couple eventually became engaged and lived together, but in the United States Census of 1920, the young actress is listed as a "boarder" in Lehrman's home in Los Angeles. Rappe appeared in at least four films for Lehrman: His Musical Sneeze, A Twilight Baby, Punch of the Irish, and A Game Lady. However, since many of Lehrman's films are lost, the exact number of roles she performed for him cannot be determined.

Following Rappe's death, rumors arose, supposedly to besmirch her character, that she had given birth in Chicago in 1918 and put the baby in foster care. These rumors were proven false by autopsy.

== Death ==
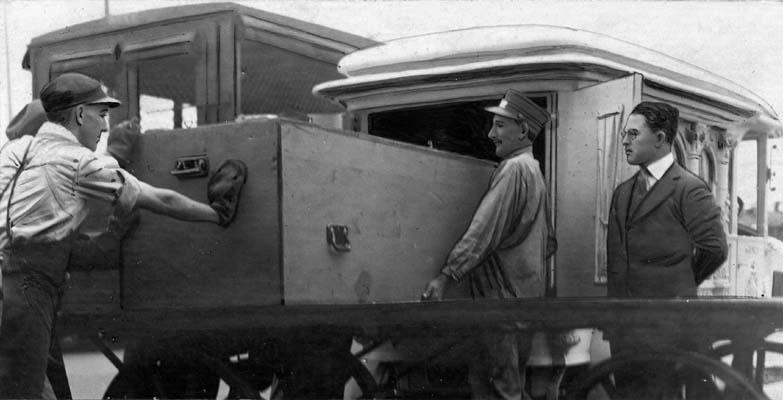
Rappe's casket arrives in Los Angeles, September 17, 1921

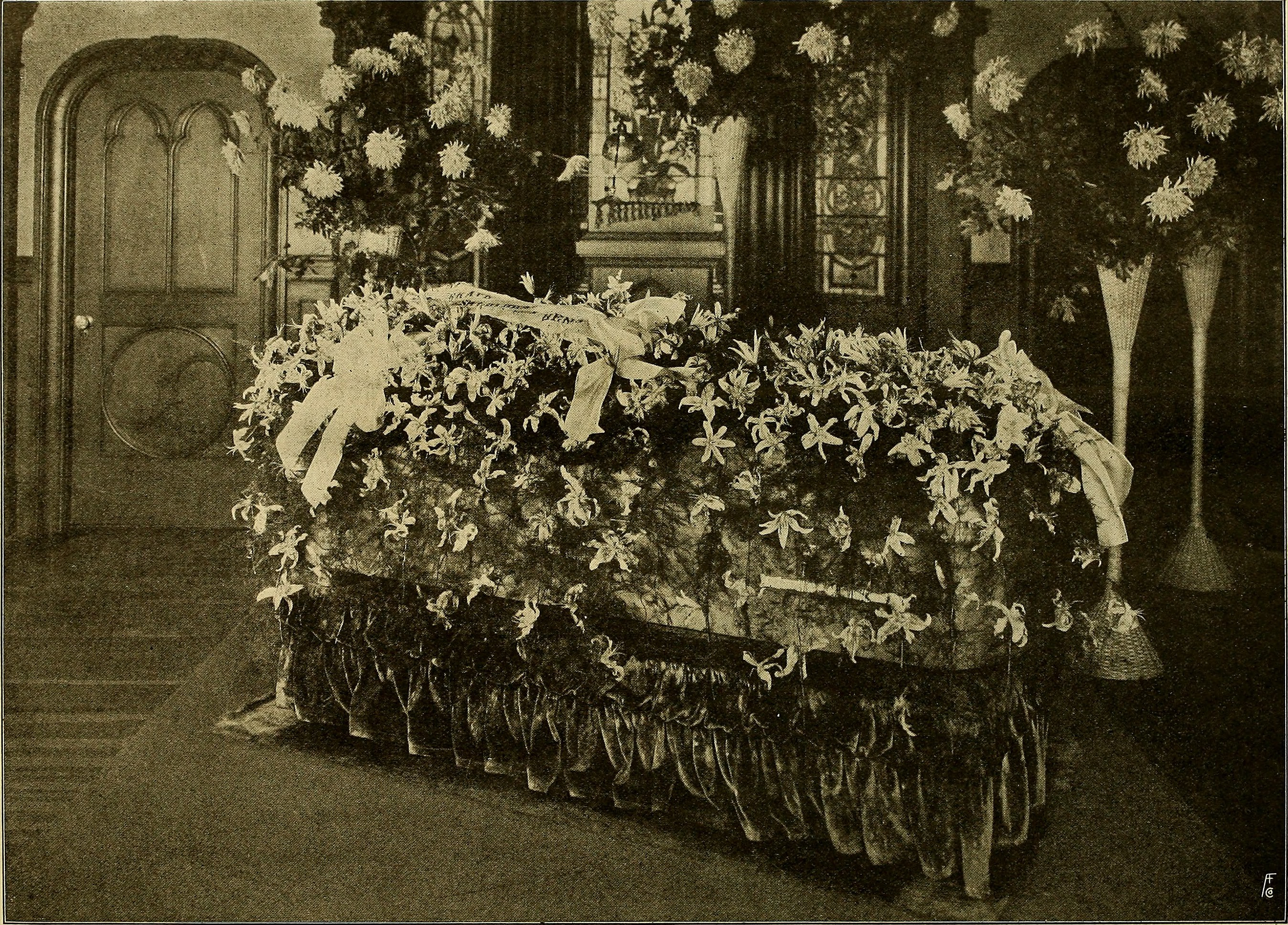
Casket of Virginia Rappe

The circumstances of Rappe's death in 1921 became a Hollywood scandal and were heavily sensationalized by the media of the time. During a party held on Labor Day, September 5, 1921, in Roscoe "Fatty" Arbuckle's suite at the St. Francis Hotel in San Francisco, the alleged but unsubstantiated rape by Arbuckle occurred. She died four days later on September 9 from a ruptured bladder and secondary peritonitis. She is buried at Hollywood Forever Cemetery in Los Angeles alongside her fiancé Henry Lehrman.

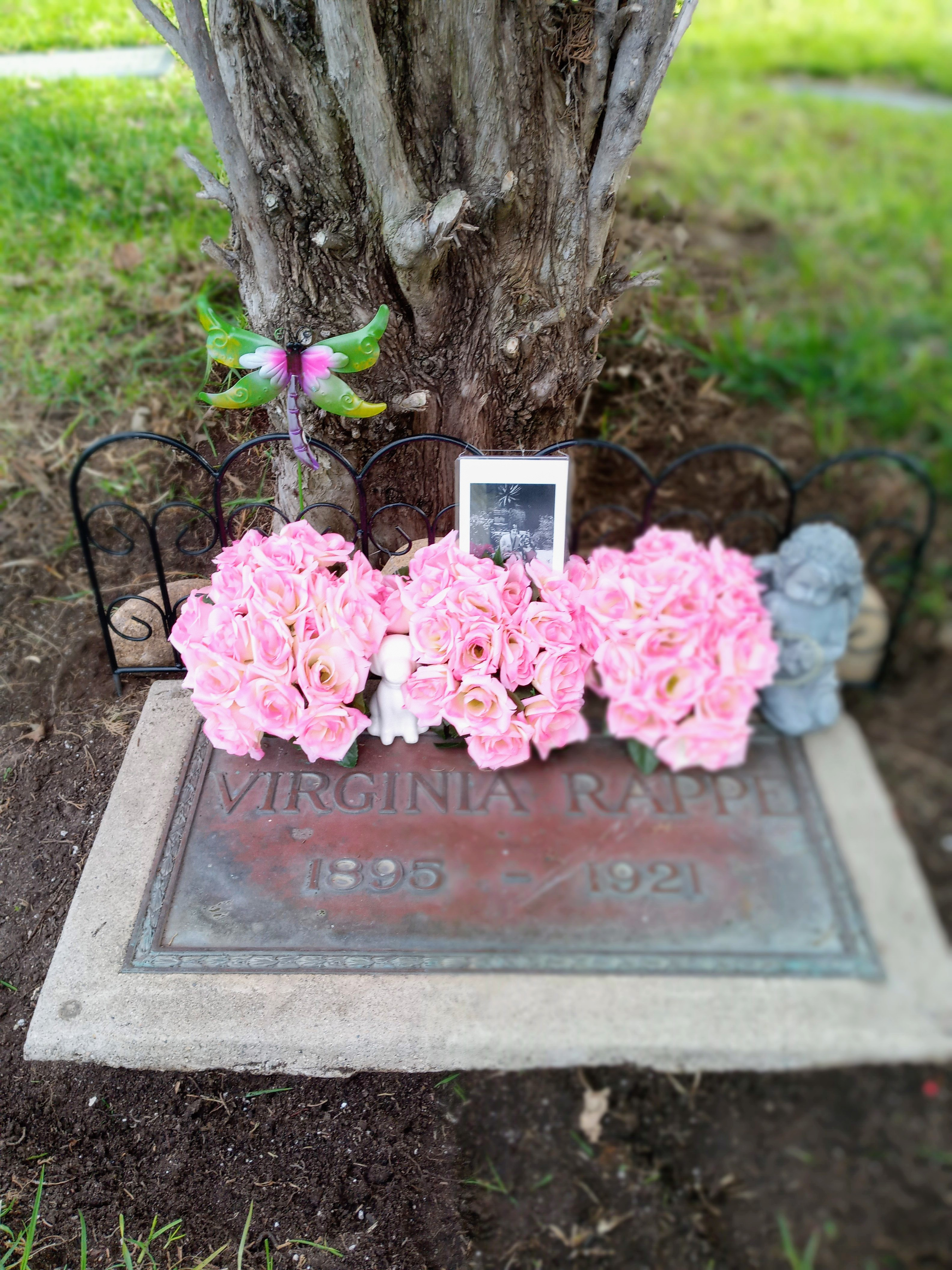
The gravesite of Virginia Rappe (with incorrect birth year) at Hollywood Forever Cemetery, maintained by The Silent Film Cemetery Project

The exact events of the party remain unclear, with witnesses relating numerous versions of what happened. It was alleged that Rappe had died as a result of a violent sexual assault by Arbuckle. Arbuckle's accuser, Bambina Maude Delmont, had accompanied Rappe to the party; she had first met Rappe only a few days earlier. Delmont, however, had a police record for extortion, prostitution, and blackmail. Subsequent witnesses testified that Rappe had for some time suffered from cystitis, a condition which could have been aggravated by consuming alcohol. Witnesses also testified that Rappe had previously suffered from venereal disease, so there was speculation that her death was brought on by her health rather than by an assault; however, her autopsy revealed no sign of venereal disease or any current or prior pregnancies.

After three manslaughter trials, Arbuckle was formally acquitted; his acquittal in the third trial was accompanied by a statement of apology from the jury stating, in part, that, "Acquittal is not enough for Roscoe Arbuckle. We feel that a great injustice has been done him... there was not the slightest proof adduced to connect him in any way with the commission of a crime." Nevertheless, Arbuckle's reputation and career were ruined because of the scandal.

== Filmography ==
Year	Title	Role	Notes	Ref.
1916	The Foolish Virgin	Salesgirl	Uncredited bit part	
1917	Paradise Garden	Marcia Van Wyck	Lost film	
1918	Wild Women and Tame Lions		Lost film; allegedly uncredited	
1919	His Musical Sneeze			
1920	A Twilight Baby			
1920	An Adventuress	Vanette	Reissued in 1922, heavily re-edited, as The Isle of Love	
1920	The Kick in High Life		Uncredited	
1920	Wet and Warmer	Undetermined role	Uncredited	
1921	The Punch of the Irish	The Object Of Attention		
1921	A Game Lady	Undetermined role		

== See also ==
- List of unsolved deaths
- Olive Thomas

== Sources ==
- Ellis, Chris; Ellis, Julie (2005). The Mammoth Book of Celebrity Murder: Murder Played Out In The Spotlight Of Maximum Publicity. Constable & Robertson. ISBN 1-84529-154-9.
- Hallett, Hilary (2013). Go West, Young Women!: The Rise of Early Hollywood. Los Angeles, California: University of California Press. ISBN 978-0-520-27408-2.
