= 1838 in music =

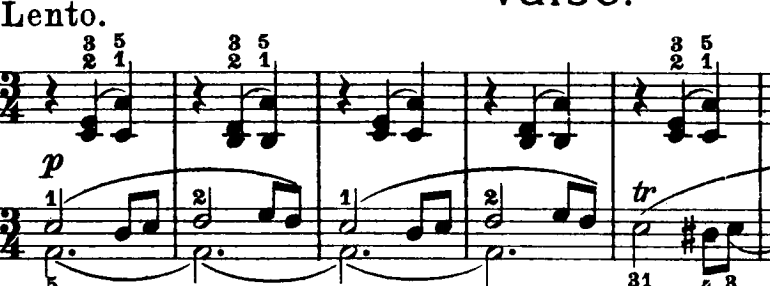
Excerpt from Chopin's Op 34, published 1838

This article is about music-related events in 1838.

== Events ==
- March 7 – Jenny Lind, the "Swedish Nightingale", debuts at the Royal Swedish Opera
- November 8 – The ailing Polish-born composer and pianist Frédéric Chopin begins an uncomfortable (but compositionally productive) winter living with his lover, French novelist George Sand, on the Mediterranean island of Mallorca in the abandoned Carthusian monastery of Valldemossa. Here he writes his 24 Preludes (Op. 28).
- Giovanni Ricordi buys Giuseppe Verdi's copyrights.

== Popular music ==
- "Annie Laurie", words (1688) William Douglas, music Lady John Scott (Alicia Ann Spottiswoode)
- "'Tis Home Where'er the Heart Is" – words by Robert Dale Owen, music by John Hill Hewitt
- "A Life on the Ocean Wave" - words by Epes Sargent, music by Henry Russell

== Classical music ==
- William Sterndale Bennett – Piano Concerto No. 4, Op. 19
- Johanna Kinkel – Das Schloss Boncort, Op.9 (published under J. Mathieux)
- Franz Lachner – Frauenliebe und -leben
- Franz Liszt
  - 'Études d'exécution transcendante d'après Paganini'
  - Grand galop chromatique
- Carl Loewe – 4 Fabellieder, Op.64
- Felix Mendelssohn – String Quartets Op. 44, No. 3 in D Major and No. 5 in E-Flat Major
- Robert Schumann
  - Kinderszenen, Op. 15
  - Kreisleriana, Op. 16
- Louis Spohr
  - String Quintet No.5, Op.106
  - 3 Duette pour deux soparano & piano, Op.108

== Opera ==
- Hector Berlioz – Benvenuto Cellini
- Albert Grisar – Lady Melvil
- Louis Spohr – Der Matrose

== Births ==
- January 6 – Max Bruch, German composer (died 1920)
- March 21 – Wilma Neruda, Moravian-born violinist (died 1911)
- July 9 – Philip Bliss, American Gospel composer (died 1876)
- October 25 – Georges Bizet, French composer (died 1875)

== Deaths ==
- January 13 – Ferdinand Ries, composer and pianist (born 1784)
- March 2 – Ludwig Abeille, composer (born 1761)
- March 24 – Thomas Attwood, organist and composer (b. 1765)
- April 29 – Joseph von Henikstein, patron of the arts and friend of Mozart (b. 1768)
- May 28 – Thomas Busby, English composer (b. 1755)
- July 28 – Bernhard Henrik Crusell, clarinet player and composer (b. 1775)
- August 17 – Lorenzo Da Ponte, librettist
- August 21 – Adelbert von Chamisso, lyricist (born 1781)
- December 26 – Franciszek Lessel, composer (born 1780)
