= Bert Savoy =

American actor

- Born: Everett McKenzie; January 7, 1876 (or 1888); Boston, Massachusetts, US
- Died: June 23, 1923 (aged 47); Long Beach, Long Island, New York, US
- Resting place: Woodlawn Cemetery in the Bronx, New York
- Occupation: Vaudeville performer
- Known for: Female impersonation

Bert Savoy (January 7, 1876 or 1888 – June 26, 1923), born Everett McKenzie, was an American entertainer who specialized in cross-dressing as a vaudeville act. His comedic skits contributed to popular culture with phrases such as "You slay me" and "You don't know the half of it."

== Biography ==
Bert Savoy's date of birth is in dispute; his obituaries in contemporary trade publications do not mention his age at the time of his death.

His first appearance on stage was at a curio museum in Boston, as a dancer. According to Variety, "He obtained the position after watching a 'cooch' dancer work in the place, applied to the management, and was given $6 a week for doing 12 shows a day, alternating with the 'cooch' dancer who was a deaf mute."

Bert Savoy and Jay Brennan (December 5, 1882 – January 14, 1961) were unemployed chorus men who met on a Boston streetcar in 1913. They joined forces for a vaudeville act, which began in the small time and gradually improved to major theaters. By 1917 they were a Broadway attraction: Playbill lists Savoy and Brennan appearing on Broadway in Miss 1917, Ziegfeld Follies 1918, The Greenwich Village Follies of 1920 and The Greenwich Follies of 1922. Savoy was the cross-dressing comedian, elegantly gowned and made up, flamboyantly outspoken, and always ready with catty remarks about other people. Brennan was the straight man, setting up the jokes and reacting to Savoy's outbursts. Savoy's drag-queen mannerisms were an inspiration for Mae West. Savoy was a rival of sorts to the more famous Julian Eltinge.

Savoy and Brennan were a hit on stage. Brennan would begin by saying hello to Savoy, who would stridently shout "Arrrrre you speaking to me, are you speaking to me!" By 1923 they were making $1250 a week on the stage (almost $24,000 in 2026 dollars) and $1500 in vaudeville (about $29,000 in 2026 dollars).

While on tour, Savoy got married in Chicago. After Savoy and Brennan were established as Broadway stars, Mrs. Annie Savoy ran a theatrical apartment house on West 49th Street in New York City. The marriage lasted a few years until Mrs. Savoy returned to Chicago and divorced Savoy.

== Death ==
On June 26, 1923, Bert Savoy was walking with vaudevillian Jack Vincent (Jack C. Grossman) and two male friends on the beach at Long Beach, Long Island, New York during an electrical storm. According to several reports, Savoy heard a clap of thunder and exclaimed, "Mercy, ain't Miss God cutting up something awful?" A bolt of lightning struck him dead immediately; he was wearing a metal locker key around his neck. Vincent, standing next to him, died as well. Jay Brennan was not on the scene, and Billboard described him as "grief-stricken and on the verge of collapse" at Savoy's funeral.

Savoy is buried at the Woodlawn Cemetery in the Bronx, New York. He was the subject of an abstract painting by Charles Demuth, part of a series of abstract, "poster portraits" of friends and acquaintances of the artist, the most famous being I Saw the Figure 5 in Gold. The painting Calla Lilies (Bert Savoy) makes coded references to Savoy's death and life: the wave, seashell and calla lilies to his death, but the flowers also having a well-known symbolism representing sexual orientations, such as bisexuality and homosexuality.

Bert Savoy left behind a single phonograph record, released posthumously. He and Jay Brennan had signed a recording contract with the Vocalion label, resulting in only one recording session a month before Savoy's death.

== Continuing the act ==
Jay Brennan revived the act with former Ziegfeld Follies comedian Ann Butler, whose sly, drawling delivery was embellished by an outspoken manner (similar to Bert Savoy's) and a cackling laugh. In June of 1929 Brennan and Butler were invited to film their act; it survives in the Warner Bros.-Vitaphone short You Don't Know the Half of It (1929), available to today's audiences as part of the Vitaphone Varieties, Volume Two DVD set. Six weeks later, Butler left the act, preferring to work solo; she became a network radio star (Variety called her "NBC's only femme comic"). When Butler used an old Brennan & Butler sketch on radio in 1933, author Jay Brennan stopped short of legal action but advised the network of the plagiarism.

Jay Brennan made one solo appearance in a 1934 Vitaphone short and, according to Variety, relocated to Hollywood where he became a scriptwriter, again with Warner Bros. He retired to Brooklyn, New York and died in 1961.

== See also ==
- Julian Eltinge
- Bothwell Browne
- Karyl Norman
