= Piano Sonata No. 5 (Hummel) =

Piano sonata composed by Johann Nepomuk Hummel

- by Johann Nepomuk Hummel
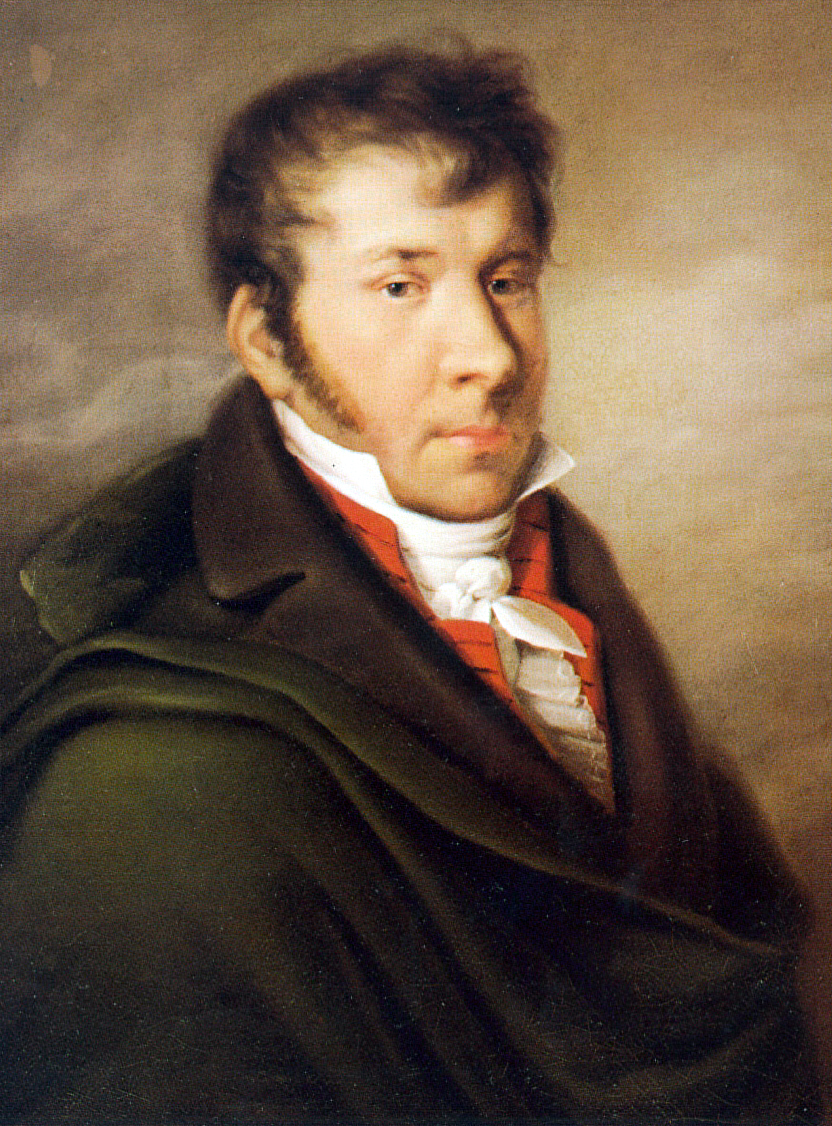
- Portrait of Hummel by Joseph Willibrord Mähler,c. 1814
- Key: F♯ minor
- Opus: 81
- Composed: 1819
- Dedication: Princess Marie of Saxe-Weimar-Eisenach
- Published: 1819
- Publisher: Steiner
- Duration: 23-35 minutes
- Movements: 3
- Scoring: piano

Johann Nepomuk Hummel's Piano Sonata No. 5 in F♯ minor, Op. 81 was written and published in 1819. The work is written in a proto-Romantic style that anticipates the later stylistic developments of composers such as Frédéric Chopin, Franz Liszt, Robert Schumann, Charles-Valentin Alkan, Felix Mendelssohn, and Johannes Brahms.

== Structure ==
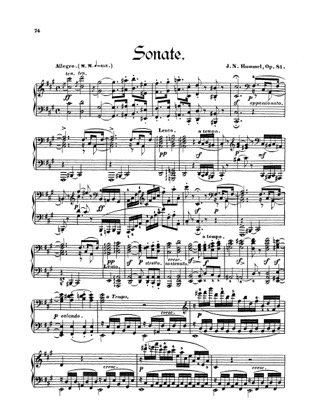
First page of the first movement of Hummel's Piano Sonata Op. 81

This sonata has three movements:

1. Allegro
2. Largo con molto espressione (in B minor)
3. Finale: Vivace

The first movement is in sonata form. The movement has been described as a "stylistic mélange of writing that more closely resembles a fantasy than a formally structured sonata first movement (there is no exposition repeat, for example)."

The second movement, marked Largo con molto espressione, is in B minor and 3/4 time.

The finale is in rondo form and returns to the sonata's home key of F♯ minor. It is the most technically challenging movement, featuring double thirds and fugal passages.

== Reception and influence ==
This sonata influenced certain works of Schumann, Chopin, and Brahms. Joel Lester points out the similarities between this sonata and Schumann's Allegro Op. 8 and Piano Sonata No. 1 in F♯ minor, Op. 11. Schumann said that the work will "alone immortalize his [Hummel's] name." Chopin based his Piano Sonata No. 3 on this sonata. This sonata may also have influenced Brahms' Piano Sonata No. 2 in F♯ minor, Op. 2.
