= Emilia Uggla =

Swedish pianist and singer

Emilia "Emilie" Maria Sara Sofia Uggla (24 February 1819 in Karlstad – 15 February 1855 in Upperud), was a Swedish noble classical concert pianist and concert singer. Uggla made her debut in 1830, in a public concert in Stockholm, when she was eleven. The following year she held a recital of her own, and toured Sweden, Norway and Denmark from 1831 to 1843. She also played in Finland and Russia, where performed at the Imperial court of the Czar. Later Uggla worked as a music teacher, retiring from her public career to get married in 1847.

== Life ==
Emilia Uggla was the daughter of nobleman and captain Carl Wilhelm Uggla and Sara Johanna Frykman. She was the piano student of Olof Willman.

Uggla was a concert pianist and singer. She made her debut in 1830, when she participated anonymously in a public concert in Stockholm at the age of eleven. In 1831, she held a public concert under her own name at Stora Börssalen in Stockholm. From 1831 to 1843, she toured Sweden, Norway and Denmark, and in 1838–1840 in Finland and Russia, where she performed at the Imperial court of the Czar. She travelled with her father and younger sister, Aspasia, who also sang at some of her concerts.

In 1843–47, she worked as a musical teacher. She retired from her career in 1847, when she married the noble Theodor Wilhelm Christian Uggla. They had four sons and two daughters together.

She died following a difficult childbirth in 1855 aged 36, and is buried at Skållerud cemetery in Dalsland.

The poet Johan Nybom dedicated the poem "Till en ung sångerska" ("To a Young Singer") to her.
