= Wendell J. Westcott =

American carillonneur (1911–2010)

- Born: January 20, 1911; Jackson, Michigan, US
- Died: April 30, 2010 (aged 99); Lansing, Michigan, US
- Occupation: Carillonneur
- Years active: 1941–1987

Wendell J. Westcott (January 20, 1911 – April 30, 2010) was an American Carillonneur at Michigan State University from 1941 to 1987, and the creator and director of the Spartan Bell Ringers, a musical group composed of MSU students. Westcott was the author of Bells and Their Music, published in 1970. He served in the United States Army during World War II, and was stationed for much of that time in Egypt.
