= Winona Winter =

American vaudevillian and silent-film actress (1889–1940)

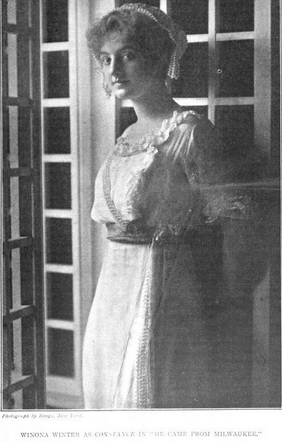
- Winona Winter as "Constance" in He Came from Milwaukee, from a 1911 publication.
- Born: Huntsville, Alabama, U.S.
- Died: April 27, 1940; Los Angeles, California, U.S.
- Occupation: Actress

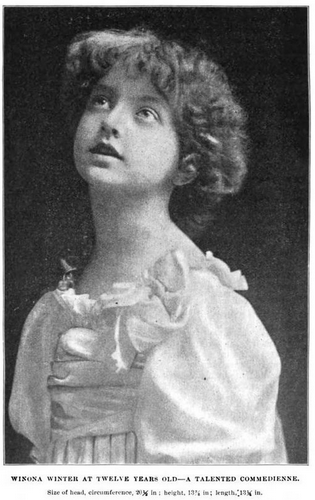
Winona Winter as a child

Winona Winter (died April 27, 1940) was an American vaudeville performer and silent-film actress.

== Early life ==
Winona Winter was the daughter of minstrel songwriter William Banks Winter and Clara Demming Newman Winter. She had two younger brothers. Winter acted as a child, in The Little Tycoon (1895) in Detroit. In 1901, her skull was examined by phrenologists in a published case study, which found her to be gifted, especially in humor and memory.

== Career ==
In vaudeville Winter was best known for "soubrette" parts, as a singing comedian, and as a ventriloquist. She performed with Will Rogers in Rochester in 1908, in New York in 1910, and in Chicago in 1912, and was associated with Harry Lauder's company in 1922. She was still performing in vaudeville in 1928, with an act she called "Broadway-o-grams", a selection of short character sketches and celebrity impersonations.

Winter appeared in four Broadway musical productions: The Little Cherub (1906–1907), He Came from Milwaukee (1910), The Fascinating Widow (1911), and The Broadway Whirl (also called The Century Midnight Whirl) (1921).

She played "Sally" in the silent film The Man from Mexico (1914).

== Personal life ==
Winter married Norman L. Sper, a sports announcer. They had a son, Norman L. Sper Jr., born in 1925.

In 1940, Winter died in Los Angeles, California. Winter was 51.
