= Dixie Doodle =

Dixie Doodle is a parody of Yankee Doodle in the South at the time of the American Civil War. It was written in 1862 by Margaret Weir, published in New Orleans, and dedicated to "our dear Soldiers on the Battle Field".

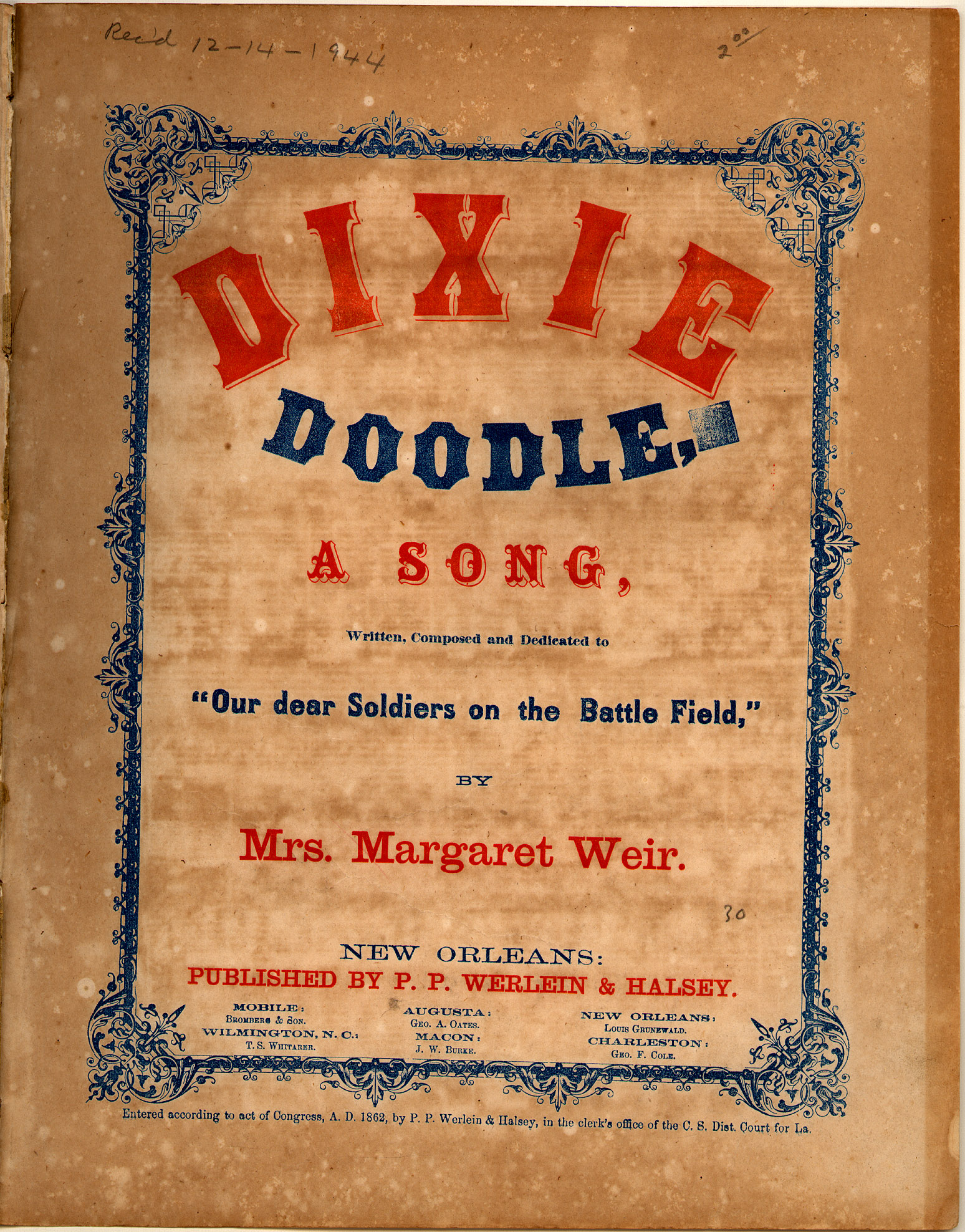
Cover of the 1862 sheet music published by Werlein & Halsey

== Lyrics ==
1. Dixie whipped old Yankee Doodle
Early in the morning,
So Yankeedom had best look out,
And take a timely warning.

Chorus

Hurrah! for our Dixie Land!
Hurrah! for our borders!
Southern boys to arms will stand,
And whip the dark marauders!

2. Yankee Doodles soundly slept
Upon their greasy pillows,
While Dixie boys, with muffled oars,
Were gliding o'er the billows.

3. Yankee Doodles, grease your heels,
Make ready to be running,
For Dixie boys are near at hand,
Surpassing you in cunning.

4. Anderson, the gallant brave,
Who broke upon their slumbers,
E'en little girls and boys shall sing
Your name in tuneful numbers.

5. A thousand blessings on your heads,
Our brave, unflinching leaders,
A light you are upon the path
Of all our brave seceders.

6. Wright, on Carolina's coast,
Was e'er a hero bolder?
He seized a Yankee foe, and made
A breastwork of the soldier.

7. Louisiana, bold and brave,
Renowned for Creole beauty,
Your champions will bear in mind
The watchword, grace and booty!

8. Yankee Doodle, fair thee well,
Ere long you'll be forgotten,
While Dixie's notes shall gaily float
Throughout the land of cotton.

== See also ==
- Yankee Doodle
- Union Dixie
