= The Fascinating Widow =

Play by Otto Hauerbach

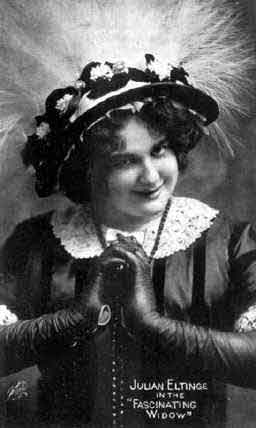
- Music: Frederick W. Mills
- Lyrics: Otto Harbach
- Book: Otto Harbach
- Premiere: November 14, 1910: Apollo Theatre, Atlantic City, New Jersey

The Fascinating Widow is a 1910 musical comedy with music by Frederick W. Mills and both book and lyrics by Otto Harbach. It was created as a starring vehicle for the female impersonator Julian Eltinge. The play premiered in Atlantic City, New Jersey, then toured the United States for 10 months before appearing on Broadway in September 1911.

== Productions ==
The play premiered at the Apollo Theatre in Atlantic City, New Jersey on November 14, 1910, with A.H. Woods producing. Woods toured the show around the United States, then brought it back to the Apollo in August 1911, before taking it to Broadway. It opened on Broadway at the Liberty Theatre on September 11, 1911. After a seven-week run on Broadway, the show returned to the road, where it ran for several more years. The 1912-1913 national tour starred Eltinge in his same role as Hal Blake/Mrs. Monte and actress Belle Adair as Margaret Leffingwell.

== Cast and characters ==
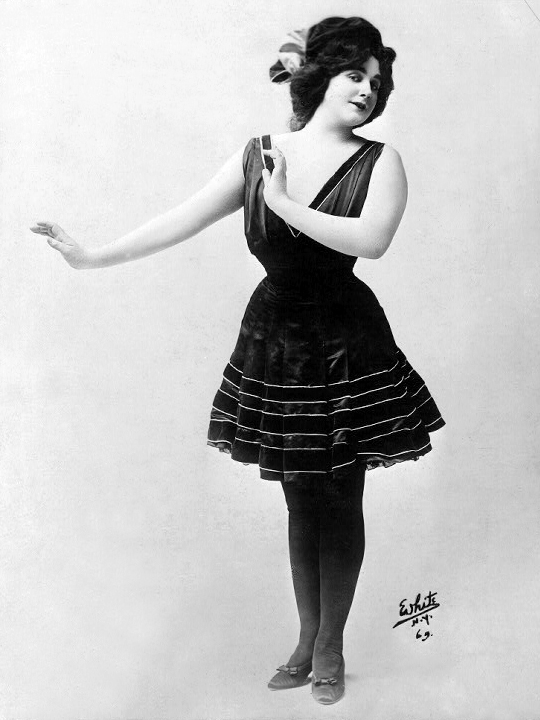
Julian Eltinge in The Fascinating Widow

The characters and cast from the Broadway production are given below:

Cast of the Broadway production
| Character | Broadway cast |
|---|---|
| Ivy Tracy | Natalie Alt |
| Bessie Bothwell | Marie Baxter |
| Harriet Halford | Blanche Burnham |
| Reverend Wilbur Watts | Charles W. Butler |
| Hal Blake/Mrs. Monte | Julian Eltinge |
| Lottie Lovedale | Gladys Feldman |
| Lankton Wells | Edward Garvie |
| Tessie Danforth | June Mathis |
| Ethel Ethridge | Jean Morrell |
| Maisie Mannering | Louise Orth |
| Mrs. Leffingwell | Carrie E. Perkins |
| Nella Northrup | Dorothy Sanders |
| Cissie Cyril | Natalie Seymour |
| Tuthill Leffingwell | James Spottswood |
| Nick Bulgler | James E. Sullivan |
| Oswald Wentworth | Lionel Walsh |
| John Wilson | Frank Wentworth |
| Rholla Rollins | Dorothy Wilcox |
| Margaret Leffingwell | Winona Winter |

== Adaptations ==
The play was adapted as a silent film in 1925.
