= The Isle of Love =

1922 American silent film

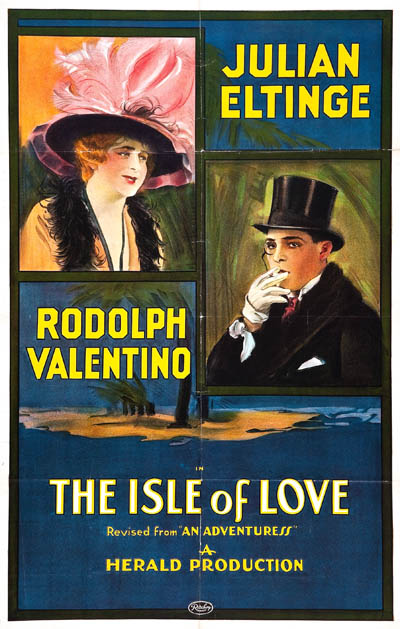
- Film poster
- Directed by: Fred J. Balshofer
- Written by: Fred J. Balshofer
- Produced by: Fred J. Balshofer
- Starring: Julian Eltinge; Rudolph Valentino; Virginia Rappe
- Cinematography: Tony Gaudio
- Production company: Herald Productions
- Distributed by: Republic Distributing
- Release date: 1922
- Running time: 39 minutes
- Country: United States
- Language: Silent (English intertitles)

The Isle of Love is a 1922 American silent drama film written, produced and directed by Fred J. Balshofer. The film stars Julian Eltinge, Virginia Rappe, Rudolph Valentino, Frederick Ko Vert, William Clifford and Leo White.

Balshofer shot this film in 1918, under the title Over the Rhine, as an anti-German war drama, although the film was never released under that title due to diminished interest in war films after the armistice. The film was then released in 1920 as An Adventuress with some plot alterations. In 1922 Balshofer copyrighted the film under the title The Isle of Love, and released it on a state rights basis. The 1922 copyright entry credits only Balshofer as the writer of The Isle of Love.

== Plot ==
The Isle of Love, run by a power-mad duke, is in turmoil. The peasants plan a revolt, with two buddies, including Cliff, planning to overthrow the corrupt Duke.

Cliff invites his friend Jacques to help, though Jacques spends most of his time with his love Vanette. Meanwhile, Cliff dresses up as a female as part of the plan and after much chaos all is well and he returns to America safe and sound.

== Cast ==
- Julian Eltinge (Note: In the 1918 and 1920 versions, his characters were named Jack Perry and Elsa von Bohn) as Clifford Townsend / Julie
- Virginia Rappe as Vanette
- Rudolph Valentino (Note: In the 1918 version, he was billed as R. di Valentino, and in the subsequent re-cuts, he was billed as Rodolph Valentino) as Jacques Rudanyi
- Frederick Ko Vert as Lyn Brook
- William Clifford as Dick Sayre
- Leo White as Prince Halbere
- Stanton Beck as Grand Duke Nebo
- Charles Millfield as Pom Pom

== Release of the different versions ==
=== Over the Rhine ===
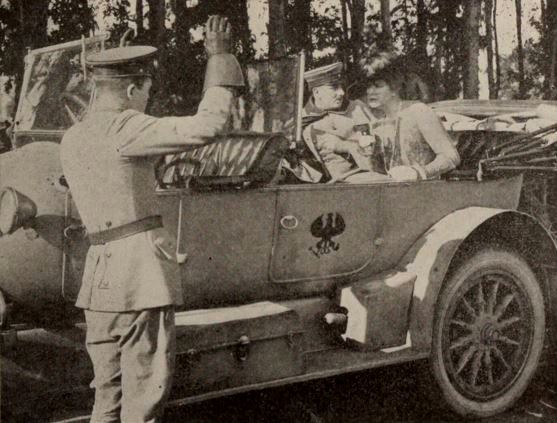
Film still from Over the Rhine with Eltinge and Leo White

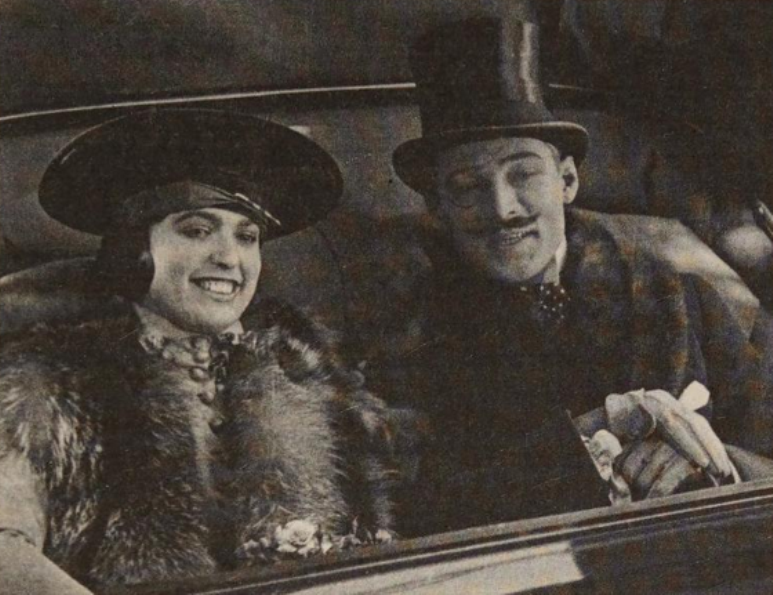
Film still from Over the Rhine with Virginia Rappe and Rudolph Valentino

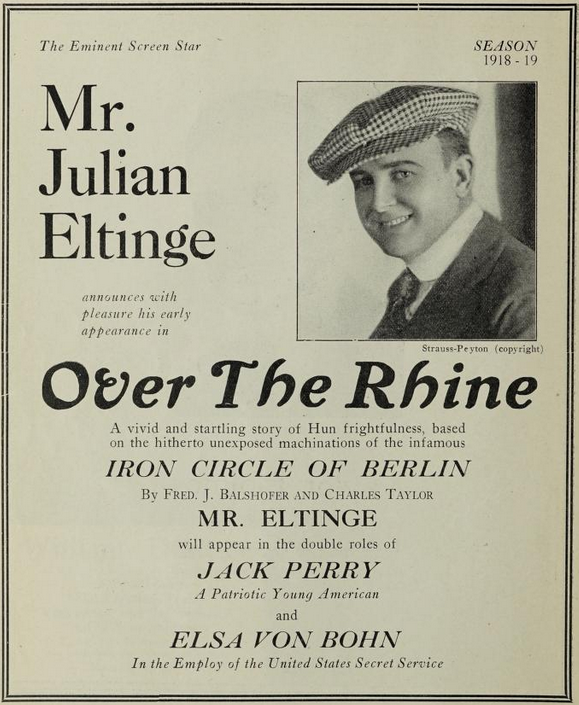
Trade advertisement with Eltinge for Over the Rhine

Balshofer shot this film in 1918, under the title Over the Rhine, as an anti-German war drama, although the film was never released under that title due to diminished interest in war films after the armistice. The film was described as Eltinge appearing as an American college man finishing his education at Heidelberg, Germany, at the outbreak of the war. Using his cleverness at impersonating a beautiful woman, he succeeds in learning the innermost secrets of the German general staff for the advantage of the Allied armies. The story is approached from an entirely different angle from any war picture yet made, and shows the workings of the kaiser's spy system in America prior to the war. The credits given for this version of the film show Balshofer and Charles A. Taylor as the writers, and that it was produced by Eltinge's own production company.

In August 1918, the Dramatic Mirror of Motion Pictures and the Stage reported that Fred Balshofer, after a speedy few weeks in New York, had departed for the West Coast to begin work on his first production starring Julian Eltinge. The play carries a whanging title, Over the Rhine, and is from the pen of Balshofer himself. In October 1918, The Moving Picture World noted that a new method of tinting pictures had been discovered by the Sanborn Laboratories at Culver City, California, and one of the first moving picture stars to take advantage of the invention is Julian Eltinge, who will use the process to tint some of the scenes in Over the Rhine. In November 1918, it was announced that Julian Eltinge had just finished Over the Rhine, and will start work on a new picture in the course of a couple of weeks.

Contemporaneous reporting stated that for this version of the film it was the first time in the history of aviation — 102 two-seated planes were sent away simultaneously at March Field, in Riverside, California, for a scene in Over the Rhine. The starting signal was given by Sergeant Stevens, (Note: No first name was given in any of the multiple news articles for Sergeant Stevens.) who is probably the greatest flier in the United States, and with a cloud of dust the 102 planes taxied off and then rose in the air and flew straight ahead. Several cameras were used, and they were so placed that every plane was caught in flight. The usual procedure in making a flight with three or four planes is for each one to circle around after taking off, but with 102 in the air at once this was impossible, so it was necessary for each plane to keep straight ahead, and the traffic was so heavy in the air that many of the aviators flew thirty miles before deeming it safe to return. Stunt flying for the film was performed by Sergeant Stevens, who so impressed Balshofer, that a part was written into the story just for the flier, marking the first time that an American army aviator has ever appeared in the cast of a motion picture. It was also reported that Eltinge went up in an aeroplane while making scenes for the film.

Balshofer's autobiography indicates that he planned two endings to the original 1918 version, since World War I was coming to an end. In November 1918, The Moving Picture World reported the two endings for the picture, each appropriate and logical if certain changes occur in the war before the picture is released. One of these endings has to do with the present peace negotiations in the event of a peaceful ending of the war. But the other, and the one that is preferred by both producer and star, shows the victorious entry of the American troops into Berlin. For the making of these scenes permission was obtained from the Government to make use of the soldiers and equipment at Camp Kearny, in Linda Vista, California. The actual crossing of the Rhine, with the soldiers making their bridges across the stream, is shown in the film. A street in the German capital was built on a plot of ground adjoining the army camp.

Balshofer wrote in his 1967 book One Reel A Week:

On November 11, 1918, the day World War I ended, I had just completed cutting and titling a six-reel all-out anti-Kaiser picture. It starred Julian Eltinge with Virginia Rappe, William Clifford, and Fred Heck in the other principal roles. Rudolph Valentino had a supporting part at twenty-five dollars per day. Despite the fact that it was a well-made big picture, nobody wanted to show war pictures now that the conflict was over, so I lost nearly eighty thousand dollars on it.

Despite this version of the film not having a general release, the film was shown on November 19, 1918, at the Florence Theatre in Pasadena, California. The Pasadena Star-News described the film as having a well conceived and rapidly developing plot dealing with the adventures of a young American in Berlin when the war breaks out, who adopts feminine disguise to escape the consequences of killing a German officer.

=== An Adventuress ===
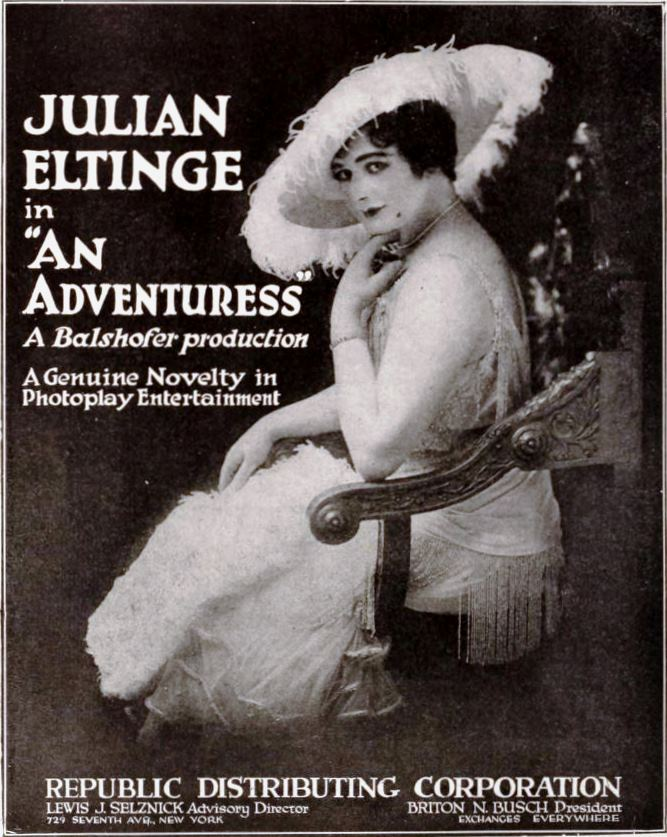
Trade advertisement for An Adventuress with Eltinge

The film was then released in 1920 as An Adventuress with some plot alterations, and Paul M. Bryan and Thomas J. Geraghty listed as the writers. In this version, the story revolves around Alpania, a small country by the sea, which has becone the scene of much discord and intrigue due to an effort of the monarchists to depose the republicans who are in power. Three American adventurers, Jack Perry, Dick Sayre and Lyn Brook, learn of the trouble and decide to mix in. Jack is caught and is sentenced by the royalists to be shot at sunrise. From this fate he is rescued by Lyn who arrives in an aeroplane and by dropping a bomb, destroys all but Jack.

Jack then contrives to learn the secret plans of the enemy and thereafter forward them to the republicans. To do this, he adopts the costume of a lady and tries his wiles on the foreign princess and potentates. He is known as Fedora and becomes very popular. His pal Lyn, also disguises himself as a lady and while Jack is carrying the news to the republicans, Lyn is left to divert the attention of the duke. He is amazingly successful, and in promenading on the beach receives the admiring glances of many men, to his keen enjoyment.

Jack is once more captured and is forced to pilot an enemy aeroplane in order to escape. He manages to keep the enemy at bay until he alights and dashes off in an automobile. He is hotly pursued in a perilous ride, but finally evades his foes and gets safely back to America and his sweet heart.

=== The Isle of Love ===
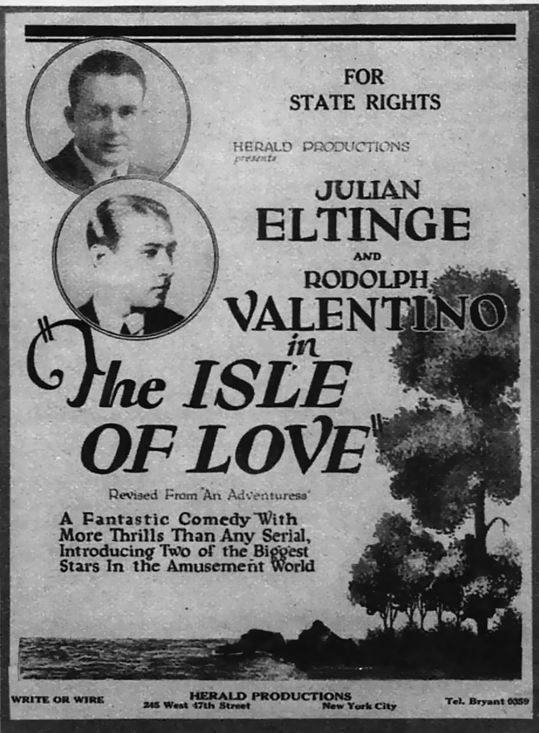
Trade advertisement for The Isle of Love with Valentino second billed

In 1922, Balshofer copyrighted the film under the title The Isle of Love, and released it on a state rights basis. The 1922 copyright entry credits only Balshofer as the writer of this version. Balshofer recalled that in making this version of the film:

Valentino had become a big star by virtue of his performances in The Four Horsemen and Blood and Sand. I remembered that he had appeared in the war picture I had made in 1918, so I dug it out of the vault, spent around ten thousand dollars shooting additional scenes, stuck in all the cutouts of him that I could, and changed the main title. By using different spoken titles, it was possible to alter the picture from a serious one to a light comedy. I renamed it The Isle of Love, and publicized it as co-starring Valentino and Eltinge.

The Exhibitors Herald also noted the popularity of Valentino, especially since the showing of Blood and Sand, had created a heavy demand for any good picture in which he had appeared. One of the latest to be offered is The Isle of Love, featuring Valentino, which is being distributed to state right buyers by Herald Productions, which it is said, is being booked rapidly by many of the leading exhibitors.

The Chicago Tribune concurred as well, sarcastically writing that motion picture producers have a new little game. It is called 'find a picture with Rodolf Valentino somewhere in it'. They are frenziedly pawing among films they had thought shelved forever, in the hope that they shall discover — even though it be among the extras — the glowing countenance of the favorite of the hour. The Isle of Love was once called An Adventuress, and Julian Eltinge was once the hero. Now, behold! we have another Rodolf Valentino picture, and Mr. Eltinge, while mentioned, is merely mentioned.

=== Home media ===
An Adventuress was released on DVD-R in 2016 by Silent Hall of Fame Enterprises. Silent Era criticized the publisher "for their overpriced offerings that give the consumer as little value as possible."

== Reception ==
Film critic Donato Totaro opined that the movie is "an example of what can happen when a film rises Phoenix like from the ashes one too many times; attempting any semblance of a plot synopsis would be pointless; various shots were repeated several times; some scenes were projected on a loop; in addition, the locale of the new picture was switched from World War 1 Germany to a desert island by the simple expedient of inserting shots of bathing beauties on a palm-fringed beach throughout the film."

Chris Petit from Time Out wrote "in 1922 ... Balshofer recut his footage and boosted Valentino's part with outtakes; the outcome is pretty loopy ... most of the film's interest comes from its blatant efforts to cash in: a silent conversation between Rappe and Valentino takes on dimensions that Balshofer could never have dreamed of in 1920."

L. F. Fowler from Screenland observed "these people probably had some new titles made, re-cut the picture, inserted the new titles and advertised it as The Isle of Love, in big type, while underneath they printed in smaller type (as required by a federal law) 'Revised from An Adventuress', calling the exhibitor's attention to the fact that this picture was and is 'A Fantastic Comedy With More Thrills Than Any Serial, Introducing Two of the Biggest Stars in the Amusement World' — INTRODUCING! Why didn't the people who had the film in the first place advertise it that way? Because Rudolph Valentino hadn't made a reputation for himself yet and the exhibitor or the distributor could not cash in on his name!"

== See also ==
- List of American films of 1918
- List of American films of 1920
- List of American films of 1922
- List of LGBTQ-related films of the 1920s
- List of films in the public domain in the United States
