= Julian Eltinge =

American actor (1881–1941)

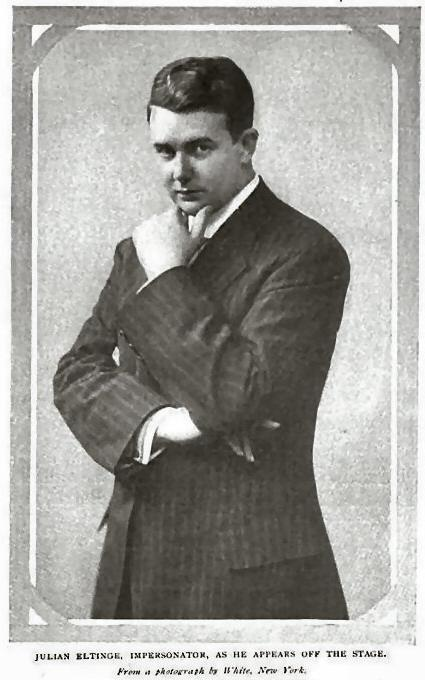
- Eltinge, c. 1908
- Born: William Julian Dalton; May 14, 1881; Newtonville, Massachusetts, US
- Died: March 7, 1941 (aged 59); New York City, US
- Resting place: Forest Lawn Memorial Park, Glendale
- Occupation: Actor

Julian Eltinge (born William Julian Dalton; May 14, 1881 – March 7, 1941) was an American actor notable for playing female characters. After appearing in the Boston Cadets Revue at the age of ten in feminine garb, Eltinge garnered notice from producers and made his first appearance on Broadway in 1904. As his star began to rise, he appeared in vaudeville and toured Europe and the United States, even giving a command performance before King Edward VII. Eltinge appeared in a series of musical comedies written specifically for his talents starting in 1910 with The Fascinating Widow, returning to vaudeville in 1918. His popularity soon earned him the moniker "Mr. Lillian Russell" for the popular beauty and musical comedy star.

Hollywood beckoned Eltinge and in 1917 he appeared in his first feature film, The Countess Charming. This led to other films, including 1918's The Isle of Love with Rudolph Valentino and Virginia Rappe. By the time Eltinge arrived in Hollywood, he was considered one of the highest paid actors on the American stage; but with the arrival of the Great Depression and the death of vaudeville, Eltinge's star began to fade. He continued his show in nightclubs but found little success. He died in 1941 at his Manhattan apartment ten days after a show at a nearby nightclub.

== Early years ==
Eltinge was born in Newtonville, Massachusetts, to Julia Edna Baker and Michael Joseph Dalton. It is believed that his father was a mining engineer and that early in his life he traveled out west with his father, ending up in Butte, Montana. In his early teens, Eltinge dressed in women's clothing and performed in saloons patronized by ranchers and miners. Upon discovering this in 1899, his father beat him and his mother sent him back to Boston, where the 17-year-old worked in dry goods as a salesman while studying dance.

The early film star Pauline Frederick and Eltinge were childhood friends. They met up again at boarding school in Boston when Eltinge was already making a name for himself on the vaudeville stage. He dared her to apply to one of the music halls, which was the start of her career on stage and in films.

Most sources cite his first female role originally having been at the age of ten with the Boston Cadets Review at the Tremont Theater in Boston. He is reported to have played the role so well that the next year the revue was written around him which led to minor roles elsewhere. But as to how he came to perform as a female a decade later with the Boston Cadets, sources differ. In some versions he was taking cakewalk lessons from a Mrs. Wyman's dance studio when he demonstrated to his teacher a remarkable ability to emulate females. It is said to be Mrs. Wyman who encouraged William to study the art of female impersonation.

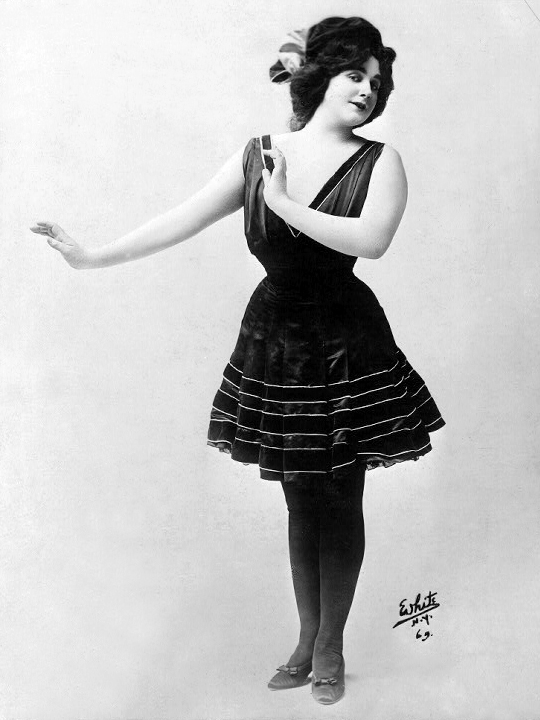
Eltinge in The Fascinating Widow (1911)

== Broadway and vaudeville ==
Eltinge's first appearance on Broadway was in the musical comedy Mr. Wix of Wickham which opened September 19, 1904 at the Bijou Theatre in New York City. The show was produced by E. E. Rice and included music by Jerome Kern among others.

During this time, Eltinge began performing in vaudeville. Unlike many of the female impersonation acts that existed at that time, like Bert Savoy, Eltinge did not present a caricature of women but presented the illusion of actually being a woman. He toured simply as "Eltinge" which left his sex unknown and his act included singing, dancing and quick costume changes in a variety of female roles, including a Gibson Girl-like role called "The Sampson Girl". At the conclusion of his performances, he would remove his wig, revealing his true nature to the surprise of the often unknowing audience.

In 1906, Eltinge made his London debut at the Palace Theater. While in London, Eltinge gave a performance for King Edward VII, who later presented him with a white bulldog. The next year, Eltinge made his New York debut at the Alhambra Theater to critical acclaim. From 1908-09, he toured with Cohan and Harris Minstrels.

By 1910, Eltinge had reached the height of his fame. Sime Silverman, Editor of Variety, called him "as great a performer as there is today".

== The Fascinating Widow and beyond ==
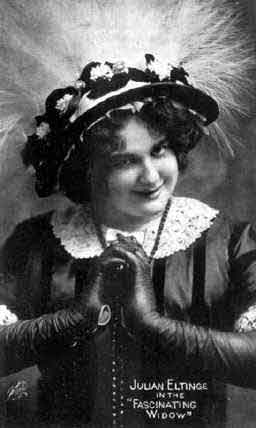
Another publicity photo for The Fascinating Widow

In 1911, Eltinge opened one of his most famous shows, The Fascinating Widow, at New York's Liberty Theater. In it, he played Hal Blake who disguises himself as "Mrs. Monte" in a Charley's Aunt-like plot. The show only ran 56 performances in New York, but toured the nation successfully for several years.

The success of this show led producer A. H. Woods to give Eltinge one of the entertainment industry's highest honors, having a theatre named for him. A year to the day that The Fascinating Widow opened, Woods opened the Eltinge Theatre on New York's 42nd Street designed by noted theater architect Thomas W. Lamb. Eltinge himself never performed in his namesake building. After serving as a legitimate theater for many years, it became a notorious burlesque house and was shut down during a "public morality" campaign in 1942, before becoming a cinema the next year. The theater is now part of the AMC Empire 25 cineplex having been lifted and moved in its entirety down the block from its original location.

Following on the success of The Fascinating Widow, Eltinge performed in two other comedies that had similar success, The Crinoline Girl which opened in 1914 and Cousin Lucy (with music by Kern) the next year.

== Hollywood and film career ==
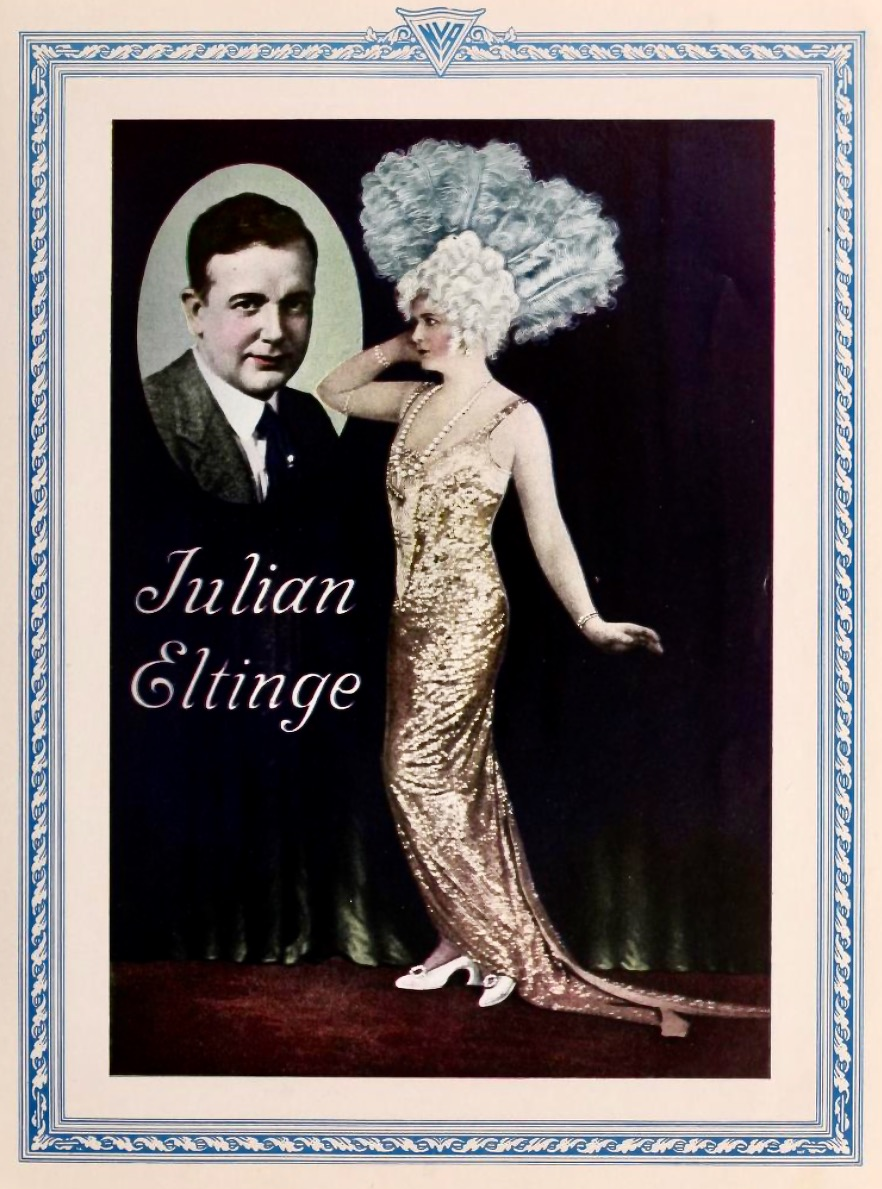
Julian Eltinge, 1925

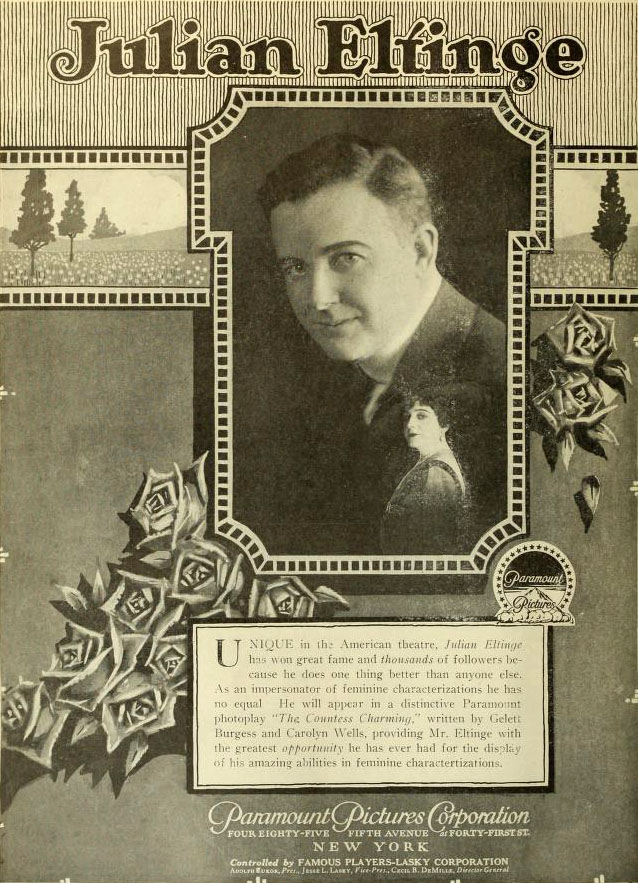
Advertisement in Moving Picture World, August 1917

In 1914, Eltinge starred in silent picture versions of The Crinoline Girl followed by Cousin Lucy the next year. According to Anthony Slide's The Encyclopedia of Vaudeville, he also had a cameo role in a film entitled How Molly Malone Made Good in 1915. Eltinge's first real screen success came in 1917 in The Countess Charming. His role in the film was again a double role with him playing both a male and said male in female garb.

Settling in Hollywood, Eltinge made three films in 1917 and also in 1918. During this time he wrote and produced a vaudeville group called "The Julian Eltinge Players". With this group he returned to the vaudeville stage appearing at New York City's Palace Theatre in 1918, where he was paid one of the highest salaries in show business: $3,500 a week. The next year he returned again in a new vaudeville review with sets by the French designer Erté.

By 1920, Eltinge was very wealthy and was living in one of the most lavish mansions in Southern California, Villa Capistrano. He appeared with Rudolf Valentino in the 1920 film An Adventuress (released as The Isle of Love in the U.S.). After filming, Eltinge continued touring onstage and did so until 1927. He also made two films, Madame Behave and The Fascinating Widow, in 1925.

== Personal life ==
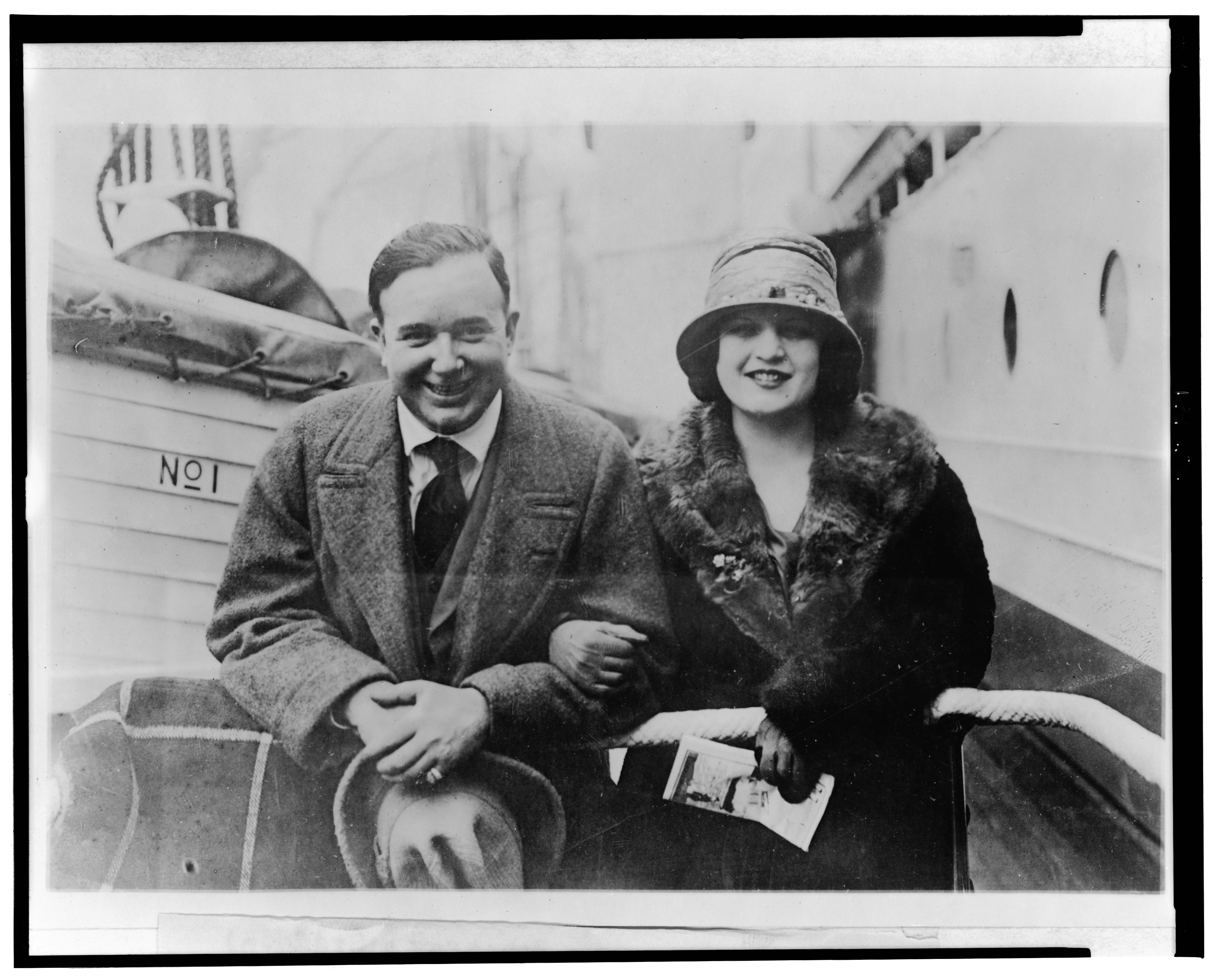
Eltinge on a voyage to Japan with a woman (vaudeville actress Laurette Bullivant) he identified to the photographer as his wife, c. 1920

Despite the graceful femininity he exhibited on stage, Eltinge used a supermasculine facade in public to combat the rumours of his homosexuality. This sexual duality led to Chicago Tribune drama critic Percy Hammond's using the term "ambisextrous" to describe him.

Eltinge may have been gay, as Milton Berle and many others who worked with him believed. Actress Ruth Gordon stated in a New York Times article that he was "as virile as anybody virile." There is no existing record of a lover of either sex, though stories did abound.

== Later years and death ==
Eltinge was one of many show-business figures to be hit hard by the 1929 stock market crash. By the 1930s, the female impersonations that he had built his career on had begun to lose popularity, as did vaudeville in general. Eltinge resorted to performing in nightclubs. Crackdowns on cross-dressing in public – an attempt to curb homosexual activity – prevented Eltinge from performing in costume.

On February 25, 1941, Eltinge fell ill while performing at Billy Rose's Diamond Horseshoe nightclub in New York City. He was taken home and died in his apartment ten days later on March 7. His death certificate lists the cause of death as a cerebral hemorrhage.

== See also ==
- Bothwell Browne
- Karyl Norman
- Bert Savoy
- Andrew Tribble
