= Gene Malin =

Actor, emcee, drag performer (1908–1933)

- Malin in Arizona to Broadway, 1933
- Born: Victor Eugene James Malinovsky; June 30, 1908; Brooklyn, New York, U.S.
- Died: August 10, 1933 (aged 25); Venice, Los Angeles, California, U.S.
- Resting place: Most Holy Trinity Cemetery
- Other names: Jean Malin; Imogene Wilson
- Occupations: Actor; emcee; drag performer
- Spouse: Lucille Heiman (m. 1931–1933)

Gene Malin (born Victor Eugene James Malinovsky; June 30, 1908 – August 10, 1933), also known by stage names Jean Malin and Imogene Wilson, was an American actor, emcee, and drag performer during the Jazz Age. He was one of the first openly gay performers in Prohibition-era Speakeasy culture.

== Early life ==
Malin was born Victor Eugene James Malinovsky in Brooklyn, New York on June 30, 1908. He had two sisters and two brothers, one of whom worked for a sugar refinery and one who became a police officer.

As a child, Malin attended P.S. 50 in Brooklyn and then went on to Eastern District High School. As a teenager, he was already winning prizes for his costumes at the elaborate Manhattan drag balls of the 1920s. By his late teens, Malin had worked as a chorus boy in several Broadway shows including Princess Flavor, Miami, and Sisters of the Chorus. Around the same period, Malin worked at several Greenwich Village clubs as a drag performer, most notably the Rubaiyat.

== Career ==
In the spring of 1930, Malin became the headline act at Louis Schwartz's elegant Club Abbey at 46th Street and 8th Avenue in New York City. Although Malin was at times assisted by Helen Morgan, Jr. (Francis Dunn) and Lestra LaMonte (the paper-gown-wearing Lester LaMonte), popular drag artists of the day, he did not appear in female attire (other sources, however, state that he impersonated Gloria Swanson and Theda Bara). The crux of Malin's act was not to impersonate women, but to appear as a flamboyant, effeminate, openly gay male wearing a tuxedo; William Randolph Hearst newspapers' Broadway columnist Louis Sobol described Malin as "a baby-faced lad who lisped and pressed his fingers into his thighs" during performances while another observer called him "a brilliant entertainer, a very funny guy, but risqué".

Malin moved on stage and amongst the audience members as an elegant, witty, wisecracking emcee, affecting a broad exaggerated swishing image associated with the "Pansy acts" that followed. In doing so, Malin and other such performers as Karyl Norman and Ray Bourbon ignited a "Pansy Craze" in New York's speakeasies and later in other cities as well. (He once punched a disruptive patron during a performance, prompting Ed Sullivan to write, "Jean Malin belted a heckler last night at one of the local clubs. All that twitters isn't pansy.") One theatrical publication, Broadway Brevities, declared "the pansies hailed La Malin as their queen", and Vanity Fair magazine published a caricature of the celebrated Malin in 1931. Among his fans was actress Ginger Rogers and he was the frequent escort of actress Polly Moran.

Malin reportedly was the highest-paid nightclub entertainer of 1930, "a six-foot-tall, 200-pound bruiser who also had an attitude and a lisp". He also appeared in Broadway productions such as Sisters of the Chorus (1930) and The Crooner (1932).

After headlining numerous New York clubs such as Paul and Joe's, Malin took his act to Boston and ultimately, in the fall of 1932, to the West Coast, where he was employed at popular nightclubs such as the Ship Café in Venice. He also performed at a club that bore his name. While in Hollywood, he appeared in Arizona to Broadway (1933); in the movie, he portrayed Ray Best, a female impersonator who dressed in the manner of Mae West and sang "Frankie and Johnny". Malin was cast in a third movie, Double Harness (1933), but his performance was discarded and he was replaced by a less effeminate actor; the president of RKO Pictures, B. B. Kahane, disgusted by Malin's flamboyance, noted, "I do not think we ought to have this man on the lot on any picture—shorts or features."

Malin also recorded at least two songs, "I'd Rather be Spanish than Mannish" and "That's What's the Matter With Me".

== Personal life ==
Despite being gay, Malin married former showgirl Lucille Heiman/Helman in New York City in January 1931. Malin and Heiman had known each other from his days performing in drag at the Rubaiyat. Malin filed for divorce in Mexico in November 1932. At the time of his death, the couple still were married.

Between 1936 and 1943, Malin's widow served stints in prison for operating high priced brothels (which the press called "exclusive call houses") on Central Park West, Park Avenue, and 57th Street and for violating the Mann Act.

== Death ==
In the early hours of August 10, 1933, Malin was involved in a fatal automobile accident. He had just performed a "farewell performance" at the Ship Café in Venice, Los Angeles. He piled into his sedan with Jimmy Forlenza (newspapers referred to Forlenza as Malin's "close friend") and comedic actress Patsy Kelly. Malin apparently confused the gears, and the car lurched in reverse and went off a pier into the water. Pinned under the steering wheel, Malin was killed instantly; Forlenza sustained a broken collarbone and severe bruising, and Kelly suffered from shock and serious injuries from the submersion in the water.

Malin's funeral was held on August 17 at St. Mary's Queen of the Angels Church in Brooklyn, New York. He is buried at Most Holy Trinity Cemetery in Brooklyn.

== See also ==
- Victor Victoria
