= Gay ball =

A gay ball may refer to:

- A cross-dressing ball, especially one whose participants are gay men
- Ball culture, an LGBT Black and Latino American offshoot of the earlier cross-dressing balls, initially based in New York City
