= Pansy Craze =

Period of increased LGBT visibility (1920s to 1930s)

- late-1920s–mid-1930s
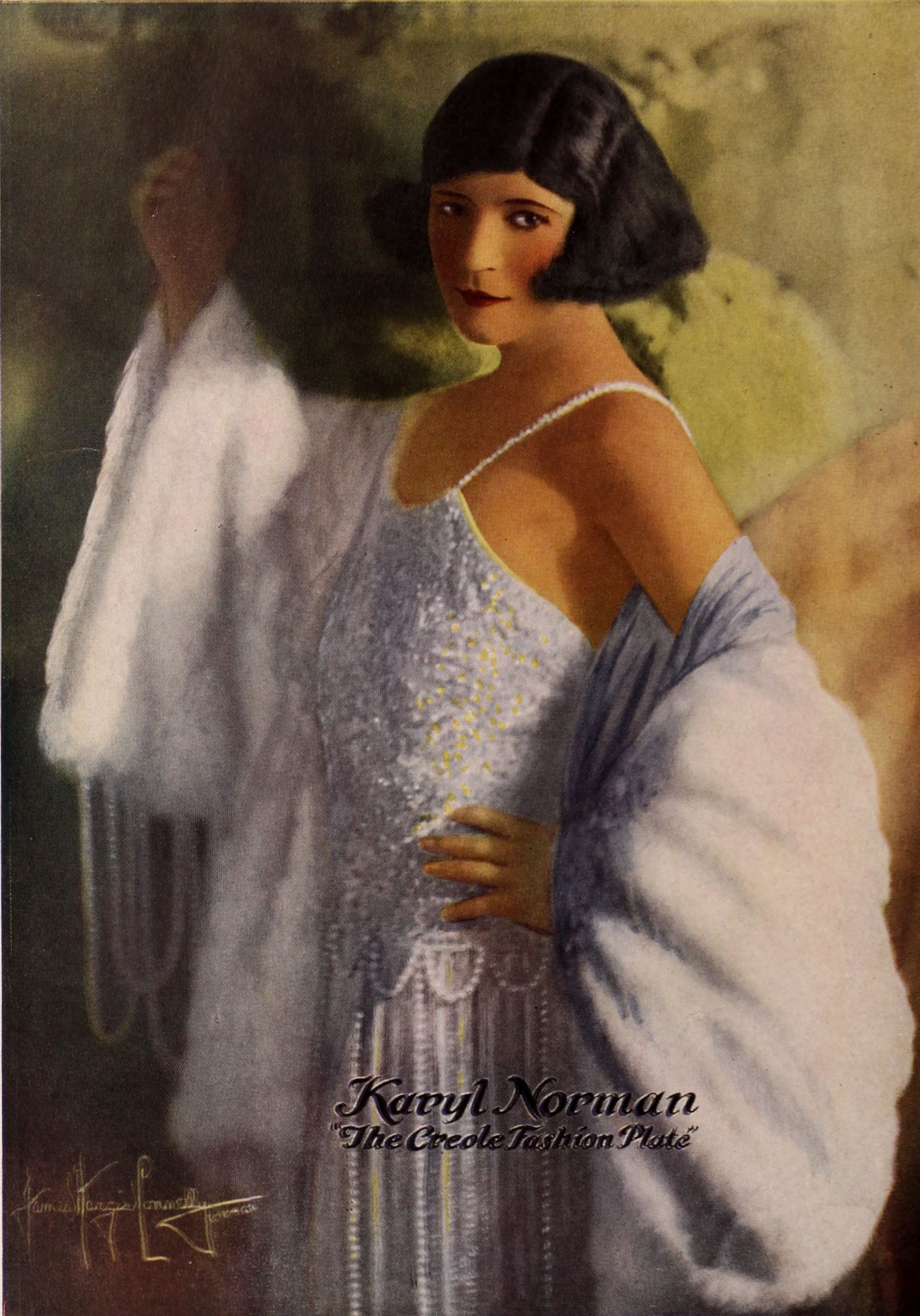
- Painting of "pansy" performer Karyl Norman, titled The Creole Fashion Plate (1923)
- Location: Mainly the United States; Chicago; Los Angeles; New York City; San Francisco
- Leader(s): Gene Malin; Karyl Norman; Ray Bourbon

The Pansy Craze was a period of increased LGBTQ visibility in American popular culture from the late 1920s until the mid-1930s. During the "craze," drag queens — known as "pansy performers" — experienced a surge in underground popularity, especially in New York City, Chicago, Los Angeles, and San Francisco. The exact dates of the movement are debated, with a range from the late 1920s until 1935.

The term "pansy craze" was not used contemporaneously during the era, and was coined decades later by the historian George Chauncey in his 1994 book Gay New York.

== The Craze ==
New York's first drag balls were held in Harlem's Hamilton Lodge in 1869.

In the 1920s, female impersonators were hired to perform at cabarets and speakeasies in many major cities, including New York, Paris, London, Berlin, and San Francisco. The target audience was straight, which gave the performers broader social acceptance.

Gene Malin — known as the "Queen of the Pansy Craze" — achieved relative mainstream success, appearing in both Hollywood films and Broadway shows. Malin worked primarily in New York City in the early 1930s; however, his career was cut short when he died in an automobile accident at the age of 25.

Other stars during the Pansy Craze included Karyl Norman and Ray Bourbon, as well as the gay pianist and singer Bruz Fletcher, who gained fame in Los Angeles during the Pansy Craze.

== End of the era ==
Beginning in late-1933 and escalating throughout the first half of 1934, American Roman Catholics launched a campaign against what they deemed the immorality of American cinema. This led to restrictions in the public visibility of homosexuality through the Hays Code. Police simultaneously began strict crackdowns on the public presence of homosexuals during the Great Depression, as calls for politicians to "clean up" downtown nightlife came from progressive reformers.

== Legacy ==
Some scholars have argued that the Pansy Craze broadened the range of acceptable behaviors for men, even though restrictions on gender conformity and LGBTQ visibility were tightened after this period. In later decades, drag queens such as Divine and RuPaul again starred in Hollywood films, and performers such as Jinkx Monsoon appeared on Broadway.

== See also ==
- Gay Nineties
- List of drag queens
- Portland vice scandal
