= Karyl Norman =

American singer, female impersonator, and vaudeville performer

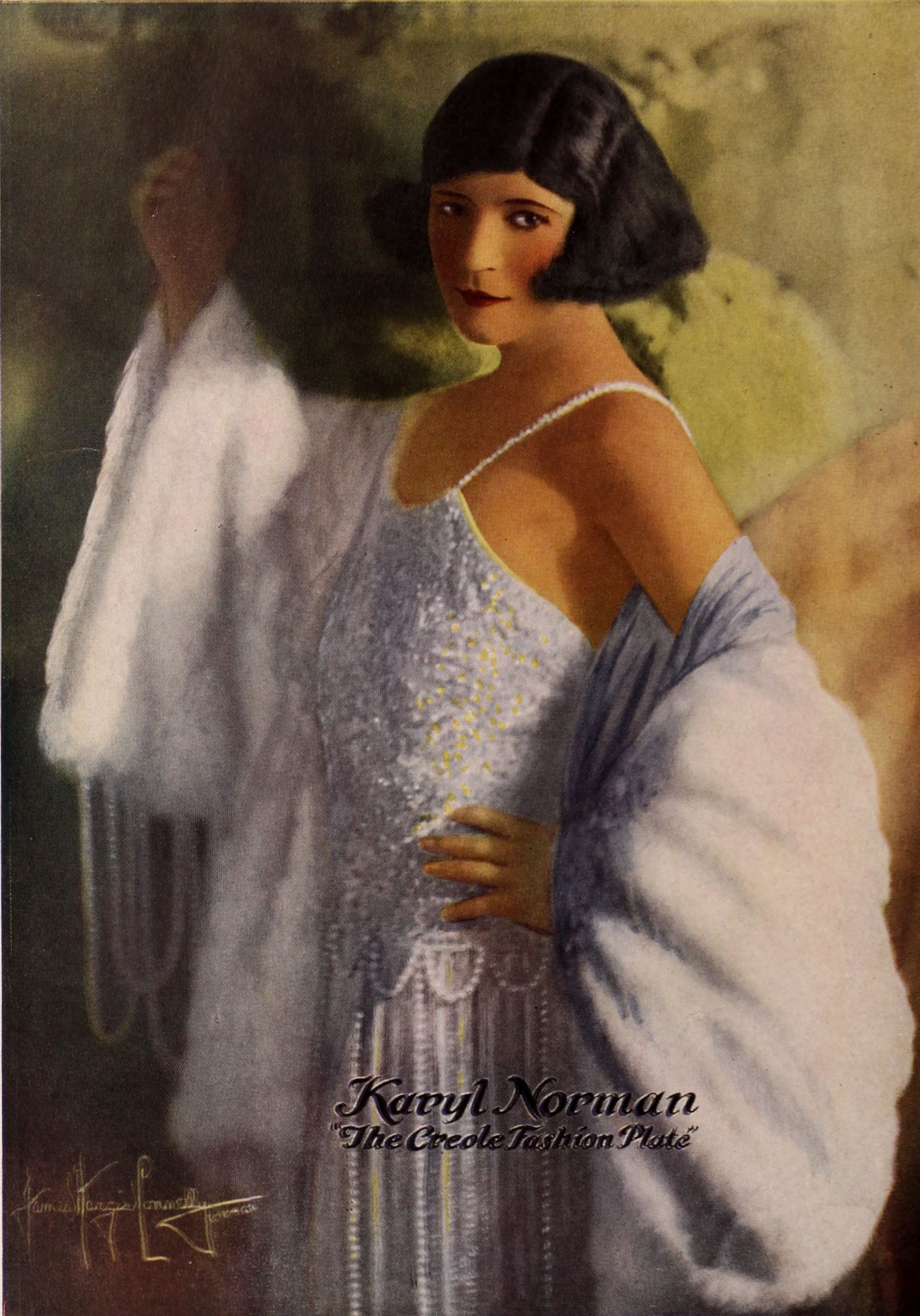
Karyl Norman, c. 1923

George Francis Peduzzi (June 13, 1897 – August 25, 1947), known professionally as Karyl Norman, was an American female impersonator who was popular in vaudeville, nightclubs, and on Broadway in the 1920s.

== Biography ==
Norman was born in Baltimore, Maryland on June 13, 1897 to Mary and Norman Augusta Peduzzi. He left home at the age of 16, joined Neil O'Brien's Minstrels and began performing vaudeville on the US West Coast. In 1917, he traveled to Australia as a theatrical performer. He took the name Karyl because it was sexless, and Norman after his father.

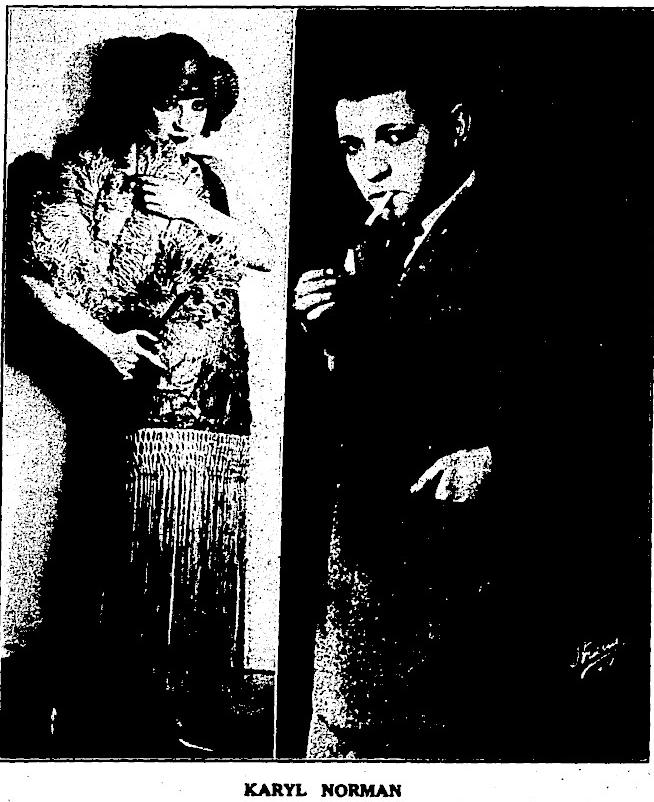
Karyl Norman in the New York Clipper, June 22, 1921.

Norman billed himself as "The Creole Fashion Plate". He was known for his gowns, mostly made by his mother, with whom he traveled. He made his New York City debut as a female impersonator in May 1919 and was an immediate success. He specialized in Southern songs and was known for his quick changes of clothes and gender. One critic wrote: "Not only does this impersonator wear his feminine toggery in tiptop shape, but has a voice that fools 'em at the start. Then to a lower register he descends - a lusty masculine voice....". He wrote many of his songs, including "Nobody Lied (When They Said That I Cried Over You)," "Beside a Babbling Brook," and "I’m Through (Shedding Tears Over You)."

As well as performing in vaudeville, Norman appeared in many stage plays and musical comedies. He also toured in Britain, Europe, Australia, New Zealand, and South Africa. In New York, he appeared in the Palace Theatre on Broadway in 1923, starred in the Greenwich Village Follies of 1924, and Lady Do in 1927, and headlined at the Palace Theatre in 1930 in an act called "Glorifying the American Boy-Girl." With Gene Malin, Ray Bourbon, and others, he instigated the "Pansy Craze" for drag acts in New York in 1930. The actress Fifi D'Orsay described Norman as "...a great performer... a wonderful guy, beloved and respected by everybody, although he was a gay boy... it was harder for them than it is today. He did an act with two pianos and those gorgeous clothes. He had such class, and he was so divine.".

During the 1930s, his popularity diminished, but he continued to perform. In 1942, he put on an All American Male Revue, starring Niles Marsh, at the Castle Farms Night Club in Lima, Ohio. When his mother died in 1938, he vowed to retire but didn't. He reportedly worked at Detroit’s Club Frontenac in 1940, and toured Australia in 1946. Shortly before he died in 1947, Norman accepted a job at the Ha Ha Club in Hollywood, FL.

== Personal life ==
In 1922, Norman was involved in a widely publicized dispute with vaudeville performer Ruth Budd Carpenter. Newspaper accounts state the couple agreed to marry, but Norman broke off the engagement. He supposedly was miffed that Carpenter would not allow his mother to attend their honeymoon even though Carpenter planned to bring her mother along. Carpenter promptly sued Norman for breach of contract.

It is said a former FBI agent claimed Norman was arrested in Detroit on a morals charge during the 1930s. "He would have been deported but for the intervention of Eleanor Roosevelt," said the agent. "Seems he had done a benefit for some charity she was interested in, and she ‘owed him one.’"

== Death ==
Norman died in Hollywood, Florida, on August 25, 1947, at the age of 50.

== See also ==
- Julian Eltinge
- Bothwell Browne
- Bert Savoy
