= Niles Marsh =

Singer and female impersonator

Niles Marsh was a female impersonator who began his career on the Broadway stage and then, from the early 1920s to the mid-1940s, rose to become one of the best known drag performers on the American vaudeville and nightclub circuits. He was one of many such artists who, during that period, encapsulated what was known as the Pansy Craze.

== Performing career ==
=== On Broadway ===
According to a programme biography from the 1940s, Niles Marsh "was a child prodigy and started his career as a boy soprano, touring for four years". A producer who heard him sing immediately cast him in a Broadway show, playing a female role. From a show biography, Marsh subsequently performed several seasons on Broadway.

=== Vaudeville Circuit ===
By the 1920s, Marsh had become a performer on the lucrative vaudeville circuit. Typical of his early appearance was one that opened at the Strand Theater in Modesto, California, on January 1, 1924. One of four acts to perform in a continuous show from 2pm to 11pm, Marsh was singled out by the local press as "the one which is going to prove a real sensation... This act has a great volume of scenery and changes costume several times. Niles Marsh will prove one of the cleverest acts to visit Modesto in some time". He performed at the same venue again a year later, in March 1925, in what was billed as "a novel surprise." In July 1927, Marsh appeared at the Liberty Theatre in Benton Harbor, Michigan, in a dance revue entitled Stepping Along. As the local press noted, he and another artiste, Doral Mack, "impersonate flappers in a highly diverting comedy number in which these fashion pirates offer singing and dancing of the highest type."

According to his biography, Marsh toured the vaudeville circuit in United States and also its equivalents in Australia, England and Africa. His Australian tour is known to have taken place during 1929, where he appeared for several months at Melbourne's Tivoli Theatre. Credited as a female impersonator, Marsh first performed there on June 22, 1929, alongside English comedian Jack Edge, film actor Horace Kenney, and ventriloquists David Poole and Johnny Green. A month later, he participated in a special farewell season at the same venue, when he was billed as "an experiment in femininity." Marsh appeared at the Tivoli again in September, as part of a revue entitled The Vanities, impersonating the Italian opera singer Amelita Galli-Curci.

Returning to the United States, Marsh continued to perform on the vaudeville circuit (and especially the Orpheum Circuit) despite the fact that, after the advent of talkies in 1929, the popularity of live variety theater was starting to decline. Nevertheless, he still made regular live appearances, often as the opening act before a feature film. During this period, Marsh is known to have appeared at:

- Capitol Theater, Hartford, Connecticut (April 1931; described as "a none-too-serious feminine impersonator")
- Orpheum Theater, Oakland, California (December 1931),
- Warner Brothers Theater, Fresno, California (April 1933; billed as "America's well-known travesty artist"),
- Orpheum Theater, Salt Lake City, Utah (September 1933),
- Wilshire Ebell Theater, Los Angeles (December 1934).

By his own account, Marsh also spent five years as a regular performer at the De Luxe Picture Theater in New York City.

=== Nightclub Appearances ===
By the mid-1930s, vaudeville was effectively dead, so Marsh turned to the booming nightclub industry, which had burgeoned following the end of Prohibition. In 1935, he headlined the gala floor show at the Blue Ribbon Night Club in Albuquerque, New Mexico, where he was described as "America's foremost female impersonator, presenting his famous impressions in dazzling gowns." During a subsequent nightclub appearance, Marsh was seen by Mrs. Eve Finocchio, wife of the proprietor of a new drag nightclub Finocchio's Club in San Francisco, which had recently opened in June 1936. Marsh was soon signed as a regular performer at Finnochio's and remained "one of the highlights of the show" for at least the next eight years.

During this period, Marsh also appeared in other nightclubs around the country. In August 1942, billed as "vaudeville's greatest satirical artist," he headlined Karyl Norman's All American Male Revue at the Castle Farms Night Club in Lima, Ohio.

== Later life ==
Virtually nothing is known of Niles Marsh's later life.

In the early 1980s, Blue Pear Records, a Florida-based record label that specialised in cast recordings from obscure Broadway and off-Broadway musicals from the 1960s, released a series of theatre-related LPs with liner notes attributed to Niles Marsh (or someone using his name). In a 1987 article in the Los Angeles Daily News, this Niles Marsh, described as a "theatre historian and record annotator" expressed his dissatisfaction with the then-popular fad of using well-known opera singers to make new cast recordings of classic stage musicals such as My Fair Lady and West Side Story.
