= Arizona to Broadway =

1933 film

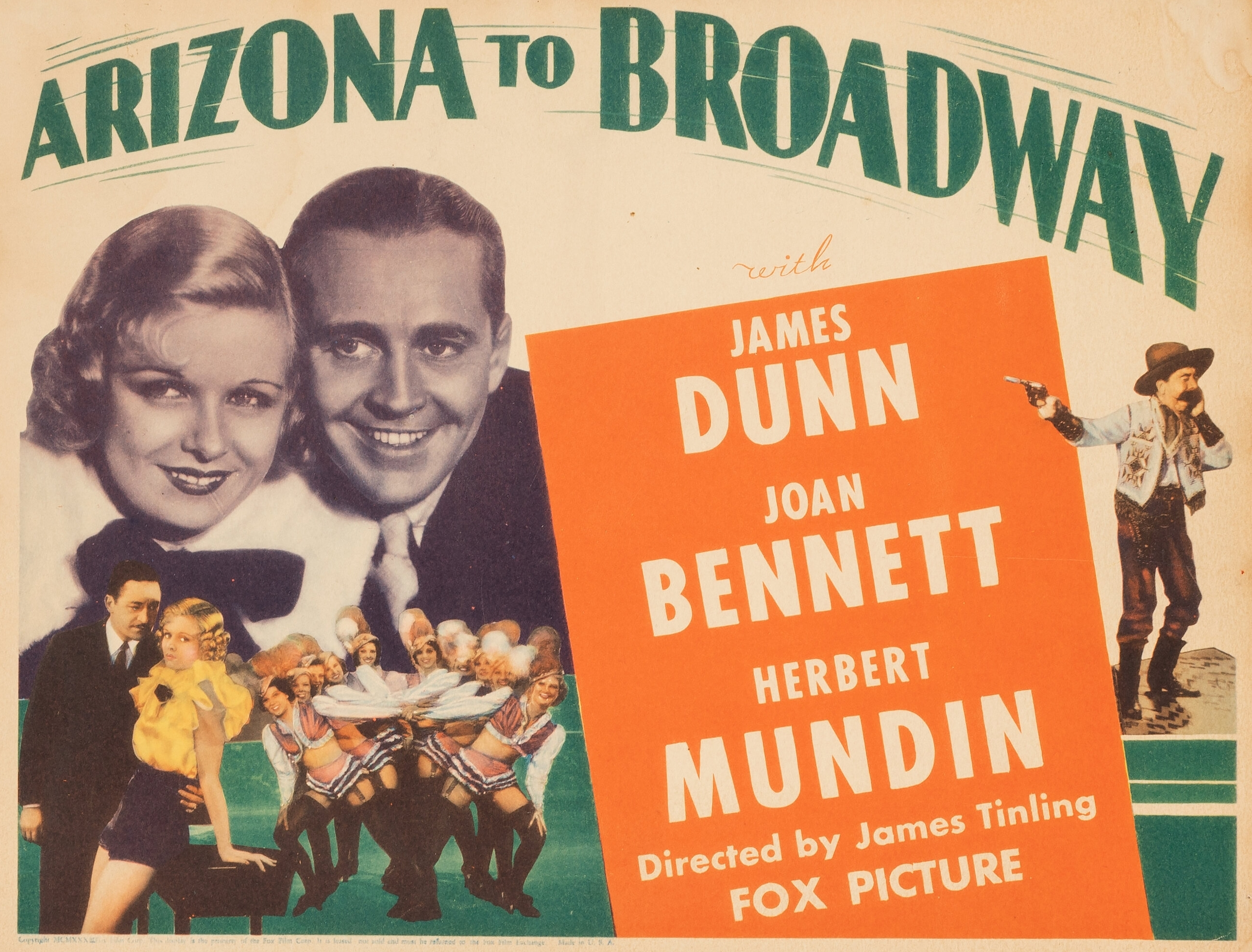
- Lobby Card
- Directed by: James Tinling
- Written by: William M. Conselman; Henry Johnson
- Starring: James Dunn; Joan Bennett; Herbert Mundin; Gene Malin
- Cinematography: George Schneiderman
- Edited by: Louis R. Loeffler
- Music by: Arthur Lange; Glen Knight; Paul Van Loan
- Distributed by: Fox Film Corporation
- Release date: July 22, 1933
- Running time: 66 minutes
- Country: United States
- Language: English

Arizona to Broadway is a 1933 American pre-Code crime romance film directed by James Tinling and starring James Dunn and Joan Bennett. It was made by Fox Film Corporation. The screenplay was written by William M. Conselman and Henry Johnson.

It was reworked ten years later into Jitterbugs, one of Laurel and Hardy's features made at 20th Century Fox in the 1940s.

Promotional material for the film

== Cast ==
(in credits order)

- James Dunn as Smiley Wells
- Joan Bennett as Lynn Martin
- Herbert Mundin as Kingfish Miller
- Sammy Cohen as Morris Blitz
- Theodore von Eltz as Hubert Wayne
- Merna Kennedy as Flo Sandberg
- Earle Foxe as John Sandburg
- Dave Wengren as Ambrose
- J. Carrol Naish as Tommy Monk
- Max Wagner as Pete
- Walter Catlett as Ned Flynn
- Jerry Lester as Jimmy Dante
- Jean Malin as Ray Best (uncredited)
