= Hamilton Lodge Ball =

Cross-dressing ball in Harlem, New York

- Magazine coverage of the Hamilton Lodge Ball, showing what were described as three female impersonators
- Date: 1869–1937
- Venue: Rockland Palace
- Location: 280 West 155th Street and Frederick Douglass Avenues, New York, NY, USA; 40°49′44.12″N 73°56′13.67″W
- Type: annual cross-dressing ball
- Organised by: Hamilton Lodge No. 710 of the Grand United Order of Odd Fellows in America

The Hamilton Lodge Ball, also known as the Masquerade and Civic Ball, was an annual cross-dressing ball in Harlem, United States. The Lodge's ball in 1869 was recognized as the first drag ball in United States history. The Hamilton Lodge Ball reached the peak of its popularity in the 1920s and early 1930s, as the Harlem Renaissance and Pansy Craze drew wealthy white New Yorkers and celebrities into Harlem nightlife. The Hamilton Lodge Ball drew hundreds of drag performers and thousands of spectators from diverse racial and socioeconomic backgrounds. While the Hamilton Ball was a rare scene of interracial nightlife, many of the performers were young, working class black men and women. Despite the unifying quality of the event that drew crowds across age, gender, race, and class, class divisions were apparent as performers were often less affluent than their wealthier elite audiences. The balls featured a pageant contest in which drag performers competed for cash prizes. Prizes were awarded for most accurate cross dressing performance as well as best attire.

== 19th century ==
In 1842, the Philomathean Institute, a fraternal organization of free Black men, petitioned the Independent Order of Odd Fellows to grant them a charter but were denied due to their race. Peter Ogden (founder), a Black sailor and member of the British Grand United Order of Odd fellows helped the men to gain a charter from the British organization which did not discriminate by race forming the Philomathean Lodge, No. 646 in New York City in 1843. Grand United Order of Odd Fellows in America was born. The following year, Hamilton Lodge, No. 710, was established in February 1844 in Harlem. In 1869, for the Lodge's 25th anniversary, their first annual Masquerade and Civic Ball was held at the Rockland Palace Banquet Hall & Casino. This is the first recorded ball in Harlem where men dressed as women, and it is believed to be the first drag ball in the United States.

The balls grew in size, and in a March 1886 article, the New York Freeman described the Hamilton Lodge Ball as "the event of the season." Around this same time, drag balls gained popularity in other cities in the United States, including balls in Washington D.C. organized by William Dorsey Swann. According to historian Michael Henry Adams, the balls were originally organized by straight men; however, they became a way for non-straight people to appear publicly in drag.

== Early 1900s ==
As the drag balls grew in popularity, demands emerged to investigate possible violations of public immorality. In New York City, the Committee of Fourteen investigated the balls, releasing a report in 1916 describing scenes of "male perverts" who looked like women. Nevertheless, these "Faggots Balls" or "Fairies Balls" continued, and prizes would even be given to the "most perfect feminine body displayed by an impersonator." The balls in New York City drew people from all over the United States.

== 1920s ==
In the 1920s during the Prohibition Era, Harlem underwent a cultural revitalization as the Harlem Renaissance marked an upsurge in arts, literature, and culture. The “Great Migration” of African Americans from rural to urban areas contributed to this growth of the Harlem Renaissance, paralleling the increase in popularity of Harlem’s drag ballroom culture. At the same time, the Pansy Craze in New York created popular interest in drag performances. As a result of these two cultural phenomena, the Hamilton Lodge Ball dramatically increased in popularity, attracting up to 8,000 dancers and spectators at the peak of its popularity. In 1923, the ball attracted seven hundred attendees, a number that grew tenfold by 1929. The Hamilton Lodge Ball became so popular that they often had to turn away spectators. In 1929, it was estimated that two thousand people were turned away.

The poet Langston Hughes wrote, "During the height of the New Negro era and the tourist invasion of Harlem, it was fashionable for the intelligentsia and the social leaders of both Harlem and the downtown area to occupy boxes at this ball and look down from above at the queerly assorted throng on the dancing floor." The balls were racially integrated, and though New York State law criminalized cross-dressing, police officers worked at the balls to arrest any troublemakers.

Chad Heap, a history professor at George Washington University, stated, "It's pretty amazing just how widespread these balls were. Almost every newspaper article about them lists 20 to 30 well-known people of the day who were in attendance as spectators. It was a widely integrated part of life in the 1920s and 30s." Contemporaneous news accounts described Hamilton Lodge Ball as a "Scene of Splendor," with quotes such as, "The masculine women and feminine men, how are you going to tell the roosters from the hens?"

The prominence of queer communities in Harlem is indicated by the presence of queer writers, artists, and composers central to the Harlem Renaissance, such as Langston Hughes, Alain Locke, Countee Cullen, Claude McKay, Wallace Thurman, Augustus Granville Dill, Richmond Barthe, Richard Bruce Nugent, and Porter Grainger.

== 1930s ==
In the mid-1930s, a heavy backlash against LGBT people occurred during the Great Depression. The NYPD, which officiated the balls in the 1920s, began arresting participants for indecency, vagrancy, and female impersonation in the mid-1930s. As the cultural reaction against LGBT visibility grew, a sex-crime panic emerged, and gay men and lesbians were seen as dangerous to society. Despite this, the 1936 ball had roughly 5500 attendees.

The Harlem Lodge held its final ball on February 26, 1937, described as "a grand jamboree of dancing, lovemaking, display, rivalry, drinking, and advertisement." About 1000 people (of the roughly 5000 attendees) competed in the costume contest. The following year the Hamilton Lodge Ball ended, described by The New York Age with the headline "Fifteen Arrested By Police as 'Fairies' Turn 'Em On."

== Criticism ==
Criticism of the balls aligned with exclusion of queer black communities from the civil rights movement. In an effort to make the civil rights movement more aligned with social norms, Adam Clayton Powell Sr. criticized homosexuality in his sermon, claiming it to be the cause of the prioritization of the individual over the community's wellbeing. Despite efforts to disaggregate black queer communities from the civil rights movement, the Hamilton Lodge Ball continued to grow in popularity. Because of the backlash and overall controversy of the ball, lodge members distinguished themselves from their sponsorship of the ball, as well as making efforts to diversify the crowds they attracted.

Despite critique of queer communities by prominent civil rights leaders like Powell, black newspapers published praise for the Hamilton Ball. The New York Age called it “a treat that shall never be forgotten”, and the Amsterdam News commented on the “most gorgeous of feminine attire” and the “sheer magnificence” of the clothing. One columnist for Amsterdam News, Roi Ottley, wrote “of the contestants were some luscious-looking wenches . . . Others were gloriously clad . . . Many pranced like thoroughbred women . . . Every one of them was notoriously effeminate."
