= George Chauncey =

American author and professor

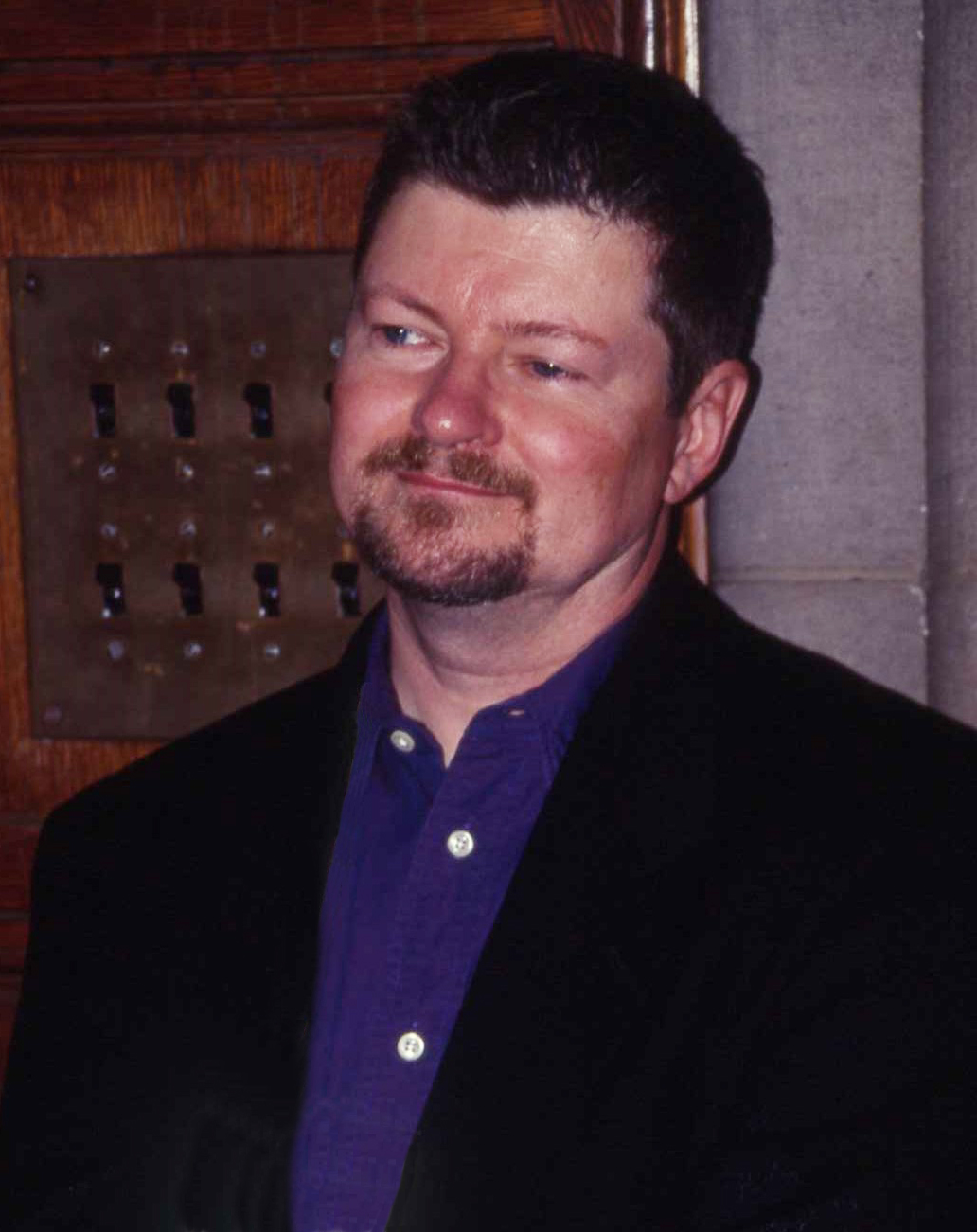
George Chauncey at "The Future of the Queer Past" conference at the University of Chicago in 2000

George Chauncey (born 1954) is a professor of history at Columbia University. He is best known as the author of Gay New York: Gender, Urban Culture, and the Making of the Gay Male World, 1890–1940, wherein he coined the term "Pansy Craze."

== Academic career ==
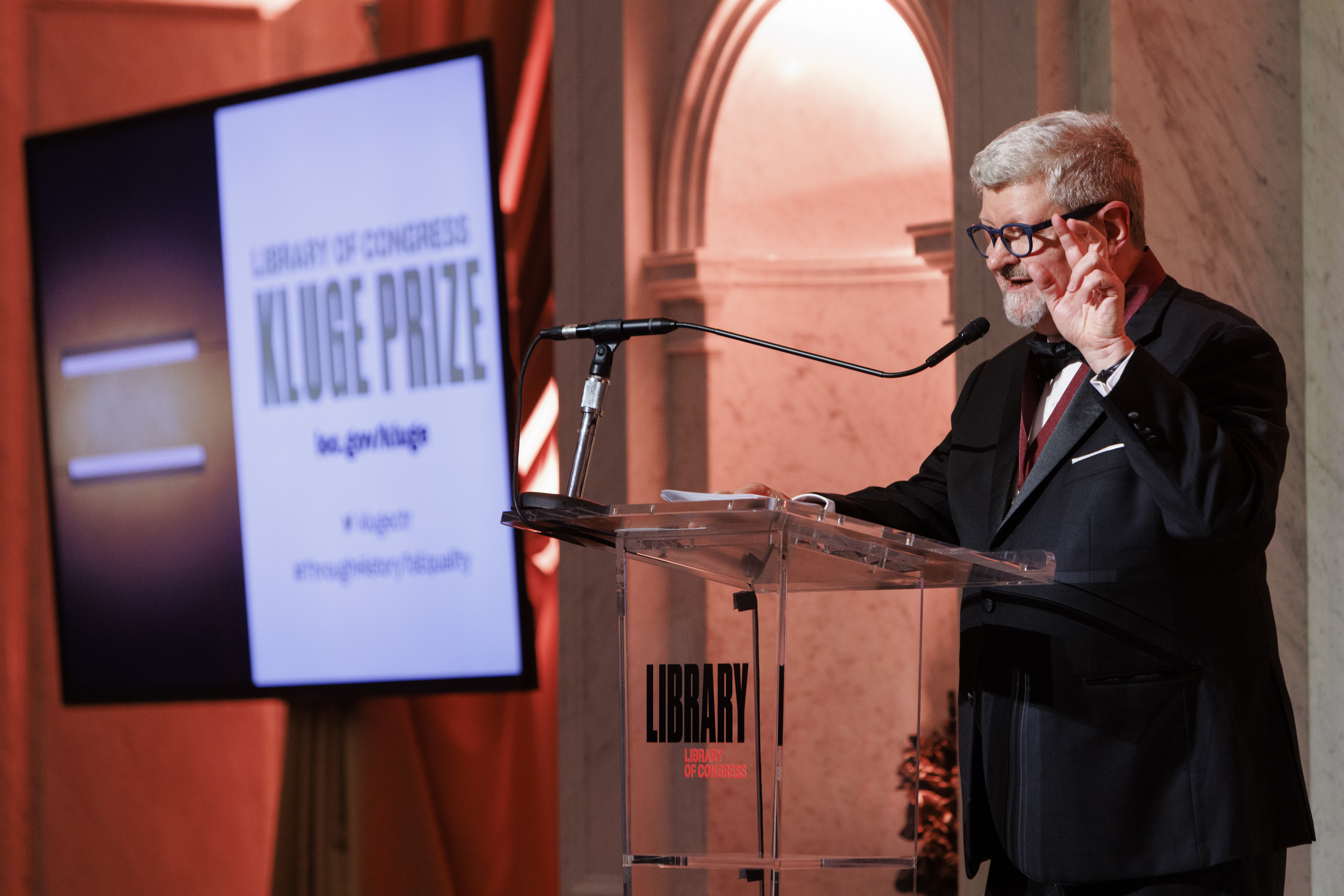
Chauncey speaking in 2022

Chauncey received his bachelor's degree in 1977 in history and his Ph.D. in 1989 in history from Yale University, where he studied with Nancy Cott and David Montgomery. His dissertation was later published as his book Gay New York. From 1991–2006, he taught in the Department of History at the University of Chicago, going from assistant professor to full professor of history. In 2006, he joined the Yale faculty. He subsequently joined Columbia University's Department of History in 2017. Chauncey was the director of the Columbia Research Initiative on the Global History of Sexualities, focusing on literature that researched gender and sexuality.

In 1992, Chauncey spent time serving on the American Council of Learned Societies, a non-profit organization that provides fellowships and scholarships for young aspiring students in history and other educational fields. In 1996 Chauncey also spent time serving on the National Humanities Center, a non-profit organization that focuses on building the study of humanities at a national level.

Chauncey was elected to serve as a member of both Society of American Historians in 2005, and later to the New York Academy of History in 2007.

In his later years, Chauncey spent time working as a consultant on historical research projects as well as lecture series in New York City and Chicago.

== Writing ==
Chauncey’s book Gay New York: Gender, Urban Culture, and the Making of the Gay Male World, 1890–1940 was published in 1994 to mark the twenty-fifth anniversary of the Stonewall rebellion. It combines social, political, and cultural history. Using newspaper accounts from a wide variety of mainstream and underground publications, the archives of reform organizations, police and court records, popular cartoons and caricatures, guidebooks, and maps, Chauncey argues that early twentieth-century New York had a thriving, open gay culture. According to Chauncey, it was not until the 1930s and afterward that a strict regime of policing gay male sexuality emerged. It was in this period, he contends, that homosexual behavior began to move underground.

The book was acclaimed the Los Angeles Times for its findings that coming out "meant initiation into gay networks" and of the use of house concerts as covers for sexual activity, as well as for originating the term "pansy craze" and for the relative novelty of the category of "closeted" gay men.

Chauncey wrote a historical defense of gay marriage in 2013.

In the 1990s he conducted interviews and collected material for a history of gay New York from the mid-twentieth century to the present. This work has yet to be published.

== Recognition ==
In 1989, Chauncey received the Samuel Golieb Fellowship in Legal History from the New York University School of Law. This fellowship awards young law students and historians research support to help fund their projects and literature work.

In 1997, Chauncey was the recipient of the Sprague-Todes Literary Award, which rewards authors who create a powerful piece of work on LGBTQ+ history, for his book Gay New York.

In 2000, during his time teaching at Yale University, Chauncey was the recipient of the first James Brudner Memorial Award in Lesbian and Gay Studies.

In 2004, Chauncey received a Community Service Award from the Lesbian Community Cancer Project in Chicago for his work in offering support and one-on-one conversations with lesbian women battling cancer.

In 2022, Chauncey was awarded the John W. Kluge Prize for the Study of Humanity. He is the first scholar of LGBTQ+ history to be awarded the accolade.

== Expert testimony ==
Chauncey has testified as an expert witness in over thirty major gay rights cases, and was the organizer and lead author of a historians' amicus brief in Lawrence v. Texas (2003), which weighed heavily in the Supreme Court's landmark decision overturning the nation's remaining sodomy laws. In that brief, Chauncey argued for the historical specificity of understandings of sodomy, challenging the reasoning in Bowers v. Hardwick (1986) that anti-sodomy laws were an enduring feature of the American legal system.

Chauncey testified as an expert witness in the California Proposition 8 case Perry v. Schwarzenegger on behalf of the successful plaintiffs. The decision cited Chauncey's testimony on several questions of law that were relevant to the case.

Chauncey also served as an expert witness in Romer v. Evans on May 20, 1996 in the state of Colorado. Voters in Colorado had approved an amendment to Article II of the Colorado Constitution, which discriminated against members of the LGBTQ+ community by preventing them from receiving judicial or legislative protection from the federal government. A gay civil rights movement ensued, and members of the LGBTQ+ community won the trial against the state of Colorado in a 6–3 decision. It was determined that the Second Amendment was discriminatory against a certain group, therefore causing the supreme court to overturn the ruling.

== Personal life ==
Chauncey married film scholar Ronald Gregg in 2014.

== Works ==
- Gay New York: Gender, Urban Culture, and the Making of the Gay Male World, 1890–1940. Basic Books, 1994. ISBN 0-465-02621-4
- Why Marriage? The History Shaping Today's Debate Over Gay Equality. Basic Books, 2005. ISBN 0-465-00958-1
