= Gay New York =

1994 history book

- Author: George Chauncey
- Subject: Gay history, history of New York City
- Publisher: Basic Books
- Publication date: 1994
- Pages: 478
- ISBN: 9780786723355

Gay New York: Gender, Urban Culture, and the Making of the Gay Male World, 1890–1940 is a 1994 history book by George Chauncey about gay life in New York City during the early 20th century. An updated 2019 edition commemorates the Stonewall Rebellion's 50th anniversary.

== See also ==
- LGBT culture in New York City
