= Ray Bourbon =

American female impersonator

- Bourbon in 1956
- Born: Hallie Board Waddell; August 11, 1902; Texarkana, Texas, U.S.
- Died: July 19, 1971 (aged 68); Brownwood, Texas
- Other names: Rae Bourbon; Hal Waddell; Hal Hughes; Richard Mann; Ramón Ícarez
- Occupations: Vaudeville entertainer, female impersonator
- Years active: 1913–1960s

Ray (or Rae) Bourbon (born Hallie Board Waddell; August 11, 1902 – July 19, 1971) was an American female impersonator, entertainer and vaudeville performer, noted for his "outrageous" risqué monologues. He mainly performed in nightclubs, gaining a following in the 1930s and 1940s, and issued several LPs of comic material during the 1950s. He died while serving a prison sentence, having been convicted of being an accomplice to murder.

== Early life ==
Many details of Rae's life are disputed, as he had something of an unreliable narrator reputation — one who told many outrageous stories during his life. One friend stated: "Where Ray was concerned, we simply never knew what was real and what wasn't." Research published in 2021 indicates that he was born in Texarkana on August 11, 1902 as Hallie Board Waddell. He was also known as Hal Wadell (or Waddell), Hal Hughes, Richard Mann, Ramón Ícarez among others. Rae usually claimed this birth date, but FBI sources state that he once claimed that his birth was in 1892. In a 1937 application for a Social Security card, he gave his birth name as Hal Wadell, but at different times in his life claimed that he was the illegitimate son of a Texas congressman and/or that he was the "last of the Habsburg Bourbons" whose mother had traveled to the US shortly before giving birth.

The recent research suggests that, after his mother, Elizabeth Waddell (née Wilhelm) remarried, Rae was recorded in the 1910 census as Hallie Hughes, and in 1920 as Hal Hughes, living at both dates in Texarkana. He claimed, apparently falsely, to have attended school in London, and to have first performed on stage there in 1913. According to the FBI, he returned to the US around 1917, married, and had a son, though again this appears to be untrue. Bourbon claimed to have been a stunt double for movie actresses and an uncredited actor in several silent films, notably Rudolph Valentino's Blood and Sand in 1922. Using the name Ramón Ícarez, he may have appeared as a dancer at the opening of the Los Angeles Coliseum in 1923. He also performed in vaudeville as one half of a double act with Bert Sherry and toured the US and England. In 1929, he worked in another double act, Scotch and Bourbon, and in 1931 (as Mr. Rae Bourbon) modeled women's dresses in a department store in Bakersfield, California. After receiving a large inheritance, perhaps as a result of his mother's death in 1929, he then wrote a novel, Hookers, published under the pseudonym of Richard F. Mann.

== Female impersonation ==
By 1932, Rae was working full-time as a female impersonator, headlining "Frisco’s first pansy show", Boys Will Be Girls, in San Francisco in 1933 at Tait’s Café. He became noted for his outrageous material, and was later described as "a professional vulgarian, not to be confused with glamour drag." In the 1930s and 1940s, he appeared in hundreds of gay nightclubs across the US, notably in San Francisco, Los Angeles, and Miami Beach. He performed his own material or songs specially written for him such as "Mr. Wong Has Got The Biggest Tong In China", and occasionally issued recordings, such as Hilarity From Hollywood (c.1945). His accompanists included Chet Forrest and Bart Howard. He put on his show Don’t Call Me Madam: A Midnight Revue in Time at Carnegie Hall in New York City to a sold-out audience. In 1944, he was hired by Mae West to perform in her Broadway production of Catherine Was Great, and her show Diamond Lil which toured until 1950.

== Later life ==
By the early 1950s, Rae increasingly faced prosecution as well as declining sales, and his shows were too risqué for a mainstream audience. He issued a series of spoken word albums on his UTC ("Under The Counter") label, which were available at his performances and by mail order. In Los Angeles, he was arrested on a charge of "impersonating a woman" and the authorities closed down the club in which he was performing on the grounds that it was "presenting an indecent performance." After an arrest in New Orleans in 1956, he claimed to have undertaken a "sex change" gender reassignment operation in Mexico. This was probably untrue and no more than a publicity stunt; he may in fact have undergone an operation for cancer. However, he persistently used the claim in his material and publicity, even releasing an album titled Let Me Tell You About My Operation, and he insisted thereafter on being billed as Rae (rather than Ray) Bourbon.

== Prosecution and death ==
In December 1968, Rae was accused of being an accomplice to murder. He traveled between performances in an old car pulling a trailer containing some 70 pet dogs; after the car broke down, he entrusted their care to a kennel owner in Texas, A. D. Blount. However, when Bourbon failed to pay for the dogs' upkeep, Blount disposed of the dogs, most probably to an animal shelter. Bourbon became convinced that the dogs had simply been killed and he hired two men, Bobby Eugene Chrisco and Randall Craneto, to beat Blount up. Blount was shot once in the chest during the attack and died as a result. Bourbon was arrested 10 days later. He pleaded innocence, but was convicted with the two men and sentenced to a 99-year prison term. Bourbon died in hospital in Brownwood, Texas, while serving his prison sentence in 1971.
