= Cross-dressing ball =

Cross-dressing and homosexuality events

Gay balls, cross-dressing balls, pansy balls, or drag balls were (depending on the place, time, and type) public or private balls that were celebrated mainly in the first third of the 20th century, where cross-dressing and ballroom dancing with same-sex partners was allowed. By the 1900s, the balls had become important cultural events for gays and lesbians, even attracting tourists. Their Golden Age was during the interwar period, mainly in Berlin and Paris, even though they could be found in many big cities in Europe and the Americas, such as Mexico City and New York City.

== Precedents ==
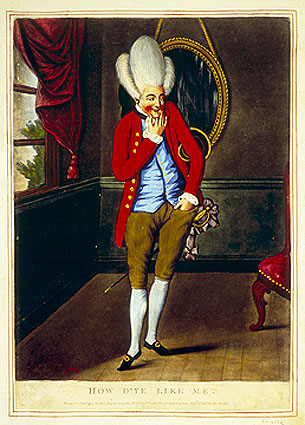
"Molly" or "macaroni" from the 18th century

By the end of the 17th century, a gay subculture is documented in Europe, with cruising areas, bars, parties and balls, cross-dressers, and slang. Scholars like Randolph Trumbach consider it as the moment when gay subculture appeared in Europe. On the contrary, historian Rictor Norton considers unlikely that such a subculture would appear fully formed, and thinks that it was actually the increase in surveillance and police procedures that brought to the surface an underground culture that had not been visible up to that moment.

The archives of the Portuguese Inquisition in Lisbon preserve information of the so-called "danças dos fanchonos" from the beginning of the 17 century. About 1620, the "fachonos", the baroque equivalent of modern drag queens, organized big parties in the Gaia Lisboa, the gay Lisbon. These itinerant celebrations, called "escarramão", or "esparramão", used to include pantomimes with racy scenes, where some of the participants were dressed as women, and other as men. His Majesty's High Court in Mexico City discovered in 1656 a similar case, when Juan Correa, an old man, over 70 years old, confessed that he had been committing the unspeakable vice since his childhood. Correa's house, in the outskirts of the city, had been used as a meeting point to celebrate balls, where many men dressed as women.

Several studies have not found similar phenomena in the judicial cases in Aragon, Catalonia, the Basque Country or Valencia, even though in the Valencian case there are evidences of a subculture and a possible gay ghetto. In Spain, cross-dressing was socially only allowed for carnival, when even those closest to the king could dress as women. On the other hand, in France, during Louis XIV's reign, no ball was complete without cross-dressers.

By the end of the 17th century, there was a completely developed gay subculture in London, with the molly houses used as clubs, where gays met regularly to drink, dance and have fun. These taverns are well known thanks to the Mother Clap's molly house scandal from 1726.

== Cross-dressing balls ==
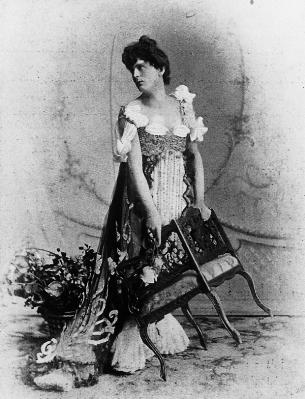
Hermann von Teschenberg (1866–1911) dressed as woman. Teschenberg, a cross-dresser, was one of the founders of the Scientific-Humanitarian Committee.

=== Germany ===
==== The Empire ====
Berlin's clandestine gay underground can be followed up to the 18th century, in spite of the persecution gays were suffering. In Prussia, Paragraph 143 of the penal code, and later the introduction of Paragraph 175 in the German penal code, with other laws for public scandal, and child protection, made the life of gays extremely difficult. In fact, the activities of Magnus Hirschfeld or the first homosexual movement could not avoid the regular police raids and closing of premises in the 1900s. And not just the premises were being watched by the police, in 1883, the moral police had 4799 "transvestite" and transgender woman under vigilance, even though "permits" could be handed out to cross-dressers in cases considered "medical".

It is thus surprising that, beginning mid 19th century, the Urningsball or Tuntenball came to be, balls of uranians, or queens, tolerated, but watched by the police. By the 1900s, these balls had achieved such a fame in Germany, that people from all around the country, and even foreign tourists, would travel to Berlin to participate. These balls were celebrated in large ballrooms, as the Deutscher Kaiser, in the Lothringer Straße, or the Filarmonía, in the Bernburgstraße, the Dresdner Kasino, in the Dresdner Straße, or the Orpheum, in the Alter Jakobstraße 32.

For example, the Berliner Morgenpost described extensively on October 17, 1899, a gay ball that had taken place in the hotel König von Portugal, where balls were still being celebrated in 1918. The ball season used to begin in October and go until Easter, with a frequency of several balls a week, sometimes two the same day. Hirschfeld, in his book Berlins drittes Geschlecht (1904; "Berlín's Third Sex"), described the balls in following fashion:

The innkeepers of uranian taverns, but certainly not just them, organize large urning balls, especially in the course of the winter, that, in their size and type, are a specialty of Berlin. Outstanding strangers, especially foreigners, who want to see something very special in the youngest European world-cities, are shown by higher officials [to these balls] as one of the most interesting sights. [...] During the high season from October to Easter, these balls are held several times a week, often even several a night. Even though the entrance fee is rarely less than 1.50 marks, these events are usually well visited. Almost always, several secret policemen are present that make sure that nothing disgraceful happens; as far as I am informed, there was never any occasion to intervene. The organizers have the right to admit, if possible, only people who are known to them as homosexual. (Note: Own translation from original: Von einigen Wirten urnischer Lokale, aber durchaus nicht von diesen allein, werden namentlich im Winterhalbjahr große Urningsbälle veranstaltet, die in ihrer Art und Ausdehnung eine Spezialität von Berlin sind. Hervorragenden Fremden, namentlich Ausländern, die in der jüngsten der europäischen Weltstädte etwas ganz Besonderes zu sehen wünschen, werden sie von höheren Beamten als eine der interessantesten Sehenswürdigkeiten gezeigt. [...] In der Hochsaison von Oktober bis Ostern finden diese Bälle in der Woche mehrmals, oft sogar mehrere an einem Abend statt. Trotzdem das Eintrittsgeld selten weniger als 1,50 Mark beträgt, sind diese Veranstaltungen meist gut besucht. Fast stets sind mehrere Geheimpolizisten zugegen, die achtgeben, daß nichts Ungeziemendes vorkommt; soweit ich unterrichtet bin, lag aber noch nie ein Anlaß vor, einzuschreiten. Die Veranstalter haben Ordre, möglichst nur Personen einzulassen, die ihnen als homosexuell bekannt sind.)

Some of the balls were especially well known, particularly those shortly after New Year, on which the new, often self-made dresses are presented. When I visited this ball last year with some medical colleagues, there were about 800 people participating. Around 10 o'clock in the evening, the large halls are still almost deserted. The rooms begin to fill only after eleven o'clock. Many visitors dress in formal or street suit, but many are costumed. Some appear densely masked in impenetrable dominoes, they come and go without anyone knowing who they are; others reveal their faces at midnight, some come in fantastical costumes, a large part in evening gowns, some in simple, others in very elaborate toilets. I saw a South American man in a robe from Paris, its price had to be over 2,000 francs. (Note: Own translation from original: Einige der Bälle erfreuen sich eines besonderen Renommées, vor allem der kurz nach Neujahr veranstaltete, auf dem die neuen, vielfach selbst gefertigten Toiletten vorgeführt werden. Als ich diesen Ball im letzten Jahr mit einigen ärztlichen Kollegen besuchte, waren gegen 800 Personen zugegen. Gegen 10 Uhr abends sind die großen Säle noch fast menschenleer. Erst nach 11 Uhr beginnen sich die Räume zu füllen. Viele Besucher sind im Gesellschafts- oder Straßen-Anzug, sehr viele aber auch kostümiert. Einige erscheinen dicht maskiert in undurchdringlichen Dominos, sie kommen und gehen, ohne daß jemand ahnt, wer sie gewesen sind; andere lüften die Larve um Mitternacht, ein Teil kommt in Phantasiegewändern, ein großer Teil in Damenkleidern, manche in einfachen, andere in sehr kostbaren Toiletten. Ich sah einen Südamerikaner in einer Pariser Robe, deren Preis über 2000 Francs betragen sollte.)

Not few seem so feminine in their appearance and movements, that even connoisseurs find it hard to recognize the man. [...] Real women are only very sparse on these balls, only now and then does a uranist bring his landlady, a friend, or... his wife. In the case of the uranist, one does not proceed so strictly as on the analogous urninde balls, on which "real men" are strictly denied access. Most distasteful and repulsive [sight] on the balls are the not so infrequent gentlemen that, in spite of coming "as women", keep their stately mustaches or even a full-beard. The most beautiful costumes are greeted by a sign of the ceremony master with a thundering fanfare and guided by him through the hall. Between 12 and 1 o'clock the ball usually reaches its peak. At about 2 o'clock, the coffee break – the main source of income for the owner – takes place. In a few minutes, long tables are installed and layed, with several hundred people sitting at them; some humorous songs and dances of the attendant "lady imitators" season the conversation, then the cheerful activity continues until the early morning. (Note: Own translation from original: Nicht wenige wirken in ihrem Aussehen und ihren Bewegungen so weiblich, daß es selbst Kennern schwer fällt, den Mann zu erkennen. [...] Wirkliche Weiber sind auf diesen Bällen nur ganz spärlich vorhanden, nur dann und wann bringt ein Uranier seine Wirtin, eine Freundin oder – seine Ehefrau mit. Man verfährt im allgemeinen bei den Urningen nicht so streng wie auf den analogen Urnindenbällen, auf denen jedem »echten Mann« strengstens der Zutritt versagt ist. Am geschmacklosesten und abstoßendsten wirken auf den Bällen der Homosexuellen die ebenfalls nicht vereinzelten Herren, die trotz eines stattlichen Schnurrbartes oder gar Vollbartes »als Weib« kommen. Die schönsten Kostüme werden auf ein Zeichen des Einberufers mit donnerndem Tusch empfangen und von diesem selbst durch den Saal geleitet. Zwischen 12 und 1 Uhr erreicht der Besuch gewöhnlich seinen Höhepunkt. Gegen 2 Uhr findet die Kaffeepause – die Haupteinnahmequelle des Saalinhabers – statt. In wenigen Minuten sind lange Tafeln aufgeschlagen und gedeckt, an denen mehrere hundert Personen Platz nehmen; einige humoristische Gesangsvorträge und Tänze anwesender »Damenimitatoren« würzen die Unterhaltung, dann setzt sich das fröhliche Treiben bis zum frühen Morgen fort.)

— Magnus Hirschfeld, Berlins Drittes Geschlecht (1904), "Kapitel 3"

As a consequence of the Harden–Eulenburg affair, and the subsequent social upheaval, the balls where prohibited; in 1910 they were allowed again, but they never achieved the splendor of this golden age.

==== The Weimar Republic ====
After World War I the first mass movements for homosexuals appeared. The Freundschaftsbund, popular associations of gays and lesbians, dedicated an important part of their effort to socialization and diverse activities for their members such as excursions, visits, sports, and balls. For example, the club Kameradschaft ("camaraderie") organized on November 1, 1929, celebrating their anniversary, a Böser-Buben-Ball ("Bad Boys Ball"); the club reached 100 members, and survived until 1933. Kameradschaft tried to offer some support and activities for gays from lower extraction; so their balls were celebrated on weekends, Saturdays or Sundays, and gathered about 70 men, many without a job, who could pay the low entry price.

In 1922 the association Gesellschaftsklub Aleksander e.V. celebrated balls every day, beginning 7 o'clock p.m., with a quality orchestra. In 1927 the Bund für Menschenrecht (BfM) bought the Alexander-Palast, but that same year they changed to the Florida and the Tanz-Palast salon of the Zauberflöte, in the Kommandantenstraße 72, in Berlin. The BfM balls took place from Tuesdays to Sundays; the entry was free, but you had to pay 50 Pfennig for a dance card that allowed you to actually dance. In the 1920s gay balls reached enormous sizes, with premises filling several ballrooms with some thousands of men. And not just in Berlin, several other cities in Germany organized smaller balls for gays.

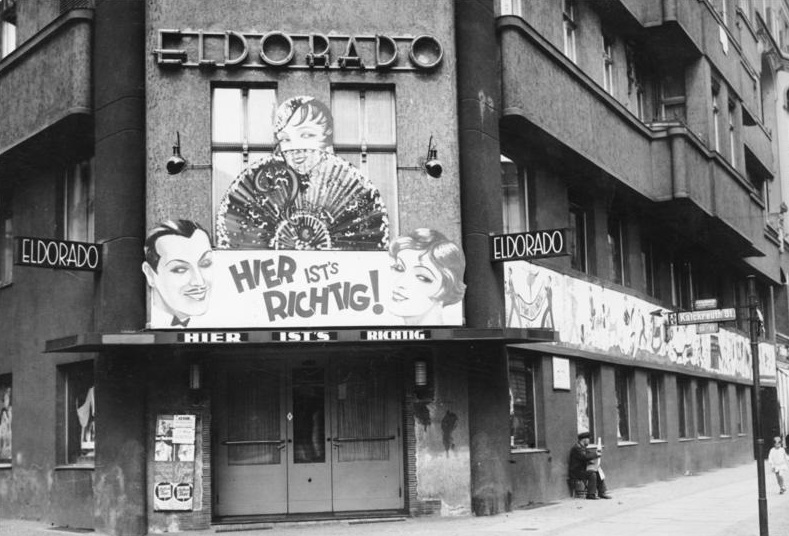
The Eldorado of the Motzstraße, in Berlin, 1932. The sign includes their motto: "Hier ist's Richtig!".

In the 1920s and 30s, there were uncountable bars, cafés, and dance halls in Berlin. The most elegant could be found in West Berlin, near the area formed by the Bülowstraße, the Potsdamer Straße, and the Nollendorfplatz, reaching up to the Kurfürstendamm.

No doubt, the most famous was Eldorado, that really was two, one on the Lutherstraße, and a second one in the Motzstraße. Curt Moreck (Konrad Haemmerling) described it in 1931, in his Führer durch das „lasterhafte" Berlin ("Guide through the 'dissolute' Berlin"), as "an establishment of transvestites staged for the morbid fascination of the world metropolis." The program at the Eldorado included loud and racy shows by drag queens, addressed mostly to a heterosexual audience, that, now as then, wanted to "satisfy their curiosity, and dared to visit the mysterious and infamous Berlin". Moreck continues, even though he himself was encouraging, and was part of this kind of voyeuristic tourism with his travel guide:

A dance hall of a larger style, with an extremely elegant audience. Tuxedos and tailcoats, and full evening dresses – this is the normality that comes to observe here. The actors are present in large numbers. Bright posters are already luring at the entrance, and paintings, where the perversity mocks itself, decorate the corridor. At the wardrobe begins the swindle. "Here it's right!" (Note: The original German, Hier ist's richtig!, can be translated in several ways; richtig can be translated as "right", "correct", "good", "adequate", "real", or "authentic". As can be seen in the text that follows, the meaning was not clear in German either.) A mysterious motto, that can mean anything. Everything is staged scenery, and only the worldly innocent believe in its authenticity. Even the real transvestites, who put their anomaly at the service of the business, become comedians here. Between the dances, where even the normal man can afford the naughty pleasure of dancing with an effeminate man in female dress, there are cabaret performances. A tomboy chanteuse sings with her shrill soprano voice ambiguous Parisian chansons. A very girlish revue star proceeds under the spotlight with female graceful pirouettes. He is naked except for the breast plates and a loincloth, and even this nakedness is deceptive, it still makes the spectators question, it still leaves doubts whether man, or woman. One of the most enchanting and elegant women present in the hall is often the dainty Bob, and there are enough men who, in the depths of their hearts, are sorry that he is not a girl, that nature, through an error, has deceived them of a delicate lover. (Note: Own translation from original: Ein Tanzsaal größeren Stils mit einem äußerst eleganten Publikum. Smokings und Fräcke und große Abendroben – so präsentiert sich die Normalität, die zum Schauen hierher kommt. Die Akteurs sind in großer Zahl vorhanden. Grelle Plakate locken schon am Eingang, und Malereien, in denen die Perversität ihrer selbst spottet, schmücken den Gang. An der Garderobe setzt der Nepp ein. ‚Hier ist’s richtig!‘ heißt es auf den Affichen. Eine geheimnisvolle Devise, unter der man sich allerhand vorstellen kann. Alles ist Kulisse, und nur der ganz Weltfremde glaubt an ihre Echtheit. Selbst die echten Transvestiten, die ihre Abart in den Dienst des Geschäftes stellen, werden hier Komödianten. Zwischen den Tänzen, bei denen auch der Normale sich den pikanten Genuss leisten kann, mit einem effeminierten Manne in Frauenkleidern zu tanzen, gibt es Brettldarbietungen. Eine männliche Chanteuse singt mit ihrem schrillen Sopran zweideutige Pariser Chansons. Ein ganz mädchenhafter Revuestar tanzt unter dem Scheinwerferlicht weiblich graziöse Pirouetten. Er ist nackt bis auf die Brustschilde und einen Schamgurt, und selbst diese Nacktheit ist noch täuschend, sie macht den Zuschauern noch Kopfzerbrechen, sie läßt noch Zweifel, ob Mann ob Frau. Eine der entzückendsten und elegantesten Frauen, die im ganzen Saale anwesend sind, ist oft der zierliche Bob, und es gibt Männer genug, die in der Tiefe ihres Herzens bedauern, daß er kein Mädchen ist, daß die Natur sie durch einen Irrtum um eine deliziöse Geliebte betrogen hat.)

— Curt Moreck (1931)

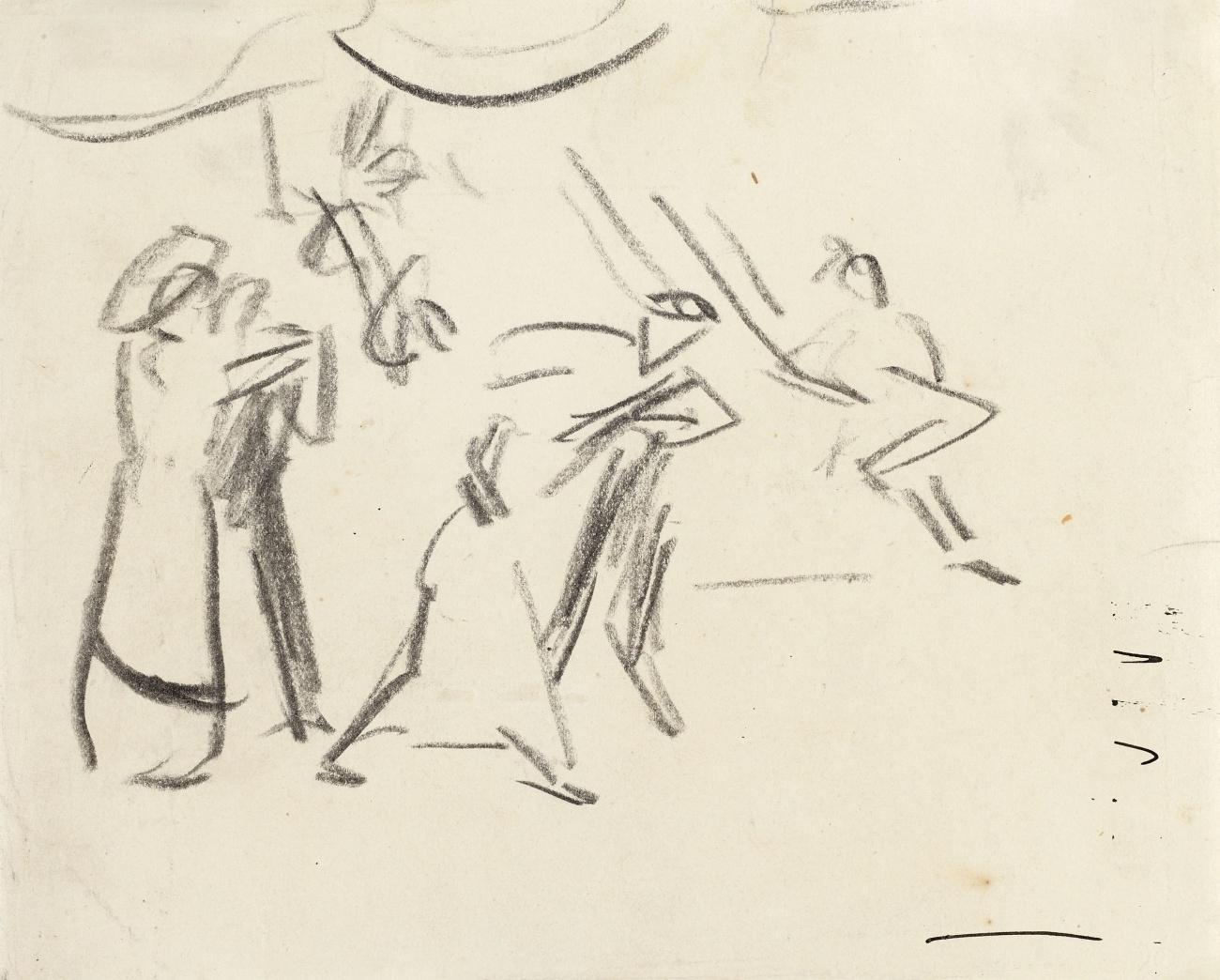
Dance scene (dancing people in Eldorado) (1910), sketch by Ernst Ludwig Kirchner (1880–1938)

Eldorado became one of the nocturnal cultural centers in Europe. The establishment hosted from bank managers to members of parliament, as well as theater actors and movie stars. Among them, divas like Marlene Dietrich, often with her husband Rudolf Sieber, and Anita Berber, singers like Claire Waldoff, and writers, like Wolfgang Cordan, Egon Erwin Kisch, or Josef Hora. Magnus Hirschfeld was well known there.

The co-founder and commander of the SA, Ernst Röhm, was also a patron, and Karl Ernst, later a nazi politician and Gruppenführer SA, tried to survive for a time working —depending on the source— as a waiter, an employee, or a rent boy in the Eldorado of the Lutherstraße. The ballroom cum cabaret has been mentioned, directly or indirectly, serving as inspiration, in many literary works, as in Mr Norris Changes Trains (1935) and Goodbye to Berlin (1939) by Christopher Isherwood, or the memories of Erika, and Klaus Mann. The atmosphere has been captured in paintings by Otto Dix, and Ernst Fritsch.

By the end of the 1920s, the German society had taken their image of homosexuals from this kind of establishment: decadent, refined, depraved, degenerate, tightly linked to drugs, wild sex, and prostitution. The Bund für Menschenrecht tried to distance gays of this kind of milieu in 1927, but to no avail. In 1932 the chancellor Franz von Papen started a campaign against the "depraved night of Berlin", and in October of that same year all balls for homosexuals were prohibited.

On January 30, 1933, the nazi party came to power, and on February 23, 1933, the Prussian Interior Minister ordered that all bars "that have abused [their permit] to promote immorality" be closed. He was referring specially to those "that are frequented by those who pay homage to the anti-natural immorality". On March 4, 1933, the Berliner Tagblatt informed about the closing of some establishments the day before. Of the over 100 establishments catering to homosexuals in Berlin very few survived, and those would be used to help watch and control the homosexual population.

=== France ===
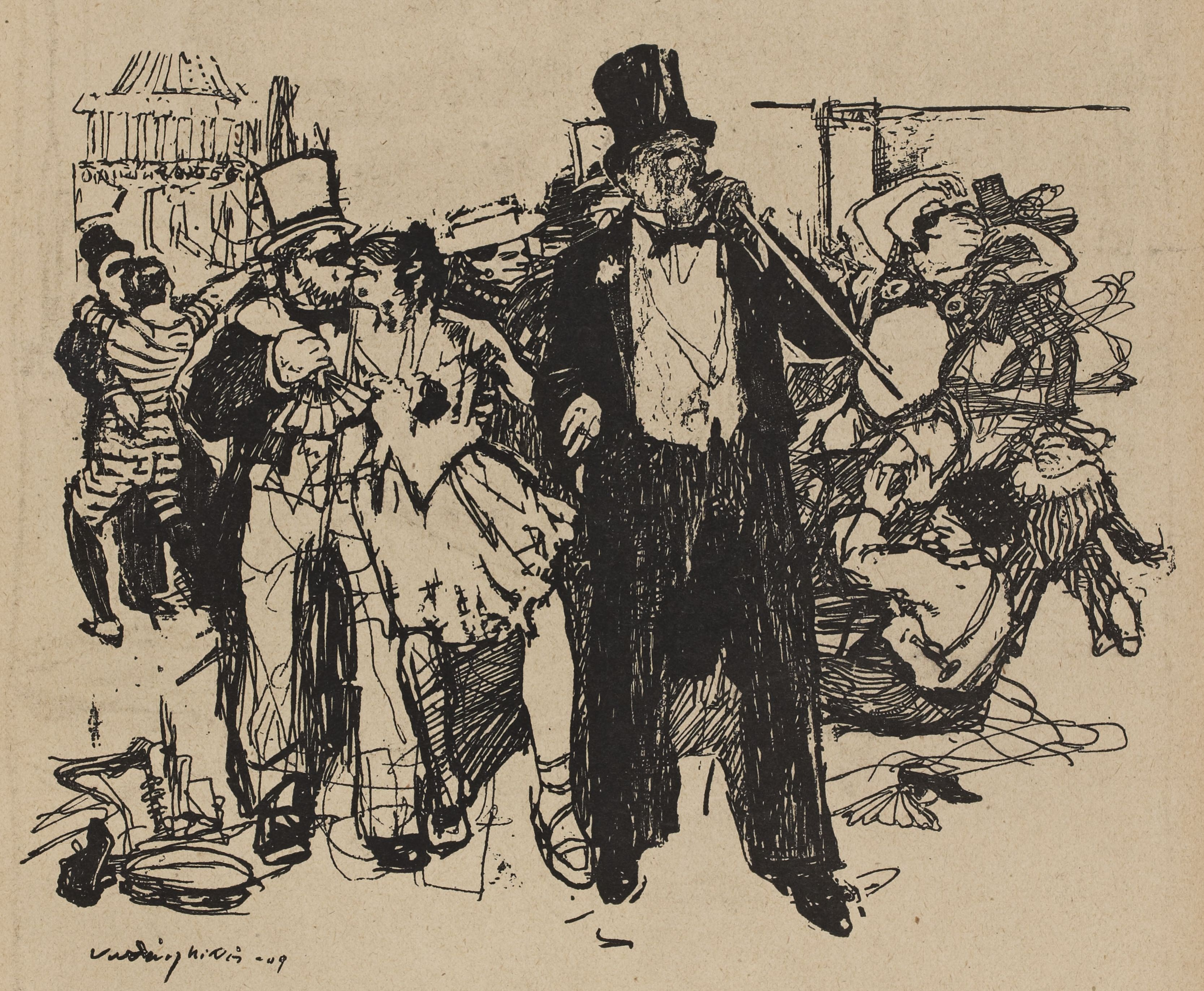
Drawing of a carnival ball about 1909, with the commentary "AU BAL DE LA MI-CARÊME". The drawing was done by Hungarian artist Miklós Vadász, and shows a blushing rich man arm in arm with a young woman, herself kissing another man; on the left, what seems two to be men dancing together. The image was published in the number 422 of the anarchist magazine L'Assiette au Beurre, titled Les p'tits jeun' hommes ("The little young men"), dedicated to the decadent aristocrats, and the effeminate kept men.

In France, until the end of the 19th century, gays and lesbians met usually in private homes and literary salons, hidden from the public, with the Opera Ball in Paris one of the few exceptions. The Opera Ball, celebrated yearly for carnival, allowed some small leeway. The first big public ball that allowed cross-dressing was the Bal Bullier in 1880, in the Avenue de l'Observatoire, followed by the Bal Wagram in 1910.

After World War I, Paris became one of the nightlife centers in Europe, with focal points in Montmartre, Pigalle, and Montparnasse, and numerous short-lived bars catering to gays and lesbians, surviving between police raids, ruinous scandals, and the public's insatiable thirst for new thrills. Many establishments were also known for drug trafficking. Journalist Willy described the atmosphere in the bar "The Petite Chaumière", catering to foreigners looking for strong sensations:

The pianist gives a prelude to a shimmy, and as if on cue the professionals who are paid to give the viewers a spectacle immediately latch onto one another. They ondulate more than dance, and thrust their pelvises obscenely, shimmying their bosoms and delicately grasping the legs of their trousers, which they raise above their shiny boots with each step forward, all the while winking at the customers. (Note: The author is describing the usual way to dance the "shimmy", a new dance style that scandalized the society at the time.) They wear very fine clothing, and some appear to have built up their chests with cotton wadding. Others wear low-cut kimonos, and one of them wears an Oriental costume all in silver lamé. (Note: Translation by Florence Tamaigne (2006) from the original: Par quelques accords fêlés, le pianiste prélude à un shimmy. Les professionnels de l'endroit, payés pour donner le spectacle à la galerie, s'enlacent aussitôt. Ils ondulent plutôt qu'ils ne dansent. Ils se choquent le ventre d'un mouvement obscène, à chaque temps d'arrêt, impriment à leur buste de courts frémissements, et pincent délicatement entre leurs doigts la jambe du pantalon, qu'ils relèvent sur la bottine vernie à chaque pas en avant, en lançant de œillades à la clientèle. Ils sont habillés avec un grand raffinement. Certains semblent s'être rembourrés la poitrine avec l'ouate. D'autres exhibent des kimonos largement décolletés. L'un d'eux porte un costume oriental tout lamé d'argent.)

— Willy, Le troisième sexe (1927), p.173-174

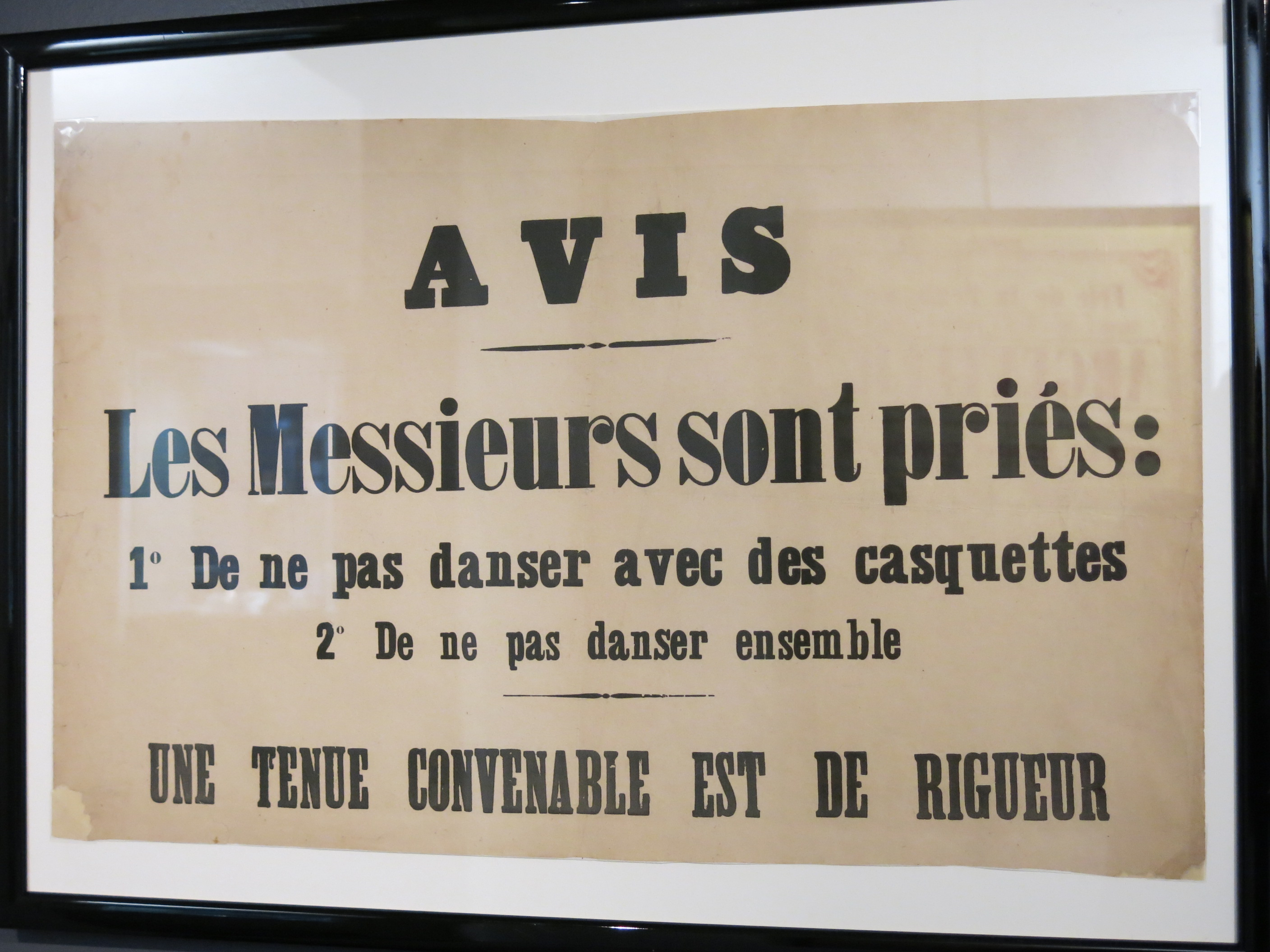
A sign from the 1920s. Notice The Gentlemen are requested to: 1° No dancing with the hat on. 2° No dancing together. A proper outfit is strictly enforced.

In the 1920s, there were several balls in the Bastille area; these occurred mainly in the Rue de Lappe, where workers, drunken sailors, and colonial soldiers gathered to dance. It was not strictly a homosexual milieu, but men could dance together, and one could find a partner for the night. Daniel Guérin described one of the dens as a place where "[...] workmen, prostitutes, society women, johns, and aunties all danced. In those relaxed and natural days, before the cops took over France, a chevalier could go out in public with a mate of the same sex, without being considered crazy.» On the other hand, Willy presents a completely different aspect of the milieu, "What you see are little delinquents, not too carefully washed but heavily made up, with caps on their heads and sporting brightly colored foulards; these are the guys who, when they fail to make a buck here, will certainly be found hauling coal or other cargo."

The so-called bal de folles, and later bal de invertis, flourished in Paris after the I World War, and even in other French cities as Toulon. In Paris, homosexuals were attracted mainly to the Bal Musette de la Montaigne de Sainte-Geneviève, in the number 46 of the Rue Montaigne de Sainte-Geneviève, where you could find gays and lesbians. Later, the big balls for carnival attracted a gay public, as the one celebrated yearly in the Magic-City, in the rue de l'Université, 180, inaugurated in 1920, and active until the prohibition on February 6, 1934.

In time, the "Carnaval interlope" in Magic-City became a big event, visited by prominent vedette from the varietés, like Mistinguett, or Joséphine Baker, that handed over awards to the best drag queens. The Bal Wagram offered the opportunity to cross-dress twice a year; at 1 am, the drag queens did the pont aux travestis, a costume competition, doing the catwalk in front of the most selected people of Paris, that came to walk on the wild side for a night.

The drag queens participating came from all walks of life, and ages, and presented a savage satire of the society, its values, and its traditional hierarchies, with images of exaggerated femininity, and masculinity: countesses dressed in crinoline, crazy virgins, oriental dancers, sailors, ruffians, or soldiers; theirs names were correspondingly colorful: Duchess of the Bubble, the Infante Eudoxie, the Mauve Mouse; the Dark One, Sweetie Pie, Fréda, the Englishwoman, Mad Maria, the Muse, the Teapot, the She-wolf, Sappho, Wet Cat, Little Piano, Princess of the Marshes, Marguerite if Burgundy, etc. Charles Étienne, in his novel Notre-Dame-de-Lesbos, describes "Didine" in following fashion:

Stuffed into a yellow brocade dress, wearing a red wig topped by a trembling tiara of paste, the dress low-cut and in the back naked to the waist, revealing the physique of a prize fighter, a man climbed the staircase, twisting adroitly and with meticulous gestures lifting the long train of her skirts.

— Charles Étienne, Notre-Dame-de-Lesbos; translation Tamagne (2006)

Many of the onlookers just went to insult and harass the gay people participating, as Charles Étienne describes in his novel Le Bal des folles:

After the bruising attack outside, here the reception was more restrained, but quite as bitter, inside. All along the balustrade, clusters of people perched, climbed, and packed together to the point of smothering, raised a mocking jeer: two hundred heads with eyes flaming and mouths hurling insults [...] a Greek chorus of poisonous epithets, ridicule, and slurs [...]

— Charles Étienne, Le Bal des folles; translation Tamagne (2006)

=== England ===
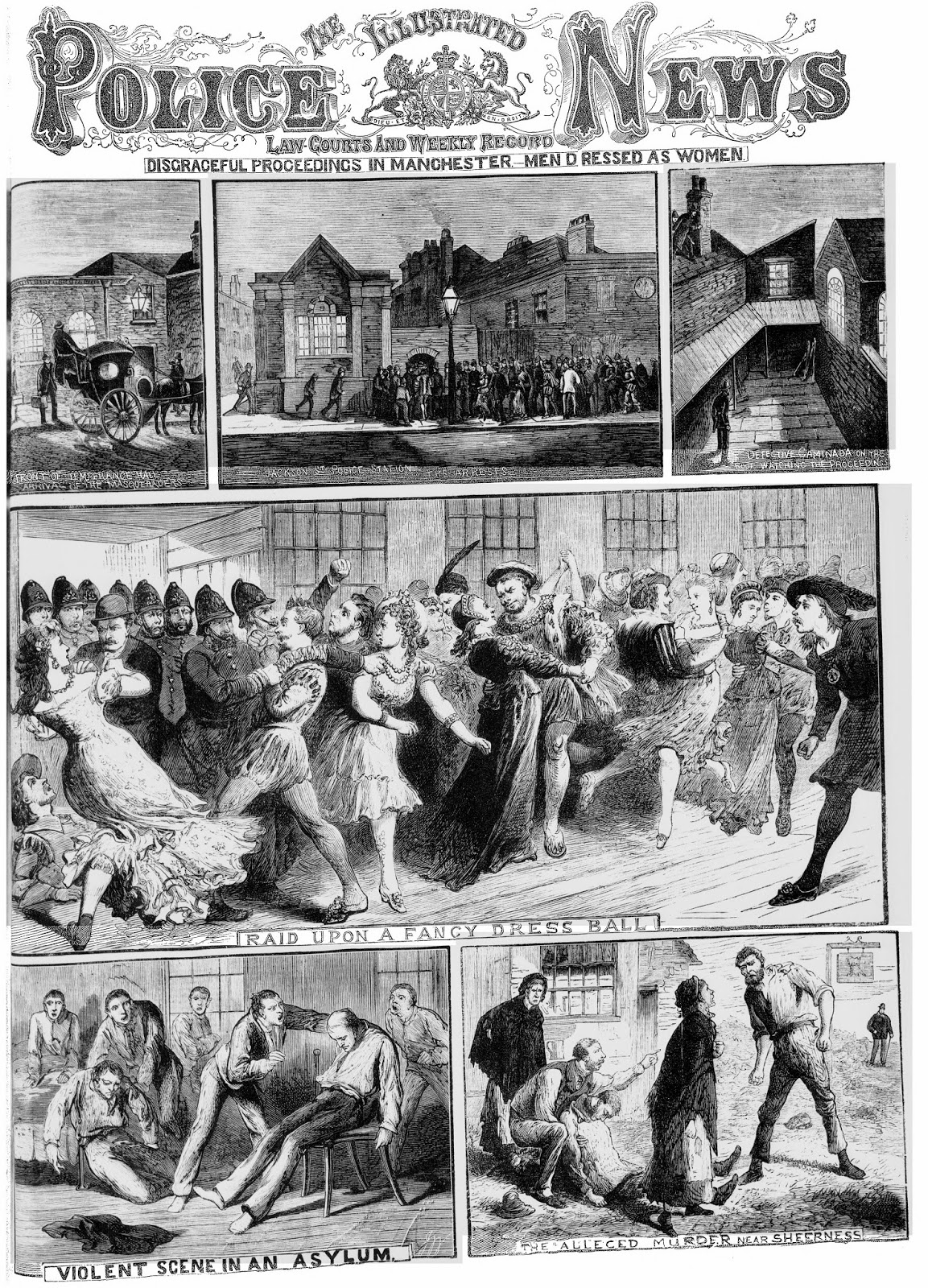
Front page of the tabloid The Illustrated Police News on the week of the raid at Temperance Hall, in Hulme, Manchester

There are at least two instances of cross-dressing balls that have been documented in England. The first one was known through a police raid of a ball celebrated in the Temperance Hall, in the Hulme area of Manchester. On September 24, 1880, the Chief Constable of Manchester received anonymous information about an event "of an immoral character" that was about to take place in the Temperance Hall of Hulme. The detective Jerome Caminada was dispatched with police constables to observe the ball and make any necessary arrests.

Of the 47 men that congregated, all wore fancy dress costumes, 22 as women; a pair was dressed as Henry VIII and Anne Boleyn, and another as Romeo and Juliet. The windows of the Temperance Hall had mostly been blacked out and so Detective Caminada and his constables had to observe the ball from a neighbouring rooftop. Caminada reported that the ball had begun at 9.00 pm, that dancing had commenced at around 10.00 pm and that every now and then, a couple disappeared into a side room. Just after 1.00 am, mindful that some guests had started to leave, Caminada gained entry to the ball by giving the password "sister" in an effeminate manner to a doorman dressed as a nun. After the door was opened, the police raided the building, and detained all participants.

The trial showed that some of the revellers were not from Manchester and were regulars of similar balls that were organized in several cities, as Leeds, or Nottingham. The men were bound over to keep the peace on two sureties of £25 each, a significant sum. Some were unable to pay it and ended up in prison as a result. All the arrested men had their names, addresses and professions published widely. LGBT+ History Month in the UK commissioned Stephen M Hornby and Ric Brady to write a three-part play about the ball, A Very Victorian Scandal, as part of the first OUTing The Past festival in 2015 in Manchester. Russell T Davies was patron of the play and Dr Jeff Evans acted as the Historical Adviser to the writers.

Dr. Matt Houlbrook, of the University of Liverpool, affirms that in the 1920s and 30s, cross-dressing balls were being held secretly almost every weekend, gathering 50 to 100 men. And this, in spite of it being illegal, and being a big personal risk for those participating: they didn't just risk prison, if found out, they could lose their livelihood, be isolated socially, and finally suffer a nervous breakdown, or try suicide. In 1933 headlines informed about "Lady Austin's Camp Boys" scandal.

The affair began when 60 men were detained in a private ball room, in Holland Park Avenue, in London, after cross-dressing police officers had been watching them dancing, made up, dressed as women, and having sex. Twenty-seven men were arrested, and convicted between 3 and 20 months of jail. Even so, many stood up for their behavior, notoriously Lady Austin, who said "There is nothing wrong [in who we are]. You call us nancies and bum boys but before long our cult will be allowed in the country."

=== Spain ===
Mid 19th century, during the reign of Isabella II, appeared the sociedades de baile, "ball societies", mostly groups of young people that tried to rent some premises to organize a ball; but there were also other, more elegant, or pretentious, that rented theaters for their balls. The ball societies exclusively catering to gays appeared shortly after, mainly in Madrid, and Barcelona, as there were no special requirements to create one, and could be established, and broken up very easily. The most important ball society for the "Uranian flock" met at the El Ramillete, in the calle Alvareda, in Madrid, where you could count "over a hundred sodomites with elegant suits, and rich jewelry". In Barcelona, later, during the regency of Maria Christina, the biggest number of gay dancers met at the Liceo Rius.

The dancing public was of all types, but mainly transvestites and young men of the working class – workers of trade and commerce, workshop apprentices, and servants – for whom the balls were the highest point of their lives: exploited by their employers, and frightened of being discovered by the society. The balls allowed them to forget their situation for a couple of hours, express themselves with freedom, mingle with their equals, and, with a little luck, meet someone. Other, less fortunate, as was the case for transvestites, effeminate men, and chulitos de barrio, neighborhood thugs, without a job, or rejected by their families, they used the balls to find their first time customers. For carnival, huge balls were celebrated, and the boys spend the whole year preparing their costumes for that important day.

At the beginning of the 20th century, all these balls had already disappeared, and were just a memory of the past, as recounts the author Max Bembo in his book, La mala vida en Barcelona ("The Bad Life in Barcelona"): "I could not find in the homosexualism of Barcelona the appearance it used to have; the parties where the baptism of homosexuals were celebrated; the very scandalous balls; the sardanapalic festivities, the shame of the city". It's very probable that the disappearance of these public balls was due to the application of laws of public indecency, and the consequent withdrawal of the homosexual life into private residencies, and clubs.

=== United States ===
==== Stag dance ====
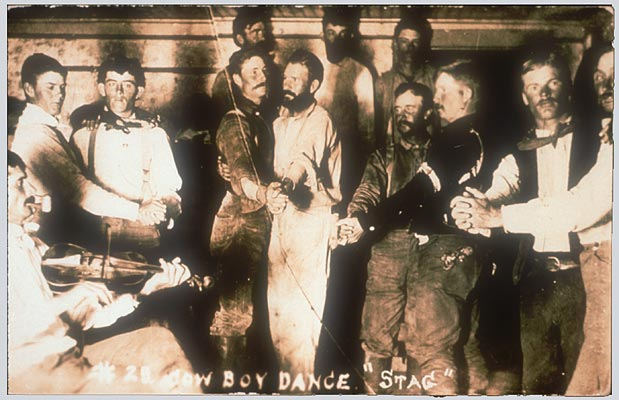
Cowboy stag dance from about 1910

During the 19th century, in the United States, mainly in the Great West Frontier, there were many towns where women were few and far between. So, for cowboys, miners, loggers, mountain men or railroad workers, it was very difficult to find a woman, and marry. In these groups, men often formed intimate friendships, that sometimes ended in real love stories, that were accepted as a fact of life. It is difficult to know up to what point this was simply due to the lack of women, or if precisely this kind of life attracted those men that preferred the company of other men.

In this environment, and in the military, (Note: In military circles it was not uncommon to organize balls where men would dance with each other, as women could not be part of the military, and very often were not available. There are several short films documenting the fact, as Jacks 'the Dasant', from 1922, that shows a ball celebrated on HMS Hood, with Brazilian, U.S., French, and Japanese sailors participating; Interned Sailors, from about 1914–1918, is a short film of unknown origin, depicting a group of sailors looking, while two play the accordion, and other dance together; or male soldiers dancing together during WWI, that shows a group of sailors dancing on a ship.) is where the stag dances developed, and where men danced with each other, without it having any special meaning. Beemyn talks about the stag dances celebrated in San Francisco during the gold rush, in 1849, similar to frontier celebrations called Rocky Mountain Rendezvous. Thousands of young men arrived to the city from all continents, converting a small frontier town into an amusement city, where everything was possible. Thanks to the lack of women, and prejudices, men had fun with each other, also dancing. In these balls, the men that took the role of the woman usually wore a handkerchief knotted around their arm, but there were also those that dressed as women.

==== Drag ball ====
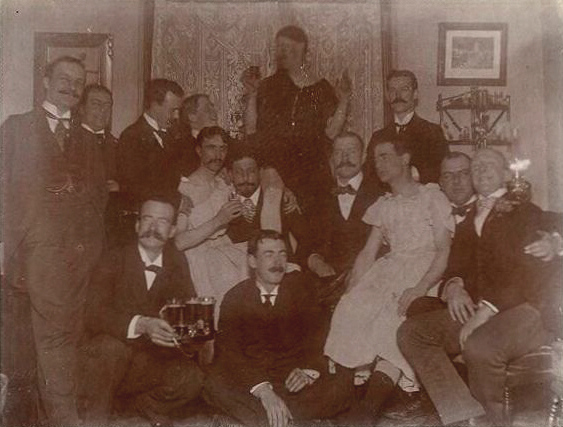
A drag ball at a private home in Portland, Oregon in the 1900s

Drag balls in the United States can trace their origins to the debutante balls, quadroon balls, and costume parties at the end of the 19th century. In the beginning, they were simple parties where men dressed as women, and women dressed as men could go, and where two men could dance with each other. The first recorded drag ball was the Hamilton Lodge Ball in 1869. There are records of more exclusive balls by the 1880s, where homosexuals – men and women – could be counted in the hundreds, up to 500 same sex couples, that slowly waltzed the night away at the sound of an excellent orchestra.

In the 1920s these balls had already become big social events in the gay and lesbian world, where —mainly men— competed for the best costume. Often, they included a "parade of the fairies", to show the costumes, and the participants with the most spectacular gowns received a prize, in the form of money. The judges often were personalities from literature, and the show business. It was mainly in the black communities of New York City, Chicago, Baltimore, and New Orleans where these balls took place, sometimes bringing in white party-goers.

In Manhattan, these balls got to have official permits, and police protection, and security, in places like the Webster Hall, and the Madison Square Garden, the Astor Hotel, the Manhattan Casino (later called Rockland Palace), The Harlem Alhambra, and the Savoy Ballroom in the Black Harlem, and the New Star Casino, in the Italian Harlem. The planners of these balls became well known: H. Mann in the 1910s, Kackie Mason in the 1920s, and 30s, Phil Black in the 1930s to 60s, were celebrated in many a novel. In 1933 they were described as:

On the floor of the hall, in every conceivable sort of fancy dress, men quaver and palpitate in each other's embrace. Many of the "effeminate" are elaborately coiffured, in the powdered head dresses of the period of Madame Pompadour. They wear billowy, ballooning skirt of that picturesque pre-guillotine era [... O]thers wear the long, tight-fitting gowns which were a recent vogue [... while] still others wear the long, trailing skirts and the constricting corsets of the 1880s—yards of elaborately furbelowed material, frou-frouing behind them, when space permits.

— op. cit. Chauncey (1994)

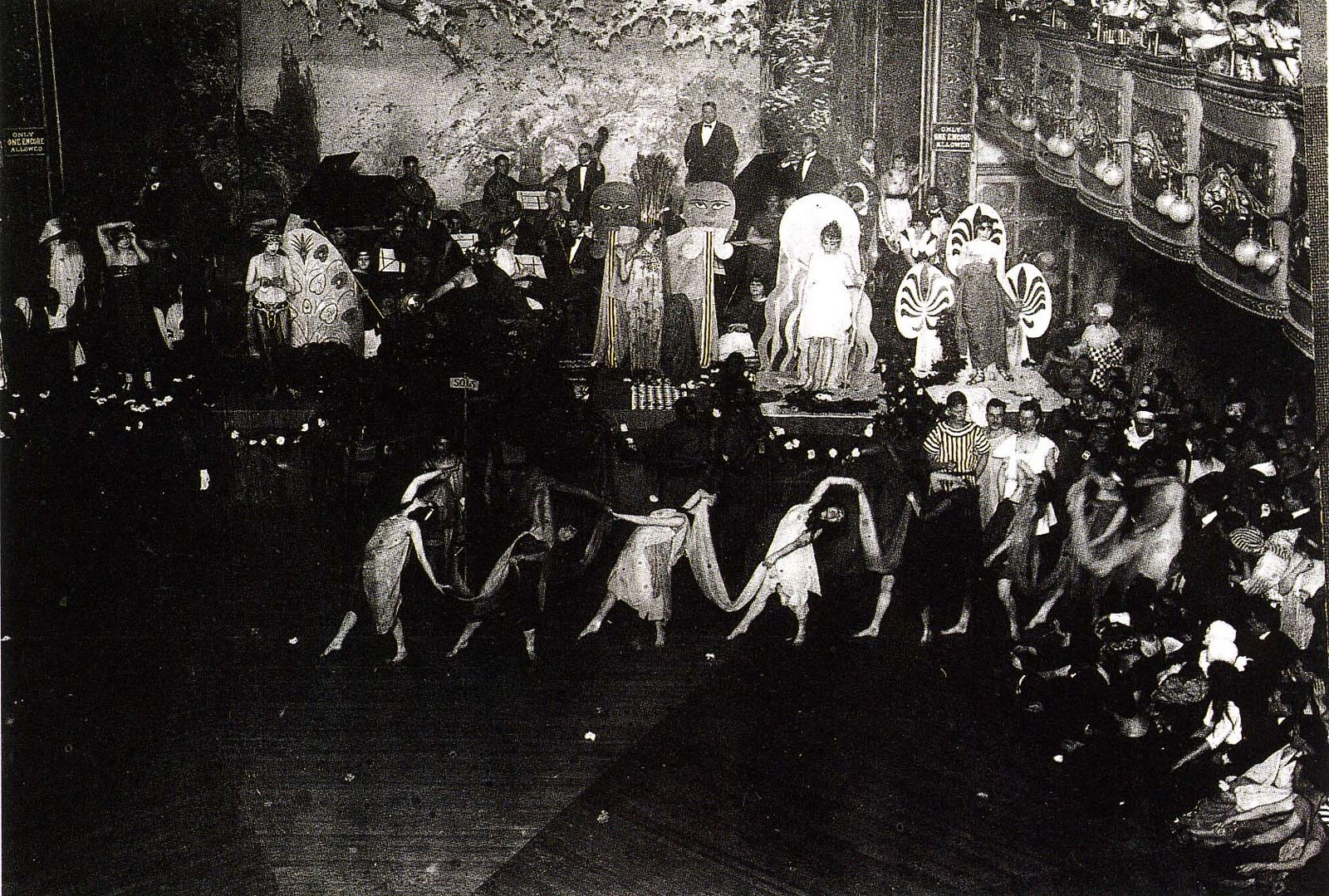
A drag ball from the 1920s, celebrated in the Webster Hall, in Greenwich Village, Lower Manhattan

The most famous drag ball was the Masquerade and Civic Ball —also known as "Faggots Ball" or "Fairies Ball"—, in Upper Manhattan's Harlem. The Masquerade and Civic Ball was celebration held every two years, beginning in 1869, organized by the Grand United Order of Odd Fellows, an afro-American association independent of other American fraternal orders that did not accept black men. The ball was enormously popular, attracting even white public, but that didn't stop critics, and hecklers. And in spite of there being racial tensions, gender restrictions —two men could only dance together if one of them was dressed as a woman—, and class barriers, these balls became some of the few places where black and white people could socialize, and homosexuals might even find some romance.

The biannual event provided gay men with an opportunity to meet, dance, and socialize. The balls were a focal point in the lives of many: outfits were prepared months in advance and gossip about the dances continued for months after they had occurred.

Mainly the smaller balls were the objective of police raids, that sometimes arrested those participating. To justify the arrests, they used a law from 1846 that prohibited being in disguise in public, even though it had practically only been used since the change of the century to harass transvestites. Drag balls celebrated in private establishments, and homes, even though they were somewhat safer, also were often visited by the police. By the 1930s the tension with the police had extended to the balls with official permit, signaling a change in the social mores that finally had the two last grand balls in the season 1930–31 canceled. The balls entered a definitive decadence after the derogation of the Prohibition in 1933, with the libertine culture of the speakeasies, where cross-dressing was allowed, disappearing with it.

=== Latin America ===
==== Dance of the Forty-One ====
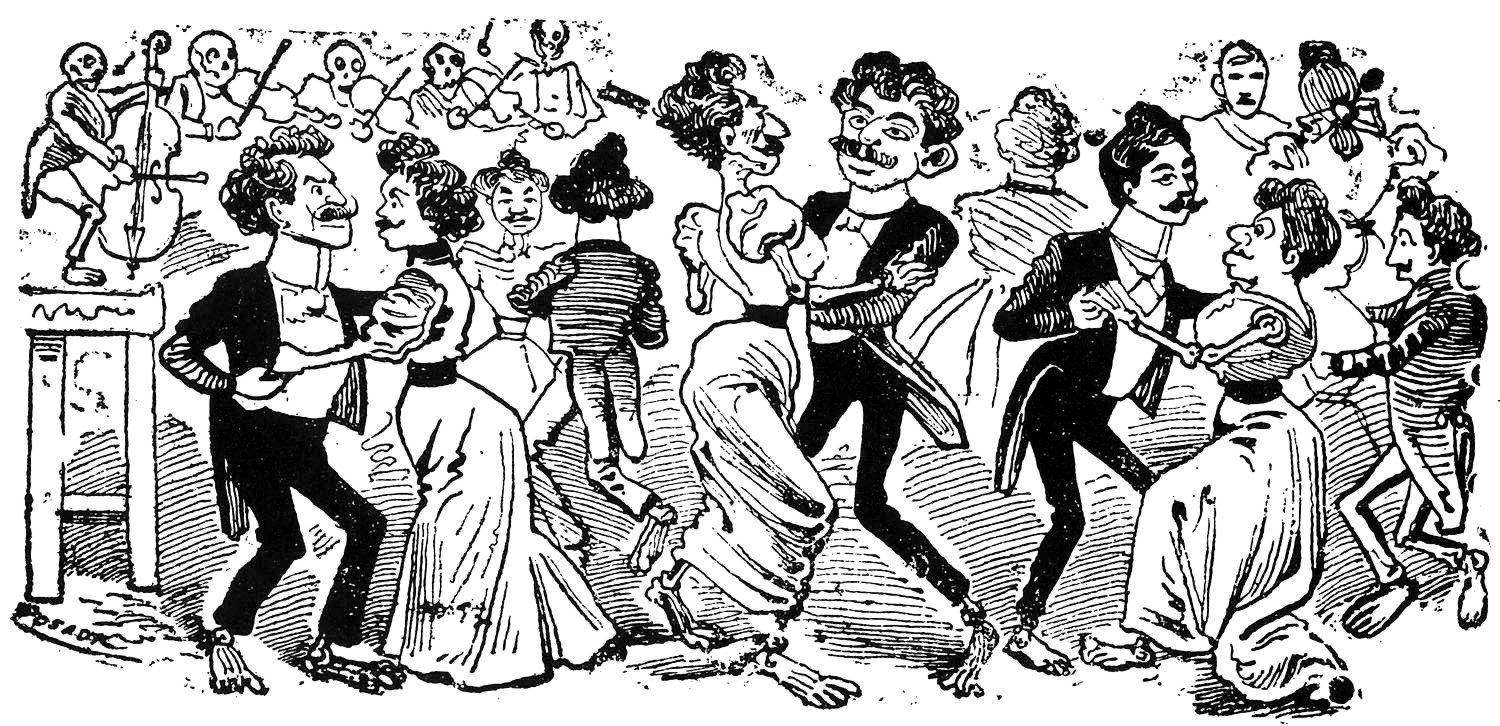
Drawing of the Dance of the Forty-One Faggots, Mexico, c. 1901

In Mexico, the country's biggest scandal at the turn of the twentieth century was the so-called "Dance of the Forty-One" or "Dance of the Forty-One Faggots". It refers to a police raid on November 18, 1901, during the government of Porfirio Díaz, on a private home, situated in the calle de la Paz (nowadays calle Ezequiel Montes), where at that moment a group of 41 men, 22 dressed as men, and 19 as women, were celebrating a ball. The Mexican press mocked cruelly the dancers, even as the government tried to cover up the incident, as many of the participants belonged to the higher echelons of the porfirian society. The list of names was never revealed.

On Sunday night, at a house on the fourth block of Calle la Paz, the police burst into a dance attended by 41 unaccompanied men wearing women's clothes. Among those individuals were some of the dandies seen every day on Calle Plateros. They were wearing elegant ladies' dresses, wigs, false breasts, earrings, embroidered slippers, and their faces were painted with highlighted eyes and rosy cheeks. When the news reached the street, all forms of comments were made and the behavior of those individuals was subjected to censure. We refrain from giving our readers further details because they are exceedingly disgusting. (Note: Own translation from original text: La noche del domingo fue sorprendido por la policía, en una casa accesoria de la 4a. calle de la Paz, un baile que 41 hombres solos verificaban vestidos de mujer. Entre algunos de esos individuos fueron reconocidos los pollos que diariamente se ven pasar por Plateros. Estos vestían elegantísimos trajes de señoras, llevaban pelucas, pechos postizos, aretes, choclos bordados y en las caras tenían pintadas grandes ojeras y chapas de color. Al saberse la noticia en los boulevares, se han dado toda clase de comentarios y se censura la conducta de dichos individuos. No damos a nuestros lectores más detalles por ser en sumo grado asquerosos.)

— Contemporary press report.

Even though the raid did not have any legal grounds, and was completely arbitrary, the 41 detained men ended up forcefully conscripted into the military:

The derelicts, petty thieves, and effeminates sent to Yucatán are not in the battalions of the Army fighting against the Maya Indians, but have been assigned to public works in the towns retaken from the common enemy of civilization. (Note: Translation by Sifuentes-Jáuregui from original text: Los vagos, rateros y afeminados que han sido enviados a Yucatán, no han sido consignados a los batallones del Ejército que operan en la campaña contra los indígenas mayas, sino a las obras públicas en las poblaciones conquistadas al enemigo común de la civilización)

— El Popular, 25 November 1901

The number 41 (or 42, as it was rumored that Ignacio de la Torre, Porfirio Díaz's son-in-law, had escaped) became part of Mexico's popular culture as a way to refer to homosexuals, passive homosexuals for the number 42. The incident and the numbers were spread through press reports, but also through engravings, satires, plays, literature, and paintings; in recent years, they have even appeared on television, in the historical telenovela El vuelo del águila, first broadcast by Televisa in 1994. In 1906 Eduardo A. Castrejón published a book titled Los cuarenta y uno. Novela crítico-social. José Guadalupe Posada's engravings alluding to the affair are famous, and were frequently published alongside satirical verses:

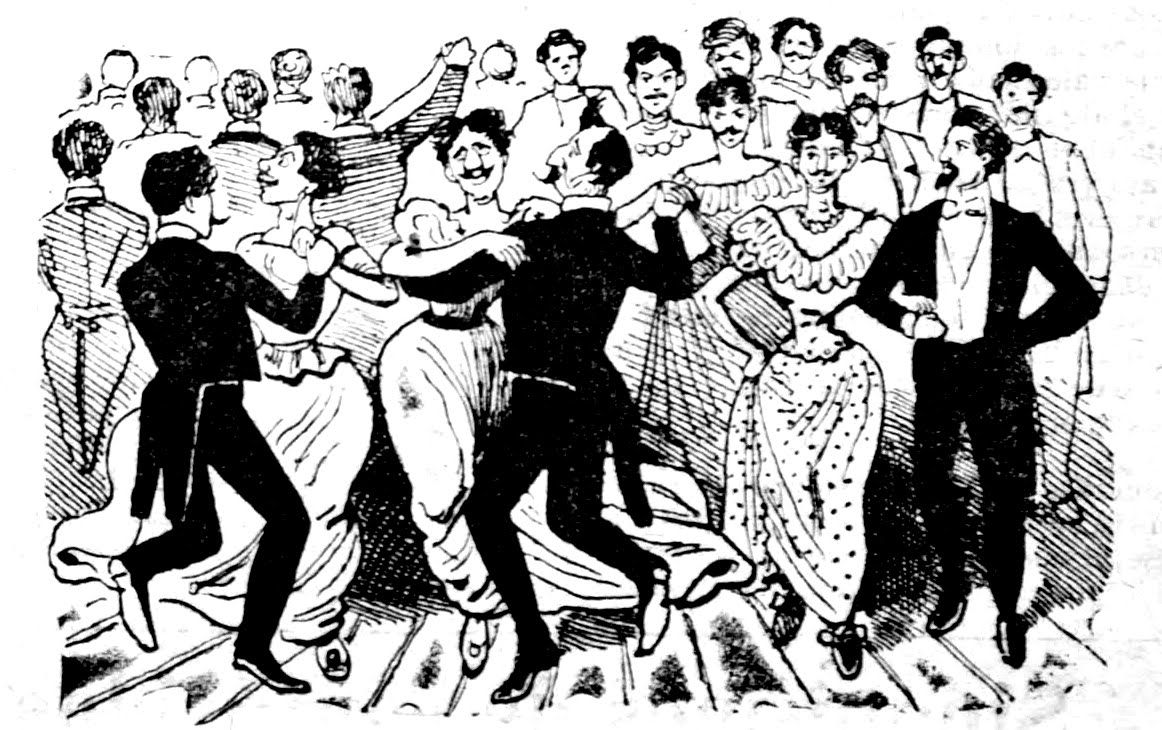
Engraving from Guadalupe Posada illustrating the poem to the left

Aqui están los maricones
muy chulos y coquetones.

Hace aún muy pocos días
Que en la calle de la Paz,
Los gendarmes atisbaron
Un gran baile singular.
Cuarenta y un lagartijos
Disfrazados la mitad
De simpáticas muchachas
Bailaban como el que más.
La otra mitad con su traje,
Es decir de masculinos,
Gozaban al estrechar
A los famosos jotitos.
Vestidos de raso y seda
Al último figurín,
Con pelucas bien peinadas
Y moviéndose con chic.

— anonymous
Translation:

Here are the Faggots
very Pretty and Coquettish.

It has only been a few days
that on La Paz street,
the police came upon
a grand and peculiar dance.
Forty-one lizards
half of whom were disguised
as cute girls
were dancing with much gusto.
The others with their suits,
that is, masculine attire,
enjoyed hugging
the famous little faggots.
Dressed in taffeta and silk
in the latest style,
with well-coiffed wigs
and moving with chic.

— translation by Sifuentes-Jáuregui (2002)

==== Argentina ====
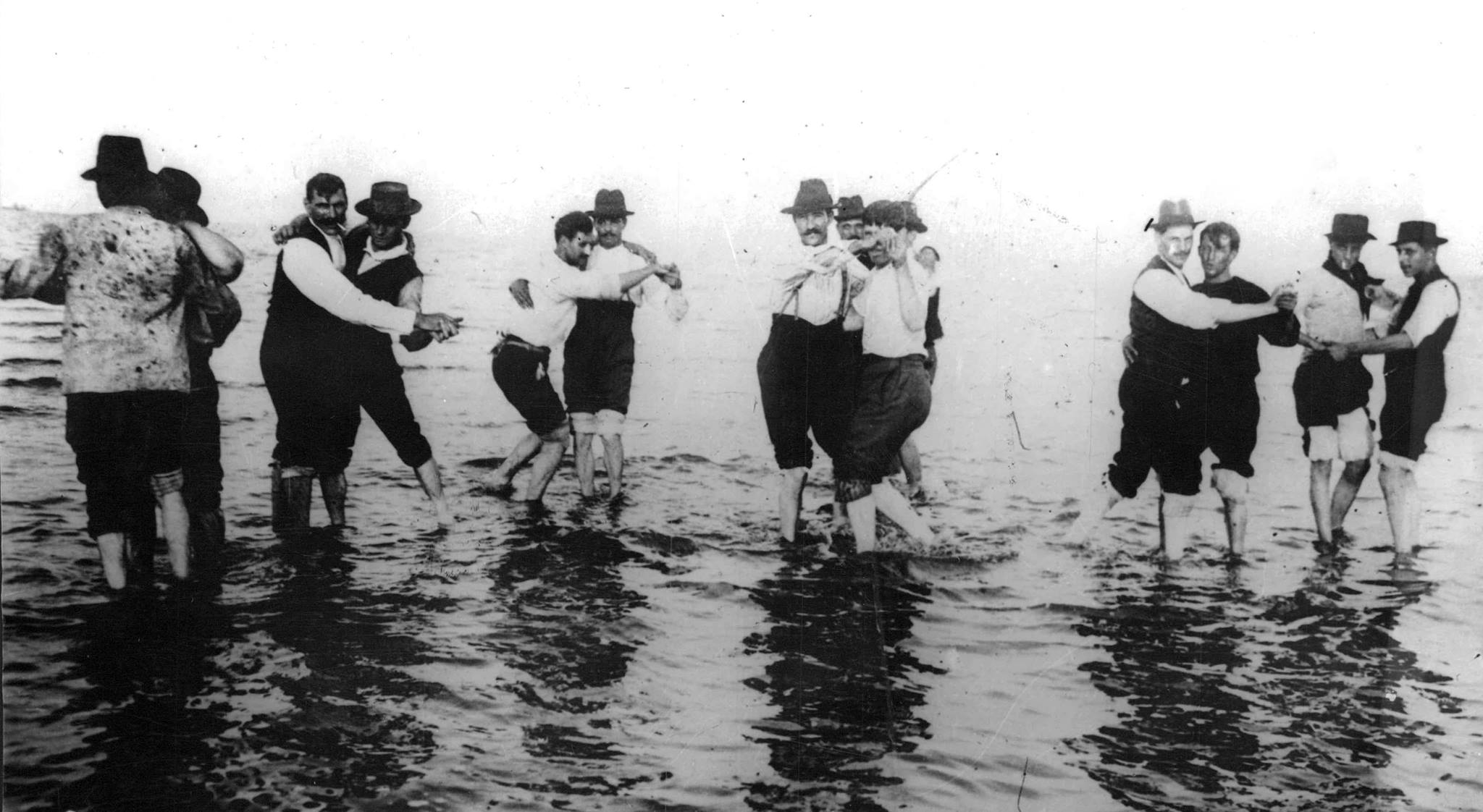
Several men dancing the tango on the banks of the Río de la Plata, 1904.

The Argentine tango, as a dance, was developed by the end of the 19th century among men, and by men that danced with other men in streets and brothels:

The society that begins to dance tango was mainly male, and thus, in public, it was danced by two men only, as the [Catholic] church applied its morals, and did not allow the union of a man and a woman in this type of dance [...] The Pope Pius X banished it, the Kaiser outlawed it to his officers. (Note: Own translation from original: La sociedad en la cual se comienza a bailar tango era mayoritariamente masculina, por la tanto, a la luz pública se bailaba entre parejas de hombres únicamente, ya que la iglesia aplicaba su moralismo y no permitía la unión de un hombre y una mujer en esta clase de baile. [...] El Papa Pío X lo proscribió, el Káiser lo prohibió a sus oficiales.)

— Juliana Hernández Berrío: El Tango nació para ser bailado.

At the beginning of the 1910s the tango was discovered by Europeans, and became fashionable in Paris, but as a dance between man and woman, in a more "decent" style, without "cortes y quebradas". Historical postcards of the 1920s and 30s also show women dancing tango. But these postcards come from cabarets in Paris, and have a particularly masculine, and voyeur accent.

According to several testimonies, clandestine cross-dressing balls were very popular among middle and upper class gay men in Buenos Aires in the early-to-mid 20th century.

==== Rio Carnival ====
In Brazil, homosexuality was legalized in 1830, and kept it legal in the new penal code of 1890. But there were many different laws about public indecency, vagrancy, transvestism, or "libertine" behavior that were used to control, and repress homosexuals. But once a year, during the Carnival, the social mores relaxed, allowing transvestism, and dancing among men —and women—, beginning in the 1930s. The costumes in the Rio Carnival became more and more elaborate, and a jury begun to give prizes to the best; these shows evolved into full balls, where only 10% of the dancers were dressed as drag queens.

=== Russia ===
There are reports of gay balls (baly zhenonenavistnikov, literally "balls of woman-haters") in Russia before the I World War, specifically in Moscow. These balls, even though they were celebrated in the zhenonenavistnik ("woman-haters") subculture, a hyper-masculine group of homosexuals, also accepted cross-dressers.

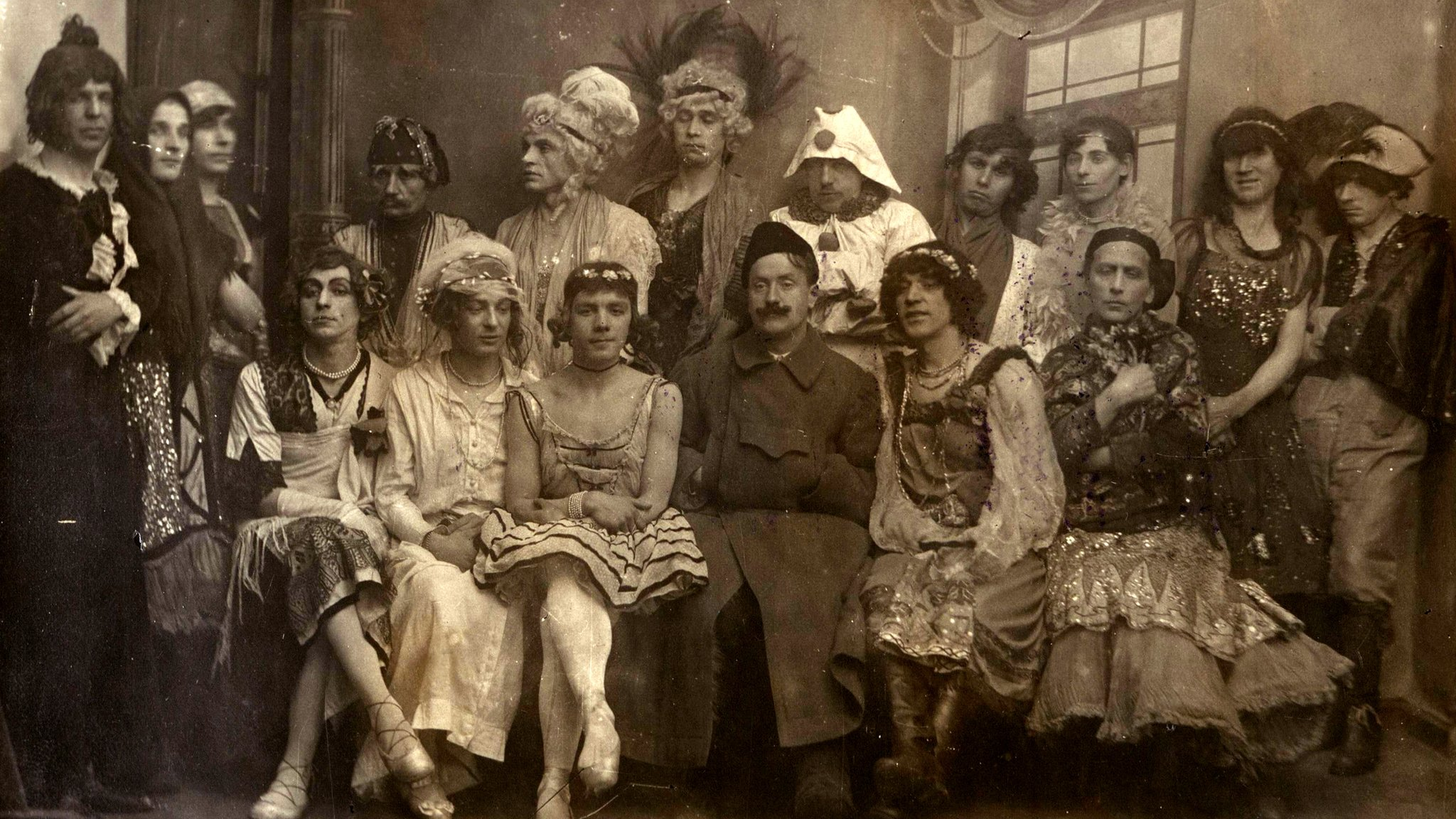
Members of a clandestine gay group in Petrograd, in 1921

In 2013 a photograph (to the right) was published for the first time: it depicts a group of cross-dressed men from Petrograd that were celebrating a drag party on February 15, 1921, during the first years of the Soviet regime. The photo was taken by the forensic experts of the police that had raided the party being held in a private apartment, after receiving an anonymous tip-off about "antinatural activities" in a house in the Simeon street, number 6. Ninety-eight sailors, soldiers, and civilians were arrested —even though sodomy had been legalized in 1917.

They had met to celebrate a "transvestite wedding", many dressed in feminine gowns, "Spanish dresses", and "white wigs", to dance the waltz and the minuet, and socialize with other men. The responsible Justice Commissar justified the raid saying that a public show of homosexual tendencies could endanger "non mature personalities". Even though none of the participants were condemned, the owner of the apartment was accused of running a brothel, according to article 171 of the Soviet penal code, a felony that could be punished with up to three years of prison, and confiscation of all, or some of the property.

=== Lesbian balls ===
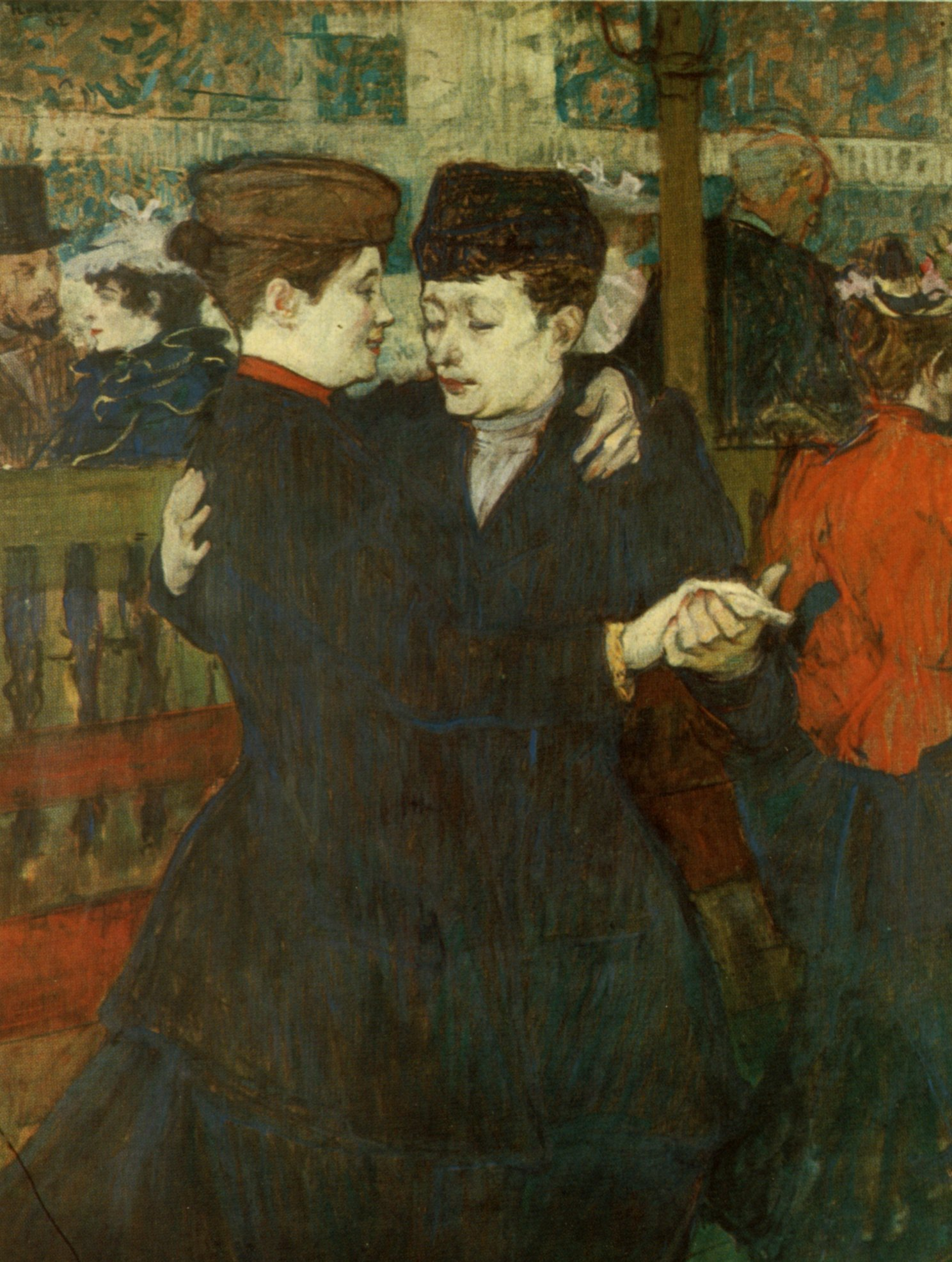
Two women dancing the waltz (c. 1892) by Toulouse Lautrec

Balls for lesbians were also quite common, even though not so much as male ones. Not only were they less in number, but there is less information about them, a problem common to all lesbian history. On the other hand, in western societies, two women dancing together publicly is still acceptable nowadays, and can be done without any suspicions of lesbianism.

In Mexico, on December 4, 1901, shortly after the raid to the Dance of the Forty-One, there was also a police raid of a lesbian ball in Santa María, but the incident had a much smaller social impact than the male equivalent.

Hirschfeld, in his book Berlins drittes Geschlecht (1904), talks also about lesbian balls:

In a big hall, where the uranians celebrate their balls, every week there is an equivalent evening ball for uranierinnen, most of whom participate in men's clothing. Most homosexual women can be found at the same spot every year on the costume ball a lady from Berlin organizes. The ball is not public, but usually only accessible those that are known to one of the ladies on the committee. One of the participants drafts following portrayal: "On a beautiful winter evening, after 8 p.m., cars and cars drive in front of one of the first hotels in Berlin, where ladies and gentlemen descent in costumes of all countries, and epochs. Here you can see a dashing fraternity student with a prominent dueling scar, there a slim rococo gentleman helps gallantly his lady out of the equipage. More and more people fill the brightly lit rooms; now a fat Capuchin enters, to whom bow gypsies, Pierrots, sailors, clowns, bakers, lansquenets, smart officers, ladies and gents in riding gear, Boers, Japanese, and delicate Geishas. A Carmen with fire in her eyes burns a jockey, a passionately hot Italian befriends intimately a snow man. The in brightest colors [dressed] dazzling, happy multitude offers a unique, attractive tableau. The participating women first strengthen themselves on tables decorated with flowers. The director, in a charming velvet jacket, welcomes the guests in a short, sharp speech. Then, the tables are cleared. The "Danubian waves" sound, and accompany the happy dancing couples, that turn the night away in circles. From the neighboring rooms you can hear clear laughter, the clinking of glasses, and animated singing, but nowhere – wherever you look – are the limits of a fine, elegant fancy-dress ball overstepped. No discordant note tarnishes the general happiness, until the last participants leave the place in the dull crepuscular lights of a cold February morning, where for a few hours they could dream themselves as that what they are inside, among those that share their feelings. (Note: Own translation from original text: In einem der großen Säle, in welchem die Urninge ihre Bälle veranstalten, findet auch fast jede Woche ein analoger Ballabend für Uranierinnen statt, von denen sich ein großer Teil in Herrenkostüm einfindet. Die meisten homosexuellen Frauen auf einem Fleck kann man alljährlich auf einem von einer Berliner Dame arrangierten Kostümfest sehen. Das Fest ist nicht öffentlich, sondern gewöhnlich nur denjenigen zugänglich, die einer der Komiteedamen bekannt sind. Eine Teilnehmerin entwirft mir folgende anschauliche Schilderung: »An einem schönen Winterabend fahren von 8 Uhr ab vor einem der ersten Berliner Hotels Wagen auf Wagen vor, denen Damen und Herren in Kostümen aller Länder und Zeiten entsteigen. Hier sieht man einen flotten Couleurstudenten mit mächtigen Renommierschmissen ankommen, dort hilft ein schlanker Rokokoherr seiner Dame galant aus der Equipage. Immer dichter füllen sich die strahlend erleuchteten weiten Räume; jetzt tritt ein dicker Kapuziner ein, vor dem sich ehrfurchtsvoll Zigeuner, Pierrots, Matrosen, Clowns, Bäcker, Landsknechte, schmucke Offiziere, Herren und Damen im Reitanzug, Buren, Japaner und zierliche Geishas neigen. Eine glutäugige Carmen setzt einen Jockey in Brand, ein feuriger Italiener schließt mit einem Schneemann innige Freundschaft. Die in buntesten Farben schillernde fröhliche Schar bietet ein höchst eigenartiges anziehendes Bild. Zuerst stärken sich die Festteilnehmerinnen an blumengeschmückten Tafeln. Die Leiterin in flotter Samtjoppe heißt in kurzer kerniger Rede die Gäste willkommen. Dann werden die Tische fortgeräumt. Die »Donauwellen« erklingen, und begleitet von fröhlichen Tanzweisen, schwingen sich die Paare die Nacht hindurch im Kreise. Aus den Nebensälen hört man helles Lachen, Klingen der Gläser und munteres Singen, nirgends aber – wohin man sieht – werden die Grenzen eines Kostümfestes vornehmer Art überschritten. Kein Mißton trübt die allgemeine Freude, bis die letzten Teilnehmerinnen beim matten Dämmerlicht des kalten Februarmorgens den Ort verlassen, an dem sie sich unter Mitempfindenden wenige Stunden als das träumen durften, was sie innerlich sind.«)

— Magnus Hirschfeld, Berlins Drittes Geschlecht (1904), "Kapitel 3"

Later in Germany, the "bowling club" Die lustige Neun ("The Funny Nine""), created in Berlin in 1924, continued organizing lesbian balls with 200 to 300 women at least until April 1940. It is unknown if the balls, known thanks to the descriptions in the Gestapo files, continued throughout the war years; fact is, the track is lost.

== Later development ==
=== From the World War II to Stonewall in Europe ===
In Switzerland, even with many difficulties, the homosexual movement kept its structures over the war. The Circle, a gay magazine, organized weekly club evenings in Zürich, that only subscribers could visit. Several elaborate systems were used to secure the anonymity of the participants, and only "Rolf", the editor of the magazine, had the names and addresses of everyone. For spring, summer, and fall big balls were organized, and there was also a big costume ball for carnival. An important effort was done to keep everything decent, respectable, and contained, and Rolf made sure that no man under 20 was present. This secrecy mentality was no longer acceptable to gays by the mid-1960s, and in 1967 the magazine and its organization disappeared.

In France, during the occupation of Paris, all balls were prohibited, a situation that did not change after the allies entered the city. During the war, the only possibility was to meet in the outskirts of Paris, as gays did on the Christmas Eve of 1935, when hundreds of men traveled 50 km in a bus from Paris to celebrate the traditional dinner. After the war, the only possibility was to travel by train to the Bal de la Chervrière, in L'Étang-la-Ville, Yvelines, an establishment owned by a lesbian, "la Colonelle", that had been part of the resistance, and had enough contacts to keep her place open.

The situation improved with the reopening of the Bal de la montaigne de Sainte-Geneviève in 1954, organized by Georges Anys, who would keep it open until the 1960s. Possibly the most important ball was the one celebrated every Sunday evening by the magazine and association Arcadie, the Cespala (Club littéraire et scientifique des pays latins), in the number 9 of the Rue Béranger, reserved exclusively to the members of the club.

There was a short revival of the gay pre-war scene after the war in Germany. The Walterchens Ballhaus organized drag balls already in 1946, and the parties at Prince Sasha's were one of the centers of gay nightlife. In Frankfurt, in 1949 reopened the bar Fellsenkeller; the bar had a police permit that allowed men to dance together. By the beginning of the 1950s this revival had been thoroughly eliminated, and gay subculture had disappeared.

After the war, Amsterdam became something of a gay mecca: the biggest gay dance hall in Europe was DOK (De Odeon Kelder), initially belonging to the COC (Cultuur en Ontspanningscentrum, "Center for Culture and Leisure"), it became independent under the direction of Lou Charité three years after. The COC opened then another dance club, De Shakel ("The Chain Link"). The city was quite accepting of these clubs, and gay men from all around the world traveled there for the opportunity to dance freely with other men.

The struggles of the homophile movement to resist the pressure of society and the authorities, trying to gain respectability, and acceptance by passing, but at the same time tying to accommodate the need to socialize, and vent for gay men, can be illustrated by the Café 't Mandje: a small den in gay-accepting Amsterdam's Red-Light District, where prostitutes, pimps, seamen, gays and lesbians came openly together, allowed the dancing of two men only on the Queen's Birthday, once a year, as it did not have a dancing license.

Another example is the origin of the Balletti Verdi affair ("green ballet" (Note: "baletti" means literally ballet, and is the name given at the time to sexual scandals involving minors, from similar heterosexual cases; verde means "green", and it was considered the color of gays; it was the color of the carnation that Oscar Wilde wore on his lapel.)): a series of private parties in Castel Mella, organized by two homosexuals for their friends, became a political scandal of enormous proportions in the Province of Brescia in 1960 when it was discovered that minors —between 18 and 21 years old— had participated. Additionally, the fact that there had been some prostitution going on had disastrous consequences for all the participants, most of them innocent, and ended with three suicides, one man fleeing the city, and many losing their jobs. A subsequent witch hunt against gays in Italy covered the whole land. As late as 1973, in the last years of Franco's dictatorship, ten men were arrested in Sitges, Spain, for going out dancing in women's clothes. The press published their photos in drag, and made snide comments for days, calling them all kinds of names.

=== Ball culture ===
In the U.S., cross-dressing balls evolved into the ballroom community, or ball culture, that started in the Harlem, and in Washington, D.C., in the 1960s.

[black men in the Harlem took the balls to ...] heights undreamed of by the little gangs of white men parading around in frocks in basement taverns. In a burst of liberated zeal they rented big places like the Elks Lodge on 160 West 129th Street, and they turned up in dresses Madame Pompadour herself might have thought twice about. Word spread around Harlem that a retinue of drag queens was putting together outfits bigger and grander than Rose Parade floats, and the balls began to attract spectators, first by the dozens and then by the hundreds, gay and straight alike. People brought liquor with them, sandwiches, buckets of chicken. As the audiences grew, the queens gave them more and more for their money. Cleopatra on her barge, all in gold lamé, with a half dozen attendants waving white, glittering palm fronds. Faux fashion models in feathered coats lined with mylar, so that when the coat was thrown open and a two-thousand-watt incandescent lamp suddenly lit, the people in the first few rows were blinded for minutes afterward.

— Michael Cunningham

Soon the balls were divided in "houses", or "families", led by a charismatic figure.

Some regular house parties became institutionalized as drag "houses" and "families." The leader, or "mother," often provided not only the opportunity for parties but also instruction and mentoring in the arts of make-up, selecting clothes, lip-synching, portraying a personality, walking, and related skills. Those taught became "drag daughters," who in turn mentored others, creating entire "drag families." Drag houses became the first social support groups in the city's gay and lesbian community [in Washington, D.C].

— Rainbow History Project

The ballroom community is still active, as has been documented in the film Paris Is Burning (1990). It has had a notable influence, mainly through Madonna's "Vogue" video, where the dancers use the vogue dancing style, developed in the ball culture, imitating the movements of models on the catwalk. Beyoncé has also mentioned she was influenced by the ball culture, "how inspired she's been by the whole drag-house circuit in the States, an unsung part of black American culture where working-class gay men channel ultra-glamour in mocked-up catwalk shows. 'I still have that in me', she says of the 'confidence and the fire you see on stage [...]'".

=== After Stonewall ===
The Imperial Court of New York's annual Night of a Thousand Gowns Coronation Ball in Times Square

After the Stonewall riots, and the appearance of the modern LGBT liberation movement, these extensive cross-dressing balls, as they had been celebrated until then, practically disappeared. There are a few notable exceptions, as the Life Ball in Vienna, celebrated yearly since 1992, or the annual Night of a Thousand Gowns in New York City, organized by the Imperial Court System, but in general they have been substituted by the dance club.

By the mid-1970s, initially in New York City, appeared the discotheque, with the corresponding disco music, and disc jockeys, in close relationship with the gay scene —see for example Studio 54. Discotheques, and their music soon became favorites of gay men, who found in its songs gay anthems, as It's raining men, Y.M.C.A., I'm coming out, or So many men, so little time, in spite of the homophobia of some of the divas singing.

The mid-1980s saw the appearance of clubbing subculture, with centers in New York City, Ibiza, London, and Paris; one of its most iconic clubs being the Sound Factory in New York City. These clubs usually offered electronic dance music to big masses of gay men. By the end of the decade, and the beginning of the 1990s, the circuit parties appear: big, outdoors parties, similar to raves, very planned, that can go on for days, and that can draw patrons from a very large territory, even from other countries.

Some circuit parties, like the White Party in Palm Springs, the Black and Blue Party in Montreal, and the Winter Party in Miami, attract gay men in the thousands, and the ten thousands. In Europe, the biggest circuit party is celebrated in Barcelona, with about 70,000 men participating.

== Sources ==
- Sternweiler, Andreas (1997). Sternweiler, Andreas; Hannesen, Hans Gerhard (eds.). Goodbye to Berlin? 100 Jahre Schwulenbewegung (in German). Berlin: Verlag Rosa Winkel. pp. 70–74. ISBN 3-86149-062-5.
