= LGBTQ history of the Olympic and Paralympic Games =

Athletes and artists who identify as lesbian, gay, bisexual, transgender, pansexual, non-binary, queer, and/or intersex, and/or who have openly been in a same-sex relationship (LGBTQI+) have competed in the Olympic and Paralympic Games, either openly, or having come out some time afterward.

Alongside the Olympics, international multi-sport events have also been organized specifically for LGBT+ athletes, including the EuroGames, Gay Games and World OutGames.

== Ancient Olympic Games ==
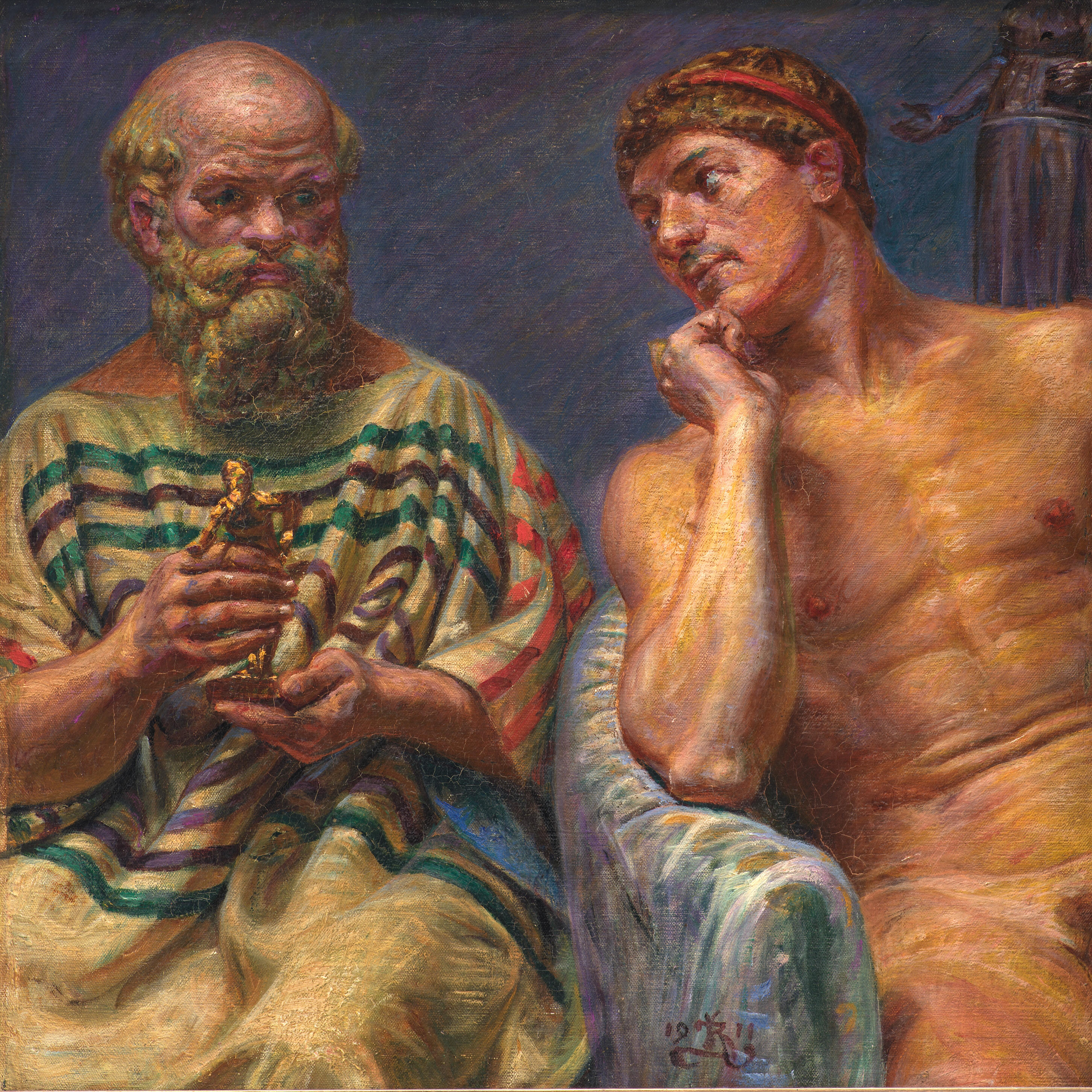
Kristian Zahrtmann's Socrates and Alcibiades, depicting the naked young Alcibiades trying to seduce Socrates as described by Plato

The concept of homosexuality did not exist, at least not as understood in the modern era, in Greece at the time of the ancient Olympic Games. Sexuality was defined by the role one took (active – erastes – or passive – in the case of homosexual relationships, eromenos), rather than by gender, and most men would have taken part in homosexual or pederastic activity. Social roles were connected with the sexual roles, with dominant and adult men to be active and women, young men, and those of low status to be passive. The passive role in men was associated with effeminacy, supposedly an undesirable trait in adults. However, sometimes these roles were flouted, with dominant adult men continuing to have homosexual relationships. Classicist Kenneth Dover has suggested that there would have been social stigma aimed at the passive male in an adult homosexual relationship.

David Stone Potter has discussed the prevailing sexuality in the culture of athletics in ancient Greece, saying that some gymnasiums had to ban men attending purely to pick up other men. Pederasty in sports was elegised by Theognis of Megara in writing "Happy is the lover who, after spending time in the gymnasium, goes home to sleep all day long with a beautiful, young man." Classicists have noted the development of a specific athletic pederasty in the seventh century BC, with Thomas F. Scanlon writing that "the high value placed on an athletic type of physical beauty and nudity contributed to the establishment of gymnnasia and the sanctioning of homosexuality among athletes". Scanlon suggested that widespread pederasty in Greece may have originally arisen due to the practice occurring frequently in gymnasiums, where it was more accepted.

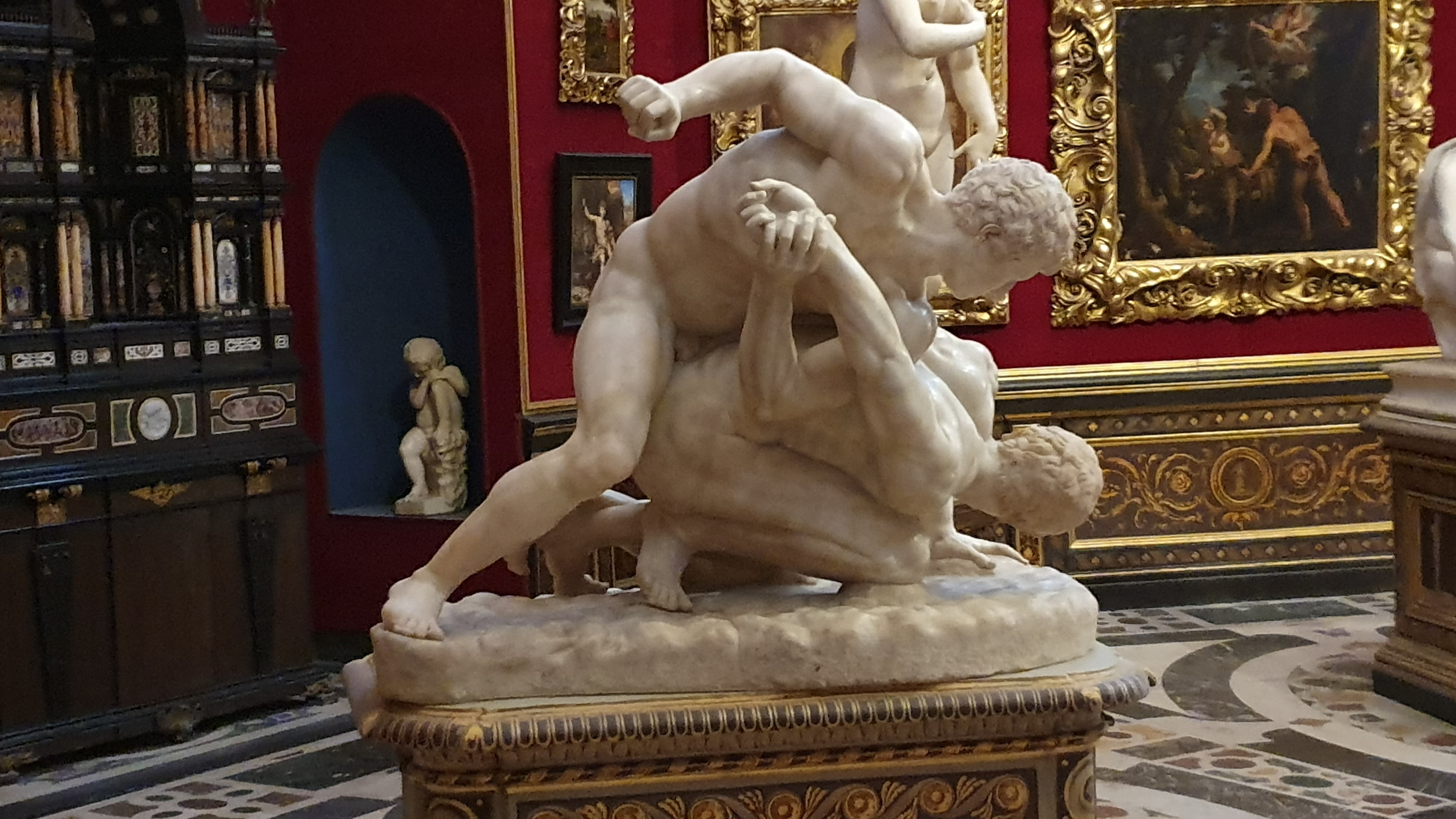
The Uffizi's Wrestlers, a replica of an ancient Greek sculpture depicting pankratiasts, has been subject to much homoerotic appreciation.

Historians have also commented on elements of sexuality within the context of the ancient Olympic Games specifically. Author and Olympic historian Tony Perrottet has said that while Greek poets wrote odes to the bodies of the men, contemporaneous cultures like the Persians and the Egyptians thought the concept of naked men engaging in physical activity together "promoted sexual degeneracy". The ancient Olympic Games were undertaken in the nude, though this was not initially the case. Historians have connected this nudity to the tradition of men entering adulthood parading naked as a rite of passage. Emeritus professor Nick Fisher wrote that "men believed that nakedness… should reveal the perfection of the trained body and that an erotic response to muscular, bronzed bodies gleaming with olive oil, like statues, was a natural part of the admiration elicited by divinely gifted beauty and skills." Anthropologist Greg Laden described the ancient Olympics as "a softly pornographic group voyeuristic tournament".

Some Ancient Olympians noted for stigmatised adult relationships include the general and statesman Alcibiades, a successful Olympic chariot racer (taking first, second and fourth in 416 BC) who had a much-studied relationship with Socrates, also notoriously having many mistresses; and stadion run winner Diocles of Corinth, who moved to Thebes to live with Philolaus of Corinth (of the Bacchiadae) and would be buried with him. In Thebes, Philolaus was a legislator who successfully advocated for adult male unions. Pythagoras of Samos was turned away from the boys' boxing contest and made to compete with the men, while being mocked for being effeminate; he also won the event. Gymnast Iccus of Taranto and pankratiast Kleitomachos were instead known for their abstinence, Kleitomachos supposedly to the point that he could not stand to even hear sex mentioned.

During the height of the popularity of the Olympics, many Greek athletes would spend significant periods of the Olympiad training in specific conditions – historian David Henry James Larmour noted ten months and Eusebius wrote that, during his time, it was sixteen months – including "apparently" having to abstain from sexual intercourse with women.

== Summer Olympic Games LGBT+ history ==
=== 1896–1936 ===
==== Early years ====
There is a recorded upsurge in both male and female homosexuality in France towards the end of the 19th century, with institutionalised homophobia increasing at the start of the 20th century in correlation. French academic and gay rights activist Louis-Georges Tin noted in 2008 that "from its origin, the Olympic movement produced homophobic residue", citing an essay written by modern Olympic Games founder Pierre de Coubertin from the time, in which Coubertin wrote that sport was the way to restore a man's correct "virile sensibility". Coubertin had previously proposed, in 1887, that school education should be more focused around sport to divert students from sexual perversion. In founding the modern Olympics, he did not allow provisions for women to compete, having said that women taking part in sport makes them ugly to men and so is unnatural.

Despite this, the first Olympic athlete known to be gay was a Frenchman from the fin de siècle; Robert de Montesquiou was a writer and socialite who also rode horses and won the bronze medal in the 1900 Hacks and hunter combined, the only time this event was contested. By 1912, there were few other gay Olympic athletes, one of whom was Niels Bukh, who coached his gymnastic team to a gold medal.

==== Interwar years ====
LGBTQ+ Olympic historian Tony Scupham-Bilton traced gay Olympic athletes back to at least 1928 in a report produced for Outsports in 2016; the athlete in question was Weimar German runner Otto Peltzer, who lived openly gay, though this was not known worldwide; Peltzer set world records in the 1920s and was a prominent international athlete, but did not perform well at the Olympics. Peltzer was able to live openly within the Weimar Republic as, despite homosexuality technically being illegal, it flourished in culture and society of the interwar period, particularly in Berlin. One of the most prominent cultural figures in this period was Renée Sintenis, an openly queer and androgynous artist who won a bronze medal and would be one of seventeen known LGBTQ+ artists to compete in the artistic events at the Olympics in the interwar years, (Note: See List of LGBT Olympians) including fellow German gay icon Ludwig von Hofmann.

A similar flourishing of gay life existed in certain urban communities of the United States in the 1920s, and there were also a significant number of LGBTQ+ Americans appearing at the Games during this period; Babe Didrikson Zaharias, a lesbian considered the 20th century's best female golfer, won two gold medals and a silver in athletics at the 1932 Olympic Games.

==== Nazi Olympics ====
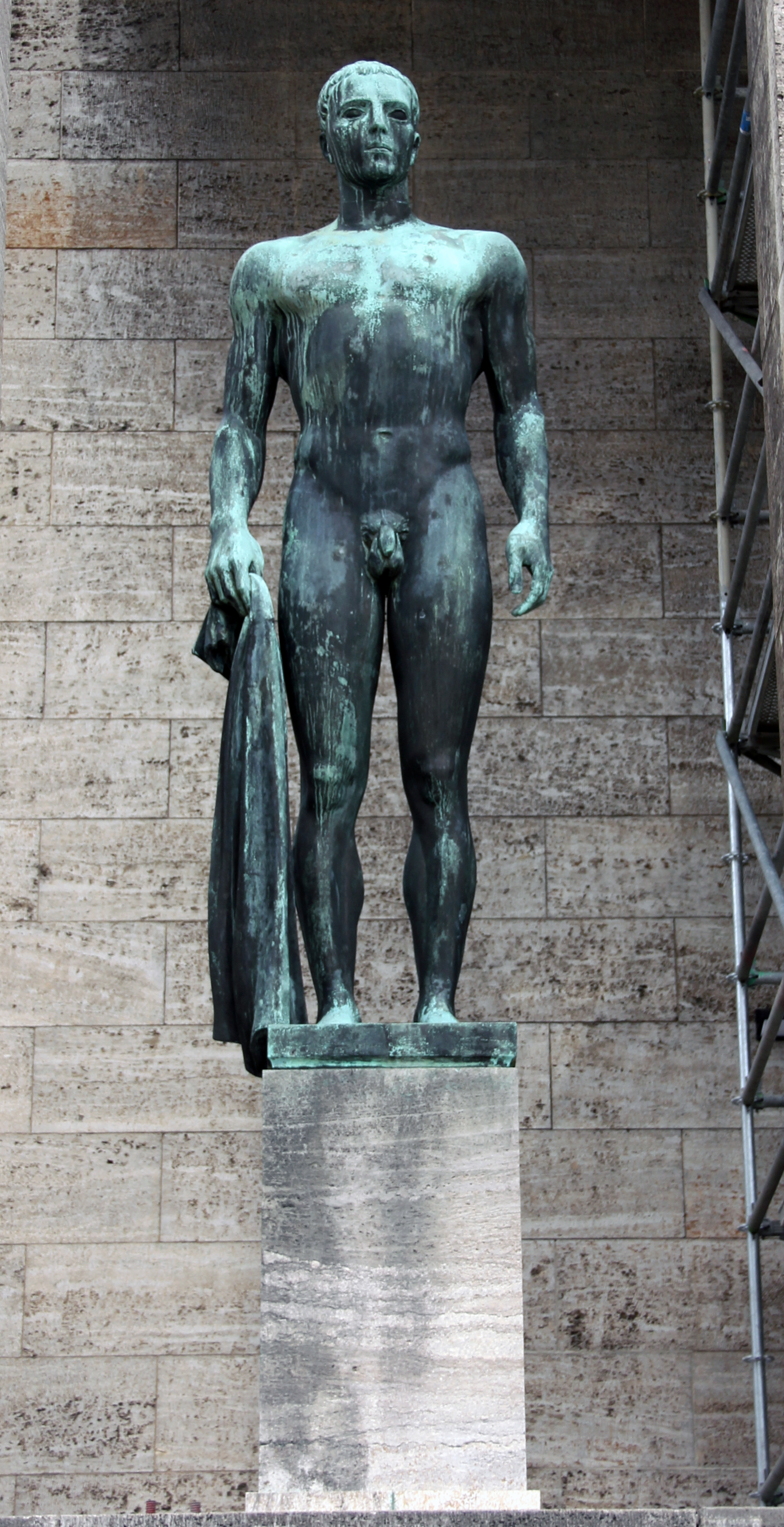
Breker's decathlete statue

The impact of the rise of Nazism and its attitude towards homosexuality affected the Olympics in the run-up to and at the 1936 Olympic Games. In 1935, Peltzer was arrested, banned from sport, and eventually sent to a concentration camp. Sintenis lived in exile, with her artwork labelled Degenerate.

The Nazis took the chance to use their Games to promote some of their ideology through depicting the ideal Aryan man as a successful Olympic athlete. Since his first Games appearance, closeted sculptor Arno Breker had become a favourite of Adolf Hitler and was commissioned to produce statues for the Games. His artwork is known as both homoerotic and Nazi state propaganda, deliberately evoking ancient Greek aesthetics to promote the supposed Aryan physical supremacy; it reflects the homosocial masculine nature of the Nazi vision of utopia, which, paired with the classical sculptural nudity of antiquity, appeared like "a steamy wonderland in which the male body is always on view." Breker's statue for the Berlin Olympiastadion was recreated in miniature as his silver-medal-winning competition entry; the full size version features its nude decathlete holding a towel, while the smaller version does not. Another gay Olympian who was supported by Hitler and used for his propaganda was Bukh, invited to demonstrate his gymnastic programme and ideal male physique at the Games; Bukh's support of Nazism, potentially in light of Hitler's support of him, caused an unimpressed ex-lover to out him. Violette Morris, a French athlete of many sports who had long been openly lesbian, was another guest of Hitler's at the 1936 Games; she had been banned by her country from competing in 1928 because of her sexuality, and would later become a Nazi collaborator in occupied France.

Cultural superiority was also supposed to be on display at the 1936 Games, and also prominently involved LGBTQ+ Germans; artists other than Breker were encouraged by the Nazis to exhibit and compete for Nazi German glory. The famed dancers and choreographers Harald Kreutzberg, gay and androgynous, and Mary Wigman, probably bisexual, were the main architects of the showcase, which was run as a demonstration event. After the Games, Wigman was also labelled Degenerate.

At the 1936 Games, there were several noted incidents of sex verification among athletes in women's events. It was rudimentary, did not result in exclusions, and may have been biased; Helen Stephens said that, after she and Stella Walsh were both accused of being men, Hitler grabbed at her to confirm she was biologically female. It is not known if Walsh was similarly checked, but a later autopsy would show that Walsh had intersex characteristics, as did German athlete Heinrich Ratjen (competing as Dora Ratjen); Stephens and Walsh won medals, while Ratjen did not. Ratjen, who competed as female but identified as male, was later banned from sport by his country, though also claimed he had been made to compete as female so that Nazi Germany had a better chance of winning.

=== 1948–1996 ===
==== Post-war period ====
In 1948, the last artistic events were contested, and the last contemporaneously out Olympian would be seen until 1984. Mirroring society and the sporting world at large, the later decades of the 20th century saw significant homophobia as well as lack of sexual education; it has been reported that between 1950 and 1990, "many gay individuals ... thought they were the only gay person in the world," a sentiment reported among male Olympians. While homosexuality was no longer listed as an illness by the American Psychological Association from 1973, and activism emerged, there was widespread discrimination. The 1976 Summer Olympics held in Canada saw a programme called "ville propre", with police raiding gay bars and other known homosexual hang-outs, enforcing conservatism.

==== AIDS and Gay Games ====
The AIDS epidemic, which was declared an epidemic in 1981, saw a mixture of responses: from some parties there was more empathy for homosexual and bisexual men, and an outpouring of support; from others, there was an increased fear and vitriol, and sharing of the belief that AIDS was a divine punishment for a gay lifestyle. The Gay Games, founded by gay former Olympian Tom Waddell, began in 1982, as a safe space for LGBTQ+ athletes to compete. The acceptance among athletes from the Gay Games is said to have crossed over into the Olympics; also including non-Olympic LGBTQ+ athletes, the Gay Games showed the world and Olympic movement that there are significant numbers of queer people in sport. Reportedly, being able to see "gay athletes in a highly organised event similar to the Olympic Games" caused attitudes to change in sport.

There was at least one contemporaneously out male LGBTQ+ athlete at each Summer Olympic Games from 1984 to 1996, with a steady increase over the period.

=== 2000–present ===
At the end of the 20th century, after the crest of the AIDS crisis, significant media attention in the United States was given to promoting LGBTQ+ equality, and positive cultural depictions of LGBTQ+ people returned to the mainstream in Western nations, which helped to normalise not just gay people, but moreover the act of coming out itself, to people in these countries. In the early years of the 21st century, various Western nations decriminalised sodomy and legalised civil partnerships and marriage for same-sex couples. Transgender activism took off, and the internet was said to be a useful tool for popularising and ultimately globalising equality movements.

Transgender athletes were first allowed to compete in 2004.

In the 2008 Summer Olympics in Beijing, only 15 athletes out of the 10,708 participants were openly gay, lesbian or bisexual. Of them only two, including Matthew Mitcham (who also won a gold medal, making him the first openly gay Olympic champion), were male. Mitcham gained media coverage in Australia as reporters thought he was the first Australian to compete in the Olympics as an openly gay person at the time. However, Mathew Helm, the Australian diver who won the silver medal at the 2004 Summer Olympics in the men's 10m platform, had publicly announced he was gay before the Olympics began. Other notable gay Australian Olympians include Ji Wallace, who competed at the 2000 Summer Olympics and won a silver medal in the inaugural trampoline event; however, he came out after the Games. Patricia Nell Warren noted in 2008 that, besides some notable faces, most out Olympians (even medalists) were still being overlooked both for their athletic achievements and by the LGBTQ+ community. She said that the courage in coming out and opening themselves to homophobia in sport should be more openly acknowledged. Mike Horton, a spokesperson for amateur gay sports in the United States, suggested that simply coming out and winning would not create a legacy of inspiring LGBTQ+ children to enter sports on its own, that the athletes would have to become public advocates.

Ahead of the 2012 Summer Olympics, the organising committee had included diversity and acceptance in its bid, and approached LGBT+ athletes to encourage participation.

In the 2012 Summer Olympics in London, 23 athletes out of the 10,768 participants were openly gay, lesbian or bisexual. LOCOG was the first organizing committee in Olympic history to include a commitment to diversity in its bid. The organizers publicly supported pro-LGBTQ concerns during the lead-up to the Games, such as during Pride London 2010, when special pins featuring the Games' emblem and a rainbow flag were sold as part of a wider range celebrating various aspects of diversity. LOCOG chief executive Paul Deighton stated that its vision was "as bold as it is simple – to use the power of the Games to inspire change. We want to reach out to all parts of the community and connect them with London 2012".

A slightly larger number of LGBTQ athletes competed in London, with 23 out of more than 10,000 competitors, and only three gay men. Outsports co-founder Jim Buzinski considered it to be an "absurdly low number", and considered that in comparison to the arts, politics or business worlds, "sports is still the final closet in society".

In the 2016 Summer Olympics in Rio de Janeiro, a record 68 athletes out of the 10,444 participants were openly gay, lesbian or bisexual, nearly double the LGBTQ athletes who took part in the 2012 Summer Olympics. There were no openly transgender athletes, but Rolling Stone magazine reported that two transgender athletes would compete in Rio, based on anonymous details in IOC papers. 51 women and 18 men - who are now openly LGBTQ - competed in this Olympiade (some came out afterwards). One other LGBTQ athlete was known to compete at the time, but did not wish to be identified due to still being in the closet. The Games also featured the first same-sex married couple to compete, Helen and Kate Richardson-Walsh, British field hockey players.

==== "Rainbow Olympics" ====
The 2020 Summer Olympics, delayed by the COVID-19 pandemic and held in summer 2021 in Tokyo, was nicknamed the "Rainbow Olympics" due to not only the significant increase in openly LGBTQ+ athletes, but also for many of these athletes desiring visibility or taking activist stances. There were three times as many openly queer athletes at Tokyo as there were in Rio, with Outsports able to name at least 185 publicly out LGBTQ+ athletes by the end of the Games, more contemporaneously out athletes than all previous Summer and Winter Games combined. Despite this, the percentage of LGBTQ+ individuals among all athletes at Tokyo was still lower than that in the general population. There was also the first appearances of out transgender athletes at Tokyo, with one of these (Canadian soccer player Quinn) winning a gold medal, making them the first openly transgender Olympic champion.

== Winter Olympic Games LGBT+ history ==
Figure skater John Curry is sometimes considered the first out Winter Olympian, being outed by the media after his gold medal-winning performance at the 1976 Winter Olympics. Other skaters were reportedly outed before the closing ceremony in 1976. The global figure skating community was heavily affected by the AIDS epidemic, with few or no known gay Winter Olympians by the early 1990s due to the AIDS-related deaths of several (including Curry), and others remaining closeted due to stigma. Already associated with femininity, figure skating was branded a gay sport, causing U.S. Figure Skating to state that it is not more "heavily weighted toward homosexuals ... than any other sport" and that they considered sexuality irrelevant anyway.

Of the 2,566 athletes who participated in the 2010 Winter Olympics in Vancouver, only six athletes, all women, were openly lesbian or bisexual. This was the first Olympic competition to host a Pride House, something which resumed at the Winter Olympics in 2026.

=== 2014–present ===
Between 2014 and 2022, the Winter Olympics were exclusively held in nations with no anti-discrimination protections for LGBTQ+ people: Russia, South Korea, and China. Particularly in anticipation of the Russia-hosted Sochi 2014 Games, there was defiance, with athletes and representatives from nations with LGBTQ+ protections openly protesting Russia's laws, and using rhetoric to promote their pro-LGBT+ stance. Between 2011 and 2014 in the United States, sporting culture saw a pro-LGBTQ+ stance become aligned with a pro-Western values, and thus pro-American, position when set in contrast to Russia, with sponsors aligning themselves with this stance for the Olympics and maintaining it within the regular sporting calendar afterwards. In the face of Western-aligned Olympic committees being called to boycott, Belle Brockhoff, who had chosen to come out ahead of competing in Sochi, was said to exemplify the feeling of many athletes in saying: "After I compete, I'm willing to rip on [Putin's] ass. I'm not happy and there's a bunch of other Olympians who are not happy either." The sentiment was seen as athletes wanting to compete and to then make statements while in Russia.

Sixteen out athletes — twelve women and four men — participated in the 2018 Winter Olympics in Pyeongchang, South Korea. It marked the first time in the history of the Winter Olympics that male athletes competed who were openly gay; Canadian figure skater Eric Radford became the first out gay male athlete ever to win a Winter Olympic gold medal, while figure skater Adam Rippon became the first American out gay male athlete ever to win a Winter Olympic medal, both in Team Figure Skating. Radford later also won Bronze in Pairs Figure Skating. A fifth male athlete, Guillaume Cizeron, came out after the event.

According to Outsports, at least 36 publicly out LGBTQ+ athletes competed in the 2022 Winter Olympics in Beijing. Timothy LeDuc of the United States became the first openly non-binary athlete to compete in a Winter Olympics.

While Italy, host nation of the 2026 Winter Olympics, was not considered hostile to LGBTQ+ people, it was reported to, like the United States by this point, be "going backwards" in regards to LGBTQ+ rights and protections. The 2026 Pride House, and out athletes, spoke of the importance of using its presence to advocate for such rights.

== Paralympic Games LGBTQ+ history ==
LGBTQ+ Paralympic athletes face stigma in sport from being disabled and from being queer, with lesbian Paralympic swimmer Edênia Garcia writing that the combination is a "stigma of being invisible". British Paralympians Robyn Love and Laurie Williams have spoken about using their platform to provide visibility for LGBT athletes with disabilities – with an aim to dispel stereotypes of what lesbians and disabled people have to look and be like – and David Hill has said that sport gave him the confidence to embrace his queerness and disability, but he was still scared to come out to others within swimming. Despite growing numbers of out LGBTQ Paralympians with each Summer event in the 21st century, the media coverage of these athletes was significantly lower than the vastly growing coverage of LGBTQ Olympians, if present at all. Fusion suggested that besides low coverage causing a self-justifying lack of interest, there may be a failure to report on the intersection of Paralympians who are queer due to wider media treatment of Paralympians as disabled tropes and societal perceptions of disabled people as desexualised.

Like with LGBTQ+ Olympic athletes, there have been more openly queer Summer than Winter Paralympians. Unlike with Olympians, however, the number of out LGBTQ+ Winter Paralympians has, as of 2022, been constantly stagnant rather than gradually increasing. Fusion suggested this may be related to the Winter Games being held in homophobic nations and greater fear among double marginalised LGBTQ+ Paralympians to be publicly out, with discrimination cited as a reason there are fewer out Paralympians than Olympians across both seasons despite significant prevalence of disability in the queer community. From an initial two out Summer Paralympians in 2012, this rose to at least twelve in 2016 and thirty-six in 2020; there have been only one or two out Winter Olympians over the same time frame.

== Pride Houses ==
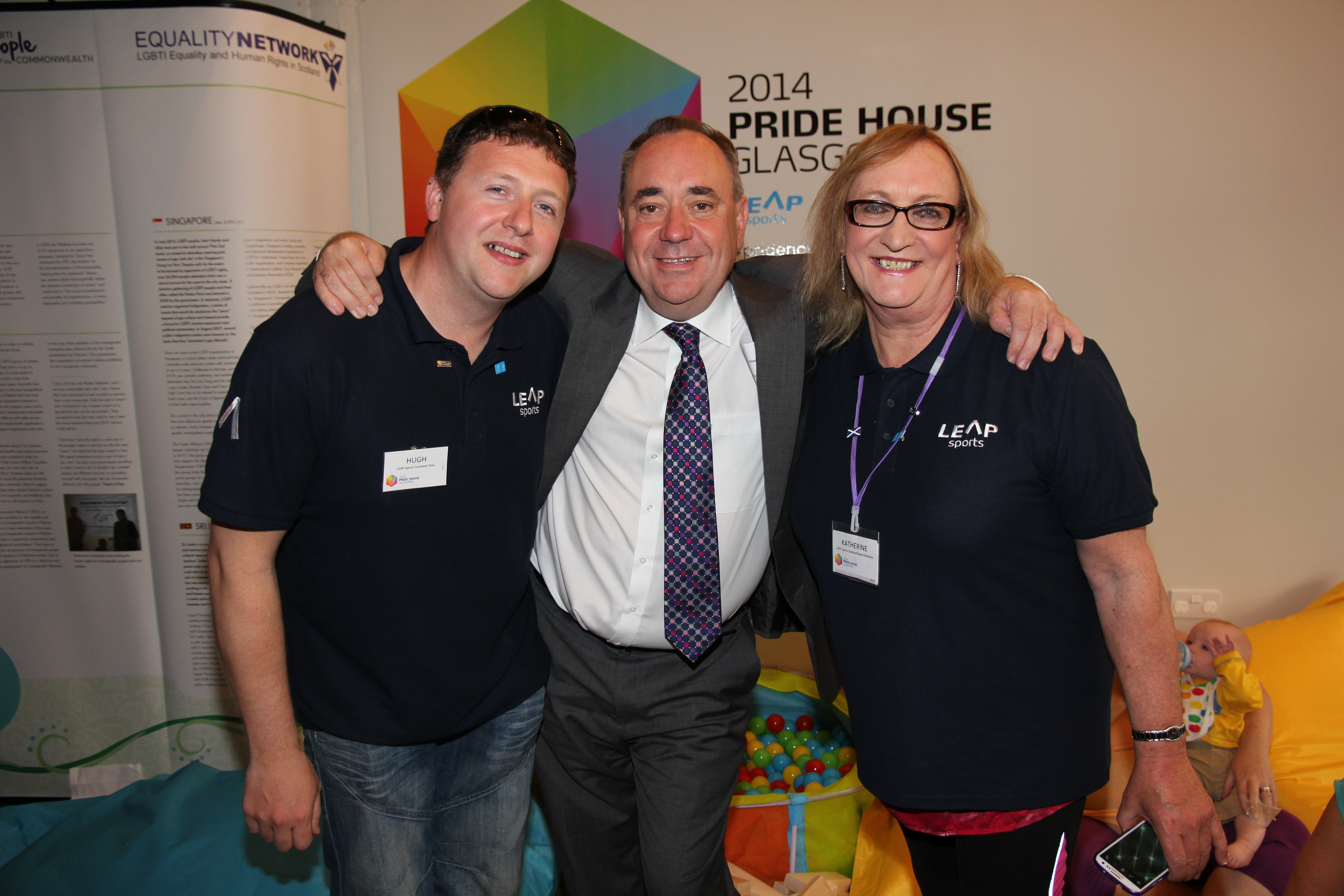
First Minister of Scotland Alex Salmond opening Pride House Glasgow in 2014

Pride Houses are a dedicated temporary location designed to play host to LGBTQ+ athletes, volunteers and visitors attending the Olympics, Paralympics or other international sporting event in the host city. The first attempt to organize a Pride House was for the 1992 Barcelona Olympics; the first that happened was for the Vancouver 2010 Winter Olympics. Both Pride Houses at Vancouver (one in the city, one in the mountains in Whistler) offered information and support services to LGBTQ+ athletes and attendees, with the Whistler location in Pan Pacific Village Centre also having a "celebratory theme", and the Vancouver venue emphasising education about Vancouver's LGBT community and, for non-Canadian athletes, information about immigration to and asylum in Canada, including "legal resources" from Egale Canada and the International Lesbian, Gay, Bisexual, Trans and Intersex Association (ILGA).

An attempt to create a Pride House at the 2014 Winter Olympics in Sochi, Russia was struck down by the Ministry of Justice, which refused to approve the registration of the NGO set up to organize the Pride House. The ban was upheld by Krasnodar Krai Judge Svetlana Mordovina on the basis of the Pride House inciting "propaganda of non-traditional sexual orientation which can undermine the security of the Russian society and the state, provoke social-religious hatred, which is the feature of the extremist character of the activity".

As it became clear that no Pride House could take place in Sochi, a number of leading LGBTQ+ sports organisations worked together to promote the idea of cities elsewhere hosting their own Pride Houses during the Sochi Olympics. Pride House Toronto, which was set to be the largest Pride House ever and preparing to host visitors during the 2015 Pan American Games at the time of the Sochi Olympics, was already very advanced with its plans for a series of events during the Sochi Olympics highlighting the anti-LGBTQ+ laws and LGBTQ+ rights in Russia in general. In addition to Pride House Toronto, a group led by Pride Sports UK hosted other Pride Houses, with Manchester being the largest. Other cities across North America, Western Europe, New Zealand, and Brazil, also expressed interest in hosting Pride Houses during the Sochi Olympics.

== Sport and gender statistics ==
The vast majority of openly LGBTQ+ Olympians are female; of these, most are lesbians. At both Tokyo 2020 and Paris 2024, out female athletes outnumbered the out men by about 9:1. Outsports felt that the low percentage, 0.3% at Tokyo 2020, of male athletes being openly LGBTQ+ was not a true reflection of the percentage of men within sport who are LGBTQ+, instead suggesting that a sporting culture keeps men closeted. Short of 2% of all athletes at Tokyo 2020 were openly LGBTQ+, which was also deemed lower than the statistics in the world at large, with the deficiency similarly attributed to homophobic sporting culture. Monash University behavioural scientist Erik Denison said, in response to the statistics, that male sports are stereotyped to a particular image of masculinity, while female sports are stereotyped to an image of aggression that defies femininity and assumes the participants are lesbians.

Outsports noted that the majority of the out male athletes were "equestrian or in a pool", with the equestrian and aquatic sports accounting for nearly 60% of out male athletes. In winter sport, figure skating is a sport that has been stereotyped as having many gay male athletes, though accounts also say men in figure skating have been closeted due to homophobia within the sport, the fear judges will down mark anything non-traditional, and fear of losing sponsors; without outing any athletes in particular, insiders have estimated that around half of male Olympic figure skating medalists are LGBTQ+.

In women's sport, football is noted as having high numbers of out athletes, though this has been argued to have created prejudice against women's football itself because of the assumption all players are lesbians and the preexisting prejudice towards lesbians. The event with the highest number of out LGBTQ+ Olympic athletes is football, nearly all women. One suggestion in a Sportscotland review was that athletes are more likely to come out if they participate in a sport that is stereotypically queer, giving examples of men's figure skating and women's football.

== Success ==
Approximately half of all LGBTQ+ Olympians have won an Olympic medal. Outsports reported that of the 104 openly gay and lesbian participants in the Summer Olympics up to and including 2012 (and publicly out by 2014), 53% had won a medal. Including only those out ahead of the 2012 Games, LGBTQ+ athletes that year were six times as likely to win a gold medal compared to all athletes. Cyd Zeigler, founder of Outsports, suggested that this could be the result of the relieved focus and lack of "burden" an athlete would have after coming out; that "high-level athletes" are more likely to feel secure in coming out as their careers have been established; or their performance was mere coincidence and had no correlation with their sexual orientation at all. University of Winchester sociology and sexology researcher Eric Anderson has found that the comparative success of out LGBTQ+ athletes can be related to them only feeling comfortable to come out when they "have the sporting capital to negate the problems they encounter".

Mark Tewksbury and Greg Louganis, who were among the best in their sports, remarked that feeling personally accepted enough to share their sexuality may have been the psychological burden relieved to allow them to improve. Curler Bruce Mouat has said that, in his team sport, he found that coming out made him more emotionally available and improved his dynamic with his team, seeing them to medal success. Various athletes have reported improved results after coming out, even privately, and some of the most successful sportspeople of their times have been LGBTQ+ and competed at the Olympics.

== Visibility and recognition ==
The importance of having visible out LGBTQ+ athletes at the Olympics has been noted due to the global nature of the event and the potential for cultural exchange, with athletes from less progressive nations able to positively interact with openly queer athletes and take their experiences back to their own countries. Outsports, the main reference website covering queer athletes and which gives a platform to many coming-out stories from sports personalities, has the tagline "courage is contagious", expressing that visibility is vital for sports at large to become more welcoming to the LGBTQ+ community, and as inspiration for other people to come out. Research published in the Journal of Homosexuality suggested that, in the 2010s, more social attention was given to already-successful athletes who came out, particularly those with Olympic or world championship success, than to athletes who were less prominent when they came out. Europe-wide research published in 2019 found that 70% of queer people surveyed considered "famous sport stars" coming out to be key in tackling homophobia and transphobia in sports.

== LGBT+ legislation in host cities ==
=== Montreal 1976 ===
In the years before the 1976 Summer Olympics in Montreal, Quebec, Canada, the nation began somewhat re-criminalising gay sexual activities (officially decriminalised, a law against prostitution was instead applied) and, in February 1975, began enforcing this in Quebec and Ontario, and also actively seeking out people in Montreal suspected of homosexuality to arrest, generally for immorality or as supposed security threats, in a "clean city" ("ville propre") campaign. Gay sex was labelled a vice, with the Royal Canadian Mounted Police being brought in to raid known gay and lesbian spaces, sometimes violently, including bars and bathhouses. Sport and gender activist Helen Lenskyj wrote that the move "suggested a kind of puritanical embarrassment at the prospect that Olympic visitors might actually see gay men and lesbians on the streets"; the Montreal Organising Committee worked with the local politicians, with their official stance being that "all non-conforming elements of which homosexuals are included, must be confined and made hidden". Though activist groups were also targeted, the "clean-up" campaign has otherwise been described as an ardent form of moral cleansing and sexual policing. Rather than intimidate the queer population out of the city as hoped, it instead resulted in new anti-repression activist groups being founded and the largest Canadian gay rights protests ever at the time being held.

=== Sochi 2014 ===
In the 2014 Winter Olympics in Sochi, Russia, seven openly gay women competed. Russia's stance on LGBTQ+ rights were a major concern during the lead-up to these Games; in 2012, an attempt to obtain a Pride House was denied, and, in June 2013, Russia became the subject of international criticism after it passed a federal "gay propaganda law", which made it a criminal offence to distribute materials classified as "propaganda of non-traditional sexual relationships" among minors. Russia attempted to quell concerns about the propaganda law by allowing designated protest zones during the Games; media found this unsatisfactory.

=== 2014 anti-discrimination provision ===
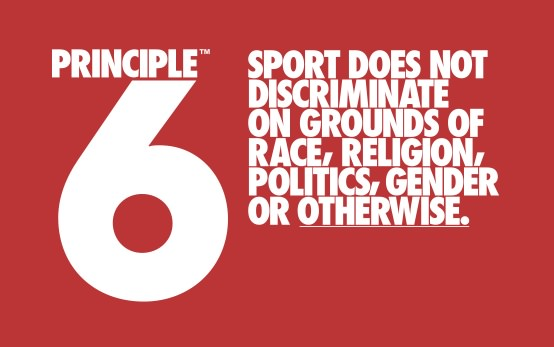
Principle 6

Marc Naimark of the Federation of Gay Games called "the lack of openly gay athletes" a symptom, not the problem, of the Olympic Games. He said the IOC should pressure countries to repeal anti-gay laws the same way it once excluded South Africa for its apartheid system of racial segregation, and "more recently, succeeded in getting all competing nations to include female athletes on their teams in London [2012]". In 2014, after that year's Winter Olympics were held in Russia, the IOC amended its host city contracts for the 2022 Winter Olympics to include an anti-discrimination provision based on Principle 6 of the Olympic Charter (which itself includes sexual orientation).

=== Tokyo 2020 ===
Though the 2020 Games have been called the "Rainbow Olympics", the media noted that host nation Japan was the only one of the G7 industrialised nations not to allow same-sex marriage, and to not have any openly queer athletes at the Games. In the run-up to the Games, LGBTQ+ activists in Japan had hoped the attention of the world would encourage positive change; an anti-discrimination bill was debated, but did not pass, in the National Diet. While Japan had a political agenda through the 2010s, specifically looking ahead to the Games, to "[encourage] the positive reinterpretation of sexual minorities as important new consumers and a tourist niche", the attempts have been described as based in stereotypes and not substantive.

=== Los Angeles 2028 ===
In February 2025, US president Donald Trump published Executive Order 14201, "Keeping Men Out of Women's Sports", as part of a broader series of actions against transgender people. In March 2026, the IOC banned trans women and intersex athletes from competing in female events at the 2028 Summer Olympics and future Olympic games. White House press secretary Karoline Leavitt lauded the rule change, stating, "President Trump's Executive Order protecting women's sports made this happen!"

== Sex verification and intersex athletes ==
The Olympic Games mandates sex verification of athletes in women's competitions, and has done since the 1930s. In this time, there have been many different regulations for sex testing, as well as different types of tests used. Initial concerns that prompted the approval of suspicion-based sex testing were of national teams exploiting intersex athletes for Olympic success, and testing first became a requirement in the 1960s when many female athletes were doped and it was harder to tell physical differences between them and men.

In its history, different sex testing methods at the Olympics have been known to produce false positive and false negative results, incorrectly excluding some cisgender women. No "male imposters" have ever been identified through sex testing. The IOC re-confirmed the use of sex verification in several meetings in the 1980s and 1990s, each time confirming its use for preventing "male imposters", and not aiming to exclude intersex women.

In March 2026, the IOC banned trans women and intersex athletes from competing in female events at the 2028 Summer Olympics and future Olympic games. All potential Olympic athletes must undergo a one-time SRY screening before being permitted to compete in the female category. IOC president Kirsty Coventry stated that the new policy was "based on science" and was made because "it is absolutely clear that it would not be fair for biological males to compete in the female category".

Sex testing at the Olympics has been criticised for a variety of reasons, and briefly stopped. Various international medical and sports professionals have advocated for the abolition of sex verification in sport, and specifically the Olympics.

== Overview of LGBTQ+ Olympians ==
All based on the Lists of LGBTQ+ Olympians and Paralympians

By country
Country	Number of Olympians			
Country	F	M	NB	Total
Argentina	7	1	—	8
Armenia	—	1	—	1
Australia	52 (Note: Alyson Annan has represented Australia, the Netherlands and China, and is counted for all.)	11	2	65
Austria	5 (Note: Jolanta Ogar represented both Poland and Austria, and is counted for both.)	1	—	6
Belarus	1	—	—	1
Belgium	14	3	—	17
Brazil	60 (Note: Pia Sundhage has represented Sweden, the United States, and Brazil and is counted for all.)	8	—	68
Canada	69	24	2	95
Chile	4	1	—	5
China	3	–	–	3
Colombia	5	—	—	5
Cuba	1 (Note: Yulenmis Aguilar represented both Cuba and Spain, and is counted for both.)	—	—	1
Cyprus	1	—	—	1
Czech Republic (Note: Including Czechoslovakia)	7	3	—	10
Denmark	9	3	—	12
Dominica	1	—	—	1
Estonia	1 (Note: Natalia Zabiiako represented both Estonia and the independent athletes from Russia, and is counted for both.)	—	—	1
Finland	13	1	—	14
France	23	9	—	32
Germany (Note: Including Weimar Republic, Nazi Germany, West Germany and East Germany)	48	9	—	57
Great Britain	59 (Note: Hege Riise represented both Norway and Great Britain, and is counted for both.)	23 (Note: Gus Kenworthy represented both Great Britain and the United States, and is counted for both.)	—	82
Greece	2	1	—	3
Iceland	1	1	—	2
India	1	—	—	1
Ireland (Note: Including Irish Free State)	6	3	—	9
Israel	6	—	—	6
Italy (Note: Including Kingdom of Italy and Fascist Italy)	9	3	—	12
Japan	—	1	—	1
Mexico	3	1	—	4
Netherlands	35	9	—	44
New Zealand	20	6	—	26
Nigeria	1	—	—	1
Norway	16	—	—	16
Peru	1	—	—	1
Philippines	3	1	—	4
Poland	5	2	—	7
Puerto Rico	5	1	—	6
Refugee Olympic Team	1	—	—	1
ROC (Note: Including Russia and the Olympic Athletes from Russia)	4	—	—	4
Singapore	1	—	—	1
Slovenia	1	—	—	1
South Africa (Note: Including Union of South Africa)	16	3	—	19
Spain	17	7	—	24
Sweden	37	4	—	41
Switzerland	3	1	—	4
Thailand	1	—	—	1
Tonga	—	1	—	1
Trinidad and Tobago	1	—	—	1
Turkey	2	—	—	2
United States	150	42	9	201
Venezuela	1	2	—	3
Zimbabwe	—	1	—	1

By year
Games	Number of Olympians (Note: Including multi-year appearances of the same Olympian; including Paralympics.)			
Games	F	M	NB	Total
1900 Summer	—	1	—	1
1904 Summer	—	1	—	1
1908 Summer	—	1	—	1
1912 Summer	—	3	—	3
1924 Summer	—	4	—	4
1928 Summer	5	4	—	9
1932 Summer	5	5	—	10
1936 Summer	3	3	—	6
1948 Summer	—	5	—	5
1952 Summer	1	—	—	1
1956 Winter	—	1	—	1
1956 Summer	2	—	—	2
1960 Summer	—	1	—	1
1964 Winter	—	1	—	1
1964 Summer	1	—	—	1
1968 Summer	2	3	—	5
1972 Winter	—	2	—	2
1972 Summer	1	2	—	3
1976 Winter	—	4	—	4
1976 Summer	5	3	—	8
1980 Winter	—	3	—	3
1980 Summer	1	1	—	2
1984 Winter	2	3	—	5
1984 Summer	8	4	—	12
1988 Winter	1	6	—	7
1988 Summer	8	9	—	17
1992 Winter	2	2	—	4
1992 Summer	15	10	—	25
1994 Winter	3	1	—	4
1996 Summer	44	14	—	58
1998 Winter	14	—	—	14
2000 Summer	45	25	—	70
2002 Winter	17	3	—	20
2004 Summer	53	16	—	69
2006 Winter	20	7	—	27
2008 Summer	94	13	—	107
2010 Winter	29	7	—	36
2012 Summer	136	17	—	153
2014 Winter	35	7	—	42
2016 Summer	206	37	3	246
2018 Winter	45	9	—	54
2020 Summer (Note: Took place in 2021 due to the COVID-19 pandemic.)	293	29	9	331
2022 Winter	49	14	1	64
2024 Summer	226	29	7	262
2026 Winter	51	13	—	64

By sport
Sport	Number of Olympians by gender (Note: Including multi-disciplinary Olympians)					
Sport	Female		Male		Non-binary	Total
Sport	Cisgender	Transgender	Cisgender	Transgender	Non-binary	Total
Alpine skiing & Para-alpine skiing	5	—	2	—	—	7
Archery	3	—	—	—	—	3
Athletics & Para-athletics	40	2 (Note: One competed in a men's category, the other in a women's category.)	16	2 (Note: Competed in a women's category)	4	64
Badminton	4	—	—	—	—	4
Basketball & Wheelchair basketball	65	—	—	—	1	66
Beach volleyball	8	—	—	—	—	8
Biathlon & Parabiathlon	4	—	1	—	—	5
Bobsleigh	2	—	1	—	—	3
Boxing	13	—	2	1	—	16
Canoeing and Kayaking & Paracanoe	5	1 (Note: Competed in a men's category)	—	—	—	6
Climbing	–	–	1	—	—	1
Cross-country skiing & Para cross-country skiing	6	—	1	—	—	7
Curling & Wheelchair curling	1	—	1	—	—	2
Cycling & Paracycling	26 (Note: Kate O'Brien has competed in both cycling and paracycling. She is only counted once.)	1	1	—	—	28
Diving	—	—	13	—	—	13
Equestrian & Para-equestrian	1	—	23	—	—	24
Fencing & Wheelchair fencing	6	—	1	—	—	7
Figure skating	6	—	36	—	1	43
Football	183	—	3	—	1	187
Freestyle skiing	5	—	2	1	—	8
Goalball	2	—	—	—	—	2
Golf	3	—	—	—	—	3
Gymnastics	9	—	12	—	—	21
Handball	19	—	—	—	—	19
Hockey	32	—	2	—	—	34
Ice hockey	71	—	—	—	—	71
Judo & Para Judo	17	—	1	—	—	18
Luge	—	—	1	—	—	1
Powerlifting	—	—	1	—	—	1
Rowing & Pararowing	28	—	4	—	1	33
Rugby sevens	31	—	—	1	2	34
Sailing	3	—	—	—	—	3
Shooting	5	—	—	—	—	5
Skateboarding	6	—	—	—	2	8
Skeleton	4	—	2	—	—	6
Ski jumping	1	—	1	—	—	2
Snowboarding & Para snowboard	8	—	—	—	—	8
Softball	11	—	—	—	—	11
Speed skating	10	—	2	—	—	12
Surfing	6	—	—	—	—	6
Swimming	16	—	25	—	1	42
Table tennis	1	—	—	1	—	2
Taekwondo & Parataekwondo	2	—	1	—	—	3
Tennis & Wheelchair tennis	22	—	3	—	—	25
Triathlon & Paratriathlon	5	—	2	—	—	7
Volleyball & Sitting volleyball	21	—	3	—	—	24
Water polo	4	—	1	—	—	5
Weightlifting	1	1	—	—	—	2
Wrestling	2	—	—	—	—	2

By art
Art	Number of Olympians by gender					
Art	Female		Male		Non-binary	Total
Art	Cisgender	Transgender	Cisgender	Transgender	Non-binary	Total
Epic Literature	—	—	1	—	—	1
Dance (Note: Demonstration event)	1	—	1	—	—	2
Drawings and water colours (Painting)	—	—	2	—	—	2
Graphic arts	—	—	2	—	—	2
Literature (Open)	—	—	3	—	—	3
Lyric works (Literature)	—	—	2	—	—	2
Painting	1	—	6	—	—	7
Sculpting (Open)	2	—	2	—	—	4
Statue sculpting	5	—	1	—	—	6

== See also ==
- Drag and the Olympic Games
- The Front Runner (novel)
- Homosexuality in modern sports
- Transgender people in sports
