= Drag and the Olympic Games =

There have been multiple instances in which drag has been featured as part of the Olympic Games. The closing ceremony of the 2000 Summer Olympics in Sydney included dozens of drag performers to commemorate The Adventures of Priscilla, Queen of the Desert as part of a tribute to the cinema of Australia. Leading up to the 2024 Summer Olympics in Paris, Nicky Doll and two other drag queens participated in the torch relay, and Nymphia Wind performed at the Cultural Olympiad. Nicky Doll, Paloma, Piche, Kam Hugh, and other drag performers were featured in the opening ceremony.

The inclusion of drag has not been without controversy. The drag performance in 2000 was criticized by some church groups and politicians, and some critics in 2024 considered the scene to be blasphemous, drawing comparisons to Leonardo da Vinci's The Last Supper. In addition to drag-related programming at the Olympic Games, the Drag Race franchise has had Olympics-inspired programming, as well as guest appearances by Olympic athletes.

== History ==
=== 2000 Summer Olympics ===
The closing ceremony of the 2000 Summer Olympics in Sydney featured 46 drag performers commemorating the 1994 film The Adventures of Priscilla, Queen of the Desert, as part of a larger tribute to Australian film. The performers wore costumes from the film, which earned Tim Chappel and Lizzy Gardiner an Academy Award for Best Costume Design, as well as original gowns. The inclusion of drag was criticized by some church groups and far-right politicians.

=== 2024 Summer Olympics ===
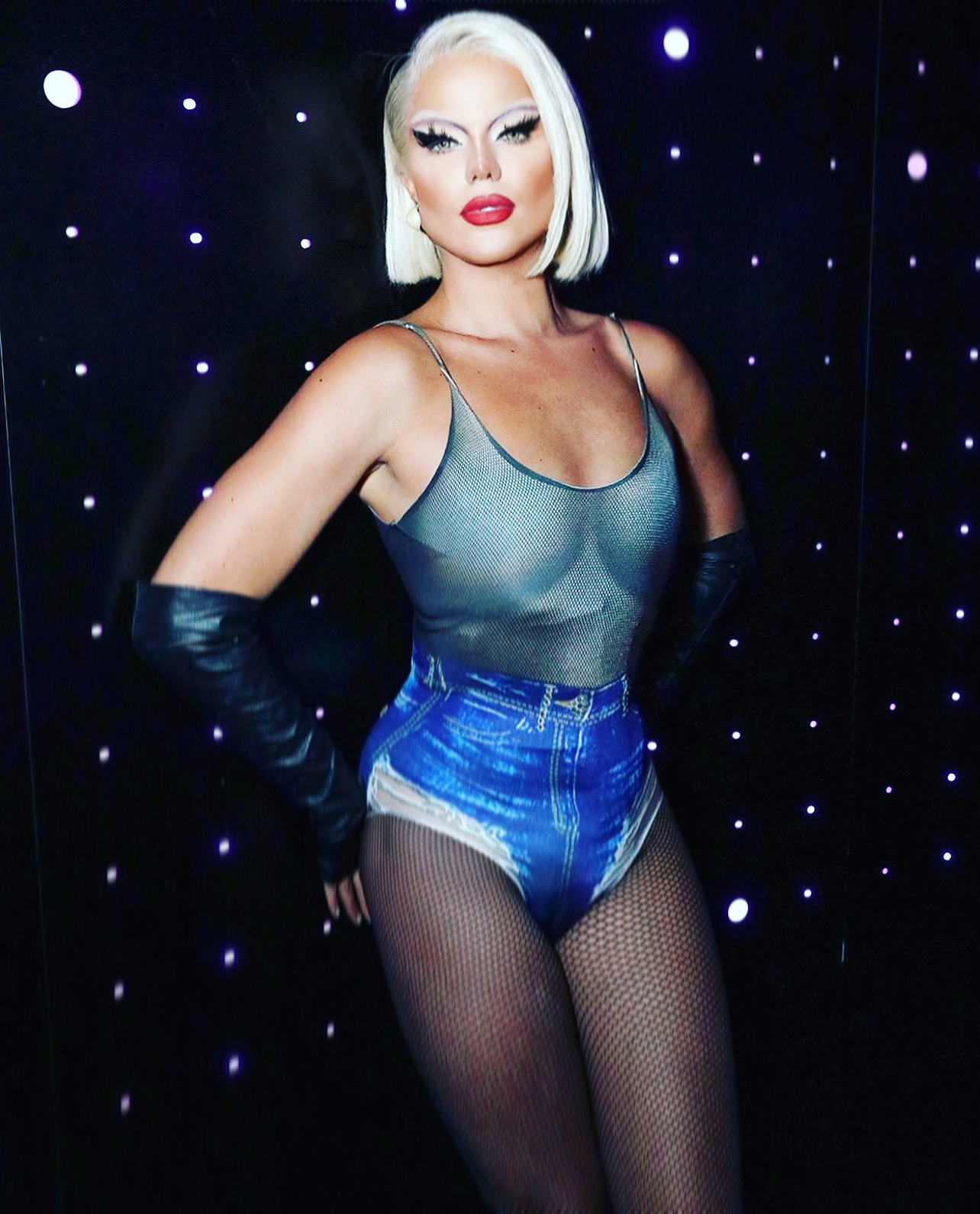
For the 2024 Summer Olympics in Paris, French drag queen Nicky Doll (pictured in 2022) carried the Olympic torch during the relay and appeared in the opening ceremony.

Three drag queens—Nicky Doll, who competed on the twelfth season of the American television series RuPaul's Drag Race and hosts the French spin-off series Drag Race France, as well as Minima Gesté and Miss Martini—carried the Olympic torch during the torch relay for the 2024 Summer Olympics in Paris. This was the first time drag artists participated in the relay. Additionally, Taiwanese-American drag queen Nymphia Wind, who won the sixteenth season of RuPaul's Drag Race, performed at the Cultural Olympiad's Taiwan Pavilion.

The opening ceremony's styling and costumes director was French television presenter Daphné Bürki, who is also a judge on Drag Race France.

==== Opening ceremony ====
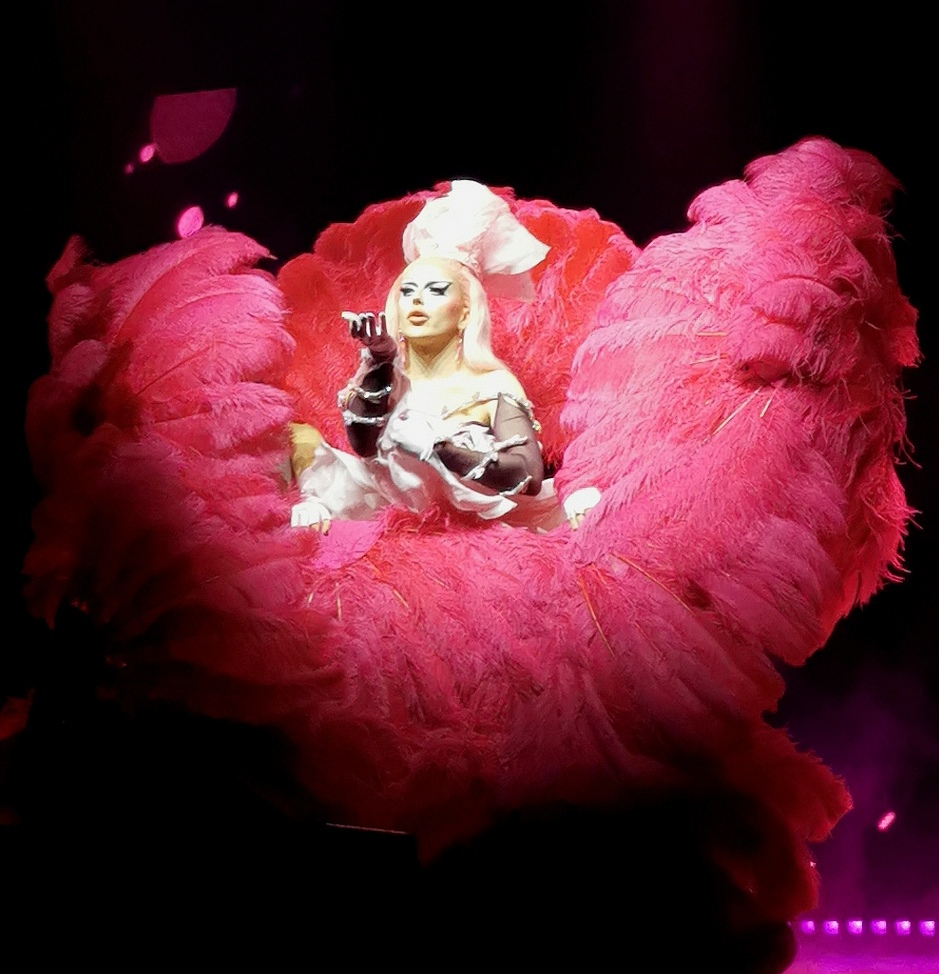
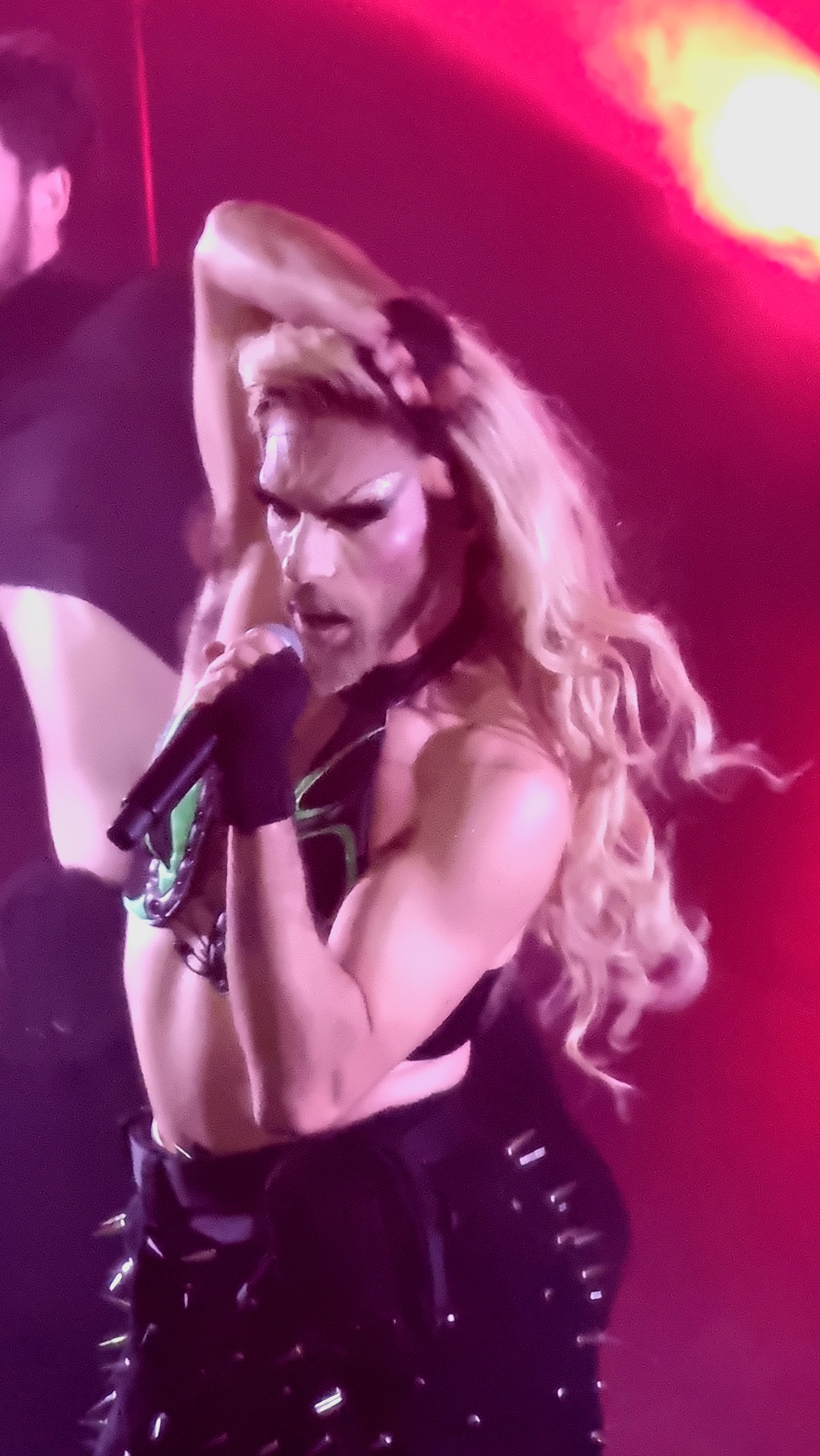
Drag Race France contestants Kam Hugh (left) and Piche (right) participated in the opening ceremony.

The opening ceremony also featured drag queens, including Nicky Doll and Drag Race France contestants Paloma and Piche, who walked a red carpet runway along the Passerelle Debilly. The queens were joined by other models and performers, including disc jockey Barbara Butch, who wore a silver headdress resembling a halo. The performers were "dressed as Greek gods in Louis Vuitton costumes to celebrate the history of French art and fashion", according to Christian Holub of Entertainment Weekly. Another segment in the opening ceremony featured Drag Race France contestant Kam Hugh.

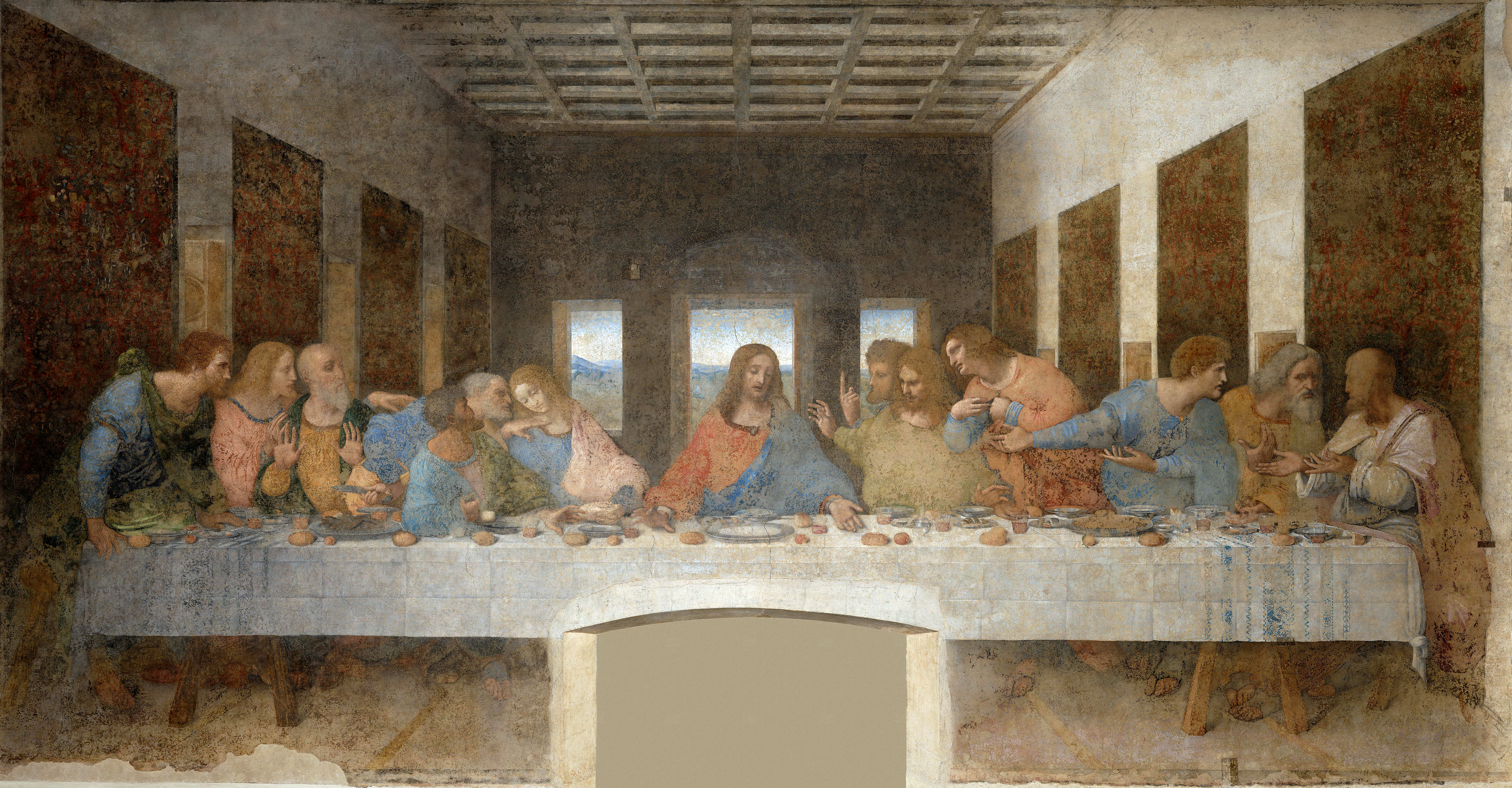
Some critics of the scene with drag queens drew comparisons to Leonardo da Vinci's The Last Supper, which depicts the Last Supper of Jesus with the Twelve Apostles.

The runway scene received criticism and garnered a mixed reaction. The segment was criticised by some Christian groups. The Roman Catholic Bishops' Conference of France considered it a "derision and mockery of Christianity". The Holy See "deplore[d] the offence" caused to Christians. The Russian Orthodox Church criticized the opening ceremony. The ecumenical organisation the World Council of Churches asked for an explanation from the IOC and described Christians as being "angered".Festivité was also criticised by the Islamic organisation Al-Azhar Al-Sharif for depicting Jesus in an "offensive manner". Secular criticism of the segment came primarily from conservative figures, such as Turkish president Recep Tayyip Erdoğan, former US president Donald Trump, and Slovak deputy prime minister Tomáš Taraba, the last of whom described the ceremony as "deviant decadence". French leftist opposition figure Jean-Luc Mélenchon joined the criticism of the sequence.

Contrastingly, the scene received praise from others for "celebrating queer visibility and LGBTQ+ inclusivity", according to American magazine Cosmopolitan. Among those who expressed appreciation for the segment were Bure's former co-star American actress Jodie Sweetin, as well as Le Filip, a Croatian-French drag queen who won the third season of Drag Race France.

In response to the criticism, the Paris 2024 producers stated that director Thomas Jolly "took inspiration from Leonardo da Vinci's famous painting to create the setting", and cited that the painting had already been frequently parodied in popular culture. However, the next day Jolly denied having been inspired by The Last Supper on BFM TV. On 28 July, organisers issued an apology for the performance, stating that "there was never an intention to show disrespect to any religious group". One of the participants in the scene, Barbara Butch, filed a legal complaint after what she described as "an extremely violent campaign of cyber-harassment and defamation" directed toward her after the ceremony. Complaints have also been filed by Jolly, Nicky Doll, the choreographer, the producers, and the organizers. French president Macron condemned the harassment; he also defended the ceremony as a whole, stating that it had "made our compatriots extremely proud."

The Olympic World Library would later debunk the claims about the segment being the Last Supper when it published the media guide of the ceremony (written before the ceremony) as it mentions being homage to cultural festivities and according to Georgian fact checking website, Myth Detector, many experts had pointed out the differences between the fresco and the segment.

== Television programming ==
The Drag Race franchise has had Olympics-inspired programming and guest participation by Olympic athletes. The main challenge of "The Draglympics" (2019), the sixth episode of the eleventh season of RuPaul's Drag Race, was inspired by the games. American figure skaters Mirai Nagasu and Adam Rippon were guest judges on the episode. British-American skier Gus Kenworthy appeared on the season finale of the show's tenth season, as well as an episode of the fourth season of the spin-off series RuPaul's Drag Race All Stars, both of which aired in 2018. English diver Tom Daley was a guest judge on an episode of the second series of RuPaul's Drag Race: UK vs. the World (2024).

== See also ==
- LGBTQ history of the Olympic and Paralympic Games
