= Gay Olympics (disambiguation) =

Gay Olympics most commonly refers to the Gay Games, which were originally named the Gay Olympics.

Gay Olympics may also refer to:

- Eurovision Song Contest, a global song contest with a long history of LGBT+ culture
- Eurogames, an LGBT+ multi-sport event in Europe
- World Outgames, a former LGBT sporting event
- LGBT issues at the Olympic and Paralympic Games
