= Sharli Envieh Takie =

Assyrian politician from Iran

Sharli Envieh Takie شارلی انویه تکیه ܫܪܠܝ ܐܢܒ݂ܝܗ ܬܟܝܐ

Assembly Member for Islamic Consultative Assembly
- Incumbent
- Assumed office 27 June 2020
- Preceded by: Yonathan Betkolia

Personal details
- Born: 1976 (age 49–50) Urmia, West Azerbaijan, Iran
- Profession: Engineer and politician

Sharli Envieh Takie (Syriac: ܫܪܠܝ ܐܢܒ݂ܝܗ ܬܟܝܐ, Persian: شارلی انویه تکیه) is an Assyrian engineer and politician originally from Iran. Originally an engineer, he currently serves as a member of the Islamic Consultative Assembly, representing the Assyrian community in Iran.

== Early life ==
Envieh was born in 1976 in Urmia, West Azerbaijan. He had initially graduated with a Master's in Civil Engineering, and he had also been a part of organizations and initiatives related to the Iranian Assyrian community.

== Political career ==
=== First term ===
Envieh ran in the 2020 Iranian legislative election as an independent candidate, and successfully won the seat representing Assyrian Christians with 1,071 votes.

In the wake of the Mahsa Amini protests, Envieh had gotten into an argument with another MP, Farshid Fathi, over his response to the protests. While Fathi had lambasted him for not playing a bigger role in the protests, Envieh responded with a personal attack against Fathi, as well an effective conformation that he, as well as leaders from the Assyrian Church of the East, were attempting to tell the Assyrian community to back down from protesting. Around 40-50 Assyrian youth were told by church leaders and Envieh to stop or they would be arrested, but the youth had disagreed.

In 2023, Envieh participated in a meeting between Awa III and Ebrahim Raisi, where they discussed the matter of inter-ethnic and religious dialogue as well as supporting the Assyrian community in Iran. He had also participated in meetings with speaker of the Iranian parliament Mohammad Bagher Ghalibaf, as well as Sepuh Sargsyan of the Armenian Diocese of Tehran.

=== Second term ===
Envieh ran for the Assyrian seat during the 2024 Iranian legislative election and won the election. In October of that year, Sharli took part in the 149th Inter-Parliamentary Union Assembly, as part of the Iranian delegation.

As part of a conference dedicated to Iran's minorities, Envieh condemned the Gaza war and the Israel-Hezbollah conflict, stating "The events and genocide that are taking place in Gaza and Lebanon are a historical shame for ethics, law, and humanity, which the Zionist regime is committing in broad daylight by killing of innocent children and women." He also condemned the Festivité performance at the 2024 Summer Olympics opening ceremony alongside Armenian representatives.

== Personal life ==
In 2021, Envieh was confirmed to have contracted COVID-19, having entered a personal quarantine.
