= Kam Hugh =

French drag performer

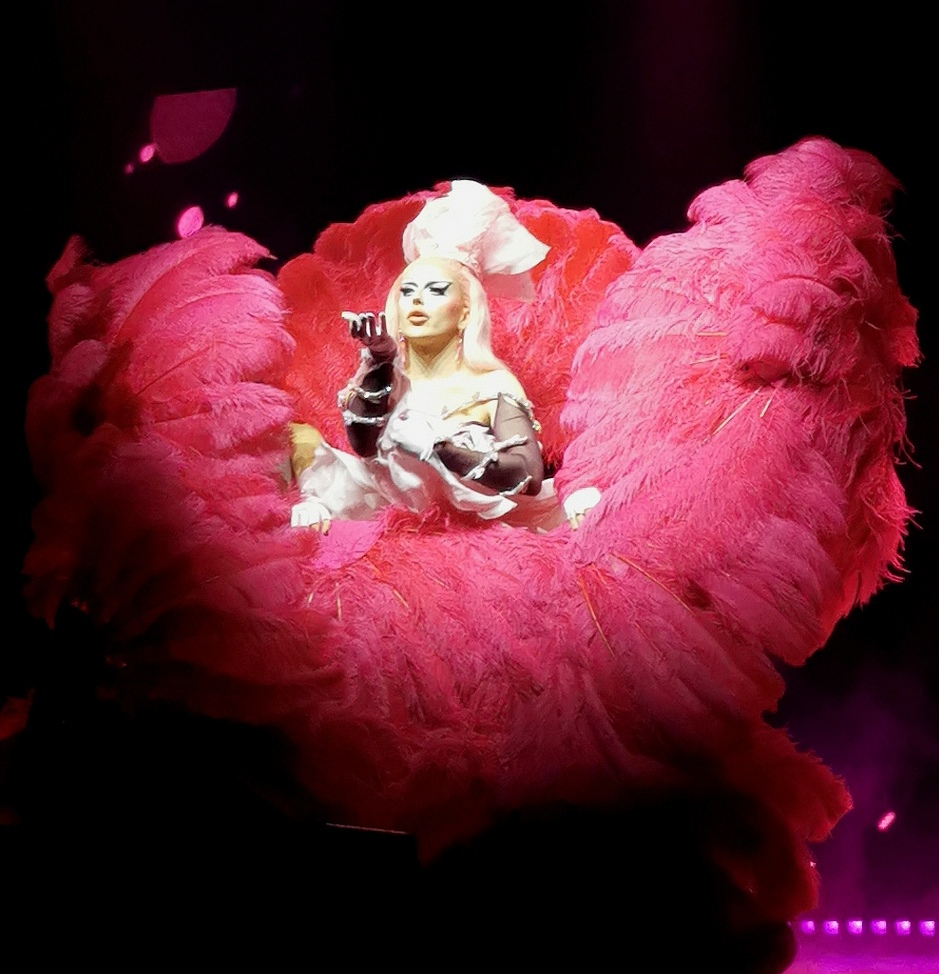
- Kam Hugh performing in 2022
- Born: Camille Chaillan; Aubenas, Ardèche, France

Kam Hugh is the stage name of Camille Chaillan, a French drag performer who competed on season 1 of Drag Race France and season 1 of Drag Race France All Stars.

== Career ==
Kam Hugh competed on season 1 of Drag Race France. He placed seventh overall. He is the first French drag queen to have had his portrait in ELLE France.

== Personal life ==
Originally from Aubenas in Ardèche, Chaillan is based in Paris.

== Filmography ==
- Drag Race France (season 1)
- Drag Race France All Stars (2025)
