= Piche (drag queen) =

French drag performer

- Piche at Paris Pride concert 2026
- Born: Mike Pierre Gautier
- Occupation: Drag queen
- Television: Drag Race France (season 2)

Mike Pierre Gautier (French pronunciation: [majk pjɛʁ ɡotje]), known by the stage name Piche (/piːʃ/, French: [piʃ]), is a French drag performer who competed on the second season of Drag Race France and the first season of Drag Race France All Stars.

== Biography ==
Of Spanish Romani and Algerian origin, Mike Gautier lived in Arles until the mid-2010s, before moving to Paris. His father had expelled him from the family home at the age of 13. He trained in ballet, Jazz dance, Hip-hop and dance in heels, and attended the Conservatoire d'Avignon and the École nationale supérieure de danse de Marseille.

At the Soirée des Étoiles 2019 in Arles, he was awarded the Étoile de la culture in the show category.

== Filmography ==
- Drag Race France
- Bring Back My Girls
- Drag Race France All Stars (2025)
