= Philolaus of Corinth =

Ancient Greek lawmaker

Philolaus of Corinth (Greek: Φιλόλαος ὁ Κορίνθιος) was an ancient Greek lawmaker at Thebes.

Philolaus belonged by birth to the Bacchiadae family of Corinth who arose as Nomothete (lawmaker) at Thebes. He became the lover of Diocles of Corinth, the winner of the stadion race of the 13th Ancient Olympic Games in 728 BCE at Olympia. The stadion race (about 180 meters) was the only competition in the first 13 Olympiads.

When Diocles left Corinth because of his loathing for the incestuous passion of his mother Alcyone and went away to Thebes, he was accompanied by his lover Philolaus. There they lived together for the rest of their lives and were buried in adjoining tombs, facing each other, with Diocles' back to his hated Corinth and Philolaus facing it.

With Philolaus crafting laws for the Thebans, some writers make it clear that these laws gave special support to male unions, contributing to the development of Theban pederasty in which, unlike other places in ancient Greece, it favored the continuity of the union of male couples even after the younger man reached adulthood, the most famous example being the Sacred Band of Thebes, composed of elite soldiers in pairs of male lovers in the 4th century BCE.

The English poet Edward Carpenter published the poem 'Philolaus to Diocles' in his 1883 Towards Democracy, in which the lawgiver tells of his lifelong love for the athlete from his point of view.
