= Diocles of Corinth =

Ancient Greek stadion race Olympic winner

Diocles of Corinth (Greek: Διοκλῆς ὁ Κορίνθιος) was an ancient Greek athlete from Corinth who won the stadion race of the 13th Ancient Olympic Games in 728 BCE at Olympia. The stadion race (about 180 meters) was the only competition in the first 13 Olympiads.

Diocles is said to have been the beloved of Philolaus of the Bacchiadae family of Corinth who arose as Nomothete (lawmaker) at Thebes. Diocles quit Corinth because of his loathing for the incestuous passion of his mother Alcyone and went away to Thebes accompanied by his lover Philolaus. There they lived together for the rest of their lives and were buried in adjoining tombs, facing each other, with Diocles' back to his hated Corinth and Philolaus facing it.

The English poet Edward Carpenter published the poem 'Philolaus to Diocles' in his 1883 Towards Democracy, in which the lawgiver tells of his lifelong love for the athlete from his point of view.
