= Bacchiadae =

Noble Greek family

The Bacchiadae (Ancient Greek: Βακχιάδαι Bakkhiadai), a tightly knit Doric clan, were the ruling family of ancient Corinth in the eighth and seventh centuries BCE, a period of Corinthian cultural power.

== History ==
Corinth had been a backwater in eighth-century Greece. In 747 BCE (a traditional date) an aristocratic revolution ousted the Bacchiad kings of Corinth, when the royal clan of Bacchiadae, numbering perhaps a couple of hundred adult males and claiming descent from the Dorian hero Heracles through the seven sons and three daughters of a legendary king Bacchis, took power from the last king, Telestes. Practising strict endogamy, which kept clan outlines within a distinct extended oikos, they dispensed with kingship and ruled as a group, governing the city by electing annually a prytanis who held the kingly position for his brief term, no doubt a council (though none is specifically documented in the scant literary materials) and a polemarchos to head the army.

In 657 BCE, the Bacchiadae were expelled in turn by the tyrant Cypselus, who had been polemarch. The exiled Bacchiadae fled to Corcyra (a colony of Corinth) and to Magna Graecia, traditionally to found Syracuse in Sicily, and to Etruria, where Strabo reports that Demaratus ruled at Tarquinia. The royal line of the Lynkestis of Macedon was also of Bacchiad descent. The foundation myths of Corcyra, Syracuse, and Megara Hyblaea contain considerable detail about the Bacchiadae and the expeditions of the Bacchiad Archias of Corinth, legendary founder of Syracuse in 734–33 BCE, and Philolaos, lover of Diocles of Corinth, victor at Olympia in 728 BCE and a nomothete (lawgiver) of Thebes.

Some of the Bacchiadae also fled to Sparta, for which they possibly fought against the Messenians during the Second Messenian War.

== List of the Bacchiad kings of Corinth ==
- Aletes 1073 - 1035 BCE
- Ixion 1035 - 997 BCE
- Agelas I 997 - 960 BCE
- Prymnis 960 - 925 BCE
- Bacchis 925 - 890 BCE
- Agelas II 890 - 860 BCE
- Eudemus 860 - 835 BCE
- Aristomedes 835 - 800 BCE
- Agemon 800 - 784 BCE
- Alexander 784 - 759 BCE
- Telestes 759 - 747 BCE

== See also ==
- Aristoi

== Bibliography ==
- Édouard Will, Korinthiaka: recherches sur l'histoire et la civilisation de Corinth des origines aux guerres médiques, Paris, Boccard, 1955.
- Konrad Wickert, Der peloponnesische Bund von seiner Entstehung bis zum Ende des Archidamischen Krieges, Erlangen, 1961.
