= Atkins High School (North Carolina) =

Historic school building in North Carolina, United States

- Atkins High School (former)
- U.S. National Register of Historic Places
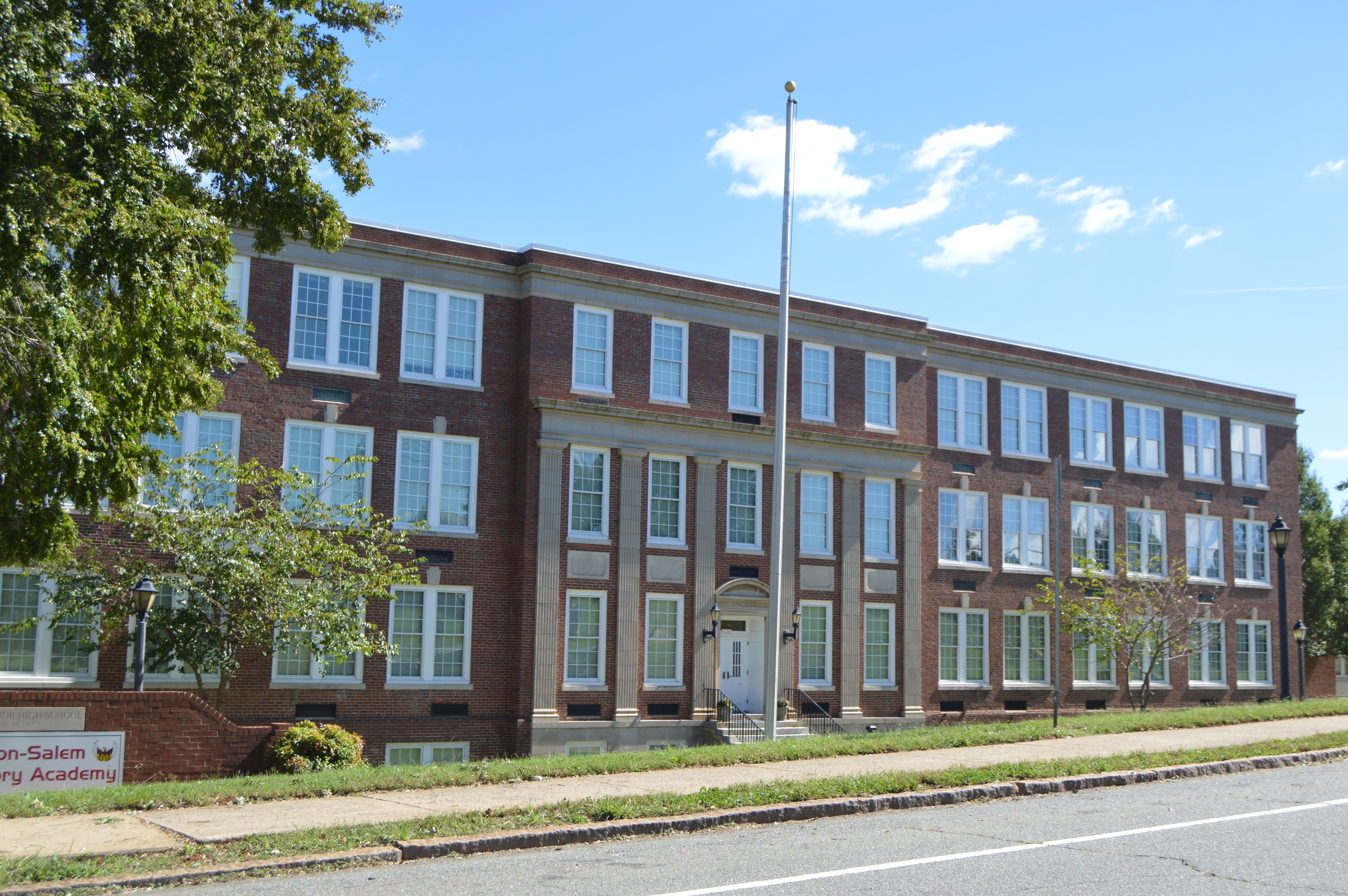
- Facade in October 2018

- Location within North Carolina Location within the United States
- Location: 1215 N. Cameron Ave., Winston-Salem, North Carolina
- Coordinates: 36°06′39″N 80°13′17″W
- Area: 15.1 acres (6.1 ha)
- Built: 1931
- Architect: Macklin, Harold; et al.
- Architectural style: Classical Revival
- NRHP reference No.: 99001618
- Added to NRHP: December 30, 1999

Atkins High School located at Winston-Salem, Forsyth County, North Carolina, was dedicated on April 2, 1931, as a facility for African American students. The building, equipment and grounds were valued at that time at $400,000. This was paid primarily by the city, with a grant of $50,000 from the Rosenwald Fund.

== History ==
Dr. Simon Green Atkins (1863–1934) came to Winston-Salem from Raleigh, North Carolina, where he graduated from St. Augustine Normal and Collegiate Institute (now St. Augustine's College). In 1890, he accepted the position of principal of Depot Street School in Winston-Salem. Dr. Atkins was the organizer, secretary, and agent of the board that started Slater Industrial Academy in 1892, now Winston–Salem State University.

Dr. Atkins served as principal of Slater on a part-time basis for the first two years of its existence, while he continued his work as principal of Depot Street School. As Slater Industrial Academy grew, the demands upon Dr. Atkins' leadership and direction increased. In 1895, he resigned his position at Depot Street School to devote himself entirely to Slater Academy.

Julius Rosenwald was a president of Sears Roebuck who was noted for supporting black schools throughout the south. The first principal was John Carter, who had previously been a professor at Winston-Salem Teacher's College. He continued as principal until 1959. The school curriculum included both an academic track for those students intending to go on to college, and a vocational track for those intending to start work immediately. Atkins served as a high school until 1971, when it then converted into a junior high school.

It was listed on the National Register of Historic Places in 1999.

The Atkins name was transferred to the Simon G. Atkins Academic & Technology High School in September 2005, which opened at a different school building. The site of the former Atkins High School is now the Winston-Salem Preparatory Academy.

== Notable alumni ==
- Hubbard Alexander — college football and NFL coach
- Hannah Atkins — member of the Oklahoma House of Representatives from 1968 to 1980, and the first African-American woman elected to it
- William Bell — served as mayor of Durham, North Carolina
- Carl Eller — NFL defensive end, member of Pro Football Hall of Fame
- Herman Gilliam — NBA player
- Happy Hairston — NBA player
- Ike Hill — NFL defensive back
- Lawrence Joel — United States Army soldier and Medal of Honor recipient
- Willie Porter — professional basketball player
- Togo D. West, Jr. — American attorney and public official
- Nadine Winter — community activist and Democratic politician in Washington, D.C.
- Larry W. Womble — member of the North Carolina General Assembly
