= Second Harvest North Florida =

U.S. nonprofit organization

- Founded: January 1, 1979; 47 years ago
- Founder: Lutheran Social Services Northeast Florida, Inc.
- Type: Social service
- Location(s): 1502 Jessie Street; Jacksonville, Florida
- Coordinates: 30.3333°N 81.6360°W
- Region served: Duval; Clay; St. Johns; Nassau; Baker; Flagler; Alachua; Putnam; Levy; Gilchrist; Dixie; Suwannee; Lafayette; Hamilton; Union; Bradford; Columbia Counties
- Members: 450 nonprofit organizations
- Owner: Lutheran Social Services Northeast Florida, Inc.
- Key people: Bruce Ganger (Executive Director)
- Revenue: $6.46 million (2012)
- Expenses: $5.95 million (2012)
- Employees: 56
- Volunteers: 3,700
- Website: www.wenourishhope.org

Second Harvest North Florida (SHNF) is a 501(c)(3) non-profit organization located in Jacksonville, Florida, that performs food rescue and redistribution to partner agencies in one quarter of Florida's 67 counties. The charitable organization has been active since 1979.

== History ==
The original organization began in 1979 as a food program of Lutheran Social Services Northeast Florida, Inc., and is still controlled by their board of directors. The program expanded to become a food bank two years later, and continued to grow. They joined America's Second Harvest (now Feeding America) in 1984 as a certified member.

In 1996, Congress passed the Bill Emerson Good Samaritan Act, releasing those who donate food or distribute donated food from liability in the event that an individual is affected by the consumption of that food, provided that due diligence is exercised. This act enabled large corporations to donate usable food that they would normally discard, providing food banks with millions of pounds of food. In the last five years, pounds of food distributed has increased from 7.6 million in 2008; 10.3 million in 2009; 19 million in 2010; 20 million in 2011; to 24 million in 2012. Feeding America has projected that by 2015, 40 million pounds will be needed to meet client need.

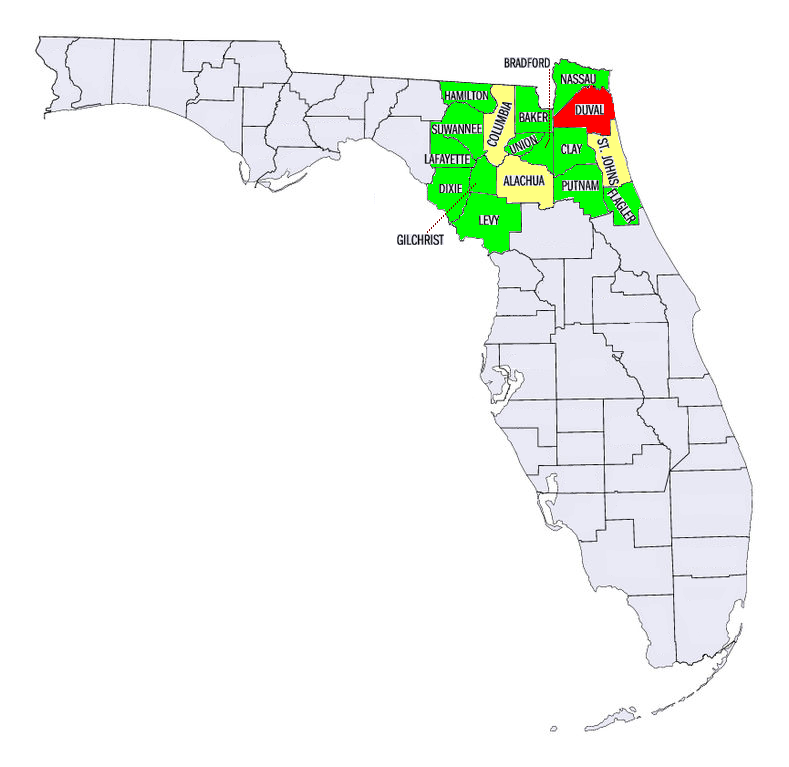
Map of area served by Second Harvest North Florida

== Operations ==
In the area served by Second Harvest North Florida, there are nearly 342,000 people who are food insecure, including one in four children. Food is collected from 200 Jacksonville metropolitan area grocery stores, food warehouses, distributors and sponsored food drives using their fleet of 13 refrigerated and non-refrigerated trucks. Approximately 100,000 pounds of food is received daily at the 33,000 ft^{2} warehouse on Jessie street. Fresh food is re-distributed within 24 hours, and often the same day it is collected.

Second Harvest North Florida distributes nonperishable and perishable food items to more than 450 hunger relief agencies in 17 of Florida's 67 counties. Truckloads of food are sent to facility partnerships in Gainesville, Lake City and St. Augustine for subsequent pickup in the more distant counties. Small Jacksonville agencies pick up their food directly from the Jessie street warehouse, while the largest clients have food delivered. The 450 nonprofit organizations that are served by SHNF include ministries, church pantries, medical clinics and senior citizen centers; after-school and summer programs for children; and homeless or abuse shelters.

The current executive director is Bruce Ganger, hired in September 2011 to replace Thomas Mantz, who resigned six months earlier. There was a nationwide search to fill the $110,000 job, but Ganger, a Jacksonville resident, was chosen based on experience and leadership.

== Food collection ==
Food that retailers will not sell because of its appearance (the can is dented, label damaged) or being out of date is donated. Major providers include food supplier ConAgra and retail companies like BJ's Wholesale Club, Publix Super Markets, Target, Walmart, Winn-Dixie and Save-A-Lot. The value of donated and distributed food in FY 2012 was over $22 million.

=== Jaguars ===
In 1995, their inaugural year, the Jacksonville Jaguars selected SHNF as a favorite charity, and the team has partnered with Winn Dixie to sponsor an October food drive every year since. Fans are encouraged to bring canned food donations to one game, and the food is delivered to Second Harvest. In 2010, the Campbell Soup Company sponsored a contest between all 32 NFL teams to promote their revamped Chunky soups and benefit each city's local food bank. SHNF received 13,000 cans of Chunky soup when the Jaguars were named the AFC winner.

=== Post office ===
The SHNF is also a beneficiary of the Stamp Out Hunger Food Drive held each May since it began nationally in 1993. Members of the National Association of Letter Carriers and National Rural Letter Carriers' Association collect the non-perishable food during their Saturday deliveries. The project collected over 1 billion pounds of food (nationally) in the first 20 years of the event.

=== Scouts ===
The Gateway Council of the Girl Scouts of the USA donated 1,200 cases of Girl Scout Cookies to the SHNF in May, 2013. They were left over after the yearly event sold nearly 1.2 million boxes in north Florida. The Boy Scouts of America have an annual food drive called Scouting for Food that has benefited local food banks.

== Fundraising ==
Since all food is acquired without cost, donations are used to cover the SHNF operational costs, most of which is the cost of distribution. Each dollar donated to SHNF generates seven meals for a person in need. The food bank relies on donations from individuals and corporate foundations, plus three major events each year to raise awareness and generate additional funding.

=== Empty bowls ===
Empty Bowls is an international project to fight hunger; the concept is utilized by organizations on a community level. The Empty Bowls Luncheon in Jacksonville is an annual fundraiser, first held in 1985. It is scheduled in mid-November, prior to Thanksgiving and marks the beginning of the Christmas season. The symbolic bowls are hand-made by school children in art classes, civic groups and seniors at activity centers, so no two bowls are identical. They vary in size, shape, color and quality. Each ticket holder is entitled to select a bowl as a keepsake to remind them of the problem of hunger. Several thousand people typically attend, which is held at the Prime F. Osborn III Convention Center. Those attending will receive a meal of soup and bread served by local celebrities, bid on items in a silent auction, and be entertained by local talent and school groups. Corporate sponsorships are available to help reach the $100,000 goal.

=== Food fight ===
The Jacksonville FOODFIGHT is an annual June event held since 1989 to benefit SHNF. Over 60 first coast restaurants and beverage distributors donate the ingredients and time to prepare and serve their signature foods and beverages to approximately 1,200 guests who each donated at least $60 for an admission ticket. Almost $90,000 was generated in the 23rd edition of the culinary extravaganza, which was staged at the Touchdown Club of EverBank Field. The total raised since 1989 exceeds $1 million.

=== Formal dinner ===

The Taste of the NFL is an annual fundraising event that is sanctioned by the National Football League to fight hunger in the 32 American cities with team franchises. The SHNF is the beneficiary of the gala hosted by the owner of the Jacksonville Jaguars, Shad Khan, and attended by head coach Gus Bradley, and several players. The five or six-course formal dinner, which has sold out every year, is staged at EverBank Field's Upper West Touchdown Club. Seating is limited to 250 persons who each donate $250 to attend. The "party with a purpose" includes a live and silent auction of Jaguar items and has raised over $800,000 for SHNF in seven years.

=== Food trucks ===
A new event was begun in 2012: Jax Truckies Food Truck Championship. The Florida Department of Business and Professional Regulation licenses these mobile kitchens and says they are one of the fastest growing segments of small business. A portion of the funds raised by the competition was donated to Second Harvest North Florida.

== Programs ==
In addition to the year-round process of recovered food sharing, related activities have been initiated to target specialized needs. Thanksgiving baskets are a tradition across the United States. Patrol Officers from the Jacksonville Sheriff's Office volunteered in 2011 to stock 2,500 food baskets and deliver them to needy families.

The number of people seeking food increases during the Summer, so the SHNF held a mass food distribution event on July 24, 2013, at EverBank Field. Executive Director Bruce Ganger commented, "Many of the families we serve have kids who were likely benefiting from free or reduced fee school lunches or a weekend BackPack program during the year, so it's only natural that during the summer, food insecurity is on the rise." To meet the need, Second Harvest provided 150,000 pounds of fresh produce, canned food and frozen meat for 2,500 families in Jacksonville.

=== Kids Cafe ===
Kids Cafe is a national program begun in 1989 to provide after school care and snacks for children in low income neighborhoods. SHNF supports 22 summer lunch sites that utilize food and supplies which are both donated and purchased by the program. SHNF partners with Boys and Girls Clubs, faith-based organizations, and other groups to provide a safe place after school where children can get something nutritious to eat, meet role models and participate in educational and social activities. During the school year, staff and volunteers also assist with homework.

=== Backpack program ===
The BackPack program in north Florida began in 2008 as an extension of the Kids Cafe. During the school year, eligible children receive breakfast and lunch at school. On weekends, holidays and extended breaks, those children may not eat regularly. On Fridays, food is placed in the child's backpack for that child and other family members.

=== Mobile Pantry ===
The Second Harvest Mobile Pantry Program is intended for communities and neighborhoods that are economically challenged, including homebound senior citizens, expectant mothers with other children, working families who cannot make ends meet, and families without transportation. A sponsor must serve as host for the distribution and provide volunteers. The sponsor may be one of SHNF's hunger relief agencies or a group such as a school, civic center or church. A SHNF truck loaded with 8,400 pounds of food is unloaded and will accommodate 237 family groups.

=== SNAP Outreach ===
The Federal Supplemental Nutrition Assistance Program (SNAP) provides an average of $134.29 worth of food for 47.5 million people per month in the United States as of April 2013. It provides low-income households with an Electronic Benefit Transfer card that can be used like cash at most grocery stores. This is the replacement for food stamps that were demonetized in 2008. Second Harvest is also a partner in the Flagler County Mobile Benefits Program, which was formed to help residents gain access to the millions of dollars in SNAP benefits that go unused each year.

=== Community Gardens Initiative ===
This community-based solution is intended to empower food insecure families to grow enough food to supplement their meals. SHNF has partnered with Friends of Northeast Florida Community Gardens to utilize their knowledge and experience. The project has developed a step-by-step template for community-based organizations to use when establishing a community garden. After the organization receives permission to use a vacant lot in an area that is food insecure, 4' x 4' raised garden beds are constructed, and the volunteers are provided with the tools and guidance needed to be successful. Each plot should be able to provide a family of four with a vegetable and salad each day throughout the year.

=== Prenatal care ===
The Health Begins Before Birth program provides at-risk expectant mothers with prenatal vitamins, nutritious meals and guidance during their pregnancies. The program is intended to reduce the area's higher than average infant mortality and premature birth rates. Six local private foundations funded this initiative.

== See also ==
- List of food banks
