= Our Revolution =

American progressive political organization

- Official logo with depiction of "Birdie Sanders"
- Abbreviation: OR
- Predecessor: Bernie Sanders 2016 presidential campaign
- Formation: August 24, 2016
- Type: Political action organization
- Legal status: 501(c)(4)
- Location: Washington, DC
- Chair: Larry Cohen
- Vice-Chair: Megan Green
- Executive Director: Joseph Geevarghese
- Treasurer: Richard Rodriguez
- Board of directors: Larry Cohen, Megan Green, Jane Kleeb, Jim Hightower, Jorden Giger, Richard Rodriguez, Keith Ellison, Joseph Geevarghese, Francisco Fabian, Amanda Nichols, Jonathan Nelson
- Key people: Bernie Sanders, (Note: Our Revolution's 501(c)(4) designation prevents Sanders from playing a role in the organization because he is an elected official.) Jane Sanders, Jeff Weaver, Bill McKibben
- Volunteers: 3,000 (2024 estimate)
- Website: www.ourrevolution.com

Our Revolution (sometimes known by its initials OR) is an American progressive political action organization founded as a continuation of Senator Bernie Sanders's 2016 presidential campaign. The organization's mission is to educate voters about issues, get people involved in the political process, and work to organize and elect progressive candidates. Our Revolution is also the title of a book by Sanders released in November 2016.

== Launch and focus ==
The organization officially launched on August 24, 2016, designated as a 501(c)(4), with a presentation that was live-streamed online via YouTube to meetings across the country and shown by Free Speech TV. Our Revolution's three main goals are to (1) revitalize American democracy by engaging millions of individuals in the political processes, (2) empower the next generation of progressive leaders, and (3) elevate political consciousness by educating the public about issues confronting the United States.

More specifically, the organization aims to create, support, promote and elect progressive candidates from school board to US Senate; support and help pass progressive ballot measures; create, train and mobilize activists; and both support and participate in protests against issues such as the Trans-Pacific Partnership and Dakota Access Pipeline. The progressive issues Our Revolution promotes are almost identical to those of Sanders's 2016 presidential campaign: reducing income and wealth inequality, working for single-payer healthcare, reducing the price of prescription drugs, instituting a $15 (~$20.00 in 2025) minimum wage, expanding Social Security, creating jobs, and making public colleges and universities tuition-free. The organization supports minority rights, specifically African American, Latino and Native American rights, including government respect of treaties with Native Americans. Organizations that support Our Revolution include People for Bernie, National Nurses United, and the Communications Workers of America, among others.

=== Staffing ===
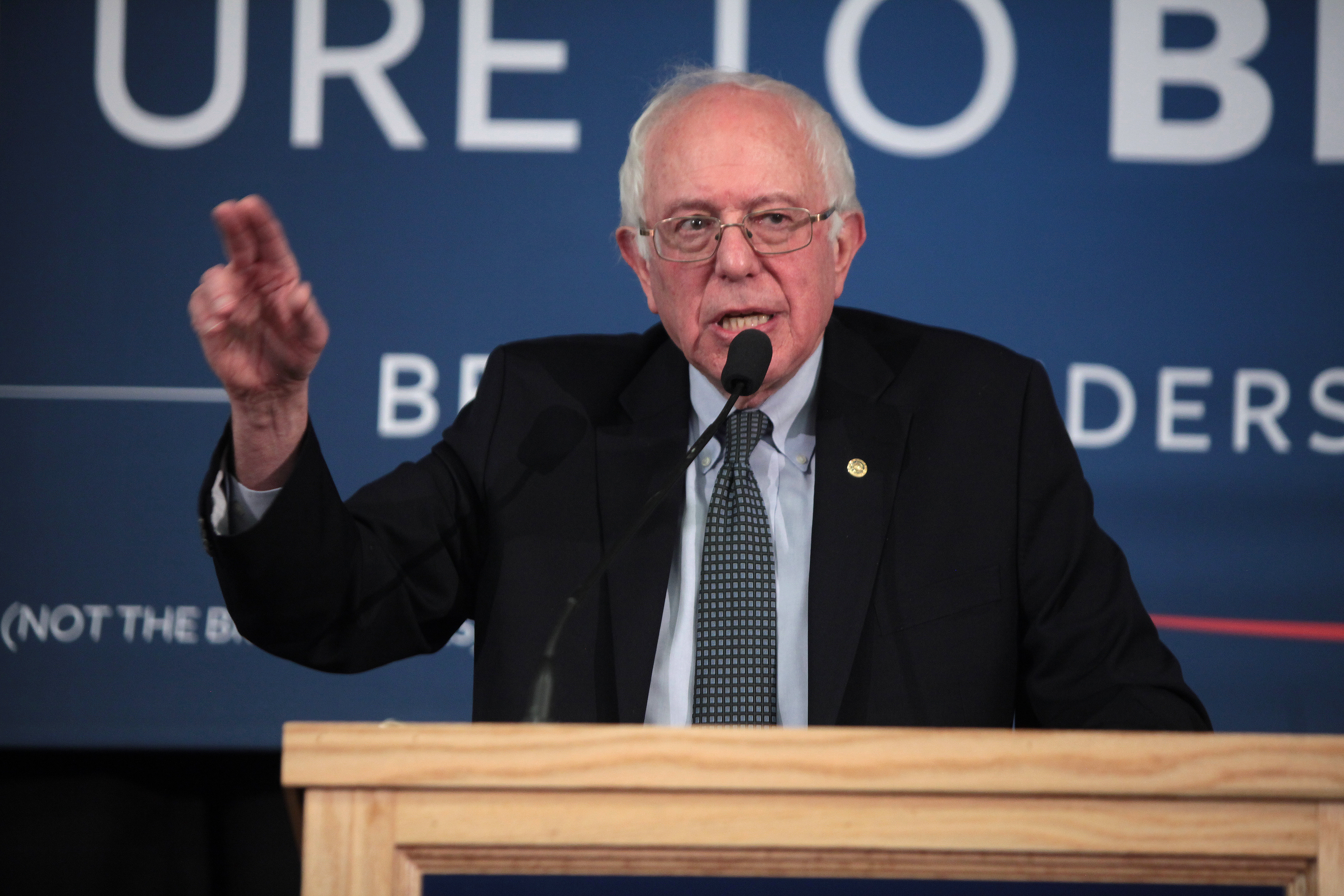
Bernie Sanders speaking at a campaign rally at Southern New Hampshire University in January 2016

Our Revolution was initially led by chairman Larry Cohen and president Nina Turner, both of whom were national co-chairs of Bernie Sanders's 2016 presidential campaign. Our Revolution's 501(c)(4) designation prevents Sanders from playing a role in the organization as an elected official. As of 2019, Turner had left her role as president of the organization. She was not replaced.

At the start, the organization faced a significant staffing challenge as eight of its initial 15 staffers left before the launch when Weaver was chosen as president. They objected to the way he had handled Sanders's presidential campaign and to his decision to make Our Revolution a 501(c)(4). Some staffers also left in protest of a lack of diversity among the organization's leaders. The remaining staff was subsequently joined by an additional three staffers, bringing the total to ten. As of 2024, Our Revolution employed six staffers.

Joseph Geevarghese has served as Our Revolution's executive director since 2019. As of 2024, Larry Cohen serves as chair, Megan Green as vice chair, and Richard Rodriguez as treasurer.

=== 2016 election ===
During the 2016 election, the organization supported several ballot measures and candidates, with $1.3 million (~$1.66 million in 2024) raised. Of the 106 candidates and 34 ballot initiatives Our Revolution supported, 58 candidates and 23 ballot initiatives won in 2016. Our Revolution, like Sanders, opposed the presidential candidacy of Donald Trump. After Trump's election, Our Revolution issued the following statement:

We will do everything in our power to ensure that the president-elect cannot ignore the battles Americans are facing every single day. Our job is to offer a real alternative vision and engage on the local and national level to continue the work of the political revolution in the face of a divided nation.

Sanders himself announced, "I intend to work with President Trump on those issues where he will, in fact, work for the middle class and working families of this country. I will vigorously oppose him if he appeals to racism or sexism or some of the other discriminatory measures that he brought up during his campaign."

Chairman Larry Cohen cited populist sentiment and cautioned that political and economic elitists may face backlash in upcoming elections.

=== Post-2016 political activism ===
In January 2017, Our Revolution activists worked in local elections in California to advance Sanders's agenda. According to executive director Shannon Jackson, Our Revolution is "going to continue to do this around the states".

A May 2018 article in Politico described Our Revolution as "flailing" and "in disarray". According to the article, by May 2018 the organization's monthly fundraising totals were one-third of what they were in May 2017. Moreover, the article noted internal conflicts and tensions within the organization, such as that board members and Sanders 2016 presidential delegates questioned Our Revolution president Nina Turner's actions and motives. Specifically, they questioned whether Turner was using the organization as a springboard for a presidential run of her own and whether she was "settl[ing] scores with the Democratic National Committee from 2016". Turner attempted to hire Tezlyn Figaro—who frequently appeared on Fox News to praise Trump and has made anti-immigration comments—as the chief of staff, but was overruled by the board's executive committee. Additionally, Lucy Flores resigned from the board in April 2018 due to what she claims was the organization's lack of outreach to the Latino community. Our Revolution also endorsed Dennis Kucinich for governor in Ohio in 2018, which some Ohio Democrats questioned because of Turner's close relationship with Kucinich's running mate, even though he was widely considered the most progressive candidate in that race.

A subsequent article in The New Republic concurred with the Politico report and suggested that change may be necessary at Our Revolution for it to succeed at its goals. After Politico reported the discontent with Figaro's position in the organization, Turner announced that Figaro would still be part of the organization and noted that Figaro's anti-immigrant and pro-Trump commentary was not endorsed by Turner or Our Revolution. Figaro said that she "offer[s] no excuse" for her comments and questioned the motivations of those who spoke to Politico about her. Erika Andiola, an undocumented immigrant who was a former political director at Our Revolution, said that Turner fired her after her activism in favor of the DREAM Act.

The Young Turks, a progressive American news and commentary program on YouTube, discussed the Politico article on their May 21 show, calling it an "attack piece". Cenk Uygur strongly objected to its claims and denied its accuracy, including its assertions that the group "has left many Sanders supporters disillusioned" and that the group has "fueled doubts about Sanders' organizational ability heading into 2020".

Our Revolution board member James Zogby disputed the Politico report in a series of tweets, calling it a "hit piece fueled [by] a few disgruntled souls out to harm [Nina Turner]." The Politico article has also been criticized by others on similar grounds, as well as for its anonymous sourcing and lack of quotes. An article published by Common Dreams also broadly disputed the Politico article, as did a Naked Capitalism piece.

In 2024, Our Revolution joined the Democratic Socialists of America in supporting the Uncommitted National Movement, encouraging an uncommitted vote in the 2024 Democratic Party presidential primaries in response to Joe Biden's role in the Gaza genocide.

== Israel/Palestine advocacy ==
Our Revolution is critical of U.S. Israel policy on the grounds that "Israel's genocidal attacks against the civilian population of Gaza have killed over 40,000 Palestinians" and that "of the over 40,000 Gazans who have been killed, two-thirds are women and children". Its fundraising site reads, "No more U.S. funding for Netanyahu's brutal war."
