= William H. Young =

William H. Young may refer to:

- William H. Young (labor leader) (born 1946), American labor leader
- William H. Young (died 1899), founder of Young's Scouts
- William Henry Young (1863–1942), British mathematician
- William Henry Young (politician) (1845–?), American politician
- William Hugh Young (1838–1901), Confederate general

== See also ==
- William Young (disambiguation)
