= Eliza Atkins Gleason =

African American librarian

- Born: Eliza Valeria Atkins; December 15, 1909; Winston-Salem, North Carolina, U.S.
- Died: December 15, 2009 (aged 100)
- Education: Fisk University (B.A); University of Illinois (B.A.S); University of California Berkeley (M.A); University of Chicago (Ph.D)
- Occupations: Librarian and Professor
- Spouse: Dr. Maurice Francis Gleason
- Children: Joy Carew
- Parent(s): Simon Green Atkins; Oliona Pegram Atkins
- Relatives: Jasper Alston Atkins (brother)

Eliza Atkins Gleason (born Eliza Valeria Atkins; December 15, 1909 – December 15, 2009) was the first African American to receive a doctorate in Library Science at the University of Chicago Graduate Library School in 1940. In 1941, she established and became the first Dean of the School of Library Service at Atlanta University and created a library education program that trained 90 percent of all African-American librarians by 1986.

== Education ==
Gleason was born in Winston-Salem, North Carolina, to Simon Green Atkins and Oliona Pegram Atkins. Both of her parents were educators; her mother was a teacher and her father was the founder and first president of Slater State College, now Winston-Salem State University.

After receiving her bachelor's degree from the University of Illinois in 1931, she took her first library job in Louisville, Kentucky, at Louisville Municipal College (originally known as Louisville Municipal College for Negroes) where she soon became the head librarian, following in the footsteps of her sister, Olie Atkins Carpenter, who was a librarian at this institution, as well.

In 1936, Gleason received her master's from the University of California, Berkeley and moved to Chicago where she received her Ph.D. in 1940 from the University of Chicago. Her dissertation, The Southern Negro and the Public Library: A Study of the Government and Administration of Public Library Service to Negroes in the South, was published in 1941 and was the first complete history of library access in the South, with a focus on African-American libraries. Her adviser was Carleton B. Joeckel.

== Career ==
She then took a position as the director of libraries at Talladega College in Alabama. In 1941 she established and became the first Dean of the School of Library Service at Atlanta University.

Gleason left Atlanta in 1946 to join her husband – Dr. Maurice Francis Gleason – in Illinois, where he was setting up a medical practice after having served in the military. The Gleasons married in 1937 and had a daughter, Joy Gleason Carew, who is now a professor of Pan-African studies at the University of Louisville. After stints at Woodrow Wilson Junior College and Chicago Teachers College, as well as a term as a guest lecture at the University of Chicago, Gleason became an associate professor in library science at the South Chicago branch of the Illinois Teachers College in 1964.

Gleason was the first African American to serve on the board of the American Library Association from 1942 to 1946. In 1978, she was appointed to the Chicago Public Library board and became the executive director of the Chicago Black United Fund.

Atkins was active in numerous professional and civic organizations. She was a member of the Women's Auxiliary of the Cook County Physicians Association and the Women's Auxiliary of the Meharry Medical College Alumni Association beginning in 1940. She also participated in the Hyde Park-Kenwood Community Conference (1950) and the Southeast Chicago Commission (1952), and was involved with the Independent Voters of Illinois starting in 1952. In 1961, she joined the Women's Auxiliary of the International College of Surgeons. From 1963 to 1965, she served as co-chair of the Fisk University Centennial Campaign and was a member of the executive committee of the Fisk University Alumni Association in 1964. Atkins was also affiliated with Phi Beta Kappa, Beta Phi Mu (the national honor society for library science), and the American Library Association.

== Death and legacy ==
Gleason died on December 15, 2009 — her 100th birthday. In 2010, she was posthumously inducted into the University of Louisville's College of Arts and Sciences Hall of Honor.

The American Library Association awards the triennial Eliza Atkins Gleason Book Award in her honor for the best book written in English in the field of library history, including the history of libraries, librarianship, and book culture.

Past recipients include: Dr. Cheryl Knott, Christine Pawley, David Allan, Carl Ostrowski, and Louise Robbins.
