= Vincent R. Sombrotto Park =

Park in Washington, D.C., U.S.

- Location within Central Washington, D.C.
- Location: Washington, D.C.
- Coordinates: 38°53′36″N 77°00′43″W

Vincent R. Sombrotto Park is on National Park Service property (Reservation No. 727) in northwest Washington, D.C., bordered by Louisiana Avenue, 1st Street and C Street in the Swampoodle neighborhood.

It is across from the National Association of Letter Carriers (NALC) and is named for Vincent Sombrotto, NALC president from 1979 to 2002.
