= Lulu Belle Madison White =

American civil rights activist (1900–1957)

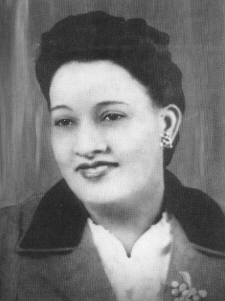
- Photo of Lulu Belle Madison White
- Born: August 31, 1900; Elmo, Texas, U.S.
- Died: July 6, 1957 (aged 56); Houston, Texas, U.S.
- Education: Prairie View A&M University
- Occupation: Civil Rights Activist

Lulu Belle Madison White (August 31, 1900 – July 6, 1957) was a teacher and civil rights activist in Texas during the 1940's and 1950's. In 1939, White was named as the president of the Houston chapter of the National Association for the Advancement of Colored People (NAACP) before becoming executive secretary of the branch in 1943. Under her leadership, the Houston chapter of the NAACP more than doubled in size from 1943 to 1948.

== Early life ==
White was born in Elmo, Texas in 1900 to Henry Madison and Easter Madison. Her father had been born enslaved in 1857 in Mississippi, where at the age of twenty he married Easter Norwood. Lulu was the eleventh of their twelve children, seven of whom were born in Hattiesburg, Mississippi, before Henry and Easter Madison moved the family to Elmo after 1891.

Elmo was a predominately black community thirty-five miles north of Dallas. The region was noted for its especially racist customs, and this helped incite White to become a civil rights activist. Her father encouraged White to receive an education.

== Career ==
In 1923, White enrolled at Butler College in Tyler, Texas, for a year before transferring to Prairie View College (now Prairie View A&M University) in Hempstead, Texas. Here, she received a bachelor's degree in English in 1928. Following graduation, White married Julius White, a Houston businessman and NAACP member who had been involved in voting rights cases. Because White was unable to find a job in Houston due to her husband's connection with the Civil Rights Movement, she took a teaching position in Lufkin, Texas, where she taught English and physical education. After nine years of teaching, White resigned to become a full-time activist with the NAACP. White soon became the first woman to be a full-time salaried executive secretary of a local chapter of the NAACP.

In her role as executive secretary, White led the Houston NAACP chapter through pivotal legal challenges to the White primary and to school segregation in the United States. Notably, White helped to recruit Heman Marion Sweatt as the plaintiff in a test case to challenge segregation at the University of Texas School of Law. Sweatt eventually won the landmark case, Sweatt v. Painter, in 1950.

In 1949, White stepped down from her role as executive secretary of the Houston branch after disagreements with Carter Wesley over the issue of racial integration. However, she remained the Director of State Branches. White led the movement for the Houston City Council to pass an ordinance that would allow city hospitals to employ black doctors, helped organize protests for African-American women to be able to try on clothes in department stores, and worked to integrate taxi companies. She went on to be a field worker for the national branch of the NAACP, and later the national branch of the NAACP would create a Lulu White Freedom Fund in her honor. She remained politically active until her death from a heart ailment on July 6, 1957.

== Voting Rights and Economic Equality ==
White took many initiatives to help African Americans gain the right to vote. She played a role in the elimination of the White primaries in 1943, which stated that only whites were able to vote in Democratic Party party primaries.

White thought that it was essential for African-Americans to have equal civil liberties and equal economic opportunities. In promoting this idea, she encouraged African Americans to seek employment opportunities at businesses that were traditionally regarded as white establishments. While White herself adopted this notion of equal employment opportunity, she was frequently turned away by managers who refused to see her. To highlight the inequality of employment opportunities among whites and African-Americans, she organized group demonstrations condemning managers for this behavior. As a consequence, White was sometimes labeled a communist.

== Legacy ==
White remained active as an activist in the black community until her death on July 6, 1957. It is suspected that she died of heart disease and is currently buried in Paradise South in Houston, Texas. In the week before her death, the NAACP created the Lulu White Freedom Fund in her honor.
