= Jasper Alston Atkins =

American lawyer

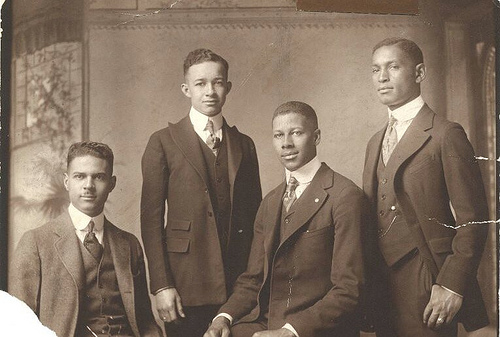
(left to right): Jasper Alston Atkins, Charles A. Chandler, Mifflin Gibbs, and Leroy Pierce.

Jasper Alston Atkins (August 8, 1898 – June 28, 1982) was an attorney, activist, and educator.

== Early life ==
Jasper Alston Atkins was born August 8, 1898, in Winston-Salem, North Carolina to Dr. Simon Green Atkins and Mrs. Oleona Pegram Atkins. Prior to Jasper's birth, his parents founded the Slater Industrial Academy on September 28, 1892. Jasper would attend this school, and upon his graduation in 1915 the name was changed to Slater State Normal School. The institution became Winston-Salem State Teacher's College in 1925 and Winston-Salem State University in 1969.

Atkins's grandparents were slaves.

== College ==
In September 1915, Atkins matriculated to Fisk University in Nashville, Tennessee. As a freshman, he won the first prize in oratory, earning a similar success at graduation. While at Fisk, Atkins competed on the debate team and was initiated into the Omega Psi Phi fraternity through the Camp Howard chapter in 1918. He graduated magna cum laude from Fisk in 1919.

== Law school ==
Upon graduation, Atkins received a scholarship to attend Yale Law School in New Haven, Connecticut. In 1920 he served as editor to the esteemed Yale Law Journal, the first time a black person had ever done so. Further, Atkins was charged with the task of creating a scientific index for the thirty one volumes of legal periodicals in the Yale Law Library. As he graduated Yale Law School cum laude with his LL.B. in June 1922, Atkins was elected to the Order of the Coif honor society, the first black to ever earn such a distinction.

== Omega Psi Phi ==
Atkins was instrumental in the founding of Delta chapter of Omega Psi Phi in 1919, which had its origins at Fisk but amidst university dissent was forced to relocate to Meharry Medical College just down the street. He was a charter member of Chi Chapter at Yale University in 1920, along with several other Yale Law students and members of the New Haven community, and served as the Chapter's first Basileus (president).

At the 10th Grand Conclave in Atlanta, Atkins was elected Grand Basileus (national president) in December 1921. He maintained these duties while a student in law school, serving in office until 1924. Under his tenure as Grand Basileus, Atkins reorganized the Fraternity in a number of significant ways. First, he created the office of Vice Grand Basileus, whose responsibility it was to oversee the expansion of Omega. Next, he amended the role of the Grand Keeper of Records (national Secretary) to Grand Keeper of Records and Seals, which turned the focus of the office from mere record keeper to active record shaper, and added the position of Grand Keeper of Finance. Atkins also established five geographic regions, or districts, to better attend to the needs of various colleges and communities within Omega, which by that time (1922) spanned New England down to the Southeastern States, the Midwest out to the far West. Lastly, Atkins commissioned the ritual to be composed at Chi Chapter in New Haven, but its chief composer, a Yale Law School student by the name of Warren Westmoreland Purdy (initiated at Beta Chapter), died suddenly on June 9, 1922 during its composition. The ritual would then be completed at the next Grand Conclave, held in Philadelphia.

== Legal career ==
Following his graduation of Yale Law School in 1922, Atkins moved to Muskogee, Oklahoma to open a law firm with Carter Walker Wesley, a Northwestern Law School graduate and fellow Fraternity brother who was initiated at the Fraternity's Ft. Des Moines chapter. The firm, initially named Saddler, Atkins, & Wesley, operated offices in Muskogee and Tulsa. By 1927, Atkins and Wesley relocated the firm to Houston, Texas, a short time after which the two were joined by James Nabrit Jr. to form the firm of Nabrit, Atkins, & Wesley. Also in 1927, Atkins was admitted to practice law before the U.S. Supreme Court. In 1935, he argued the case of Grovey v. Townsend, a landmark civil rights case in which Grovey was denied an absentee ballot for voting in a Texas primary election. The case resulted in defeat, but it was overruled a nearly a decade later by the Court's decision in Smith v. Allwright. Atkins briefly served as editor of the Informer and Texas Freeman in Houston before returning to his home state of North Carolina.

Atkins was made Executive Secretary of Winston-Salem Teacher's College, the school his parents had founded in the late 19th century and where his brother served as President. Atkins spent the remainder of his legal and educational career in the state, advocating for equality of black citizens in public schools and public accommodations.

== Death ==
On June 28, 1982 at the age of 83 years, Jasper Alston Atkins died in Winston-Salem, North Carolina.

== Additional Material ==
- Guide to the Jasper Alston Atkins papers at Yale University
