= Drew Von Bergen =

American journalist and press secretary

- Born: Louis Andrew Von Bergen; January 24, 1940; Scranton, Pennsylvania
- Died: December 18, 2017 (aged 77)
- Education: University of Scranton
- Occupations: Journalist public relations

Louis Andrew "Drew" Von Bergen (January 24, 1940 – December 18, 2017) was an American journalist and press secretary, based in Washington, D.C. Von Bergen was a national labor reporter for United Press International (UPI) from 1963 until 1985. Additionally, he became President of the National Press Club in 1980 and later served as the press secretary for former Ohio U.S. Senator Howard Metzenbaum.

== Biography ==
Drew Von Bergen was born in Scranton, Pennsylvania, on January 24, 1940, to Beulah Greene Von Bergen and John D. Von Bergen. His grandfather, John Von Bergen, served as the Mayor of Scranton from 1909 until 1914. His father, John Von Bergen, was a Scranton-based radio and television broadcaster.

Von Bergen received his bachelor's degrees in secondary education, history and political science from the University of Scranton in 1961. Von Bergen simultaneously began his journalism career while still attending still college. He was hired as a correspondent for the former Scrantonian-Tribune, covering nearby West Scranton and Dunmore, from 1959 until 1961. Von Bergen enlisted in the United States Army from 1961 until 1963 following his graduation from the University of Scranton. He was stationed at Fort Irwin National Training Center in California, where he served as the editor of the training station's newspaper.

=== Career ===
Von Bergen reported for United Press International (UPI) from 1963 to 1985. He began his career at UPI as a reporter, based in Newark, New Jersey, in 1963 before transferring to UPI's office in Frankfort, Kentucky, where he served as its bureau chief. In 1970, Von Bergen moved to UPI's bureau in Washington D.C., where he covered the U.S. Congress and politics, focusing on coal-producing states, such as Kentucky and West Virginia. He would later become UPI's national reporter for labor and labor relations, as well as the news agency's night editor.

Von Bergen was national officer of the Wire Service Guild, a union which represents employees of the news wire services, including UPI. He chaired the Wire Service Guild's negotiating team which authorized the first employee strike in United Press International's history in 1974. The strike, led by Von Bergen, last 23 days and resulted in a new, two-year contract which guaranteed pay increase of nearly six percent annually.

In 1980, Von Bergen became the President of National Press Club, a major professional organization for journalists headquartered in Washington D.C., which had 4,700 members at the time.

From 1985 until 1987, he served as the press secretary for former Sen. Howard Metzenbaum (D-Ohio).

He then became the director of public relations for the National Association of Letter Carriers (NALC) from 1987 until his retirement in 2010. During his tenure, Von Bergen helped to establish the NALC's annual Stamp Out Hunger Food Drive in 1991. The yearly food drive, which takes place on the second Saturday of May, takes place in more than 10,000 cities and towns throughout the United States. U.S. mail carriers pick up the donations for this food drive each year.

Additionally, Von Bergen also served as the National Cherry Blossom Festival from 1995 until 1997. In 1995, he led a delegation of Cherry Blossom Festival board members and participants on a friendship trip to Japan.

Drew Von Bergen died from complications of congestive heart failure on December 18, 2017, at the age of 77. A resident of Alexandria, Virginia, Von Bergen was buried in Forest Hill Cemetery in Dunmore, Pennsylvania.
