= Heman Marion Sweatt =

American civil rights activist (1912–1982)

Heman M. Sweatt
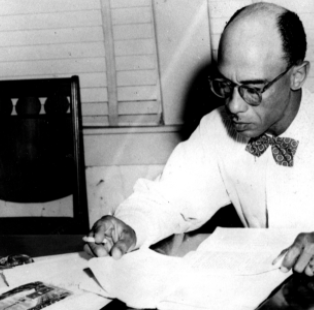
- Born: Heman Marion Sweatt; December 11, 1912; Houston, Texas, U.S.
- Died: October 3, 1982 (aged 69); Atlanta, Georgia, U.S.
- Education: Wiley College
- Occupation: African American Civil Rights Activist

Heman Marion Sweatt (December 11, 1912 – October 3, 1982) was an African-American civil rights activist who confronted Jim Crow laws. He is best known for the Sweatt v. Painter lawsuit, which challenged the "separate but equal" doctrine and was one of the earliest of the events that led to the desegregation of American higher education.

== Early life ==
Heman Marion Sweatt (nicknamed "Bill") was born on December 11, 1912, in Houston, Texas, the fourth of six children born to James Leonard Sweatt and Ella Rose Perry. His father James Sweatt had attended Prairie View Normal and Industrial College and became a school teacher and principal in Beaumont before moving to Houston for better economic opportunity.

Heman grew up in a relatively desegregated area of Houston, the third ward on Chenevert Street. Even though his home area was relatively integrated, he still experienced racism and Jim Crow in full. In October 1920 the KKK opened its Houston chapter.

His father passed his love of education on to Heman and his siblings. "At home, our father always stressed the value of an education, he instilled in us an idea of integration at an early age," recalled one of James Sweatt's sons. All of them would go on to attend and graduate from college. Only Heman would attend school in Texas.

In April 1940 he married his high school sweetheart, Constantine Mitchell, and purchased a home.

Like his father before him, Heman's first interaction with the law was because of his concern with the practices within the postal workers union. “Concerned with discrimination against blacks in the post office, where a worker had to be a clerk before promotion to a supervisory position and where blacks were systematically excluded from such positions, Sweatt challenged these practices in his capacity as local secretary of the National Alliance of Postal Employees. “

Heman Sweatt was also a member of Houston's Baháʼí Faith community.

During the early 1940s, he participated in voter-registration drives and raised funds for lawsuits against the white primary. Sweatt had an opportunity to write several columns for the Houston Informer, thanks to Sweatt's father's friend, black Dallas publisher Carter W. Wesley. Post offices stopped promoting blacks to supervisory positions by systematically excluding them from clerical positions which would make them eligible to be promoted. Being a local secretary of the National Alliance of Postal Employees, Sweatt was concerned with discrimination and challenged these practices. While preparing documentation for this case with an attorney, he became more interested in the law. A few years later, in the mid-1940s, Sweatt decided to attend law school and asked William J. Durham to help him. Since Durham knew Texas didn't have law schools for blacks, he advised Sweatt to apply to the University of Texas School of Law. Sweatt not only sought admission but, responding to an appeal Lulu B. White made to a group of Houston blacks for a volunteer to file a lawsuit, also agreed to serve as the NAACP's plaintiff if he was rejected on the basis of race.

== Education ==
He entered Wiley College in Marshall, Texas in 1930, and graduated in 1934 with a Bachelor of Arts degree. Heman was regarded as one of the most brilliant students at Wiley College. While there he was mentored by professor Melvin B. Tolson, who encouraged students to challenge racial discrimination. In 1936 he became a teacher and substitute principal in Cleburne, Texas. In 1937 he attended the University of Michigan in order to become a physician. He enrolled in a number of challenging graduate courses including bacteriology, immunology, and preventive medicine; by the end of his first academic year he had completed twelve semester hours with a B+ average. In the summer of 1938 Heman became a postal carrier and decided not to return to the University of Michigan due to the severe winters and remained in Texas being a postal carrier.

== Sweatt v. Painter ==
Heman Marion Sweatt formally applied to the University of Texas School of Law. The president, Theophilus Painter, held on to the application while he waited to hear back from the attorney general regarding the segregation laws. Meanwhile, Sweatt met with Painter who informed him that although his credentials were adequate enough he could not allow him to enter UT. Painter went on to tell Sweatt “there is nothing available to you except for out-of-state scholarships”. The Court of Civil Appeals would later write that "he possessed every essential qualification for admission, except that of race, upon which ground alone his application was denied." The attorney general decided to uphold the segregation laws and denied Sweatt entrance to UT; Sweatt responded by filing suit against Painter on May 16, 1946. The case went to court, and the judge's decision was that Texas had to build an equal law school within a six-month time frame. After six months had passed the judge threw out the case because Texas A&M had planned a resolution to provide legal education for blacks. Sweatt and the NAACP decided to file an appeal for that original ruling. On May 26, 1947, it was brought to a lower court who agreed with the previous ruling of the Texas A&M planned resolution. Later, in June 1950, the Supreme Court decided that students were not offered an equal quality law education in the state of Texas, and as a result, UT would have to admit qualified black applicants. On September 19, 1950, Sweatt registered for classes at the UT law school. However, as a result of the tremendous amount of stress and emotional trauma from the long drawn out court cases, Sweatt's mental and physical health had taken a turn for the worse.

== Later years ==
As Sweatt's health further declined, causing him to miss classes, he obtained poor grades and failed. These same tensions created a gap between him and his wife, who later divorced him. In the summer of 1952 he decided to withdraw from law school due to the various health issues and failing grades. He later received a scholarship to Atlanta University Graduate School to study Social Work. In 1954 he graduated with a master's degree in Community Organizations. He moved to Cleveland and did some work for the NAACP and the National Urban League for eight years. He then returned to Atlanta to continue work for their Urban League for 23 years. Not only did he work for the Urban League Southern Regional Office with Clarence D. Coleman, J. Harvey Kerns, KBM Crooks, and Felton Alexander, but he also worked on a wide variety of projects, anything from voter registration to creating programs for southern blacks who migrated to the North. In 1963 Sweatt married Katherine Gaffney, with whom he had a daughter; later they adopted another one. Heman Marion Sweatt died on October 3, 1982, and his remains were cremated in Atlanta. The Travis County Courthouse, where his court case took place, was renamed the “Heman Marion Sweatt Travis County Courthouse" on October 21, 2005, and a college scholarship in the amount of $10,000 has been established in his name.
