= Brian Renfroe =

American labor union leader

Brian L. Renfroe (born April 7, 1980) is an American labor union leader.

Brian L. Renfroe is the 19th National President of the National Association of Letter Carriers, AFL-CIO, the union representing 295,000 active and retired city letter carriers employed by the United States Postal Service. He is the youngest national president in the union's history and its first from the Deep South. Born in Hattiesburg, Mississippi, Renfroe was educated at Oak Grove High School and the University of Southern Mississippi, before following his father in becoming a letter carrier. He joined the National Association of Letter Carriers (NALC), and was elected as president of his local branch in 2008, then as president of the Mississippi State Association of Letter Carriers in 2011.

Later in 2011, Renfroe was appointed as a staffer at the union's Washington, DC Headquarters as a member of Contract Administration Unit, focusing on issues around city delivery. In 2013, he became a special assistant to the union's president. In 2014, he was elected as the union's director of city delivery. He was appointed as the union's executive vice president in 2016 to fill a vacancy, and ran unopposed in 2018, resulting in being re-elected to the position. He won election as national president of NALC in 2022 and has served in that capacity since December of 2022.

Renfroe also serves on the AFL-CIO Executive Council.

Trade union offices
Preceded by Fredric V. Rolando	President of the National Association of Letter Carriers; 2023–present	Succeeded by Incumbent
