= Claude Cummings Jr. =

American labor union leader (born 1950s)

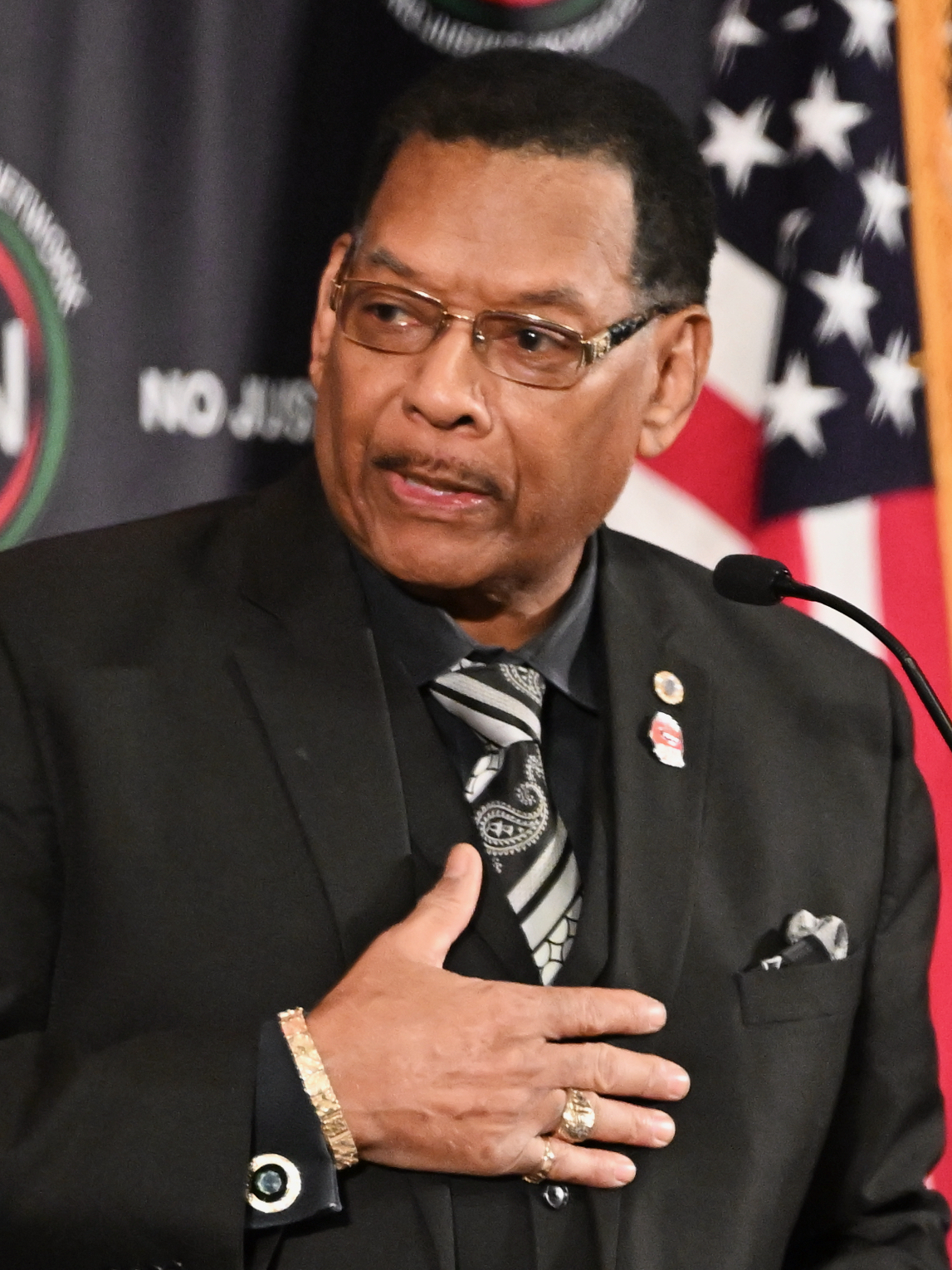
- Cummings in 2024
- Born: 1951 or 1952 (age 73–74); Houston, Texas, US
- Occupation: Trade unionist
- Title: President of the Communications Workers of America (since 2023)
- Political party: Democratic
- Spouse: Ruth Cummings

Claude Cummings Jr. (born 1951 or 1952) is an American labor union leader.

Born in the Kashmere Gardens area of Houston, Cummings attended Kashmere High School, then in 1973 found work at Southwestern Bell Telephone as a frame attendant. He followed his father in joining the Communications Workers of America union, but initially did not seek a leadership position. However, he became aware that women working in the union hall across the street were only permitted to take breaks outside, or in their restroom. This inspired him to lead a successful campaign for the women to be permitted to use the same break areas as men.

Cummings remained active in the union, eventually becoming president of his local, and then in 2011 winning election as vice president representing district 6 of the union. He also served on the union's executive board, and led its Human Rights Department. He was also active in the NAACP, the A. Philip Randolph Institute, and the Coalition of Black Trade Unionists.

In 2023, Cummings was elected as president of the union, defeating Ed Mooney by 59 percent to 41 percent of the vote. He became the first African-American leader of the union. As leader, he stated he would campaign against the contracting out of jobs, and support the ability of members to work from home.

Cummings spoke at the 2024 Democratic National Convention on August 19, 2024.

Trade union offices
Preceded by Chris Shelton	President of the Communication Workers of America; 2023–present	Incumbent
