= Vincent Sombrotto =

- Born: June 15, 1923; Manhattan, New York
- Died: January 10, 2013 (aged 89); Port Washington, New York
- Occupations: Labor leader, Letter carrier
- Spouse: Rae Sombrotto

Vincent Raymond Sombrotto (June 15, 1923 – January 10, 2013) was a letter carrier at Grand Central Station in New York City, and the 16th president of the National Association of Letter Carriers between 1978 and 2002. He was born in Manhattan in 1923 to an Italian father and an Irish mother. Sombrotto became an official member of the National Association of Letter Carriers in 1947 and played a huge part in the U.S. postal strike of 1970. Sombrotto helped to expand the union into more than 100 cities and involved more than 200,000 new members. He retired in 2002 and finished with over 300,000 members and died in 2013 aged 89 at Port Washington, New York.

== Early life ==
Vincent Raymond Sombrotto was born on June 15, 1923, in Manhattan, New York to Raymond and Agnes Sombrotto. His mother supported the family by working as a seamstress. He served in the US Navy during World War II. After his service, he worked as a truck driver before taking a part-time job sorting mail at the Grand Central Station post office. The job led him to delivering mail for the next twenty years.

== The Postal Strike of 1970 ==
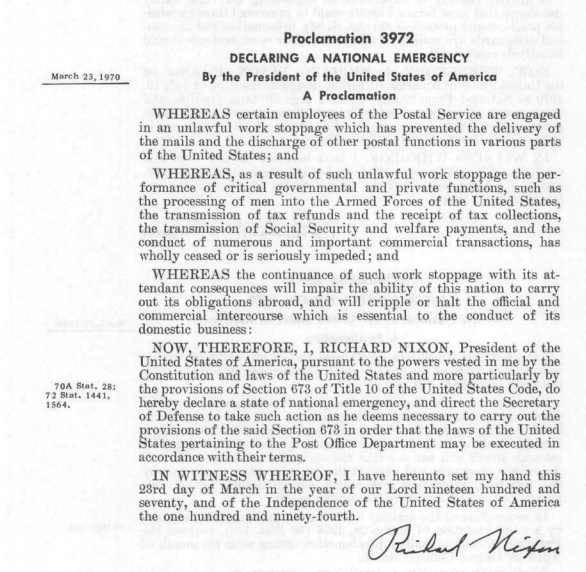
Nixon's Proclamation 3972 declared a national state of emergency, and authorized military control over the post office

In March 1970, members of NALC Branch 36 met in Manhattan and voted to call a wildcat strike, as postal employees were by law not permitted to collectively bargain. The strike was called in response to low wages, poor working conditions, and an act of Congress to increase the salaries of postal workers by 4% and their own pay by 41%.

Sombrotto and the members of the union began picketing the next day. The strike quickly spread throughout the country, growing to more than 210,000 workers. President Richard Nixon appeared on national television to order the employees back to work, but this only stiffened the will of the workers and led others to join the strike.

As the strike grew, Nixon used the military and the national guard as strike breakers. Instead of backing down, workers became more vocal and the strike gained support. Workers from other government agencies announced they would strike if Nixon pursued legal action against postal employees.

Nixon spoke to the nation again on March 23, asking workers to return to their jobs and announcing he would deploy the National Guard to deliver mail in New York. This announcement was accompanied by Proclamation 3972, which declared a national emergency. The national emergency proclamation was never revoked. Nixon then ordered 24,000 military personnel to begin distribution of mail. Operation Graphic Hand was, at its peak, more than 18,500 military personnel from the Army, National Guard, Army Reserve, Air National Guard, Navy, Air Force, and Navy Marine Reserve assigned to seventeen post offices in New York. The resulting expansion of presidential power was investigated in 1973 by an agency of Congress called the Special Committee on the Termination of the National Emergency, which warned the national state of emergency gave the president the right to seize property, organize the means of production, and to institute martial law.

After the soldiers were briefly called, a compromise was reached with the postal unions and the wildcat strike ended quickly.

The strike resulted in the passage of the Postal Reorganization Act of 1970 by the US Congress. The law established the United States Postal Service, a corporation-like independent agency with an official monopoly on the delivery of mail in the United States. It also gave the National Association of Letter Carriers and other postal unions the right to collectively negotiate a national agreement with the newly formed United States Postal Service.

== President of the NALC ==
On December 2, 1971, Sombrotto was elected President of New York Local 36. He and six other members of Branch 36 were known as "The Magnificent Seven". This group of union organizers worked to reform and democratize the union.

In 1978, Sombrotto was elected as President of the National Association of Letter Carriers, a position he held for the next 24 years. As president, Sombrotto led seven contract negotiations that provided basic wage increases in every contract. In 1993, he played a key role in helping to reform the Hatch Act, which forbade the partisan political activities of federal employees.

The union also increased its philanthropic activity under Sombrotto's leadership. In particular, the NALC raised millions of dollars for the Muscular Dystrophy Association, and their annual food drive has become one of the world's largest one-day food collection drives.

== Legacy ==
The Walter P. Reuther Library in Detroit, Michigan houses the NALC Office of the President: Vincent Sombrotto Records. This collection illustrates his time in office such as administrative functions, political involvement, organizational affiliations, and relationships with union members.

In 2014, New York Congresswoman Carolyn Maloney introduced a bill that passed the U.S. House of Representatives and was signed into law by President Barack Obama which renamed the Grand Central Station Post Office in New York City to the "Vincent R. Sombrotto Post Office."

The Vincent R. Sombrotto Memorial Park in Washington, D.C. is also named in his honor.

== See also ==
- National Association of Letter Carriers
- New York Letter Carriers Branch 36
- National Rural Letter Carriers' Association
- National Postal Mail Handlers Union
- American Postal Workers Union

Trade union offices
Preceded by J. Joseph Vacca	President of the National Association of Letter Carriers; 1979-2002	Succeeded by William H. Young
Preceded by Susan Bianchi-Sand	AFL-CIO delegate to the Trades Union Congress; 1991	Succeeded by Morton Bahr
