= Fredric Rolando =

Fredric V. Rolando (born March 28, 1953) is an American former labor union leader.

Rolando attended Florida International University, and graduated in psychology and criminology. He became a letter carrier with the United States Postal Service in Miami, and joined the National Association of Letter Carriers in 1978. In 1988, he was elected as president of his union local, in Sarasota. He became director of education for the Florida State Association of Letter Carriers, and held various short-term posts before, in 2002, becoming the union's national director of city delivery. In the role, he focused on preparing workers for increased automation.

In 2006, Rolando was elected as executive vice president of the union, and then in 2009 as its president. As leader of the union, he focused on opposing privatization and cuts to the postal service, on promoting postal voting, and on navigating through the COVID-19 pandemic. He also served as a vice-president of the AFL-CIO. He retired from the union in 2022, and from the AFL-CIO in 2023.

Trade union offices
Preceded by William H. Young	President of the National Association of Letter Carriers; 2009–2023	Succeeded by Brian Renfroe
