= Morton Bahr =

American trade unionist (1926–2019)

Morton Bahr (July 18, 1926 – July 30, 2019) was an American labor union leader. He served as the president of the Communications Workers of America from 1985 to 2005, and as the president of the Jewish Labor Committee from 1999 to 2001. He served on the AFL–CIO executive council.

Bahr was born in Brooklyn, N.Y. and enrolled in Brooklyn College at age 16, playing varsity baseball. He left before he graduated to enlist in the Merchant Marines during WWII.

Trade union offices
| Preceded by Glenn Watts | President of the Communication Workers of America; 1985–2005 | Succeeded by Larry Cohen |
| Preceded by Vincent Sombrotto | AFL-CIO delegate to the Trades Union Congress; 1992 | Succeeded by Thomas R. Donahue |
