= S. G. Atkins House =

Historic house in North Carolina, United States

- U.S. National Register of Historic Places
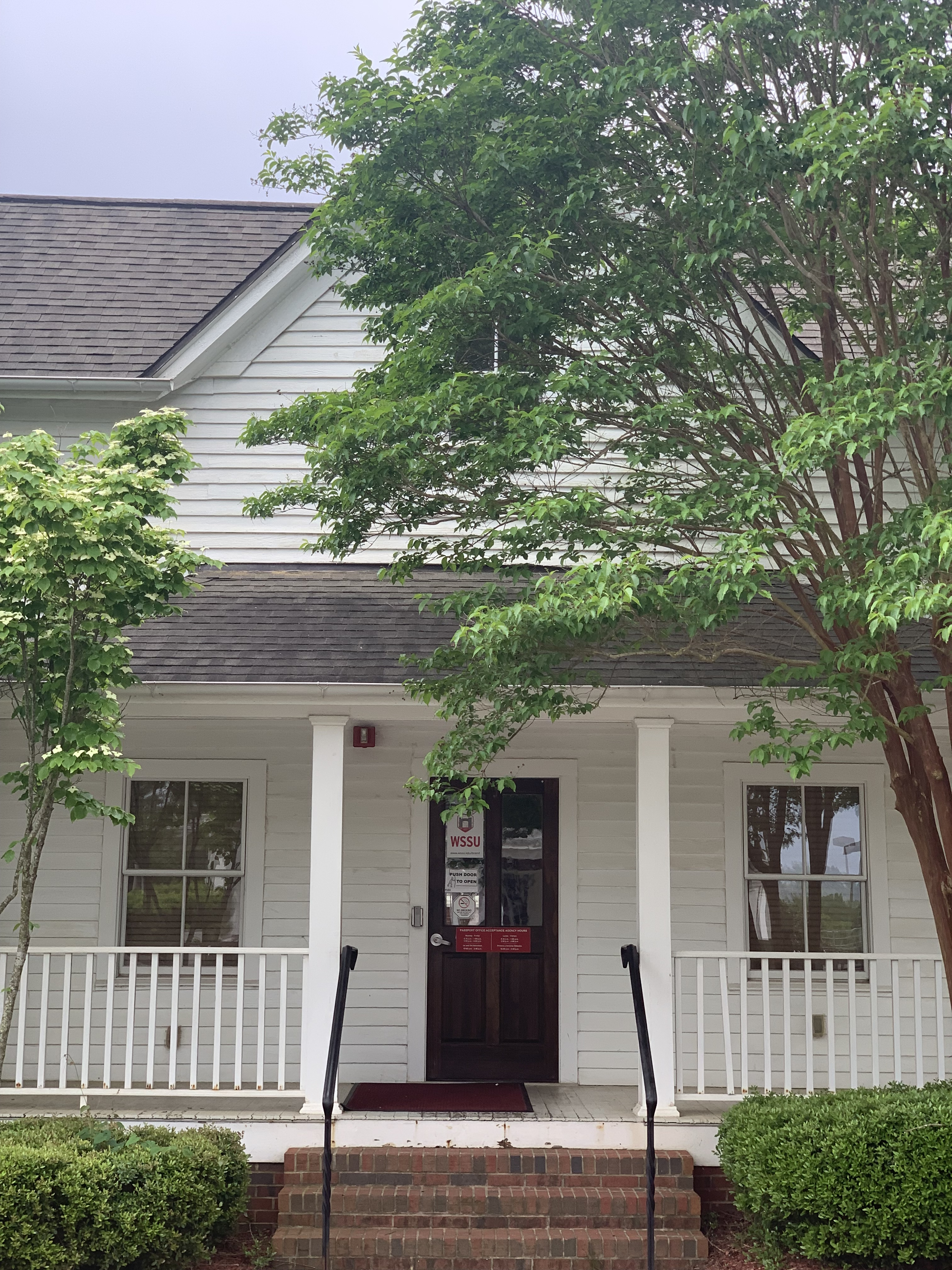

- Location within North Carolina Location within the United States
- Location: 346 Atkins St., Winston-Salem, North Carolina
- Coordinates: 36°5′32″N 80°13′45″W
- Area: less than one acre
- MPS: Slater Industrial Academy Houses TR
- NRHP reference No.: 79001704
- Added to NRHP: July 22, 1979

S. G. Atkins House is a historic home located at Winston-Salem, Forsyth County, North Carolina. The house was built about 1893, and is a two-story, three-bay, frame dwelling with rear additions. The front facade has a central gable and a hip-roofed porch. It was built by Dr. Simon Green Atkins, the founder of the Slater Industrial Academy for African-American students. The house was converted to apartments in 1951.

It was listed on the National Register of Historic Places in 1979.
