= Travis County Courthouse =

Judicial building in Austin, Texas

Heman Marion Sweatt Travis County Courthouse
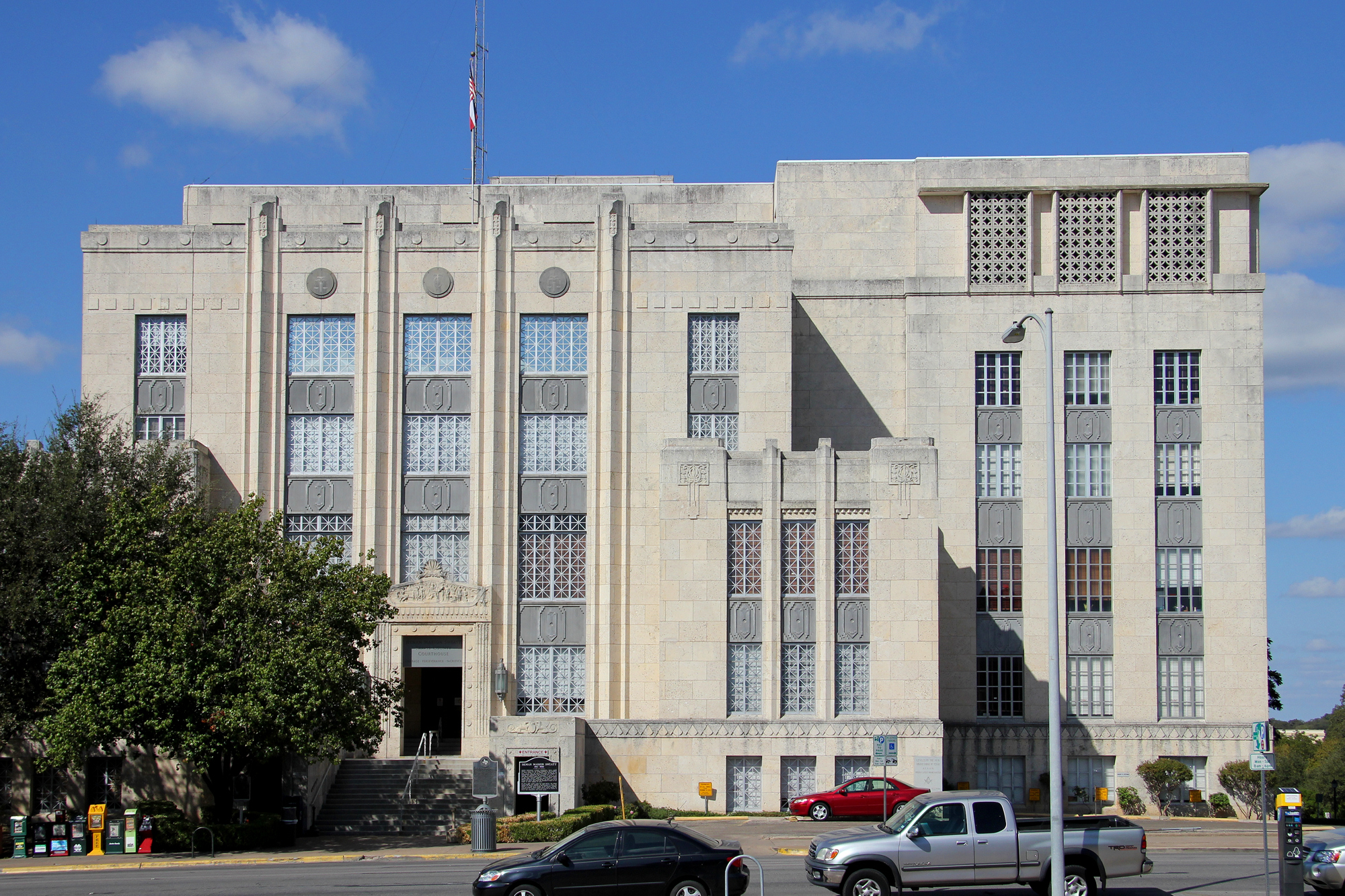
- East facade in 2011
- Interactive map of the Heman Marion Sweatt Travis County Courthouse area

General information
- Architectural style: PWA Moderne
- Location: 1000 Guadalupe St. Austin, Texas 78701
- Coordinates: 30.273°N 97.745°W
- Named for: Heman Marion Sweatt
- Opened: June 27, 1931
- Renovated: 1958, 1962
- Owner: Travis County, Texas

Height
- Height: 104 feet (32 m)

Technical details
- Floor count: 6
- Floor area: 125,000 square feet (11,600 m^{2})
- Lifts/elevators: 2

Design and construction
- Architect: Page Brothers
- Main contractor: H.E. Wattinger

The Heman Marion Sweatt Travis County Courthouse is the county courthouse for Travis County, Texas. Located in downtown Austin, Texas (the county seat), the courthouse holds civil and criminal trial courts and other functions of county government. The courthouse was built between 1930 and 1931 in the then-contemporary PWA Moderne style, and it was later expanded in 1958 and 1962.

== History ==
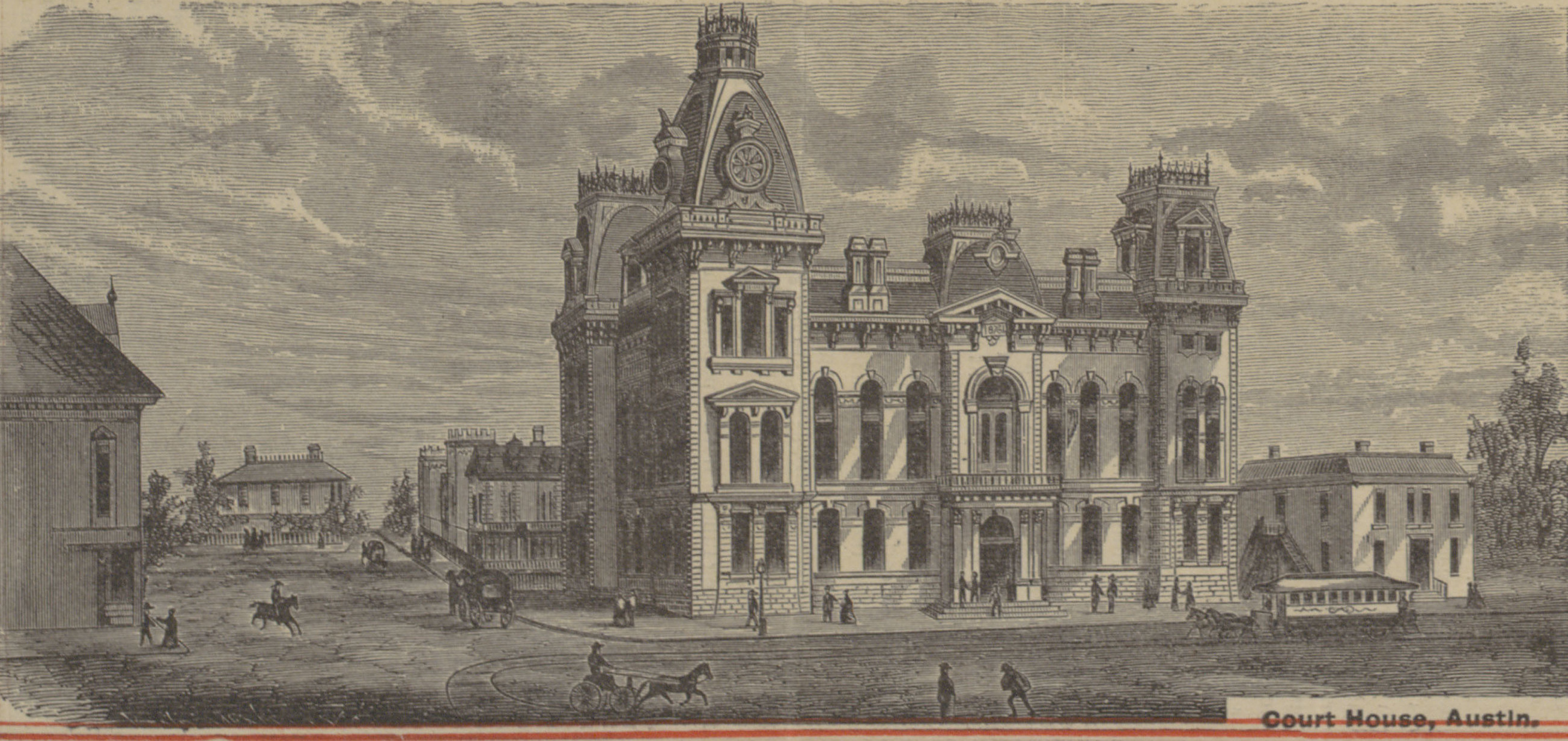
The second Travis County Courthouse in 1880

Travis County's first purpose-built courthouse was a modest two-story stone structure built in 1855 near Republic Square in downtown Austin. This courthouse was replaced by a larger building in 1876 and was eventually demolished in 1906. The second Travis County Courthouse was a three-story limestone building designed in a monumental Second Empire style, built along the south side of the Texas State Capitol. The county's needs outgrew this building, too, and in 1931 it was replaced by the current courthouse, after which it was used as office space for Texas state agencies and then finally demolished in 1964.

In 1930 the county selected a site on the north side of Wooldridge Park for the building of a third and larger county courthouse. Construction began with the laying of the cornerstone in 1930; on June 27, 1931, the courthouse was completed and had its grand opening, and the county's courts and offices moved in from the previous courthouse building. As the county continued to grow, substantial additions to the facility were made in 1958 and 1962.

=== Jail ===
When the courthouse opened in 1931 it did so with a jail on the top floor. From 1962 to 1964, this jail was expanded to additional floors.

In December 1972, twelve inmates brought suit against the county, alleging that the conditions in the then 280-person jail on the top two floors of the courthouse constituted cruel and unusual punishment. On July 31, 1974, Federal District Judge Jack Roberts wrote an opinion stating that county commissioners "have failed to meet their responsibilities in providing a safe and suitable jail for Travis County". On December 9, 1978, Travis County voters approved an $8.5 million bond package for a new jail.

Construction on the new jail began in 1981, and Travis County officially took ownership of the new jail in 1986 after costs had ballooned to more than $21 million. On October 21, 1988, US Magistrate Judge Stephen Capelle ordered the old jail closed by December 1990, however, the jail wound up being retired early, on April 6, 1990.

Coincidentally, the lawsuit that ultimately resulted in the closure of the jail was filed the same year as Ruiz v. Estelle, whose plaintiff, Austinite David Ruiz, alleged cruel and unusual punishment in the TDCJ Wynne Unit of Huntsville, Texas

=== Replacement efforts ===
In the early 2010s, as population growth in Travis County continued to strain the courthouse's capacity, the county made plans to replace the 1931 courthouse with a new, still larger facility. Officials selected a county-owned downtown lot near the site of the first county courthouse, and on August 18, 2015, the Travis County Commissioners Court voted to propose a $287 million municipal bond issuance to fund a new courthouse complex. In the November 2015 general election, however, the bond measure was rejected by Travis County voters, and the county instead enacted a "preservation master plan" in January 2016 to provide for necessary repairs to the existing courthouse.

After the defeat of the courthouse bond, the county began pursuing ownership of the 1936 United States Courthouse that had recently been left vacant by the completion of a new federal courthouse complex. At a press conference on December 29, 2016, officials from Travis County and the federal judiciary and local U.S. Representative Lloyd Doggett announced that ownership of the old federal courthouse had been transferred to Travis County. The county then budgeted $28 million to bring the structure up to current building codes and adapt it to house the county probate courts by 2020.

On July 10, 2018, Travis County entered a negotiation agreement with developers to design and build a new downtown court facility, and on January 15, 2019, the county approved funding for the project. Construction began with a groundbreaking ceremony on May 31, 2019, with the new facility scheduled for completion in 2022.

=== Namesake ===
In 1946, an African-American law student named Heman Marion Sweatt was denied admission to the University of Texas School of Law on the grounds that the Constitution of Texas prohibited racially integrated education. Sweatt sued the University with the support of the NAACP, and his suit was heard in Texas District Court in the Travis County Courthouse in June 1946 and again in May 1947, where Sweatt's case was argued by a young Thurgood Marshall.

After the state established a temporary "School of Law of the Texas State University for Negroes," the district court found that the state had fulfilled its constitutional obligations to Sweatt; Sweatt appealed his suit to the Supreme Court of the United States, however, and in 1950 the Supreme Court ruled in Sweatt v. Painter that Sweatt should be admitted to the University of Texas. On October 21, 2005, Travis County renamed its courthouse the "Heman Marion Sweatt Travis County Courthouse" in honor of this notable trial in the history of the Civil Rights Movement.

== Architecture ==
The carved lintel above the main entrance in the east facade

The Travis County Courthouse is a six-story steel-and-concrete building clad with cream-colored limestone. Its design exemplifies the PWA Moderne architectural style of many Great Depression-era public buildings, with its symmetrical rectangular forms, recessed vertical window bays, and smooth stonework exterior decorated with neoclassical flourishes and geometric detailing. The building was designed by the firm of local architect Charles Henry Page (well known for his work on other Texas courthouses of the period). The construction contractor was H.E. Wattinger.

=== Exterior ===
The original main entry (now closed for security reasons) is in the east facade, where a staircase leads from street level up to bronze doors within a projecting doorframe, with an elaborately carved lintel depicting a judge releasing shackled prisoners to a celebrating crowd. The windows in the building's central mass are joined into five recessed vertical window bays, with decorative cast-iron spandrels between the windows and pilasters running vertically between bays. The facade was originally symmetrical north and south, but large expansions to the north side (added during renovations in 1958 and 1962) now give the building a lopsided silhouette.

=== Interior ===
The building's interior exhibits Art Moderne and Art Deco finishes and detailing. The structure was originally built to hold three courts and all county government offices, with the county jail on the top two floors. As of 2017, it now houses two county civil courts, a justice of the peace court, thirteen Texas district courts, two district clerks, and two probate courts, though the probate courts are set to be relocated into the former federal courthouse building by 2020.

== See also ==
- List of county courthouses in Texas
