= Chris Shelton (unionist) =

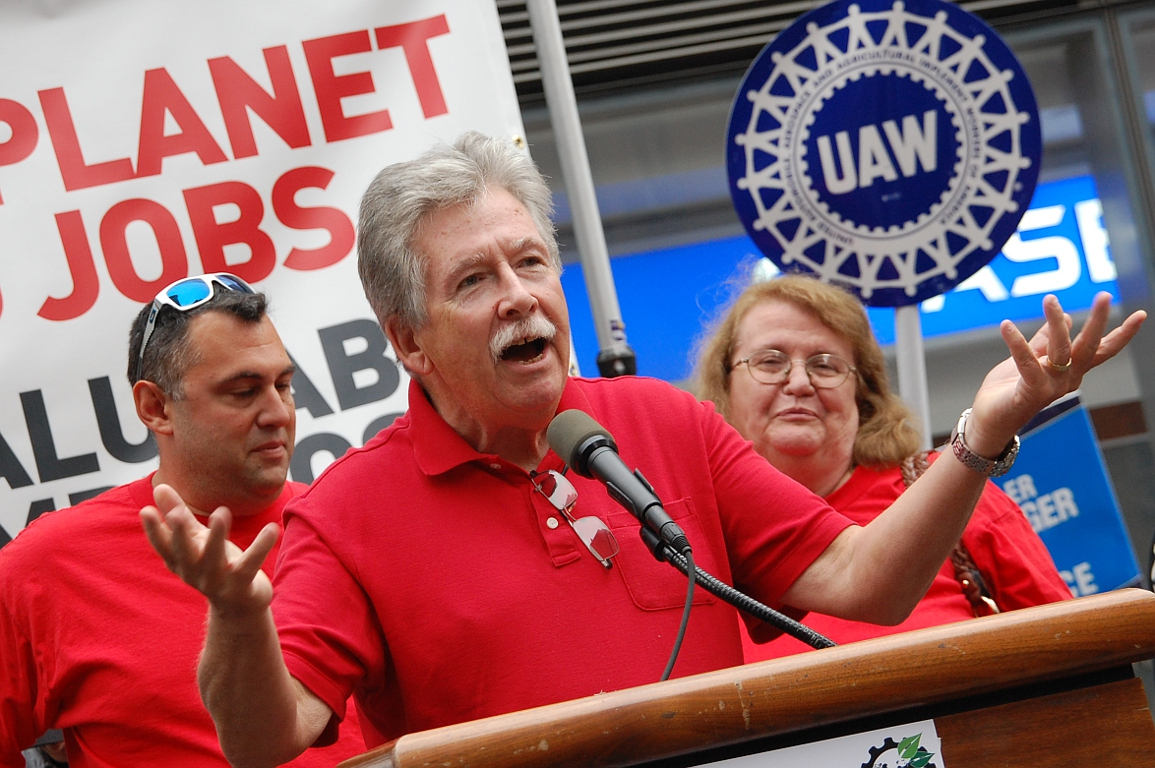
Shelton (center) in 2014

Christopher M. Shelton is a retired U.S. labor union leader.

Shelton grew up in the Bronx. He began working for New York Telephone in 1968, as an outside technician. He joined the Communication Workers of America (CWA) union, and became a shop steward. He held numerous positions in his local union, then in 1988 began working full-time for the national union. He became vice-president of the union's district 1 in 2005, and then in 2015 won election as the union's president. In 2016, he led a strike involving 40,000 workers at Verizon. He also served as a vice-president of the AFL-CIO. He retired in 2023.

Trade union offices
Preceded by Larry Cohen	President of the Communication Workers of America; 2015–2023	Succeeded by Claude Cummings Jr.
