= Larry Cohen (union leader) =

American labor leader

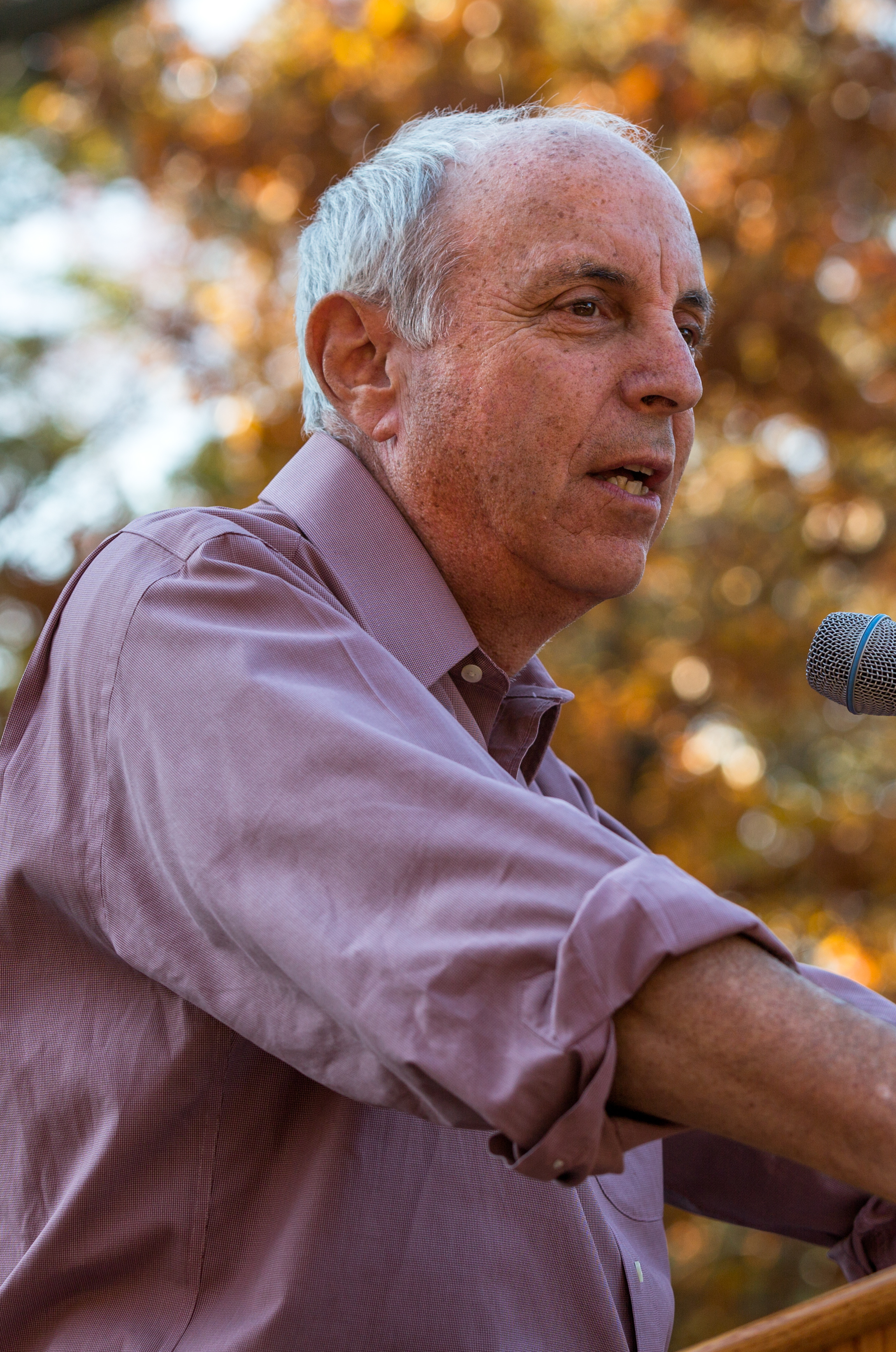

4th President of the Communications Workers of America
- In office 2005–2015
- Preceded by: Morton Bahr
- Succeeded by: Chris Shelton

Personal details
- Born: 1949 or 1950 (age 75–76)
- Party: Democratic

Larry Cohen is the former president of the Communications Workers of America, a 700,000-member labor union representing workers in Canada and the United States. Cohen was first elected to his most recent position, by acclamation, in 2005, and left in 2015 succeeded by Chris Shelton.

A native of Philadelphia, Pennsylvania, Cohen became active in the union as a state worker in New Jersey, where he led a successful organizing drive which eventually brought 36,000 state workers into the union. In 1980, he was appointed a staff representative. He was promoted in 1982 to New Jersey area director and again in 1985 to assistant to the CWA vice president for District 1. In 1986 he was called on to serve as assistant to the CWA president and director of organizing, a position he held until his election as executive vice president in August 1998.

Throughout his career, Cohen has chaired major contract negotiations in both the public and private sectors, at employers including Verizon and AT&T, as well as Cingular Wireless (now AT&T Mobility). Cohen was one of the first to recognize changes in telecommunications through the convergence of video, voice and data technologies, and the need to unify unionized workers in these sectors. He also has worked to expand CWA – the union now represents workers in information technology and communications; print and broadcast media and publishing; health care, education and public workers; manufacturing and the airline industry.

On the international scene, Cohen has worked to strengthen the effectiveness and solidarity of the international labor movement. He has expanded alliances with CWA's counterpart unions in Latin America, Europe and Asia, and was elected president of the 2.5 million-worker Union Network International Telecom Sector in 2001, serving until 2007. As president, he built alliances and support for telecom workers around the world, including in Mexico, Taiwan, South Africa, Germany and other countries.

He is a founder of American Rights at Work, an co-founder of Jobs with Justice, and a member of the Democratic National Committee.

In 2015, Cohen joined presidential candidate Bernie Sanders's campaign as a liaison to organized labor, and worked to gain union support for the Sanders campaign. Sanders had run a progressive grassroots campaign, with his average contribution amounting to $27. Ultimately Sander's opponent Hillary Clinton received more support from union leaders, although Bernie's message resonated with union members. Clinton narrowed the divide on policy between her and Sanders, making it more difficult for Unions to side with Sanders as Clinton was considered the likely victor. Cohen considered himself a champion of the Progressive Platform, and joined Our Revolution, a political organization formed by Bernie Sanders formed after the primary.

== Our Revolution ==
In 2016, Cohen joined Our Revolution, a political organization formed by Bernie Sanders. Cohen is the chairman of Our Revolution. He believes that progressives can leverage the success of the Sanders campaign to reach out to voters.
