= Willie Porter (basketball) =

American basketball player

Personal information
- Born: July 3, 1942 Winston-Salem, North Carolina, U.S.
- Died: November 4, 1992 (aged 50) Winston-Salem, North Carolina, U.S.
- Listed height: 6 ft 7 in (2.01 m)
- Listed weight: 205 lb (93 kg)

Career information
- High school: Atkins (Winston-Salem, North Carolina)
- College: Tennessee State (1961–1964)
- NBA draft: 1965: 16th round, 108th overall pick
- Drafted by: Cincinnati Royals
- Position: Power forward
- Number: 33, 30, 15

Career history
- 1967–1968: Oakland Oaks
- 1968: Pittsburgh / Minnesota Pipers
- 1968: Houston Mavericks

Career highlights
- ABA champion (1968)
- Stats at Basketball Reference

Willie Williams Porter Jr. (July 3, 1942 – November 4, 1992) was an American professional basketball player who played two seasons (1967–68) in the American Basketball Association (ABA) as a member of the Oakland Oaks, Pittsburgh / Minnesota Pipers and the Houston Mavericks. A power forward who played college basketball for the Tennessee State Tigers, he was selected by the Cincinnati Royals during the 16^{th} round of the 1965 NBA draft.

Porter scored the first points in the first ABA game ever played on October 13, 1967, doing so on a tip-in for the Oaks against the Anaheim Amigos at the Oakland Coliseum.

Porter attended Atkins High School in Winston-Salem, North Carolina, and graduated in 1960. He received a Bachelor of Science in physical education from Tennessee State University and a Master of Arts in counseling from California State University. Porter worked for the R. J. Reynolds Tobacco Company. He was married to Barbara Davis-Porter and had two children.

On November 4, 1992, Porter died of an apparent heart attack which he suffered while arguing over the cause of a car accident. He had been driving near his home in Winston-Salem when he was involved in a collision with another driver. Porter did not suffer any injuries but was engaged in an argument with the other driver when he had his heart attack and died shortly after he was taken to Forsyth Medical Center. Porter's family said that he had a heart condition and the other driver was not charged for his involvement in the accident.
