= Lawrence Joel =

US Army Sgt 1st Class, Medal of Honor, Silver Star, Purple Heart (1928–1984)

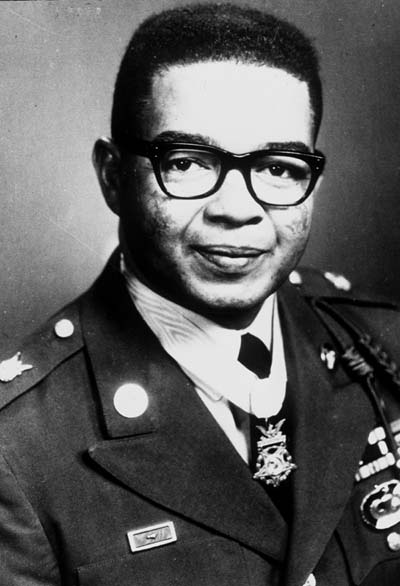
- Born: February 22, 1928; Winston-Salem, North Carolina, U.S.
- Died: February 4, 1984 (aged 55); Winston-Salem, North Carolina, U.S.
- Burial place: Arlington National Cemetery
- Military career
- Allegiance: United States
- Branch: United States Army
- Service years: 1946–1973
- Rank: Sergeant first class
- Units: 1st Battalion (Airborne), 503rd Infantry; 173rd Airborne Brigade
- Conflicts: Korean War; Vietnam War (WIA): Operation Hump
- Awards: Medal of Honor; Silver Star; Purple Heart

Lawrence Joel (February 22, 1928 – February 4, 1984) was a United States Army soldier who served in the Korean and Vietnam Wars. While serving in South Vietnam as a medic with the rank of specialist five assigned to 1st Battalion of the 503rd Infantry in the 173rd Airborne Brigade, Joel received the Silver Star and the Medal of Honor for his heroism in a battle with the Viet Cong that occurred on November 8, 1965. He was the first medic to earn the Medal of Honor during the Vietnam War and the first living black American to receive this medal since the Spanish–American War in 1898.

== Childhood ==
Joel was born in Winston-Salem, North Carolina, the third of 16 children. Due to the extreme poverty of his family, from the age of 8 to 18, Joel was raised by a neighboring family, the Samuels. Joel attended city public schools, including Atkins High School, and joined the Merchant Marine for one year. In 1946, at age 18, Joel decided to join the United States Army, making a career out of it. He enlisted in New York City.

== Vietnam War ==
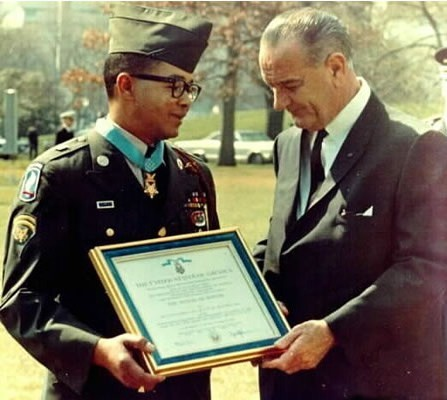
President Johnson presenting a then-Specialist Six Joel with Medal of Honor and Certificate

On November 8, 1965, then-Specialist Five Lawrence Joel and his battalion of paratroopers were sent on a patrol for Viet Cong soldiers near Bien Hoa, War Zone "D" in South Vietnam, conducting Operation Hump. They shortly found themselves in a Viet Cong ambush, outnumbered six to one. Under heavy gunfire, Joel did his duty as a medic, administering first aid to wounded soldiers. Joel defied orders to stay to the ground and risked his life to help the many wounded soldiers; nearly every soldier in the lead squad was either wounded or killed in the battle. Even after being shot twice (once in the right thigh and once in the right calf), Joel continued to do his job; he bandaged his wounds and continued to help the wounded in not only his unit, but in the nearby company as well. When his medical supplies were depleted, he hobbled around the battlefield for more, using a makeshift crutch while SP4 Randy Eickhoff ran ahead of him and provided covering fire. Eickhoff was later awarded the Silver Star and Purple Heart for his actions. Joel attended to thirteen troops and saved the life of one soldier who had a severe chest wound by improvising and placing a plastic bag over the soldier's chest in order to seal the wound until the supplies were refreshed. After the firefight which lasted over twenty-four hours, Joel was hospitalized and shipped to locations including Saigon and Tokyo to recover. Shortly after, he received the Silver Star for his activities.

== Medal of Honor citation ==
On March 9, 1967, on the White House lawn, President Lyndon Johnson presented Joel with the Medal of Honor for his service in the Vietnam War. His citation reads as follows:

For conspicuous gallantry and intrepidity at the risk of life above and beyond the call of duty. SP6 Joel demonstrated indomitable courage, determination, and professional skill when a numerically superior and well-concealed Viet Cong element launched a vicious attack which wounded or killed nearly every man in the lead squad of the company. After treating the men wounded by the initial burst of gunfire, he bravely moved forward to assist others who were wounded while proceeding to their objective. While moving from man to man, he was struck in the right leg by machine gun fire. Although painfully wounded his desire to aid his fellow soldiers transcended all personal feeling. He bandaged his own wound and self-administered morphine to deaden the pain enabling him to continue his dangerous undertaking. Through this period of time, he constantly shouted words of encouragement to all around him. Then, completely ignoring the warnings of others, and his pain, he continued his search for wounded, exposing himself to hostile fire; and, as bullets dug up the dirt around him, he held plasma bottles high while kneeling completely engrossed in his life saving mission. Then, after being struck a second time and with a bullet lodged in his thigh, he dragged himself over the battlefield and succeeded in treating 13 more men before his medical supplies ran out. Displaying resourcefulness, he saved the life of one man by placing a plastic bag over a severe chest wound to congeal the blood. As 1 of the platoons pursued the Viet Cong, an insurgent force in concealed positions opened fire on the platoon and wounded many more soldiers. With a new stock of medical supplies, SP6 Joel again shouted words of encouragement as he crawled through an intense hail of gunfire to the wounded men. After the 24-hour battle subsided and the Viet Cong dead numbered 410, snipers continued to harass the company. Throughout the long battle, SP6 Joel never lost sight of his mission as a medical aidman and continued to comfort and treat the wounded until his own evacuation was ordered. His meticulous attention to duty saved a large number of lives and his unselfish, daring example under most adverse conditions was an inspiration to all. SP6 Joel's profound concern for his fellow soldiers, at the risk of his life above and beyond the call of duty are in the highest traditions of the U.S. Army and reflect great credit upon himself and the Armed Forces of his country.

== Winston-Salem parade ==
On April 8, 1967, Winston-Salem held a parade, the first time the city had ever held a military parade to recognize a single individual, to honor Lawrence Joel. He grew up on the east side of the city, a predominantly African-American section of Winston-Salem at the time. The New York Times called it the biggest tribute the city had ever staged.

== Retirement ==
Lawrence Joel retired from military service in 1973.

On February 4, 1984, Joel died of complications from diabetes. He is buried in Arlington National Cemetery in Section 46, lot 15–1, adjacent to the Memorial Amphitheater.

== Honors and awards ==
The first military memorial named in his honor was Joel Drive, which encircles Blanchfield Community Hospital at Fort Campbell, Kentucky, dedicated in 1985.

In memory of Lawrence Joel and all Forsyth County veterans, the Winston-Salem Board of Aldermen (now City Council) in February 1986 decided to name the city's new coliseum the Lawrence Joel Veterans Memorial Coliseum. Construction for the coliseum began one year later and opened in 1989. In 2007, a study funded by the Winston-Salem City Council opened the possibility of selling the coliseum's naming rights to some corporation.

The Joel Auditorium at Walter Reed Army Medical Center in Washington, D.C. was named after Lawrence Joel.

U.S. Army clinics at Fort Benning, Georgia and Fort Bragg, North Carolina, are named after Joel.

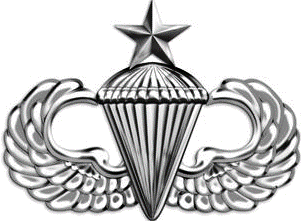

=== Awards ===
- Combat Medical Badge
- Senior Parachutist Badge
- Medal of Honor
- Silver Star
- Purple Heart
- Army Good Conduct Medal with two Knots
- Army of Occupation Medal
- World War II Victory Medal
- National Defense Service Medal
- Armed Forces Expeditionary Medal
- Korean Service Medal
- Vietnam Service Medal with one Silver star
- Vietnam Campaign Medal
- United Nations Korea Medal
- Republic of Korea Presidential Unit Citation
- United States Presidential Unit Citation

== See also ==
- List of Medal of Honor recipients
- List of Medal of Honor recipients for the Vietnam War
