= Susan Bianchi-Sand =

American unionist (born 1947)

Susan Jane Bianchi-Sand (born January 8, 1947) is an American former labor unionist.

Born in Buffalo, New York, Bianchi-Sand studied at the University of Maryland, before becoming a flight attendant with United Airlines. She joined the Association of Flight Attendants (AFA), and in 1979 was elected as the union's vice president, then in 1986 as its president. In this role, she successfully lobbied for a smoking ban on domestic flights in the United States. She was also elected as a vice-president of the AFL-CIO, at the time, one of only three women to sit on the federation's executive council.

In 1991, Bianchi-Sand was defeated for re-election as leader of the AFA. She left the union movement in 1992, to become executive director of the National Committee on Pay Equity. In 1999, she became the director of United American Nurses, and negotiated the union's affiliation to the AFL-CIO.

Trade union offices
Preceded by Linda Puchala	President of the Association of Flight Attendants; 1986–1991	Succeeded by Dee Maki
Preceded by Gerald McEntee	AFL-CIO delegate to the Trades Union Congress; 1990	Succeeded by Vincent Sombrotto
