= Ike Hill =

American football player (born 1947)

No. 28, 17, 82
- Position: Defensive back

Personal information
- Born: April 15, 1947 (age 79); Winston-Salem, North Carolina, U.S.
- Listed height: 5 ft 10 in (1.78 m)
- Listed weight: 180 lb (82 kg)

Career information
- High school: Atkins (Winston-Salem)
- College: Catawba College
- NFL draft: 1970: 9th round, 232nd overall pick

Career history
- Buffalo Bills (1970–1971); Chicago Bears (1973–1974); Miami Dolphins (1976)

Career NFL statistics
- Receptions: 22
- Receiving yards: 283
- Receiving TDs: 2
- Stats at Pro Football Reference

Talmadge "Ike" Hill (born April 15, 1947) is an American former professional football player who was a defensive back for five seasons in the National Football League (NFL) with the Buffalo Bills, Chicago Bears and Miami Dolphins from 1970 to 1976. Hill played in a total of 49 career games. He played college football for the Catawba Indians.
