= Simon G. Atkins Academic & Technology High School =

American public school in North Carolina

Simon Green Atkins Academic & Technology High School

Location
- 3605 Old Greensboro Rd; Winston-Salem, North Carolina 27101; United States
- 36°06′37″N 80°11′44″W

Information
- School type: Public
- Motto: "Where Tradition Meets the Future"
- Founded: 2005 (21 years ago)
- School board: Winston-Salem/Forsyth County Schools
- Superintendent: Dr. Don Phipps
- Principal: Dr. Keisha Gabriel
- Staff: 68.05 (FTE)
- Grades: 9–12
- Enrollment: 1,190 (2023-2024)
- Student to teacher ratio: 17.49
- Language: English
- Colors: Maroon and gold
- Mascot: Camel
- Team name: Atkins Camels
- Website: www.wsfcs.k12.nc.us/o/atkinshs

Simon G. Atkins Academic & Technology High School is a high school in Winston-Salem, North Carolina (Winston-Salem/Forsyth County Schools). It opened in the fall of 2005 as a technology magnet school. Atkins is distinct in that it houses three separate academies: Biotechnology, Computer Technology, and Pre-Engineering. These departments were originally three separate schools under the Atkins Complex, but as of the 2010–11 school year, the schools were integrated into one establishment, for administrative ease. The three departments offer students various "majors," which provide focused environments in which students can explore their interests before they enroll in college. The school is named after Simon Green Atkins.

== Facility ==
The school was designed for 1,000 students, with core space for 1,400. Among the 28 classrooms, special labs and technology spaces were planned for hands-on learning in computer engineering, chemistry, biology, biotechnology research, physics, and physical science. An open cafeteria space features ample natural lighting and high ceilings with exposed structural components. The exposed structure is continued throughout the main gymnasium, the auxiliary gym, and the school's central circulation spine. The state-of-the-art auditorium, with seating for 800, features a movable wall to accommodate different uses. In addition to the typical functions of a school media center, the space has computer and classroom areas equipped with electronic whiteboards and network access, and multimedia workstation available for student use.

== Athletics ==
Sports available include football, lacrosse, wrestling, cross country, track, tennis, swimming, and soccer, among others. A football and track stadium is located on the campus, adjacent to a tennis court, as well as football and soccer practice fields.

=== State Championships ===
Simon G. Atkins Academic & Technology has won the following North Carolina High School Athletic Association (NCHSAA) team state championships:

- Men's Indoor Track & Field: 2020 (1A/2A)

== Controversy ==
In 2015 two students were charged with making felony threats of violence against the school. One of these student's family made accusations of administrative disciplinary overreach due to actions taken by the school administration over threats of violence from a teenage student. They filed a lawsuit alleging the investigation was mishandled because the student was questioned without his parents being present after they asked to be.
