= Stamp Out Hunger Food Drive =

United States Postal Service charity initiative

- Stamp Out Hunger Food Drive logo

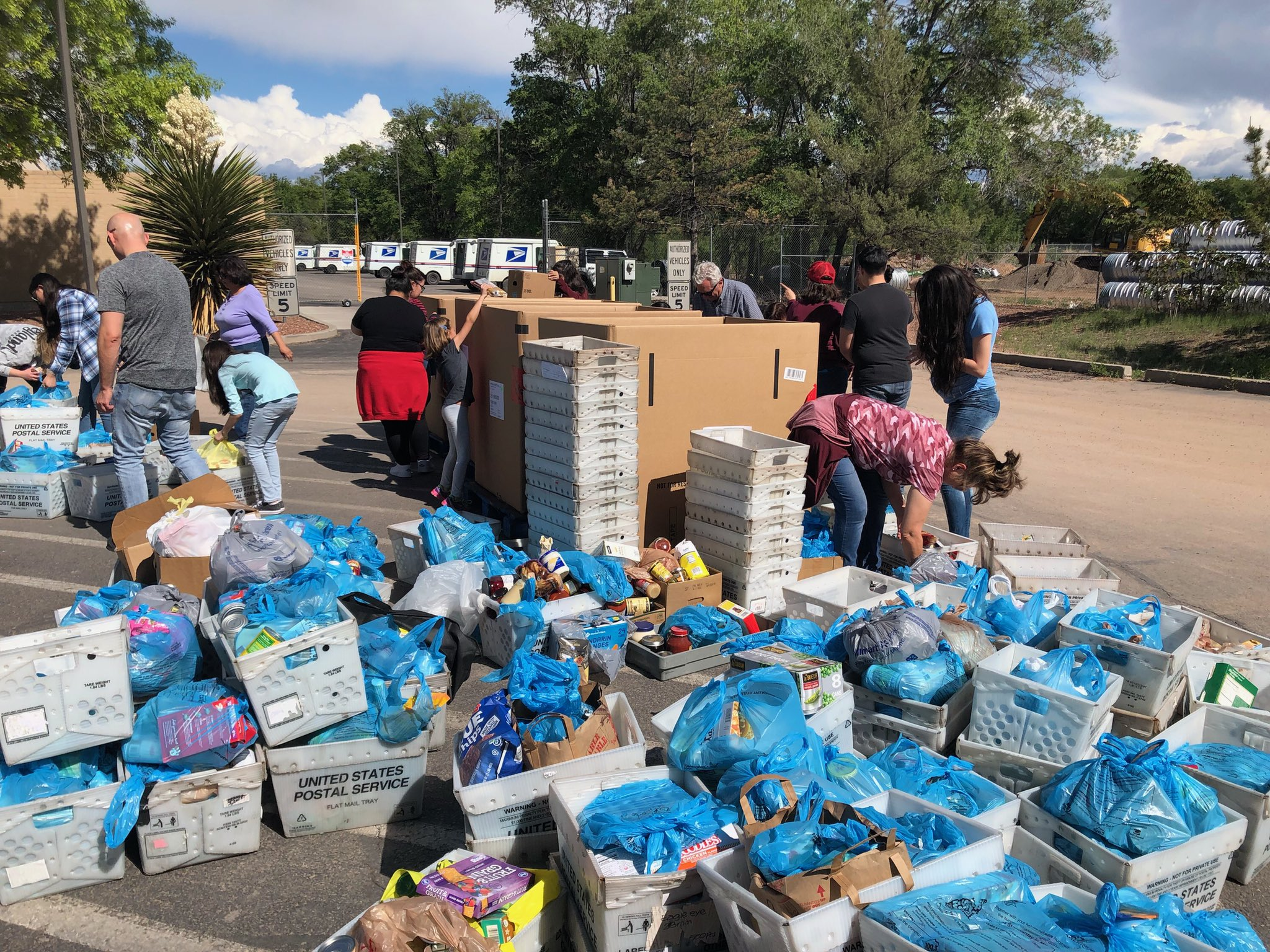
- Stamp Out Hunger Food Drive 2019 in Albuquerque, New Mexico.
- Status: Active
- Genre: Food drive
- Frequency: Annually
- Country: USA
- Years active: 33
- Inaugurated: May 15, 1993
- Website: www.nalc.org/community-service/food-drive

The Stamp Out Hunger Food Drive is a charitable initiative conducted by the National Association of Letter Carriers, United States Postal Service, & the National Rural Letter Carriers' Association in the United States to make significant donations of food to organizations serving needy persons.

== History ==
For many years, a number of branches (locals) of the NALC had collected food for the needy as part of their community service effort.

The national, coordinated effort by the NALC to help fight hunger in America grew out of discussions in 1991 by a number of leaders at the time, including NALC President Vincent R. Sombrotto, AFL-CIO Community Services Director Joseph Velasquez, USPS Postmaster General Anthony M. Frank, and NALC Director of Public Relations Drew Von Bergen. A pilot drive was held in 10 cities in October 1991, and it proved so successful that work began immediately on making it a nationwide effort.

After receiving input from food banks and pantries, the NALC decided that the best time of year for this food drive to take place would be in the late spring. Most food banks start running out of food this time of year because the largest donations are made around Thanksgiving and Christmas.

A revamped food drive was organized for May 15, 1993. The goal for the organization was to have at least one branch of the National Association of Letter Carriers participate from all 50 states. The first year of the nationwide effort collected over 11 million pounds of food, which was a one-day record in the United States, with more than 220 union branches covering more than 1,000 communities participating.

Thereafter, the national drive was set for the second Saturday of May each year.

In 2010, 77.1 million pounds of food were collected, which helped the food drive surpass the 1 billion pound mark in total food collected over its history.

In 2016, the food drive collected a record 80 million pounds of nonperishable food, raising the total amount of donations picked up over the quarter-century history of the drive to more than 1.5 billion pounds.

In 2017, the food drive celebrated its 25th anniversary. The official magazine of the National Association of Letter Carriers, The Postal Record, ran a history of the drive's first 25 years, featuring an interview with Drew Von Bergen, a former NALC employee who coordinated the drives for many years.

In 2010, the National Rural Letter Carriers' Association became a full partner in the annual drive (though the NRLCA had participated in the drive from its inception), The food drive was not held in 2020 or 2021 due to COVID-19.

== How it works ==
The Stamp Out Hunger Food Drive is held in all 50 states every year on the second Saturday of May: on this day, mail carriers both deliver mail and collect food donations. It is held in May because most food banks face a depletion in donations from the holiday season. Today, the Stamp Out Hunger effort is the United States' largest single-day food drive.

== Impact ==
In 2016, the food drive collected a record 80 million pounds of nonperishable food, raising the total amount of donations picked up over the quarter-century history of the drive to more than 1.5 billion pounds.

The NALC food drive has also received two Presidential Certificates of Achievement.

== Partnerships ==
The Stamp Out Hunger Food Drive has many supporters including The U.S. Postal Service, Campbell Soup Company, Cox Target Media, Valpak, the National Rural Letter Carriers Association, the Feeding America food bank network, the United Way of America and its local United Ways, the AFL-CIO Community Services network, Uncle Bob's Self Storage, and AARP.

Signing on as national food drive partners in 2017 were the U.S. Postal Service, the National Rural Letter Carriers' Association, the United Food and Commercial Workers International Union (UFCW), United Way Worldwide, AFL-CIO, AARP Foundation, Valpak] and Valassis.

== Donations ==
The Stamp Out Hunger Food Drive will take donations of nonperishable foods in non-breakable containers such as cereals, dry milk, cereal bars, baby formula, canned fruit, canned vegetables, canned meats and fish, boxed or canned juices, canned soups, peanut butter, boxed instant food, pasta/boxed pasta, boxed rice, and dried beans.

== Trademarks ==
As of December 2015, the phrase "Stamp Out Hunger" is a registered trademark of the National Association of Letter Carriers. As of January 2017, the official logo of the Stamp Out Hunger Food Drive is a registered trademark of National Association of Letter Carriers.

== Spokespersons ==
Actor Edward James Olmos is the official national spokesperson for the Stamp Out Hunger Food Drive.
