= Carter Walker Wesley =

- Born: April 29, 1892; Houston, Texas
- Died: November 10, 1969 (aged 77); Houston, Texas
- Education: Fisk University, Northwestern University

Carter Walker Wesley (April 29, 1892 – November 10, 1969) was an American lawyer, newspaperman and political activist.

== Personal life ==
Carter Walker Wesley was born in 1892 in Houston, Texas. He grew up in the city's first and most successful black neighborhood, Freedmen's Town. Shortly after completing high school, Carter moved to Nashville, Tennessee, and graduated magna cum laude in 1917 from Fisk University.

Taking inspiration from W. E. B. Du Bois and other black leaders and writers, Wesley joined the NAACP and started a career in law. Soon after graduation, World War I started and interrupted his plans. He enrolled in a black officer's training camp at Fort Des Moines in Iowa, and eventually was commissioned as a first lieutenant.

Wesley had three children and was married to Dorris Wooten. After a career as a lawyer and newspaper publisher, he died in Houston on November 10, 1969, aged 77, and was buried in Paradise Cemetery (North), in Houston, Texas.

== Military career ==
During World War I, Wesley volunteered to be in the U.S. Army through a program called the black officers training program. He eventually went on to serve as a lieutenant in France until 1918. Wesley and his unit were sent to Europe where he fought in the Argonne and Verdun regions.

In 1918, Wesley was assigned to 372nd infantry regiment in France and trained with French officers. Later he transferred to the 370th Infantry Regiment and fought in the battle of Oise-Aisne the same year. He commanded the company when the captain became wounded. He was released in 1919 after returning from the 93rd Infantry Division

== Legal career ==
Wesley was inspired by W. E. B. Du Bois and various black leaders to join the NAACP and began his career in law. He began attending law school at Northwestern University in Evanston, Illinois, before World War I and became active in civil rights issues as an attorney. At one point, he suggested that the NAACP stop depending on white attorneys to work on cases in Texas.

Wesley worked with members of the NAACP, including Thurgood Marshall, to fight the state of Texas and the Texas Democratic Party in order to end the racially discriminatory white primary election. Texas claimed that it had no role in the primary because that was the exclusive domain of the state Democratic Party. Wesley and his law partner James Nabrit Jr. challenged this theory, but the Court upheld the white primary in Grovey v. Townsend, 295 U.S. 45, 55 S. Ct. 622, 792 L. Ed. 1292 (1932). Wesley did not give up the fight, and although it took until 1944, in Smith v. Allwright, 321 U.S. 649, 64 S. Ct. 757, 88 L. Ed. 987 (1944), the Court finally struck down the Texas white primary, finding that the discriminatory voting practice was unconstitutional.

Wesley was also an instrument in desegregating the University of Texas Law School, by providing support for Heman Sweatt, who was not admitted because he was black. Wesley even employed Sweatt at one of his newspapers while the suit was going through the courts.

== Newspaper and publishing career ==
Active in the civil rights movement as an attorney, Wesley eventually became interested in the power of the press, and switched his focus to the publishing industry. He took a job with the Houston Informer, a newspaper for African Americans, and became the editor of the paper in 1929. Wesley was then promoted to vice president of the newspaper company in 1930 and became manager by the end of 1932. He eventually took a controlling interest in the newspaper and help it grow to become, in 1945, the largest black-owned business in Houston.

Wesley was also the owner of the Dallas Express, one of the papers published by Freedman's Publishing Company. He was sent with 10 other black publishers to Germany to "investigate claims of discrimination against black servicemen in that country."
