= Communications Workers of America =

North American labor union

- Abbreviation: CWA
- Predecessor: National Federation of Telephone Workers
- Formation: 1947; 79 years ago
- Type: Trade union
- Headquarters: Washington, D.C., US
- Locations: United States; Canada (Note: The CWA also represents a few hundred members in England.)
- Members: 428,074 ("active" and "dues-paying retired" members); 254,250 ("non-dues-paying retired" members); (2025)
- President: Claude Cummings Jr.
- Secretary-treasurer: Ameenah Salaam
- Affiliations: AFL-CIO; Canadian Labour Congress; Strategic Organizing Center; UNI Global Union
- Website: cwa-union.org

The Communications Workers of America (CWA) is the largest communications and media labor union in the United States, representing about 700,000 members in both the private and public sectors (also in Canada and Puerto Rico). The union has 27 locals in Canada via CWA-SCA Canada (French: Syndicat des communications d'Amérique) representing about 8,000 members. CWA has several affiliated subsidiary labor unions bringing total membership to over 700,000. CWA is headquartered in Washington, DC, and affiliated with the AFL-CIO, the Strategic Organizing Center, the Canadian Labour Congress, and UNI Global Union.

== History ==
In 1918 telephone operators organized under the Telephone Operators Department of the International Brotherhood of Electrical Workers. While initially successful at organizing, the union was damaged by a 1923 strike and subsequent AT&T lockout. After AT&T installed company-controlled Employees' Committees, the Telephone Operators Department eventually disbanded. The CWA's roots lie in the 1938 reorganization of telephone workers into the National Federation of Telephone Workers after the Wagner Act outlawed such employees' committees or "company unions". NFTW was a federation of sovereign local independent unions that lacked authority over the affiliated local unions leaving it at a serious organizational disadvantage. After losing a strike with AT&T in 1947, the federation led by Joseph A. Beirne, reorganized as CWA, a truly national union, which affiliated with the Congress of Industrial Organizations in 1949. The union's Canadian members split away in 1972, forming the Communication Workers of Canada.

CWA has continued to expand into areas beyond traditional telephone service. In 1994 the National Association of Broadcast Employees and Technicians merged with the CWA and became The Broadcasting and Cable Television Workers Sector of the CWA, NABET-CWA. Since 1997, it includes The Newspaper Guild (now renamed The NewsGuild-CWA). In 2004, the Association of Flight Attendants merged with CWA, and became formally known as the Association of Flight Attendants-CWA, or AFA-CWA. In 2020 CWA launched the Campaign to Organize Digital Employees (CODE-CWA) initiative to unionize tech, video game, and digital workers which has led to CWA becoming a major union for US and Canada tech worker organizing, including the first video game workers union at Beast Breaker developer Vodeo Games and organizing all non-management workers at the Hawaii digital wireless carrier Mobi in 2022. In September 2026, over 200 workers at Wikimedia Foundation joined the CWA under Wiki Workers United.

=== Contracts and strikes ===
Following is a partial list of contracts and strikes that the Communications Workers of America were involved in:

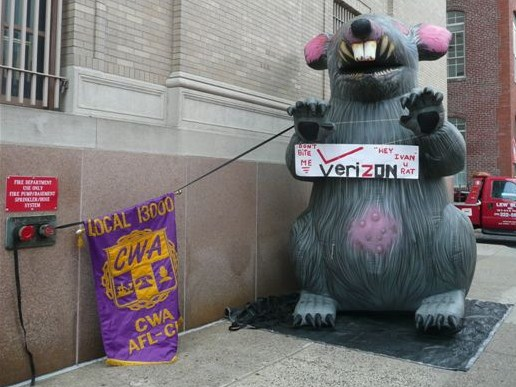
An inflatable rat used by the CWA during a 2009 rally against Verizon

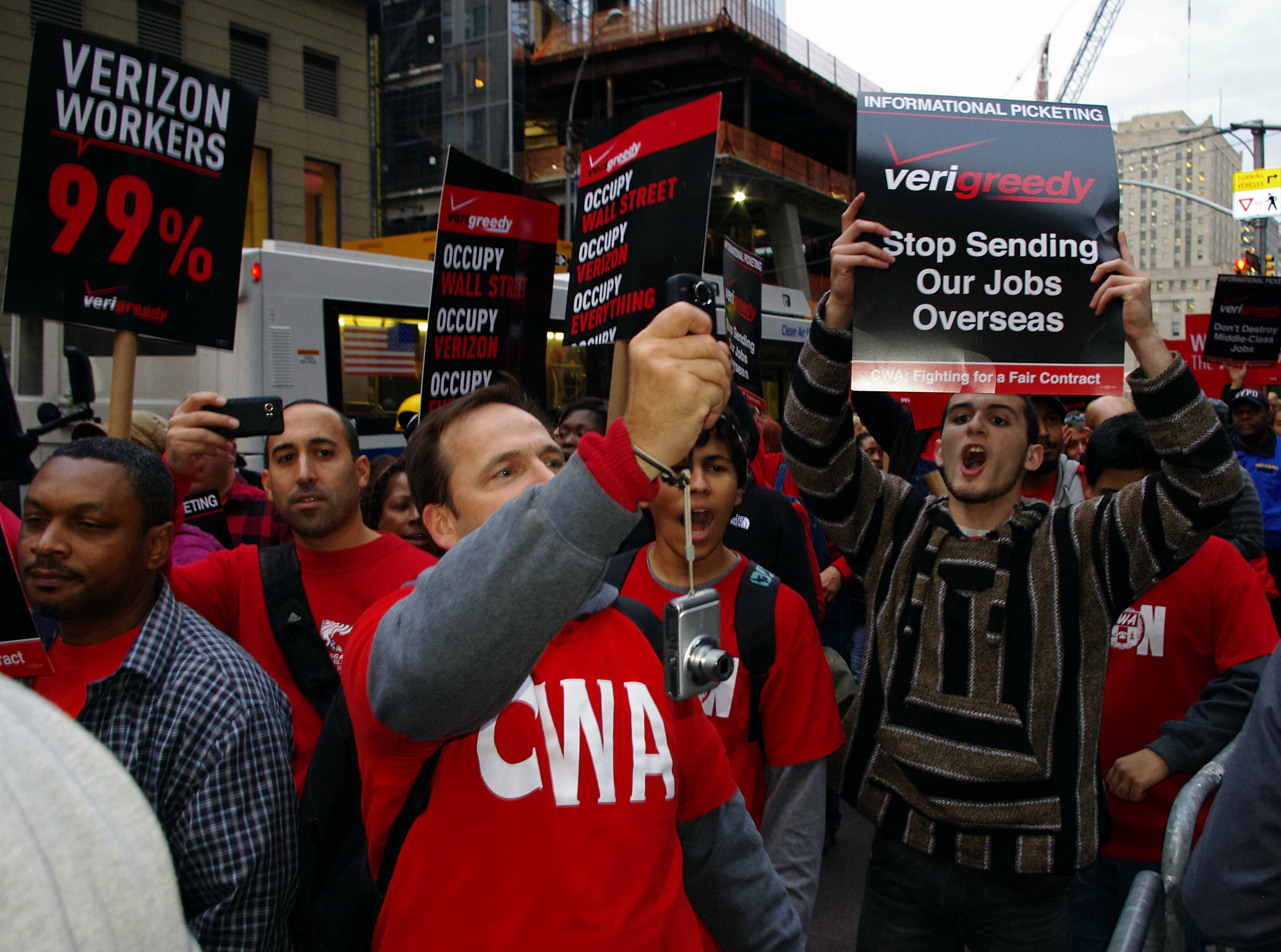
Verizon members protesting at Occupy Wall Street in October 2011

Year	Company	Number of Members Affected	Duration of Strike	Notes
1955	Southern Bell Telephone Co.	50,000	72 days	Strike was in answer to management's effort to prohibit workers from striking. An expensive strike due to significant number of illegal firings and civil suits from Southern Bell. Out of 200 fired strikers, 150 were reinstated following legal action, with over $200,000 in back pay awarded. AT&T was forced to acknowledge the union.
1983	Bell System	600,000	22 days	1983 AT&T strike: Last contract with the Bell System before its breakup. Bell System sought givebacks. The contract resulted in Wage increases, employment security, pension, and health improvements.
1998	US West	34,000	15 days	Strike was due to mandatory overtime demands and forced pay-for-performance plan. Overtime caps were won.
2012	AT&T	20,000	2 days	AT&T West; California, Nevada, and AT&T East; Connecticut - Unfair labor practice strike during contract negotiations.
2016	Verizon	40,000	49 days	Verizon strike of 2016: Issues include healthcare and pension costs, moving call center jobs overseas and temporary job relocations.

== Composition ==
=== Membership ===
Total membership (US records)
View source data.
Finances (US records; ×$1000)
View source data.

According to CWA's Department of Labor records since 2006, when membership classifications were first reported, the total reported membership has varied greatly and unpredictably due to the addition and removal of reported membership categories. As of 2025, there are 682,324 members, of which 254,250 (37%) are classified as "non-dues-paying retirees", and not eligible to vote in the union. The other, voting eligible, classifications are "active" (367,026 members; 54%) and "dues-paying retired" (61,048 members; 9%). CWA contracts also cover 14,238 non-members, known as agency fee payers, which number comparatively about 2% of the size of the union's membership.

=== Affiliates ===
- Association of Flight Attendants (AFA-CWA) represents over 55,000 flight attendants at 22 airlines. Established in 1945, it affiliated with the CWA in 2004.
- CODE-CWA (Campaign to Organize Digital Employees)
- International Union of Electronic, Electrical, Salaried, Machine and Furniture Workers (IUE-CWA) represents over 45,000 manufacturing and industrial workers and affiliated with CWA in 2000.
- The NewsGuild (TNG-CWA) represents over 26,000 journalists and media workers at wire services, newspapers, magazines, and broadcast news. Established in 1933, it affiliated with the CWA in 1995.
- National Association of Broadcast Employees and Technicians (NABET-CWA) represents over 10,000 workers employed in the broadcasting, distributing, telecasting, recording, cable, video, sound recording and related industries. Established in 1934, it affiliated with the CWA in 1994.
- CWA Public, Healthcare and Education Workers represents more than 140,000 workers including social workers, educators, and health care providers, including state workers across New Jersey.
- Printing, Publishing and Media Workers Sector (PPMWS-CWA) was formed from the merger of the International Typographical Union printers. PPMWS-CWA represents over 8,000 workers in a diverse range of occupations in daily newspapers, commercial printing and mailing operations, and graphic design.
- University Professional and Technical Employees (UPTE-CWA) represents 18,000 clinical lab technicians, computer resource specialists, editors, lab assistants, museum scientists, social workers, staff research associates, student affairs officers, and writers at all campuses and medical centers of the University of California. Established in 1990, it affiliated with the CWA in 1993.
- Wells Fargo Workers United (WFWU-CWA) formed in 2023 with its first win in an Albuquerque, New Mexico branch office. Since this first win, the division has successfully organized 20 local branch offices across the country.
- USL Players Association (USPA-CWA Local 7211) represents over 900 soccer professional players of USL Championship, USL Super League, USL League One, and the proposed USL Premier.
- United Videogame Workers-CWA (UVW-CWA) was launched in March 2025 to cover all workers involved in the video game industry across United States and Canada.
- ZeniMax United (ZOS United-CWA), represents 461 workers of ZeniMax Online Studios and 241 workers of subsidiary studio Bethesda Studios

== Leadership ==
=== Presidents ===
1947: Joseph A. Beirne
1974: Glenn Watts
1985: Morton Bahr
2005: Larry Cohen
2015: Chris Shelton
2023: Claude Cummings Jr.

== General References ==
- Communications Workers of America Operators Division Local 1104 Records, 1949-2001 (bulk 1980-1995). M.E. Grenander Department of Special Collections and Archives, University Libraries, University at Albany, State University of New York (hereafter referred to as the CWA Operators Division Local 1104 Records).
