= William H. Young (labor leader) =

American labor union leader (born 1946)

William H. Young (born August 16, 1946) is an American labor union leader. He was president of the National Association of Letter Carriers (NALC) from 2002 to 2009 and also a vice-president of the AFL–CIO.

== Biography ==
Young was born and raised in San Luis Obispo, California and joined the United States Postal Service in 1965 shortly after graduating from high school. After serving for two years in the US Army, he returned to the postal service and was elected a shop steward of NALC Branch 1115 (later incorporated into Central California Coast Branch 52) and became its president in 1971. In the succeeding years he rose through the union hierarchy first at state, then at national level. He was elected national vice president of the union in 1994 and national executive vice president in 1998. On October 28, 2002, he was elected the 17th president of the NALC (succeeding Vincent R. Sombrotto) after a rank-and-file ballot in which Young received 79% of the votes and took up his post in December of that year. At the union's national convention in 2006, he was re-elected president by acclamation and served in that post until his retirement in 2009.

During Young's tenure as president of the NALC, the union developed new grievance procedures, negotiated a five-year contract with the US Postal Service providing for regular wage increases and cost-of-living adjustments which the membership ratified by a margin of 9 to 1, and increased its participation in politics. A Leadership Academy was also established to train future leaders of the union. Young appeared several times at United States congressional hearings including those on the overhaul of the US Postal Service in February 2004, the contracting out of letter carrier jobs in April 2007, and the implementation of the Postal Accountability and Enhancement Act in July 2007. At the time of his retirement from the presidency of the NALC, Young served on the AFL–CIO Executive Council as well as on its executive committee and political committee. He was also vice chair of the AFL–CIO Executive Council's Community Partnerships Committee, a national vice president of the Muscular Dystrophy Association, and a member of the Advisory Board for the Walter P. Reuther Library of Labor and Urban Affairs at Wayne State University.

Young resides in Maryland with his wife, Deborah. The couple have four children.

== See also ==
- National Rural Letter Carriers' Association
- National Postal Mail Handlers Union
- American Postal Workers Union

Trade union offices
Preceded by Vincent Sombrotto	President of the National Association of Letter Carriers; 2002–2009	Succeeded by Fredric V. Rolando
