= Simon Green Atkins =

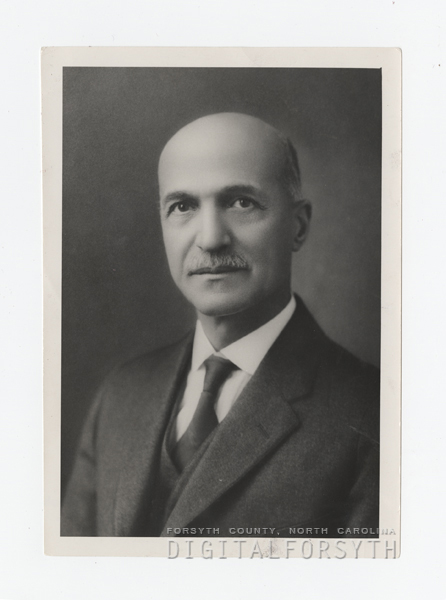
- Born: June 11, 1863; Haywood, Chatham County, North Carolina
- Died: June 28, 1934 (aged 71); Winston-Salem, North Carolina
- Education: St. Augustine's Normal Collegiate Institute (now St. Augustine's College) (attended 1880-1884)
- Occupations: Grammar school department head. Livingstone College in Salisbury, NC (1884–1890); President of Slater Industrial Academy, 1892–1904 and 1913–1934
- Known for: Founded of the North Carolina Negro Teachers' Association, 1881; founded Winston Salem State University (previously Slater Industrial Academy), 1892
- Spouse: Oleona Pegram Atkins (married 1889-death)
- Children: Jasper, Francis, Olie, Clarence, Russell, Miriam, Harvey, Eliza, Leland

Simon Green Atkins (June 11, 1863 – June 28, 1934) was a North Carolina educator who was the founder and first president of Winston-Salem State University (previously the Slater Industrial Academy) and founded the North Carolina Negro Teachers' Association in 1881. He dedicated his life to improving education for African Americans and his prowess in teaching allowed him to make great strides in providing better and equal education. In addition to teaching, Atkins worked to better his community by improving the health, housing, and economic status of the African American community.

== Early life ==
Born to two former slaves, Atkins was born into slavery on a farm in North Carolina rented by his former owner, Capt. E. Bryan. In 1880, after many years of public education, Atkins enrolled at St. Augustine's Normal and Collegiate Institute in Raleigh, North Carolina. Here, he was introduced to Anna Julia Cooper, an accomplished student at St. Augustine's college, who mentored Atkins and inspired him to continue pursuing education. With Cooper's help, at the young age of 17, Atkins began his teaching career at a rural public school in North Carolina.

== Education ==
Atkins first began his education from his earliest years of attending schooling in Haywood, NC, where he progressed to top of his class. After teaching at a local school, he then enrolled at St. Augustine's College Raleigh, NC in 1880.

== Career ==
Atkins' career began in 1880, when he began teaching at a rural school in North Carolina. After graduating from St. Augustine's College, Atkins was offered a teaching position in his hometown of Chatham County. There, his dedication to his work was recognized by Dr. J. C. Price, and in 1884, Price brought him to Livingstone College in Salisbury and offered him the job of head of the grammar school. Atkins served as the head of the grammar department for six years and during the last two years of his time there, worked as the treasurer of the college. While serving as principal at Depot Street Public School in Winston-Salem, NC, which was the largest public grammar school for African-Americans in NC, Atkins began his work to improve living conditions for African Americans. In 1892, he and his wife, Oleona, were the first settlers in the Columbian Heights neighborhood, where Atkins would establish a community that would serve as a "center of mutual understanding, respect, and regard of one race for the other." The new area proved to be a suitable environment for a new school. In 1892, in Columbian Heights, Atkins founded the Slater Industrial Academy, now Winston-Salem State University, where he served as president for over 30 years (1892-1904 and 1913–1934).

== Legacy ==
In 2011, Winston-Salem State University established the Simon Green Atkins Society to honor those that make significant contributions ($1,000 or more) to the university. This money supports the university's most important priorities. In addition to the Simon Green Atkins Society, WSSU also implemented the Simon Green Atkins Scholars Society, an undergraduate program of both curricular and co-curricular aspects as well as many experimental learning initiatives. The goal of the program is to provide "personal attention, top faculty, enlightening seminars, illuminating study-abroad experiences, numerous research opportunities, and career-building internships," in order to enhance education experience and prepare students for their future.

A house Atkins built in Winston-Salem in 1893, now known as the S. G. Atkins House, was listed on the National Register of Historic Places in 1979.

Simon G. Atkins Academic & Technology High School, a magnet high school in Winston-Salem, North Carolina, is named for Atkins.
