= National Association of Letter Carriers =

U.S. labor union

NALC
- National Association of Letter Carriers
- Founded: 1889
- Headquarters: Washington, D.C.
- Location: United States
- Members: 277,000
- Key people: Brian Renfroe (President)
- Affiliations: AFL-CIO, UNI
- Website: www.nalc.org

The National Association of Letter Carriers (NALC) is an American labor union, representing non-rural letter carriers employed by the United States Postal Service. It was founded in 1889. The NALC has 2,500 local branches representing letter carriers in all 50 states, the District of Columbia, Puerto Rico, the Virgin Islands and Guam.

== History ==
Letter carriers were the first postal workers to form their own union. They had tried to organize a national union at least three times—in 1870 in Washington, D.C., in 1877 in New York City, and in 1880 again in New York City.

Recognizing that these earlier attempts had failed in part due to the expense of regularly convening enough carriers to sustain a national organization, in 1889 the Milwaukee Letter Carriers Association decided to time their call for another national meeting of carriers to coincide with the annual reunion of the Grand Army of the Republic—an organization of Union Army veterans—so that letter carriers who were veterans could take advantage of reduced train fares.

On August 29, 1889, delegates moved quickly, unanimously adopting a resolution to form a National Association of Letter Carriers. On the next day, August 30, 1889, they elected William Wood of Detroit as the first president and appointed an executive board to coordinate all legislative efforts.

NALC had 52 locals, called branches, with 4,600 members in 1890, and 335 branches by 1892.

In the beginning, the union focused on forcing postmasters to honor federal law mandating an eight-hour day for federal employees. In 1893, the NALC won a Supreme Court decision—United States v. Post—and $3.5 million back in overtime pay.

Local postmasters vigorously opposed the union, even though it did not sponsor strikes.

NALC joined the American Federation of Labor (AFL) in 1917. In 1946, the small National Federation of Rural Letter Carriers merged in.

In the early 1940s, Mario Biaggi, a future highly decorated policeman and US Congressman, became active in New York's Branch 36.

By the mid-1960s, NALC had 175,000 members in 6,400 local branches.

The history of the National Association of Letter Carriers is documented through archival collections at the Walter P. Reuther Library in Detroit, Michigan.

=== 1970 strike ===
Letter carrier morale plummeted during the mid-1960s as inflation eroded carriers' salaries. A growing sense of militancy developed as carriers and their families in big cities neared the poverty level.

In New York City's Branch 36, a storm of protest erupted when President Richard Nixon provided only a 4.1 percent pay raise in 1969, a figure the NALC deemed unacceptable. Events escalated as the Christmas mail rush neared and Nixon called NALC President James Rademacher to the White House to forge a compromise that tied a pay raise in 1970 to the concept of an independent postal authority to bargain with postal unions.

The Nixon-Rademacher agreement incensed letter carriers and when a House committee the following March approved a bill reflecting the Nixon-Rademacher compromise, calls for a strike were shouted in New York's Branch 36 and other branches.

Despite being barred from participating in a strike, on March 17, 1970, the votes were counted in Branch 36, and a long-threatened strike was approved, 1,555 to 1,055. At 12:01 a.m. on March 18, picket lines created by Branch 36 went up at post offices throughout Manhattan and the Bronx in New York City as letter carriers went on strike. Within two days, more than 200,000 letter carriers and other postal employees across the country had joined the walkout.

Nixon called out 25,000 soldiers to move the mail in New York City. The strike ended after eight days when local NALC leaders assured strikers that an agreement had been reached, even though their word was premature. Round-the-clock negotiations began and on April 2 a satisfactory agreement was reached, which was quickly approved by Congress.

The NALC Office of the President: James H. Rademacher Records contain archival material related to the strike.

The militancy that came out of New York's Branch 36 during the strike changed forever the nature of the NALC.

In 1971, a nationwide rank-and-file movement led by Vincent Sombrotto of Branch 36 was formed with goals of giving members the right to vote directly for national union officers and ending a proxy system that had prevented non-incumbents from breaking into the union's power structure.

Sombrotto was elected national president in 1978, ousting incumbent president J. Joseph Vacca. He moved quickly to enhance the union's lobbying power with Congress and the Executive Branch, as well as the NALC's stature within the trade union movement.

== Membership and politics ==
Like most other unions in the United States, the NALC, and most of its rank and file, is involved politically and has largely supported the Democratic Party, although has been critical of Democrats on occasion, such as President Lyndon B. Johnson when he vetoed a postal pay raise in the mid-1960s. The union has also supported a number of individual Republican candidates.

Prior to the Postal Reorganization Act of 1970, the United States Postal Service was a federal executive department under the name Post Office Department, and the Postmaster General was member of the Cabinet. The rate of postal pay was set by the Congress by federal law, meaning that the Postal Service and its employees were deeply affected by Congress. The NALC strongly supported the Postal Reorganization Act.

NALC's expertise has traditionally been in lobbying rather than in traditional labor-management relations and collective bargaining. Like all federal agencies under the Taft–Hartley Act, the Postal Service is an "open shop," and no one can be compelled to join the NALC or any other union as a condition of gaining or continuing employment with the government. Other federal laws prohibit letter carriers, like other public employees, from striking. Nonetheless, over 93 percent of all working letter carriers are members of the NALC and the union is now recognized as the collective bargaining agent for all city carriers.

The NALC distinguishes itself from other unions in several ways. For example, membership is completely voluntary; NALC states that its membership includes 277,000 active and retired members, including approximately 180,000 active city delivery letter carriers employed by the U.S. Postal Service, either as full-time letter carriers or part-time carriers known as "city carrier assistants". NALC also refers to its chapters as "branches" rather than "locals".

NALC developed its own retirement community for its members in Nalcrest, Florida. It also operates a mutual benefit association which sells life insurance to members and has its own health benefit plan—the NALC Health Benefit Plan—which predates the Federal Employees Health Benefit Plan, in which letter carriers (as federal employees) also participate.

== Issues ==
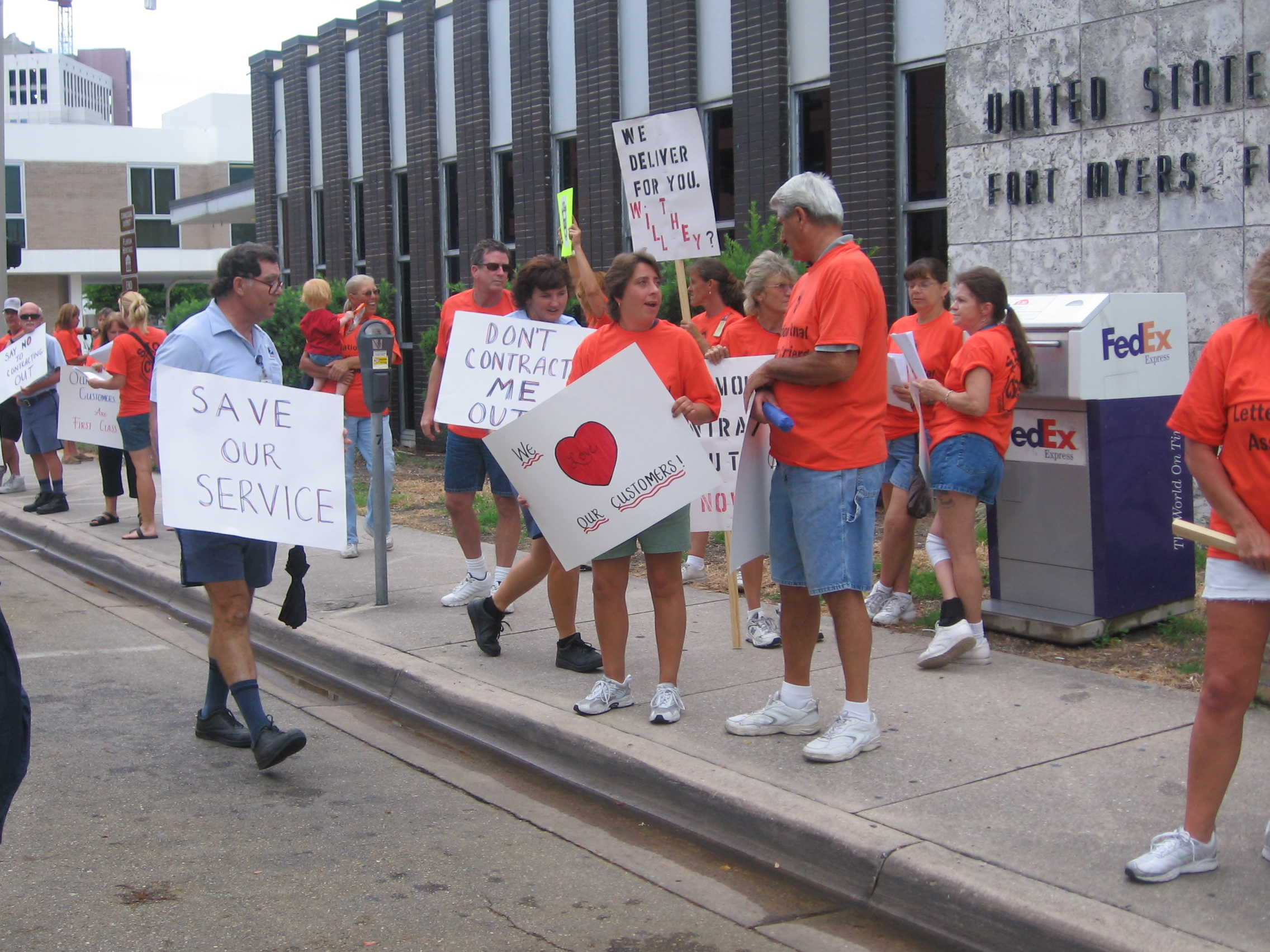
City and rural carriers offer their opinions of CDS outside the Downtown Fort Myers post office on June 27, 2007

Over the years, the NALC has worked to negotiate the wages and working conditions of city letter carriers. Some of the negotiated issues are the maximum weight of an item that an employee may be required to lift, the maximum weight that an employee can be required to carry in his or her satchel, safe delivery methods, and the letter carrier uniform.

The NALC is opposed to postal privatization and to any termination of the USPS postal monopoly on first-class mail, as well as to contract delivery service (CDS), the contracting out of postal work to non-USPS independent contractor employees (see Star routes), who have lower wages (and fewer benefits or none at all) than USPS employees.

== Charitable and philanthropic activities ==
=== Muscular Dystrophy Association ===
The union has a close relationship with the Muscular Dystrophy Association. The NALC was the first national sponsor of MDA and letter carriers are among the charity's top fund-raisers.

=== Letter carriers' Stamp Out Hunger Food Drive ===
Each year on the second Saturday in May, as they deliver the mail, letter carriers collect non-perishable food donations left by the mailboxes on their route from postal customers participating in the NALC Stamp Out Hunger Food Drive. It is considered the largest one-day food collection effort in the United States. Participation is strictly voluntary.

The national, coordinated effort by the NALC grew out of discussions in 1991 by a number of leaders at the time, including NALC President Vincent Sombrotto, AFL–CIO Community Services Director Joseph Velasquez and USPS Postmaster General Anthony Frank. A pilot drive was held in 10 cities in October 1991, and it proved so successful that work began immediately on making it a nationwide effort.

Input from food banks and pantries suggested that late spring would be the best time since by then most food banks in the country start running out of donations received during the Thanksgiving and Christmas holiday periods.

In 2014, the drive gathered 72.5 million pounds of food, the 11th consecutive year the drive surpassed 70 million pounds. That year's results brought the total to more than 1.3 billion pounds since the national drive began in 1992.

The Stamp Out Hunger Food Drive has also received two Presidential Certificates of Achievement.

=== National Heroes of the Year ===
Each fall, the NALC holds a awards ceremony, highlighting acts performed NALC letter carriers and branches above and beyond their duties of carrying the mail.

The 2014 National Heroes of the Year awards ceremony recognized letter several letter carriers—a National Hero; a Humanitarian of the Year; heroes from the eastern, central and western regions of the United States—as well as one branch and one post office—as national heroes of the year.

== Political action ==
Working to elect members of Congress who support NALC priorities is a primary objective of the union's political affairs operation. The NALC's political action fund (or PAC) is called the Committee on Letter Carrier Political Education (abbreviated as COLCPE).

COLCPE's stated goal is to help "pro-labor, pro-letter carriers candidates get elected so they can go to Washington to support and protect letter carrier jobs." Contributing to the PAC is strictly voluntary, as federal law forbids unions from using dues money for political purposes.

In 2016, COLCPE was rebranded as the Letter Carrier Political Fund.

=== Hatch Act ===
Until 1993, active letter carriers were barred from taking any significant volunteer role for any political campaigns. The primary sentiment behind the law was to protect federal employees from being strong-armed and intimidated into helping their bosses run for reelection.

In 1993, Congress amended the Hatch Act of 1939 to allow federal employees to take an active part in political campaigns for federal offices. While there are still some restrictions on what federal employees (including active letter carriers) can do, there is more latitude for letter carrier political participation in campaigns for president, the Senate and the House of Representatives, as well as state and local elected officials.

Retired letter carriers, as well as letter carrier spouses and family members, are not bound by the Hatch Act.

== Presidents ==
NALC Presidents
NALC President	Start year	End year
William H. Wood	1889	1890
John J. Goodwin	1890	1891
Theodore C. Dennis	1891	1892
Frank E. Smith	1892	1893
C.C. Couden	1894	
R.F. Quinn	1895	
John N. Parsons	1896	1900
James C. Keller	1901	1905
Jeremiah D. Holland	1905	1907
William E. Kelly	1907	1914
Edward J. Gainor	1914	1941
William C. Doherty	1941	1962
Jerome J. Keating	1962	1968
James H. Rademacher	1968	1977
J. Joseph Vacca	1977	1978
Vincent Sombrotto	1979	2002
William H. Young	2002	2009
Fredric V. Rolando	2009	2022
Brian Renfroe	2022	Present

== See also ==
- AFL–CIO
- National Rural Letter Carriers' Association
- National Postal Mail Handlers Union
- National Alliance of Postal and Federal Employees
- American Postal Workers Union
