= National Alliance of Postal and Federal Employees =

Labor union in the United States

APFFF
- National Alliance Of Postal and Federal Employees
- Founded: October 6, 1913; 112 years ago
- Headquarters: Washington, D.C.
- Location: United States
- Members: 6,700
- Key people: David A. Cage, president
- Affiliations: ITUC
- Website: www.napfe.com

The National Alliance Of Postal and Federal Employees (NAPFE) is a labor union in the United States.

The union was founded on October 6, 1913 in Chattanooga, Tennessee. It initially represented African-American workers for the railway mail service. From 1923, it admitted all African-Americans in the United States Postal Service, and became the National Alliance of Postal Employees. By 1925, it had 1,700 members.

Over time, the union began representing some government workers outside the postal service, and so adopted its current name. By 1968, it had grown to 32,000 members, most of whom were African-American.

The union is affiliated with the International Trade Union Confederation.
