= John E. Potter =

72nd United States Postmaster General (born 1956)

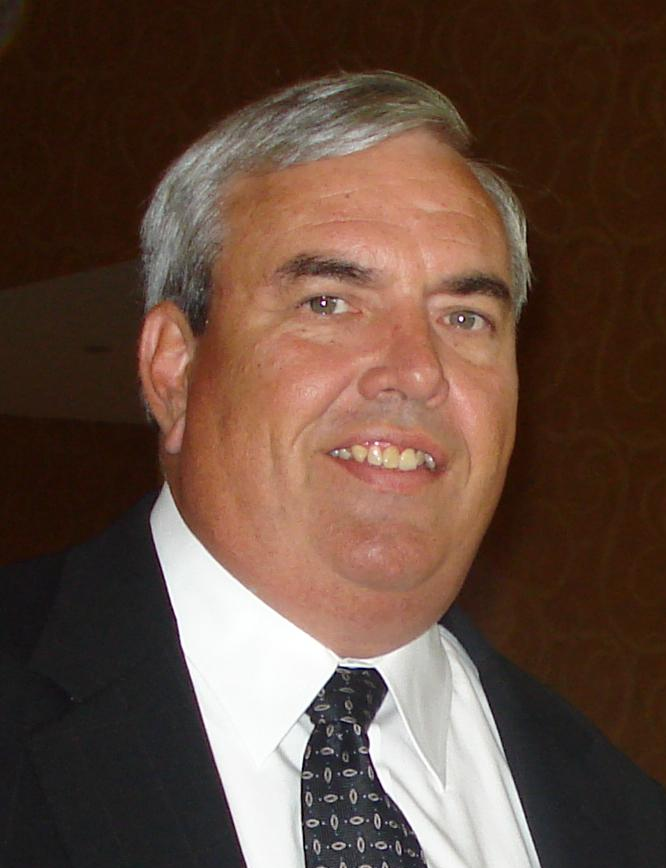
- Potter in 2009

President and Chief Executive Officer of the Metropolitan Washington Airports Authority
- Incumbent
- Assumed office July 18, 2011
- Preceded by: Lynn Hampton

72nd United States Postmaster General
- In office June 1, 2001 – December 6, 2010
- President: George W. Bush; Barack Obama
- Preceded by: William J. Henderson
- Succeeded by: Patrick R. Donahoe

Personal details
- Born: 1956 (age 69–70) New York City, U.S.
- Party: Republican
- Education: Fordham University (BA); Massachusetts Institute of Technology (MBA)

John E. "Jack" Potter (born 1956) is the president and CEO of the Metropolitan Washington Airports Authority since July 18, 2011. He is the former United States Postmaster General and CEO of the United States Postal Service (USPS), having become the 72nd postmaster general on June 1, 2001. Potter is the second longest-serving postmaster general, following Gideon Granger.

== Early postal career ==
Potter's father, Richard, was a Manhattan letter carrier who later became a senior executive of the postal service. After graduating from Cardinal Spellman High School in the Bronx a year behind Supreme Court Justice Sonia Sotomayor, Potter attended Fordham University. He joined the postal service in 1978 as a distribution clerk in Westchester keying ZIP codes into sorting machines. After eight years in New York, including a three-year analyst's stint at 50th Street and Broadway, Potter rose rapidly through the hierarchy, establishing himself as an automation expert.

== Anthrax Attacks ==
Potter and two other top officials were accused of knowingly putting workers' lives in danger during the 2001 Anthrax Attacks when letters containing anthrax spores were mailed through USPS. Laced letters targeting members of the Senate were processed at the Brentwood Post Office in Washington, D.C., where two postal workers died of anthrax inhalation and which had to be closed for decontamination.

== USPS Transformation Plan ==
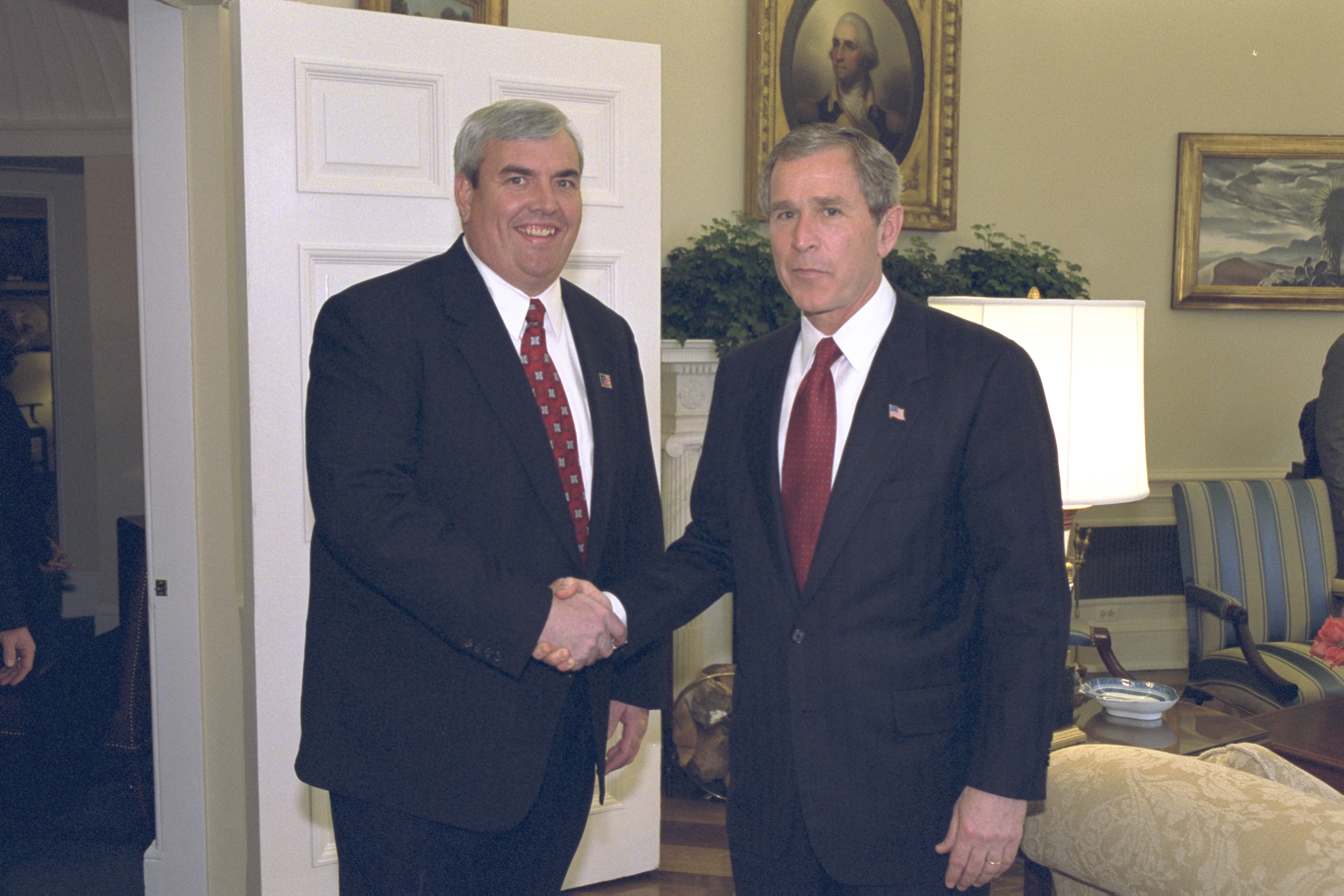
Potter with President George W. Bush in 2002

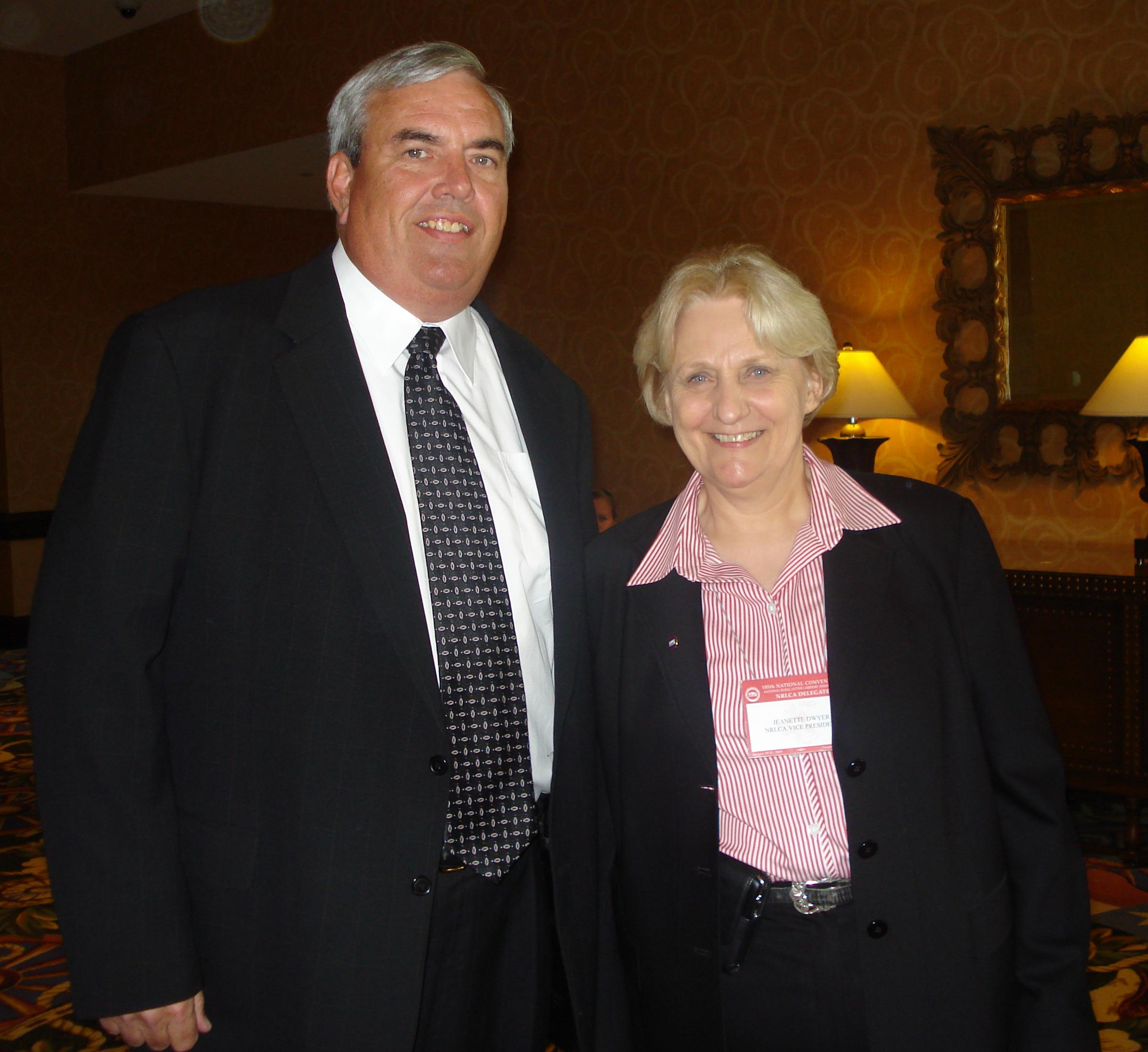
Jack Potter & NRLCA Vice President Jeanette Dwyer

In April 2002, Potter submitted the USPS Transformation Plan to Congress in response to the many challenges the Postal Service faced, such as new uses of technology. These challenges threatened the financial and commercial viability of the Postal Service. The Transformation Plan laid out short- and long-term options for change and was partial basis for the landmark Postal Reform And Accountability Act (H.R. 6407) in late 2006—the first postal reform since the Postal Reorganization Act of 1970.

== Six-day delivery ==
On January 28, 2009, Potter testified before the Senate that if the Postal Service is not able to readjust their payment toward the pre-funding of retiree health benefits, as mandated by the Postal Accountability and Enhancement Act of 2006, the USPS would be forced to consider cutting delivery to five days per week during the summer months of June, July, and August.

H.R. 22, addressing this issue, passed the House of Representatives and Senate and was signed into law on September 30, 2009. However, PMG Potter has unveiled a plan to eliminate Saturday mail delivery. The universal service obligation and six day delivery are upheld by Congressional language within Appropriations legislation, so a reduction in service would require action from the House and Senate.

Chairman José Serrano (D-NY), of the House Appropriations subcommittee on Financial Services and General Government (which oversees language mandating six day service), said "While I understand the seriousness of the Postal Service's fiscal issues, I remain supportive of a six-day delivery schedule. I will be in conversations in coming weeks with the senior postal leadership and the postal unions in an effort to avoid service cuts."

On April 15, 2010, the House Committee on Oversight and Government Reform held a hearing to examine the status of the Postal Service and recent reports on short- and long-term strategies for the financial viability and stability of the USPS entitled "Continuing to Deliver: An Examination of the Postal Service's Current Financial Crisis and its Future Viability". At which, PMG Potter testified that by the year 2020, the USPS cumulative losses could exceed $238 billion, and that mail volume could drop 15% from 2009.

== Retirement ==
On September 30, the Postal Regulatory Commission unanimously voted to deny Potter's rate hike proposal that would force rates for periodicals mailers up eight percent and raise First-Class mail stamps to 46 cents.

On October 26, 2010, Potter announced his retirement to the Postal Service Board of Governors, which oversees the post office, effective December 3, 2010. Potter's deputy, Patrick R. Donahoe, succeeded him as head of the Postal Service. Donahoe echoed his predecessor's views on five-day delivery when he assumed office in December 2010.

On February 6, 2013, Donahoe announced that the Postal Service would implement five-day mail delivery beginning August 5, a move he claimed would save $2 billion annually. Later the same day, the national board of the National Rural Letter Carriers' Association voted unanimously to call for his dismissal. July 16, the House passed the Financial Services and General Government Appropriations bill, which included language protecting six‐day mail delivery, thereby blocking Donahoe's plan.

== President & CEO of the Metropolitan Washington Airports Authority ==
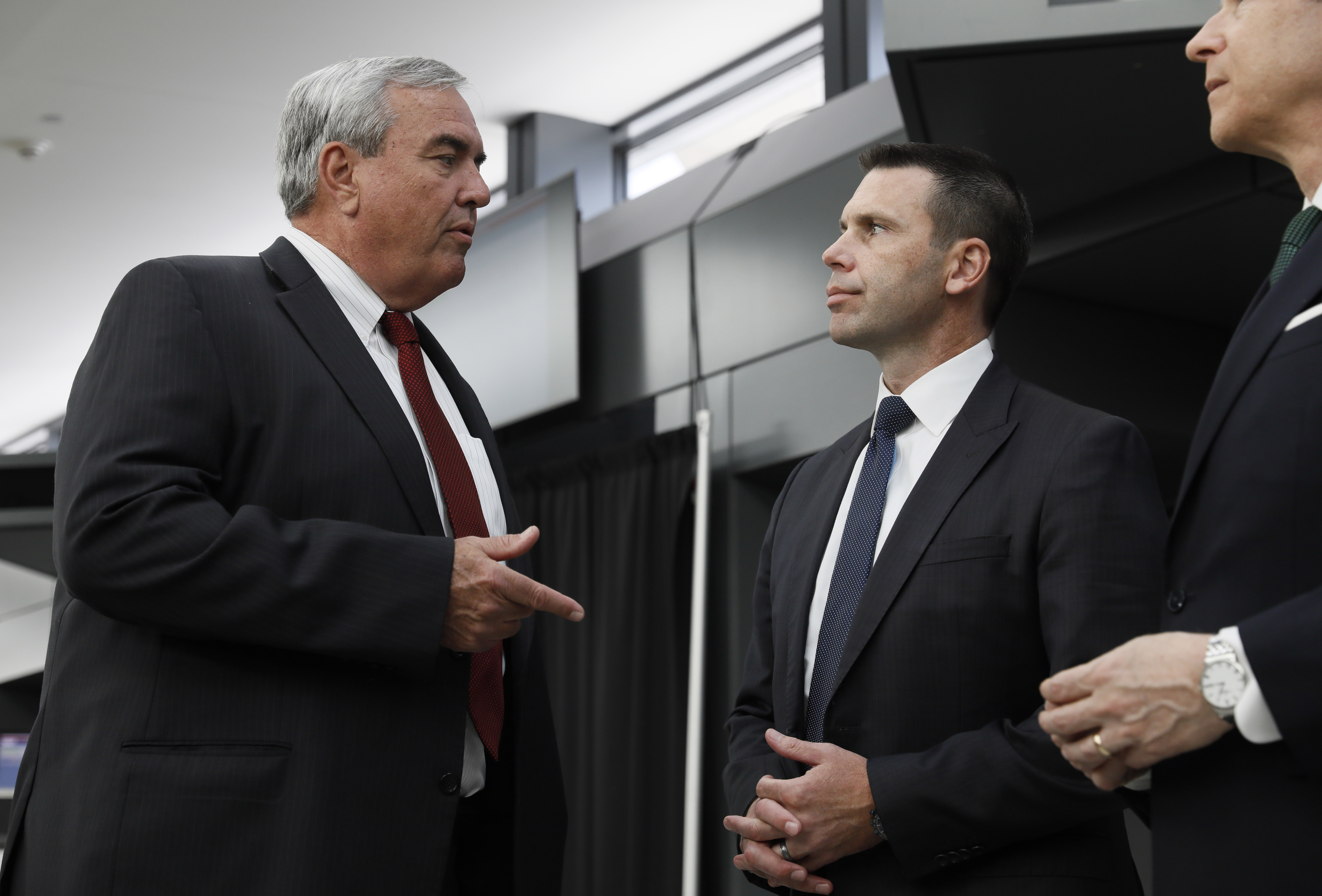
Potter (left) with Customs and Border Protection Commissioner Kevin McAleenan in 2018

On June 22, 2011, the board of directors of the Metropolitan Washington Airports Authority selected Potter to be the president and CEO of the Airports Authority. He joined the Authority on July 18, 2011.

== See also ==
- American Postal Workers Union
- National Association of Letter Carriers
- National Postal Mail Handlers Union

Government offices
Preceded by William J. Henderson	United States Postmaster General; June 1, 2001 – December 6, 2010	Succeeded by Patrick R. Donahoe
