= National Rural Letter Carriers' Association =

American labor union

- Founded: 1903
- Headquarters: Alexandria, Virginia
- Location: United States
- Members: 115,104 (2019)
- Key people: Patrick A. Pitts, President Kirby Ricketts, Vice President; Thomas K. Turner, Secretary-Treasurer; John C. Adams, Director of Labor Relations; Michael Merola, Director of Steward Operations; Justin Edens, Executive Committee Chair Executive Committee: Connie O'Brien, Natasha Patterson & Bethany Small
- Website: www.nrlca.org
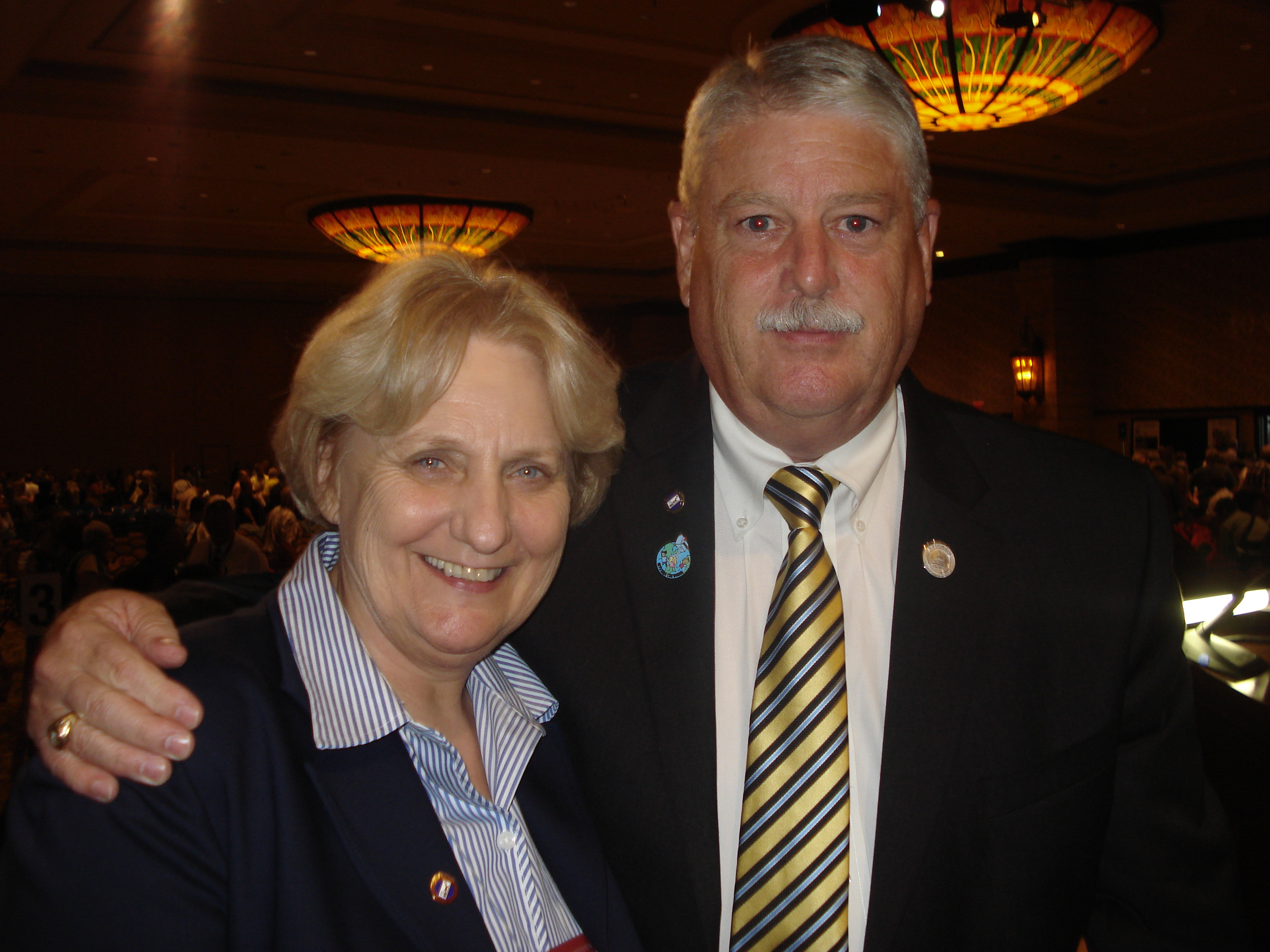
- Don Cantriel & his successor, Jeanette Dwyer

The National Rural Letter Carriers' Association (NRLCA) is an American labor union that represents the rural letter carriers of the United States Postal Service (USPS). The NRLCA negotiates all labor agreements for the rural carrier craft with the USPS, including salaries, and represents members of the rural carrier craft in the grievance procedure. The NRLCA's stated goal is to "improve the methods used by rural letter carriers, to benefit their conditions of labor with the United States Postal Service, and to promote a fraternal spirit among its members".

== Membership ==
To join the NRLCA, one must be employed by the USPS in the rural carrier craft as a rural carrier associate (RCA), substitute rural carrier, rural carrier relief (RCR), part-time flexible (PTF), assistant rural carrier (ARC) or regular carrier (designation code 71). The NRLCA provides information and fellowship for its members at county, district, state and national meetings where all members may participate in a democratic process of developing Association policy. The NRLCA provides a monthly publication, The National Rural Letter Carrier, to keep its members informed on postal and legislative matters of interest.

== History ==
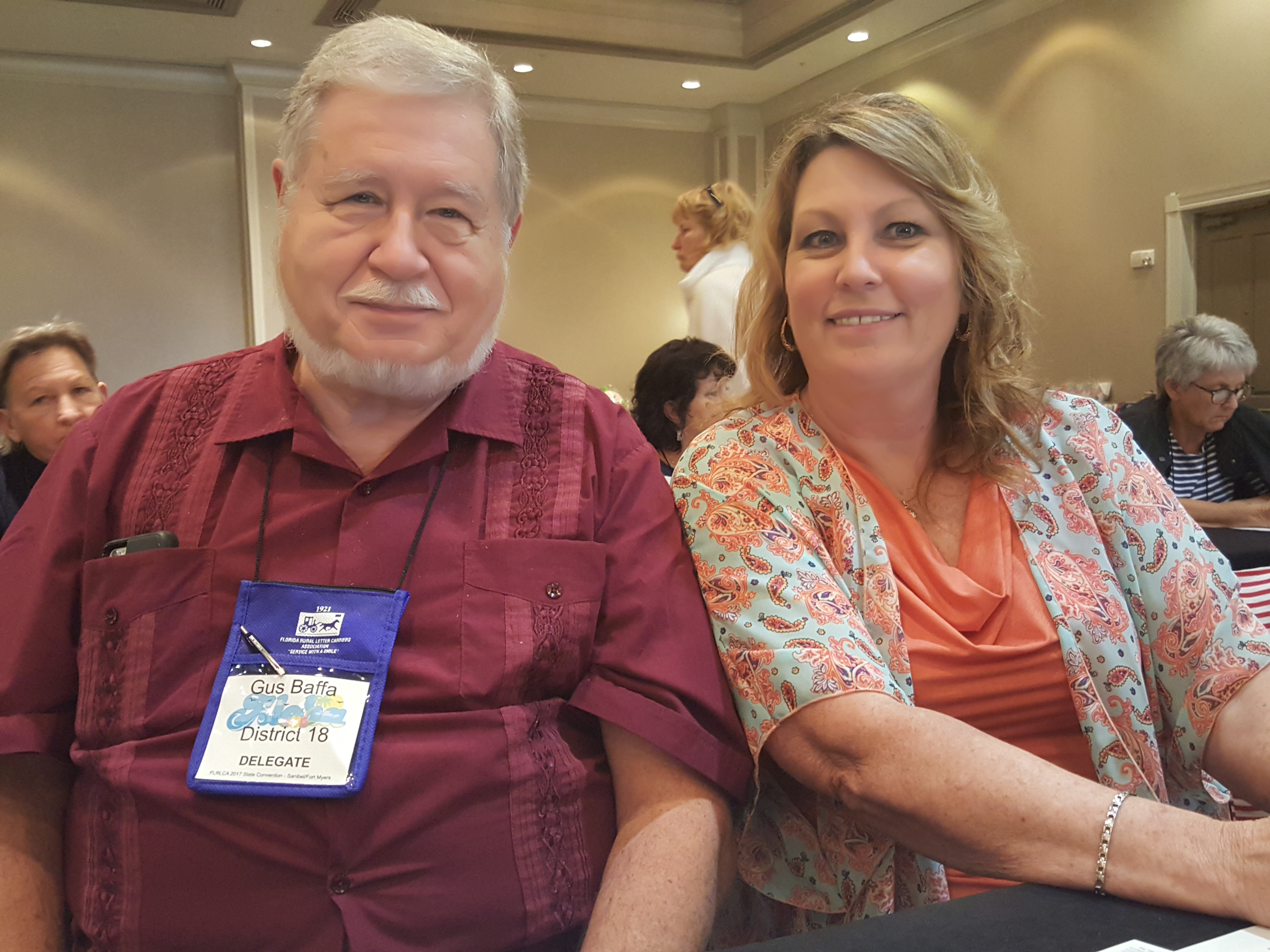
Gus & Shirley Baffa. Gus was President of the NRLCA from 2001 to 2003, and served as National PAC Chairman until his death in 2022. Shirley was on the national board, and served as Director of Steward Operations until 2024.

Free mail delivery began in American cities in 1863 with a limited scope. Shortly afterwards, rural citizens began petitioning for equal consideration. Postmaster General John Wanamaker first suggested rural free delivery (RFD) of mail in the United States in his annual report for fiscal year 1891. It began in 1896 with five routes, and the first rural carriers were paid $300 per year for their services. Seven years later, it had expanded to 15,119 routes covering 322,618 miles, however, inadequate pay was still an issue. The NRLCA was formed in 1903 at a cost of fifty cents per year in dues to its members.

In 1906, rural carriers were granted six national holidays. Christmas was not one of them, and did not become a holiday for rural carriers until 1923. In 1924, a special association committee traveled to Washington, D.C. to lobby for an equipment maintenance allowance (EMA). The following year, it became law. In 1928, the NRLCA implemented term limits for its officers, however, term limits were repealed in 1932. In 1941, tire and gasoline rationing from World War II affected rural carriers. NRLCA President Walker gained some exemptions from rationing for rural carriers. In 1946, the National Association of Letter Carriers (NALC) expressed interest in incorporating RFD into their union. In 1947, the NRLCA declined.

On January 17, 1962, President John F. Kennedy signed executive order 10988 establishing employee-management cooperation in the federal service. Rural carriers selected the NRLCA as their agent, and on July 12, the NRLCA became the first postal union to sign a national exclusive contract with the USPS. To qualify, unions needed to demonstrate that they did not discriminate based upon race. Thus, the stipulation that only white delegates shall be eligible to seats in the national convention was quietly lifted from article 3 of the NRLCA's constitution without the passing of a resolution or bylaw. Separate gender pay was also abolished in a ruling by Attorney General Robert F. Kennedy.

On September 8, 1978, the NRLCA was the first postal union to come to an agreement on a new contract when contract negotiations between the USPS and its unions nearly resulted in an illegal mail strike.

After the NALC severed bargaining ties with the American Postal Workers Union in 1994, NALC President Vince Sombrotto tried to get the NRLCA to join the NALC. His effort was unsuccessful.

On November 14, 2008, the NRLCA withdrew support from the Quality of Work Life/Employee Involvement (QWL/EI) program. As the USPS funded all QWL-EI activities, it became more focused on issues supporting corporate goals. The NRLCA saw QWL/EI headed in a different direction than improving the "quality of work life" for rural carriers and managers alike. On December 12, 2008, the USPS confirmed that QWL/EI will be closed entirely. As NRLCA President Don Cantriel put it, "They were looking for an excuse to get rid of it; we gave it to them."

On August 19, 2011, the NRLCA became the first labor union in the history of the United States Postal Service to elect a female president, Jeanette Dwyer, at its 107th National Convention in Savannah, Georgia. She served until 2018, when she chose not to run for re-election, and was succeeded by her Vice President, Ronnie Stutts. Dwyer rejoined the board to fill the remainder of Johnny Miller's unexpired term on November 21, 2020, and stayed on the board until 2025.

=== RRECS & calls for decertification ===
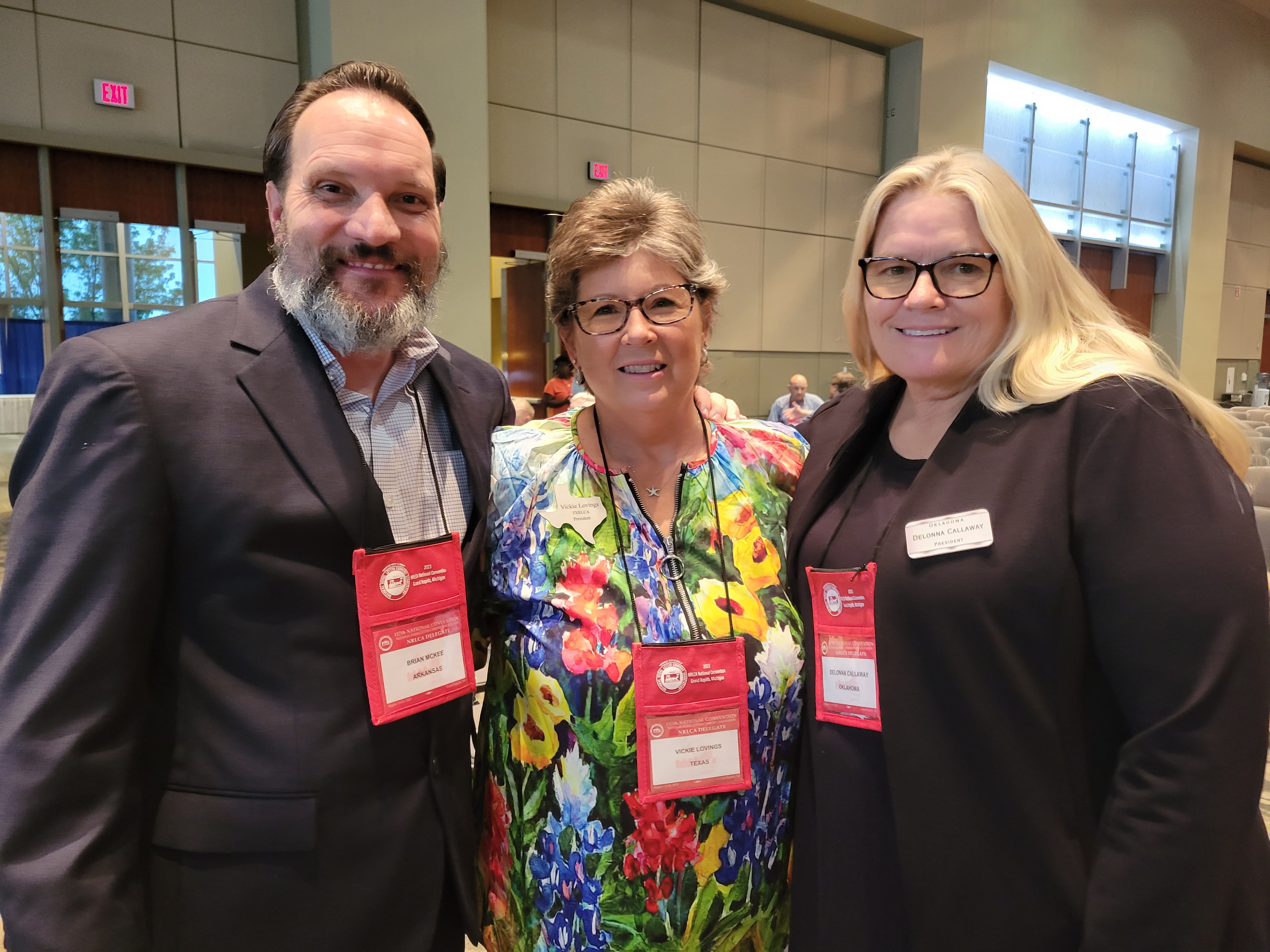
State Presidents Brian McKee of Arkansas, Vickie Lovings of Texas & Delonna Callaway of Oklahoma at the 2023 convention

On July 3, 2012, the postal service & NRLCA agreed to create the Rural Route Evaluated Compensation System (RRECS). From January 2013 to June 2018, a panel of engineers, consisting of Ken Mericle, Don Ratliff & Luis Martín-Vega, began developing an automated system that captured daily counts of work activities (whereas the evaluated pay system was originally based upon a 2 week count). Count data is also captured from mapping software developed by the project. Mapping captures the line of travel for each route, plus the distances of mailstops, mailboxes and direct door delivery stops associated with each customer address. These mapped locations are used to calculate walking and driving distances.

RRECS had a devastating effect on rural carrier pay. Two-thirds of all rural letter carriers lost at least one hour per week, and 44% lost four hours or more. Only 14% of rural carriers actually gained hours. The changes also added days worked while reducing hours on those days, reducing opportunities for overtime. The number of K routes (routes evaluated at 5 days a week) dropped from 65,910 to 49,747, a difference of 16,163. J routes (5.5 days a week) increased from 5,012 to 11,429, and H routes (routes carried 6 days a week without a relief day) increased from 3,427 to 13,142, an increase of 9,715. Overall, rural carriers on average lost about 2.8 hours from their routes after RRECS went into effect.

On March 20, 2023, the NRLCA was notified that because of system issues, the PS Forms 4241-A could not be generated, causing a delay in RRECS implementation until at least April 8. On April 7, the NRLCA & USPS reached an agreement to delay the implementation of the initial rural route evaluations under RRECS until April 22, despite the NRLCA seeking a 60 day delay. On April 21, the NRLCA & USPS reached a second agreement to delay its implementation until May 6.

On May 5, a group of U.S. Senators, consisting of Democrats Ron Wyden, Elizabeth Warren, Sherrod Brown, Ed Markey & John Fetterman and Independent Bernie Sanders, sent a letter to United States postmaster general Louis DeJoy saying RRECS should not be used until the system’s serious flaws are rectified. Regardless, the system went into effect the following day.

Many carriers across the nation felt the NRLCA did little to prevent RRECS from going into effect or communicating its rollout to members. Soon, calls for decertification of the NRLCA grew within the craft. Shortly after the 117th national convention in Grand Rapids, Michigan, new president Don Maston and the NRLCA released the following statement on the topic:

What happens if the NRLCA is decertified?

The NRLCA will no longer be able to represent rural letter carriers.

The National Agreement will be nullified: Every right and term or condition of employment currently guaranteed by the Agreement must be re-negotiated without any assurance that it will be reinstated. Some of the things at serious risk are:

- Current salary rates and guaranteed salary increases
- Twice-a-year COLA adjustments
- EMA rates
- Grievance and Arbitration provisions
- Just cause protections for discipline and termination. (You will bean at-will employee)
- No layoff provisions
- Seniority rights
- Scheduling rights
- Protections from subcontracting (CDS)
- Health insurance, life insurance, and retirement benefits.
- Work rules

You will lose your Union stewards and representatives.

The Union has invested millions of dollars in an extensive and effective steward system. With decertification, your District Representatives, Assistant District Representatives, Area Stewards, and Local Stewards will be stripped of their legal authority to help resolve grievances and other workplace conflicts.

Management will have ALL of the power.

The rights bargained for in collective bargaining with the Postal Service since 1970 will no longer be guaranteed, and without a collective bargaining agreement, Postal Management will have the unilateral right to set wages and working conditions.

There is no guarantee that you will be represented by another union.

Signing a decertification petition only guarantees an election as to whether the NRLCA will represent you. To replace the NRLCA, another union would have to agree to represent rural carriers, and a majority of rural carriers would have to vote (in a separate election) to establish the new union as the collective bargaining representative.

In order for calls to decertify the NRLCA to be successful, at least 30% of rural carriers must sign cards or a petition asking the National Labor Relations Board to conduct an election. Unless a majority of the votes cast in the election are in favor of union representation, the union will be decertified. Roughly 34,000 signatures would have needed to be collected by December 28, 2023 in order to give the NLRB enough time to verify the signatures and mail ballots.

== NRLCA Constitution ==
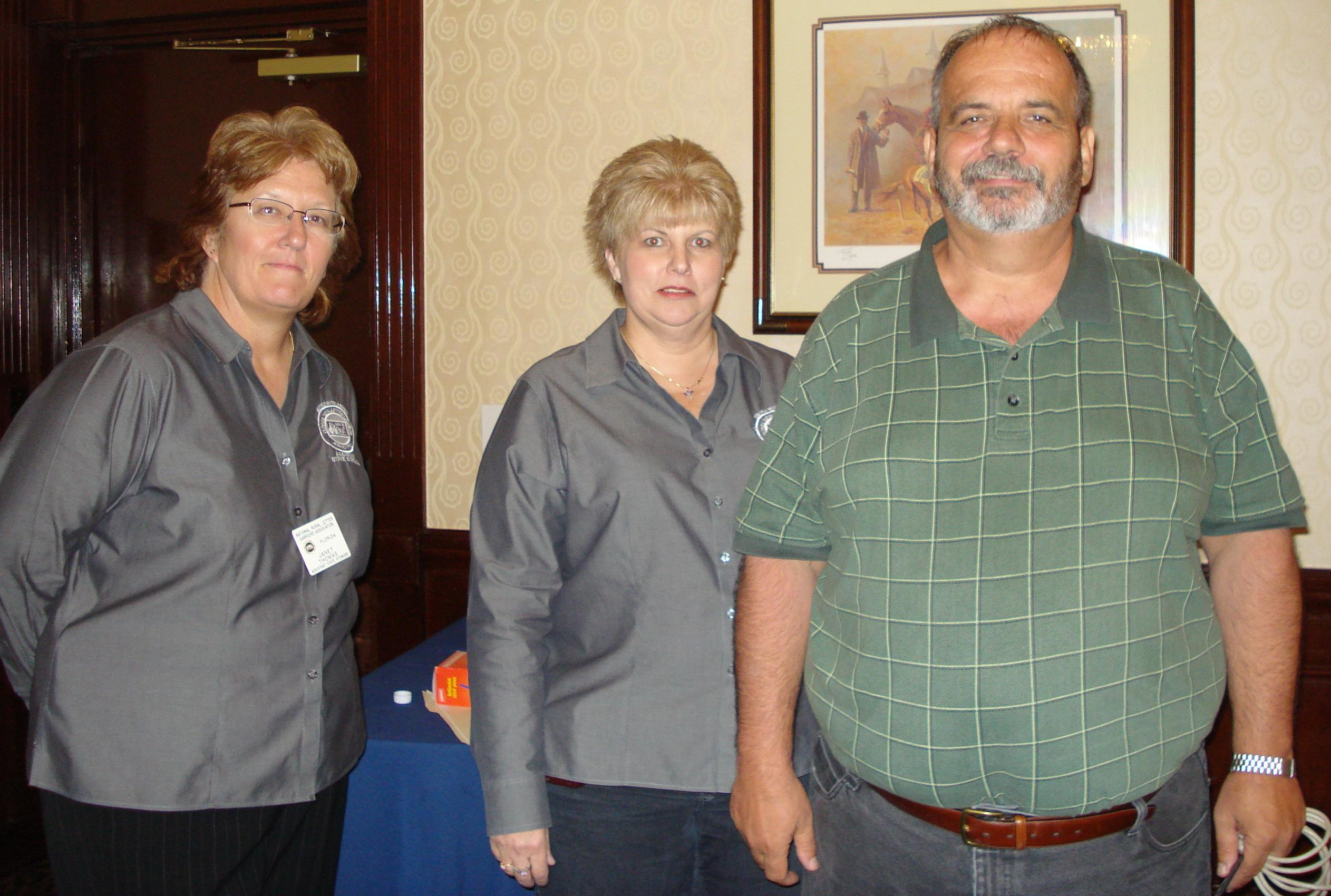
Prior to the National Steward System, Allan Jones (right) served as Florida's state steward. Janet Thomas & Linda Wiersema were his assistant State Stewards. In 2011, Thomas & Wiersema became district representatives in Florida, and Jones was named the national headquarters' labor relations specialist.

The NRLCA ratified its first constitution on day two of its first national convention in Chicago, Illinois, September 12, 1903. Henry Haven Windsor, editor of Popular Mechanics magazine as well as the RFD News (now The National Rural Letter Carrier) and chair of the Constitution & Bylaws Committee, presented his committee's report, followed by discussion on each article. One of the many topics discussed was union dues. Originally, the NRLCA sought one dollar a year from its members, however, this was negotiated down to fifty cents a year by the time this constitution was ratified (In 1910, dues were raised to 75 cents per year. The following year, it was reduced back down to 50 cents a year. It took until 1919, for dues to reach the dollar originally sought). The articles were amended and approved in order, and after adoption of each separate article, the entire constitution was voted upon and adopted in its entirety.

In 2007, bylaws were eliminated from the NRLCA Constitution, and each state was directed by the National office to do the same with their state constitutions. Existing bylaws were incorporated within the constitution in their appropriate places. As a result, the NRLCA Constitution underwent some renumbering. In 2011, the NRLCA ratified a national steward system.

== National convention ==
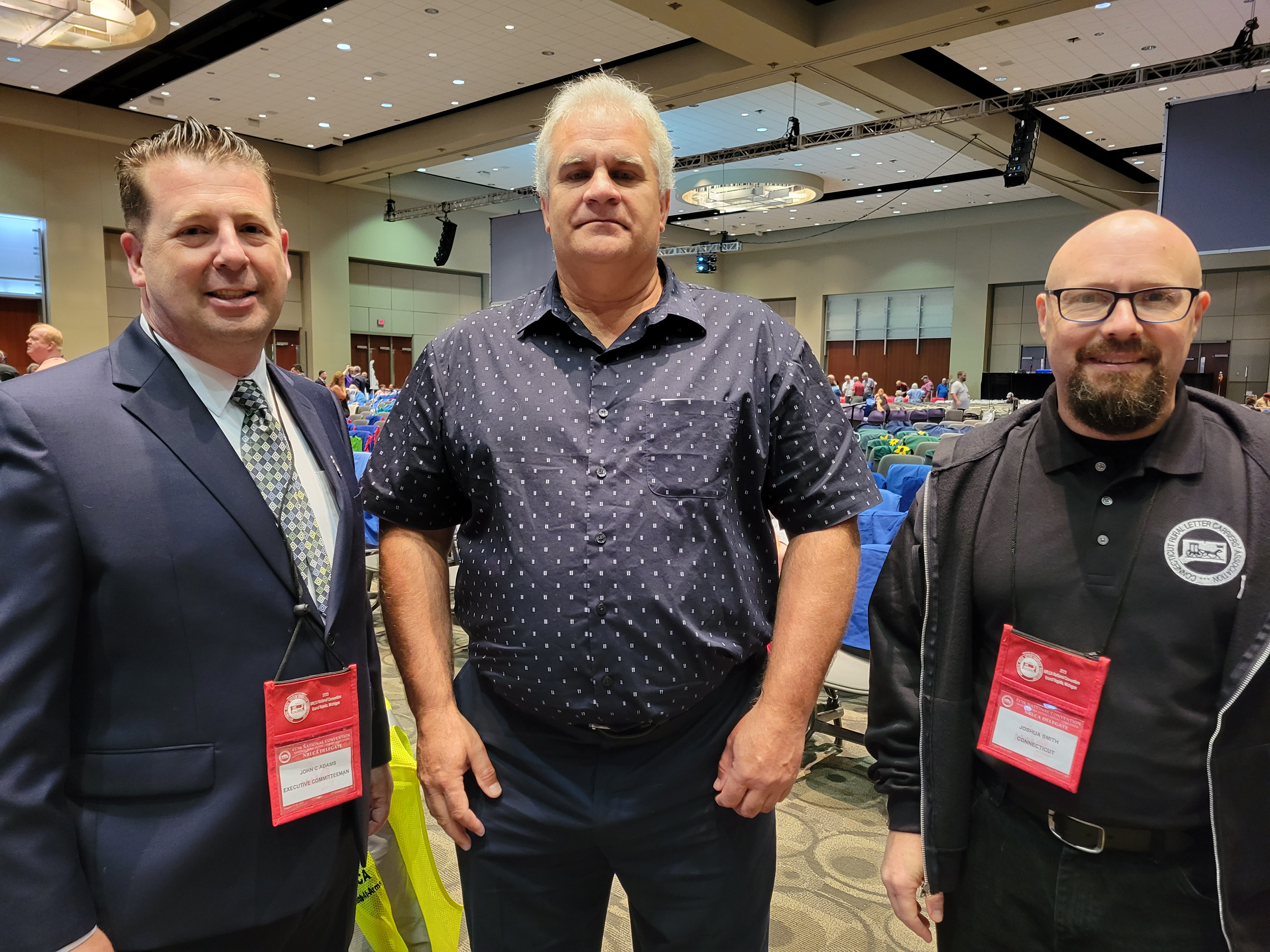
Executive Committeeman John C. Adams, New York district representative Phil Tremper & Connecticut RLCA president Joshua Smith at the 2023 National Convention in Grand Rapids, Michigan

The NRLCA held its first annual national convention in Chicago, Illinois, September 11–12, 1903. The first officers elected to serve the NRLCA on day two of the NRLCA's first national convention (September 12, 1903) were:

- President: Frank H. Cunningham (Omaha, Nebraska)
- Vice President: B. Pitts Woods (Cherokee, Iowa)
- Secretary: W. F. Tumber (Lockport, New York)
- Treasurer: W. L. Fetters (Bluffton, Indiana)
- Executive Committee: H. E. Niven (Berthoud, Colorado), F. A. Putnam (Dudley, Massachusetts) and E. Dwyer (Aurora, Illinois)

In 1908, women attended the NRLCA national convention for the first time. During World War II, the convention was limited to a small conference in St. Paul, Minnesota, in 1942, and Cincinnati, Ohio, the following two years. In 1945, a National Board Session was held in lieu of a delegate gathering. In attendance were 52 delegates from fifteen states. The host state was represented by the most delegates with thirteen, followed by Michigan with twelve. Indiana and Nebraska both had five, Missouri had four, Iowa had three, Minnesota, New York and Ohio each had two and Colorado, Georgia, Massachusetts and Wisconsin all had one. While represented by the NRLCA, neither Kansas nor Oklahoma had a representative in attendance.

The 2020 convention, which was set to take place in Spokane, Washington, August 18–21 was canceled due to COVID-19, as was the 2021 convention. The only other year a national convention was not held was 1918, when it was canceled due to World War I.

== Contract with the USPS ==
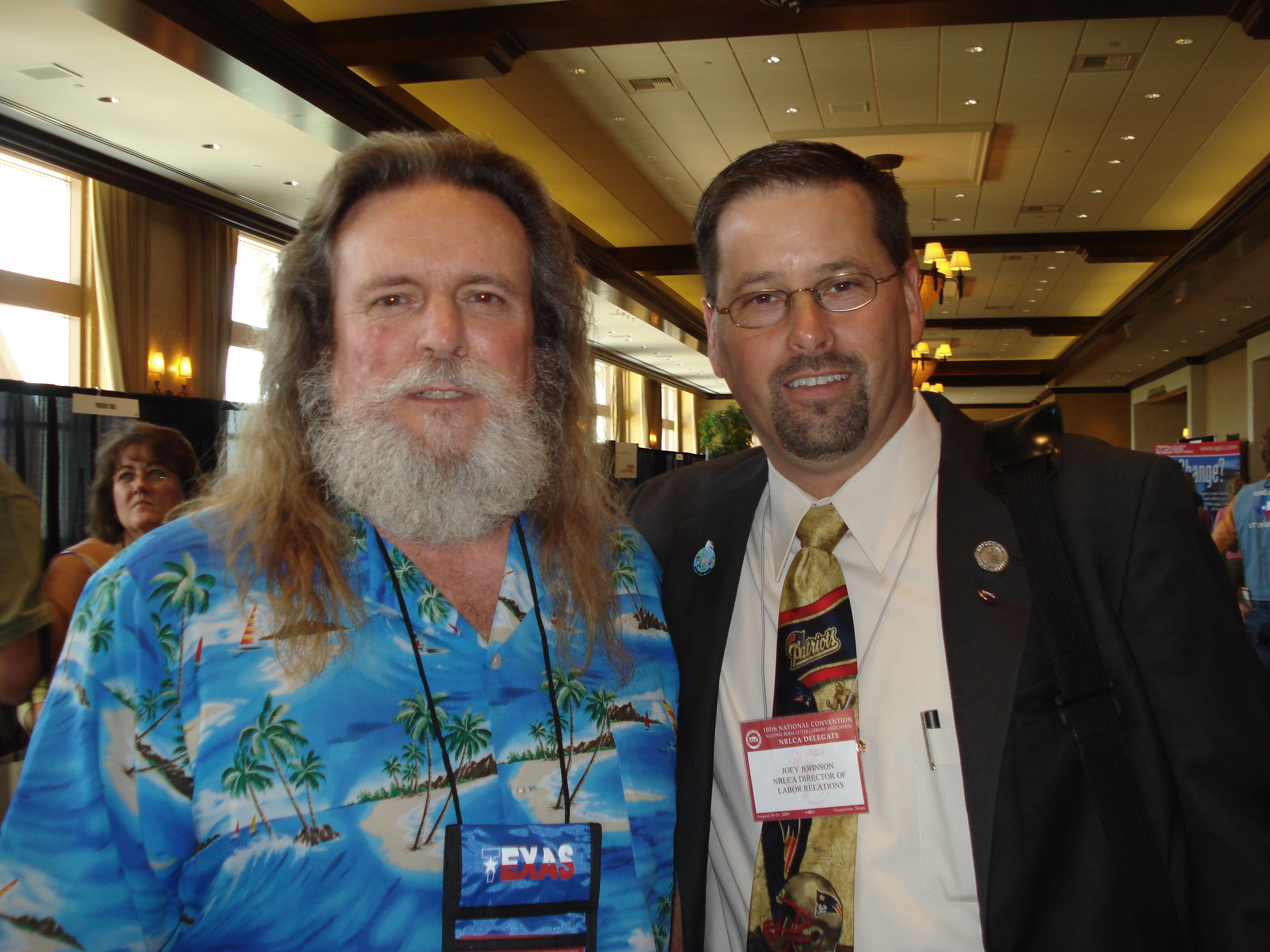
Randy Anderson & Joey Johnson both served as NRLCA Directors of Labor Relations

The NRLCA negotiates all labor agreements for the rural carrier craft with the Postal Service, including salaries. Rural carriers are considered bargaining unit employees in the USPS. This means that there is a contract between the Postal Service and the NRLCA. Only the NRLCA can represent members of the rural carrier craft in the grievance procedure, including providing protection in disciplinary actions.

Following the establishment of executive order 10988 in 1962, the NRLCA and USPS established their first national agreement on a contract for rural carriers. As a result of this contract, the Heavy Duty Agreement, or Evaluated Pay System was established (Rural Carriers are paid a salary based upon an evaluation of their particular route. Credit is given to all carriers' duties and compensated accordingly). On August 12, 1970, President Richard Nixon signed the Postal Reorganization Act (PRA). The Post Office Department became the United States Postal Service, and the NRLCA became a union, with collective bargaining rights for wages and fringe benefits.

When the 2007 contract between the NRLCA and USPS expired, rural carriers were operating without a contract for nearly two years. With the contract set to expire in December 2010, at midnight, November 20, 2010, negotiations between the NRLCA and USPS on a new contract ended in an impasse, and went into third party arbitrator.

On July 3, 2012, arbitrator Jack Clarke imposed a new contract upon the NRLCA and USPS that ran through 2015. Concessions by the NRLCA in the new contract mirrored concessions made by the APWU a year earlier. NRLCA director of labor relations Joey Johnson voted with the USPS arbitrator to accept the contract despite a two-year wage freeze, a two-tiered wage structure and increased health care costs (from 19% to 24%). Substitute rural carriers and RCAs hired under the new contract faced a twenty percent cut in pay with no cost-of-living increases. New hire pay was cut from $19.45 to $15.56 per hour.

On April 25, 2016, President Jeanette Dwyer met with Postmaster General Megan Brennan and other postal officials at USPS headquarters for the signing of a new national agreement to run to 2018. It is the first negotiated agreement between the Postal Service and NRLCA in more than 20 years not to go to arbitration. NRLCA members ratified the agreement in April with 83% of votes cast in favor. The most current agreement between the USPS and NRLCA was ratified on June 16, 2025 with 67% of NRLCA postal workers voting to approve the contract.

== NRLCA Presidents ==
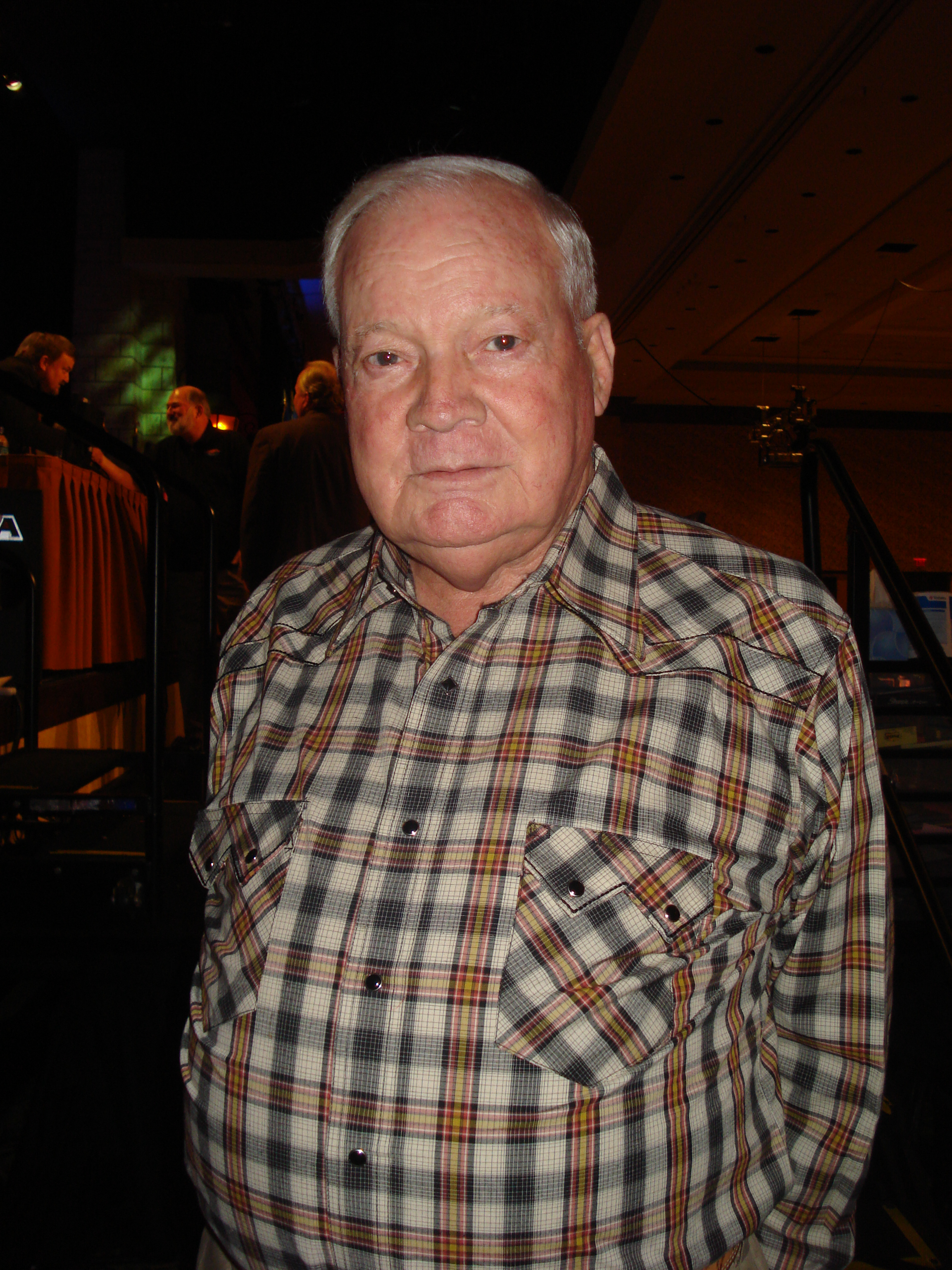
William Brown, Jr.

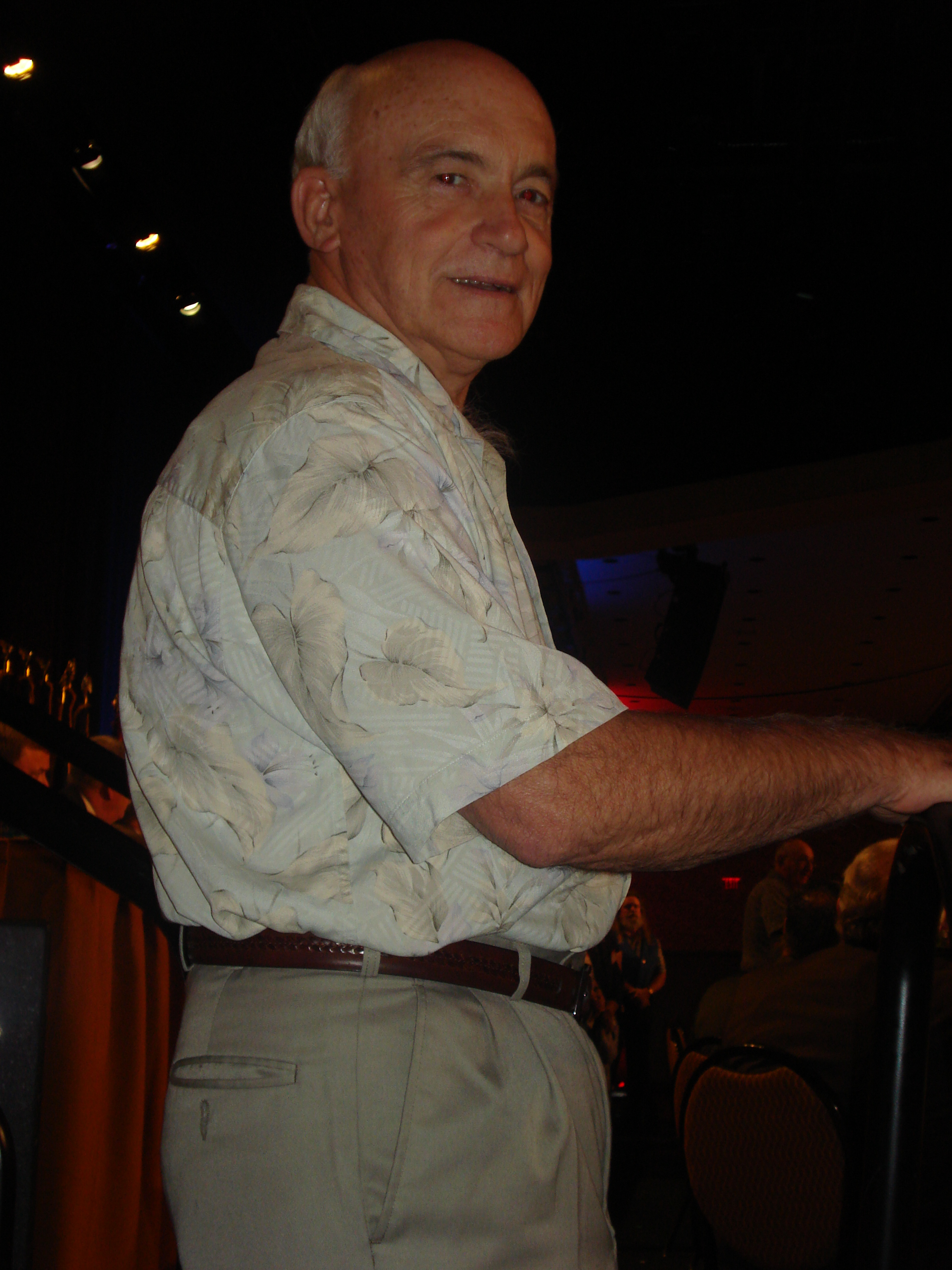
Scottie B. Hicks

Gus Baffa

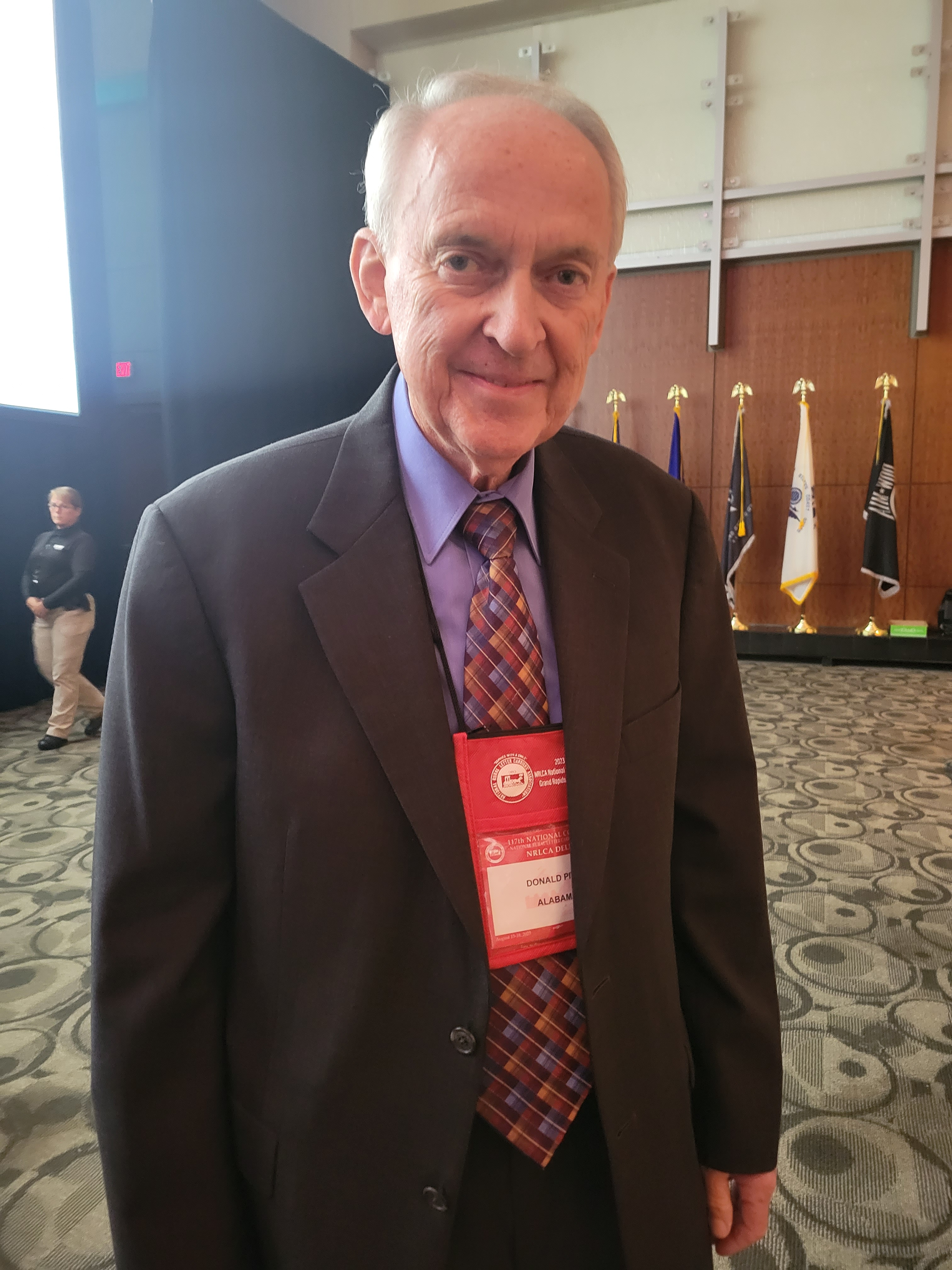
Donnie Pitts

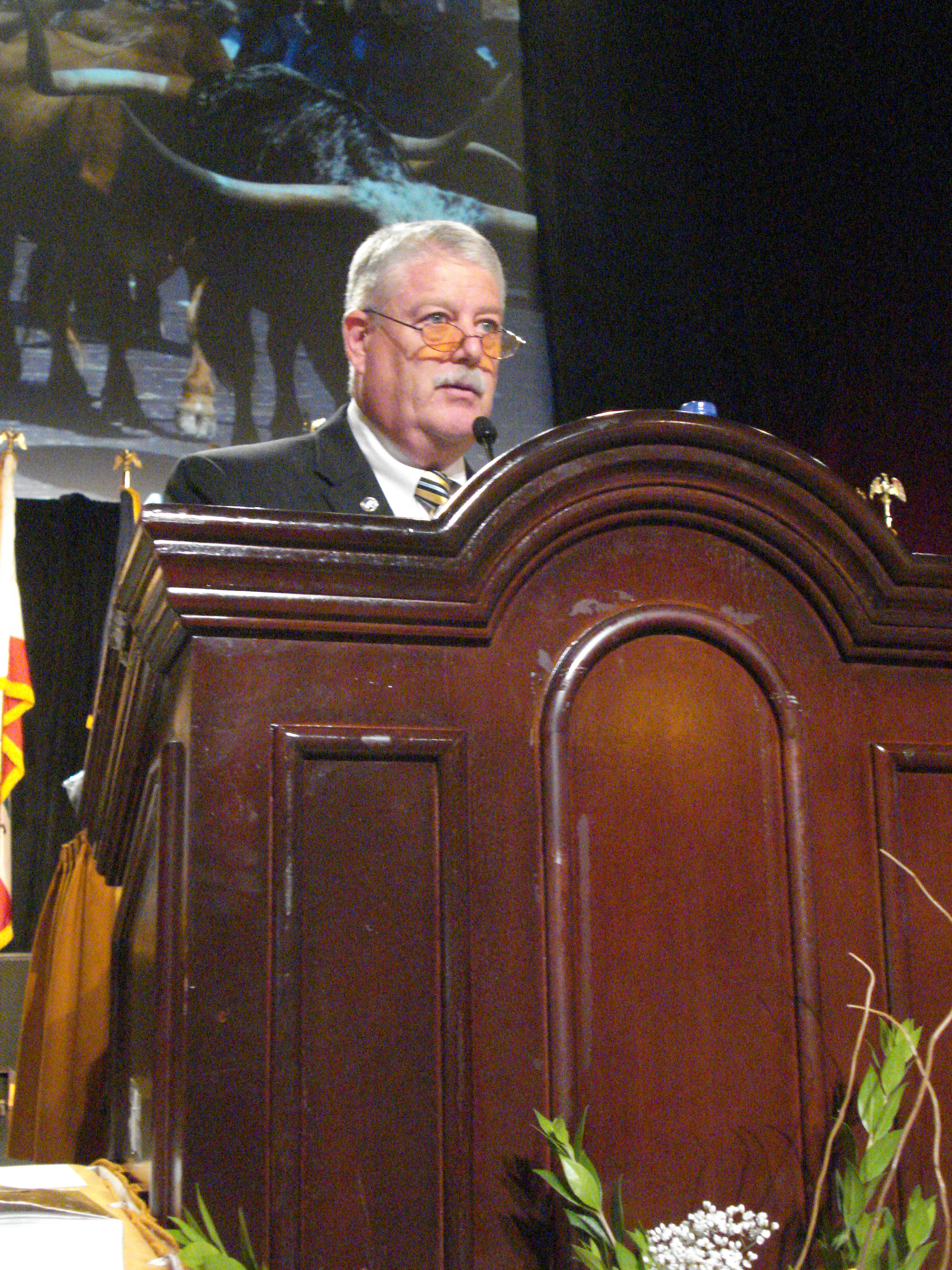
Don Cantriel

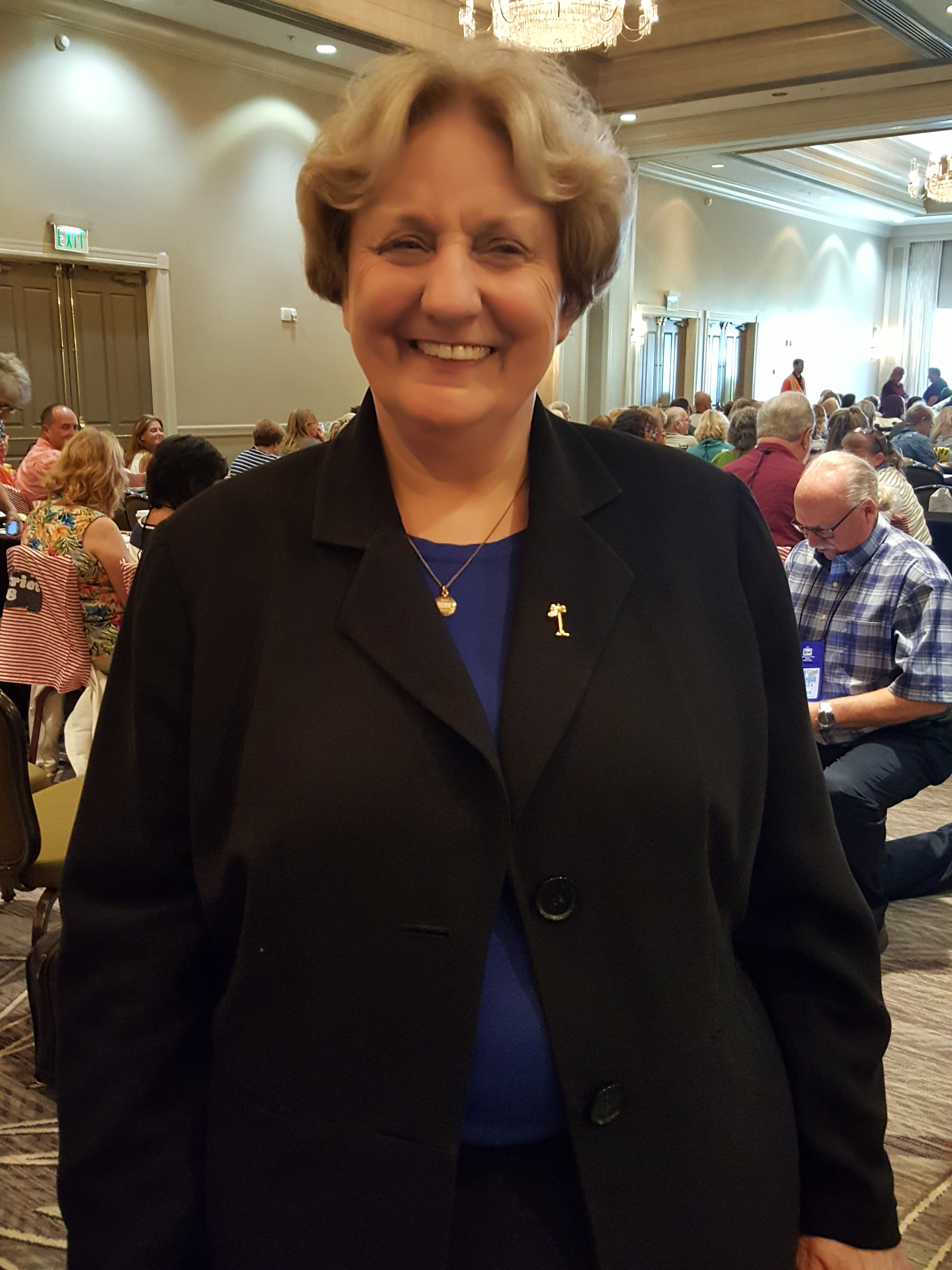
Jeanette P. Dwyer

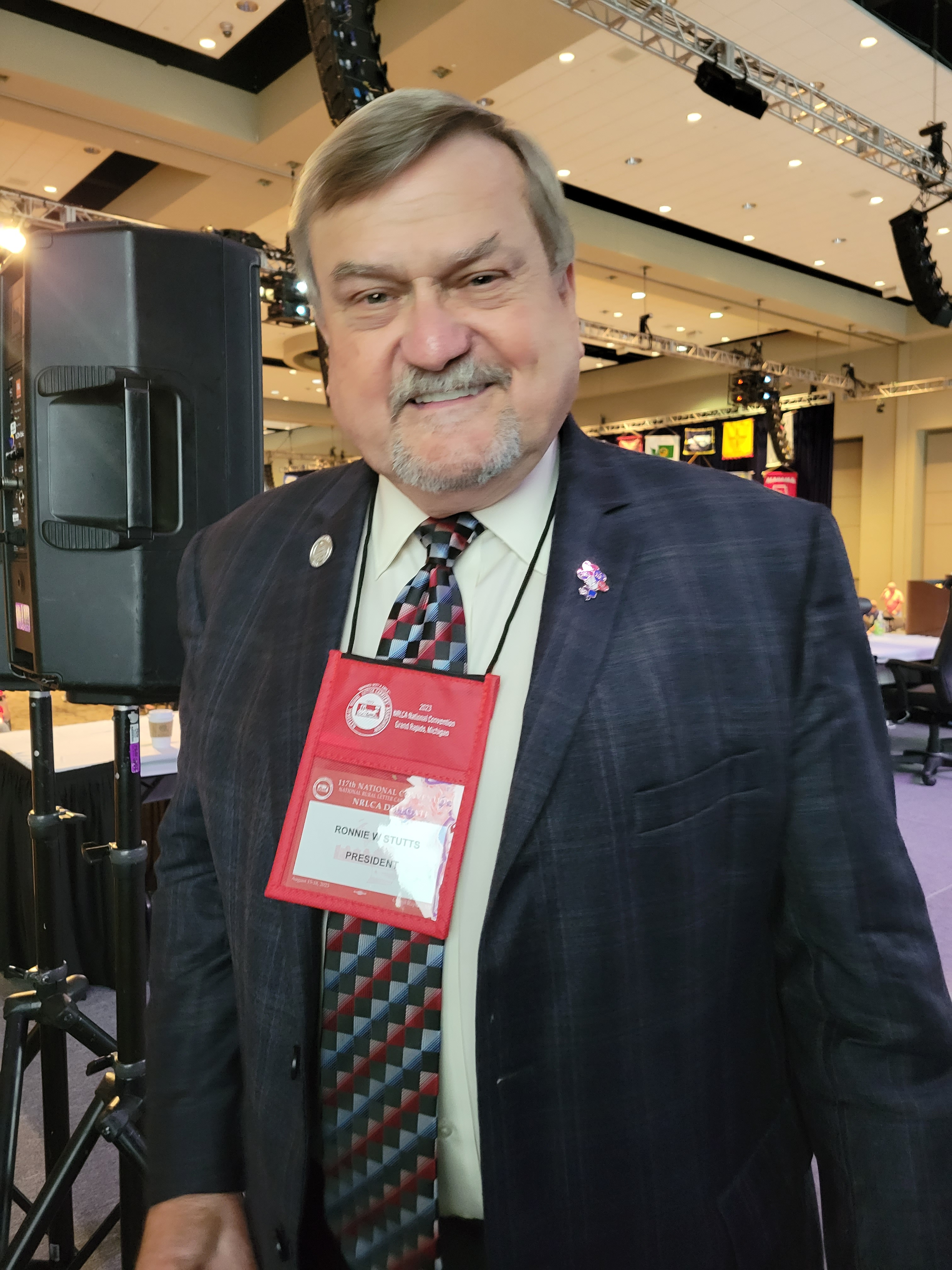
Ronnie W. Stutts

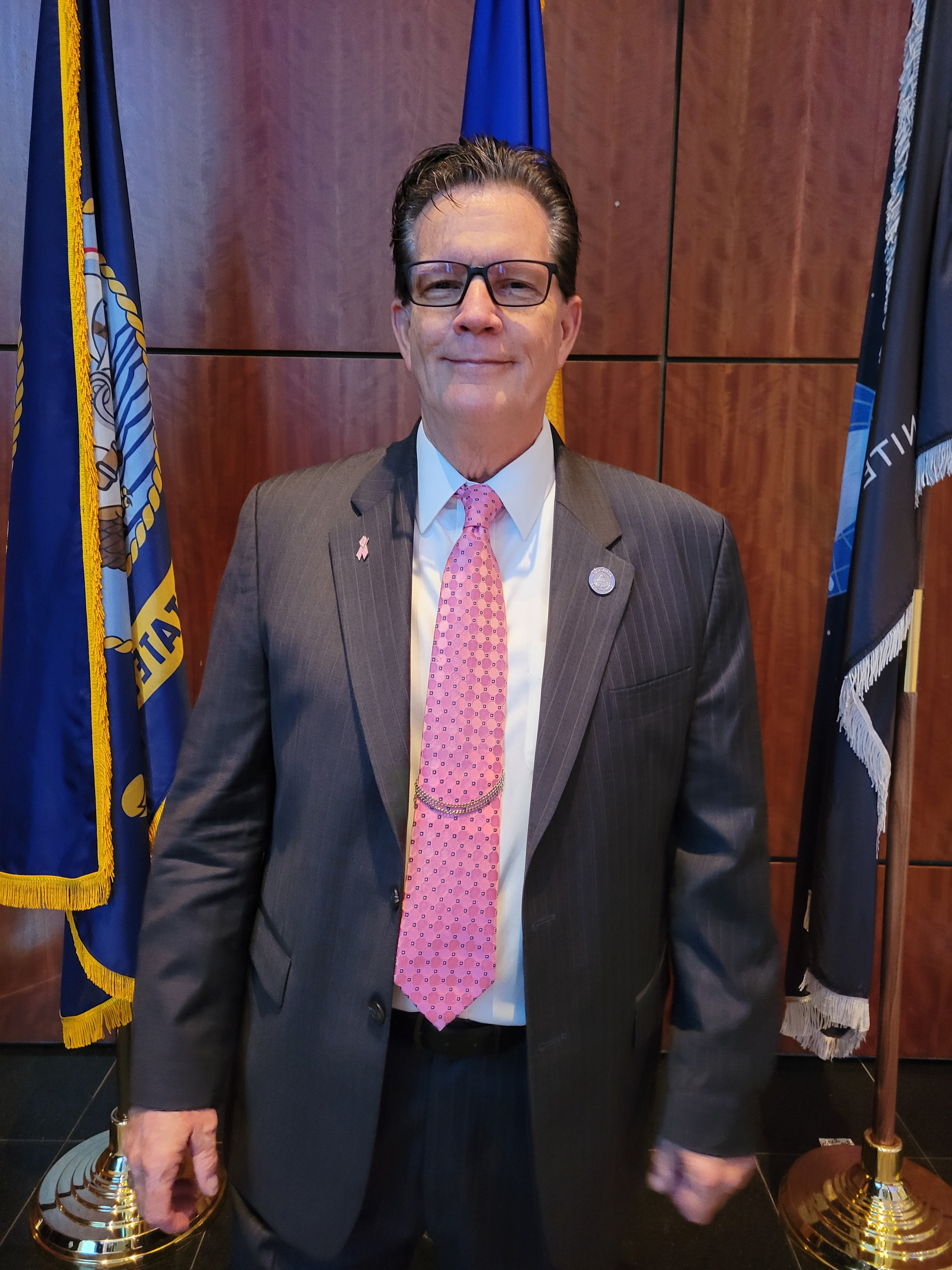
Don Maston

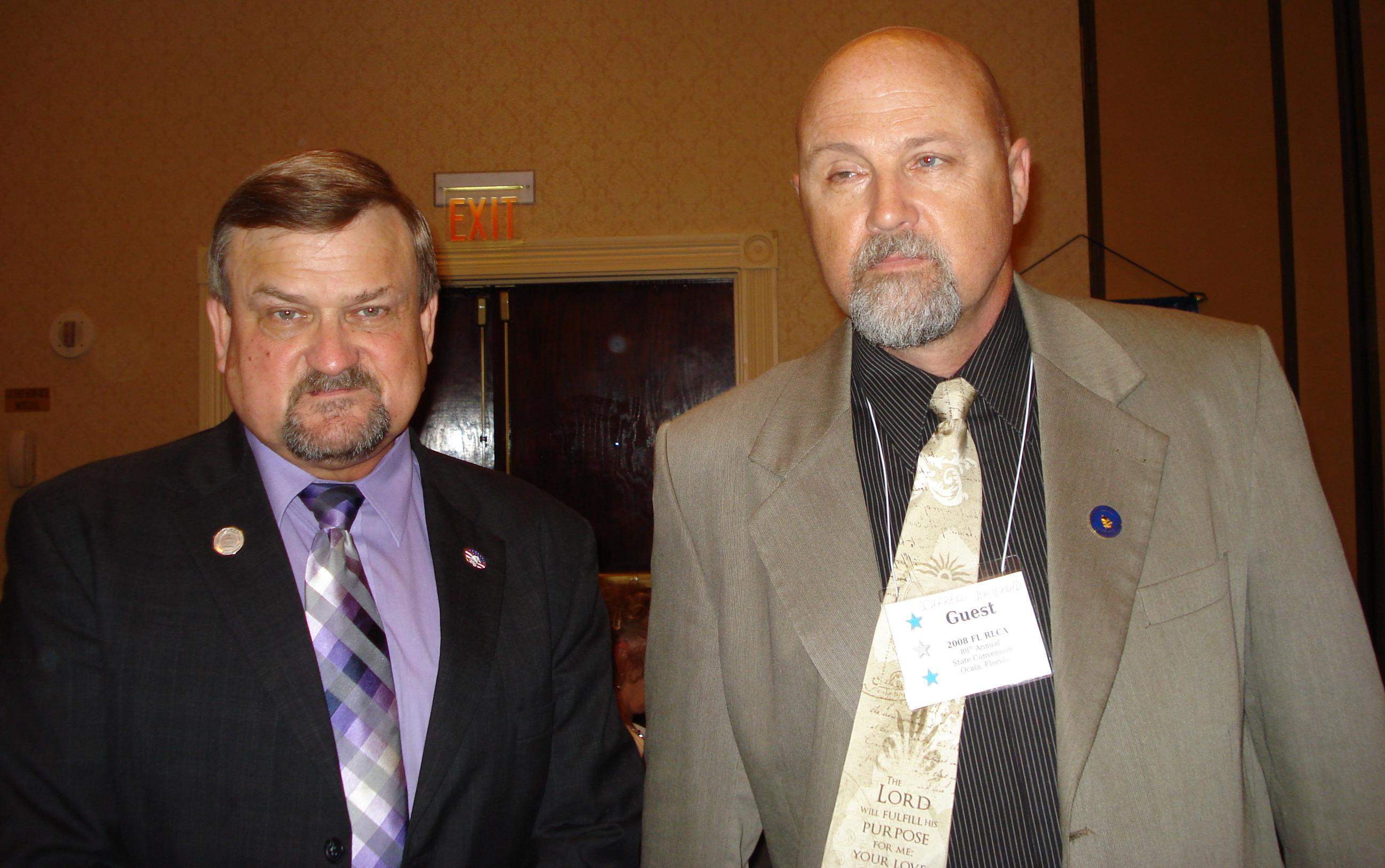
Ronnie Stutts & Georgia President Darrell Whitehead

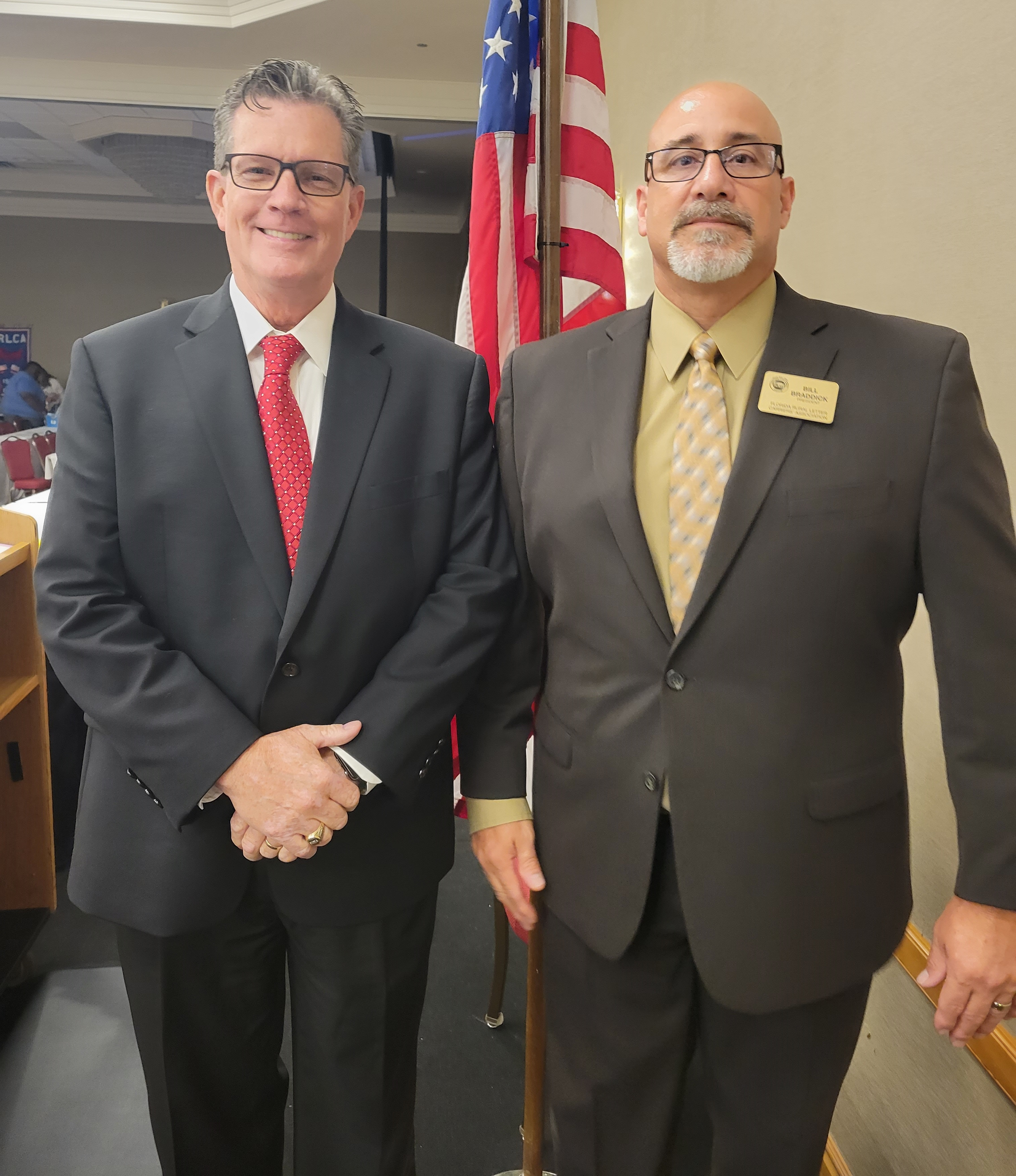
Don Maston & Florida state President William Braddick

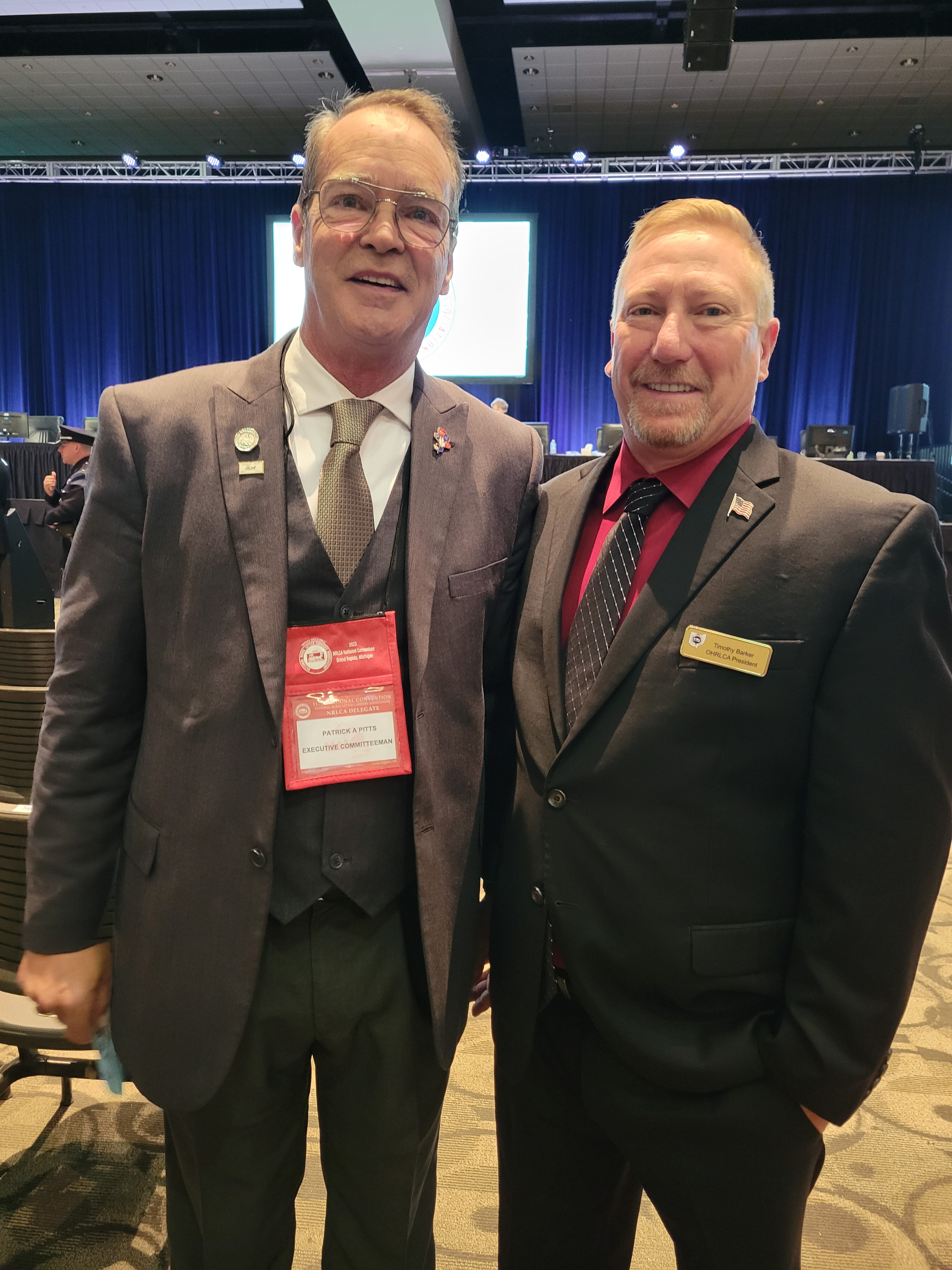
Patrick A. Pitts & OHRLCA President Timothy Barker

NRLCA presidents
NRLCA President	Start year	End year
F. H. Cunningham	1903	1904
P.L. Lindsay	1905	1908
Elias Frey	1909	
E.A. McMahon	1910	1911
L.N. Brockway	1912	1913
George W. Kime	1914	1915
Fred L. White	1916	
Claude Smith	1917	1919
E.D. Landwehr	1920	1921
A.P. Lang	1922	1924
W.A. Keown	1925	
Ned H. Goodell	1928	1929
W.G. Armstrong	1930	1934
J.E. Cooper	1935	
R.H. Combs	1936	1939
L.M. Walker	1940	1941
Wiley M. Riedel	1942	
T.G. Walters	1943	1945
B.A. Winquest	1946	1947
Willard L. Manning	1948	1949
C.L. Ashcraft	1950	
Bud Raley	1951	1952
Paul G. Benson	1953	
W.B. Bledsoe	1954	1955
Ray L. Hulick	1956	1957
C.R. Larson	1958	1959
T.M. Martin	1960	1961
Max H. Jordan	1962	1963
F.E. Huffman	1964	1965
C.W. Hilliard	1966	1967
H.F. Alfrey	1968	1969
C.E. Olmstead	1970	1972
R.M. Rainwater	1973	1974
L.F. Miller	1975	1976
C.E. Edwards	1977	1978
Dean King	1979	1980
Wilbur S. Wood	1981	1982
Tom W. Griffith	1983	1985
Olin Armentrout	1986	
Dallas N. Fields	1987	1988
Vernon H. Meier	1989	1990
William R. Brown, Jr.	1991	1993
Scottie B. Hicks	1994	1996
Steven R. Smith	1997	2000
Gus Baffa	2001	2003
Dale Holton	2004	2005
Donnie Pitts	2006	2007
Don Cantriel	2008	2011
Jeanette P. Dwyer	2011	2018
Ronnie Stutts	2018	2023
Don Maston	2023	2026
Patrick A. Pitts	2026	Present

== NRLCA-PAC ==
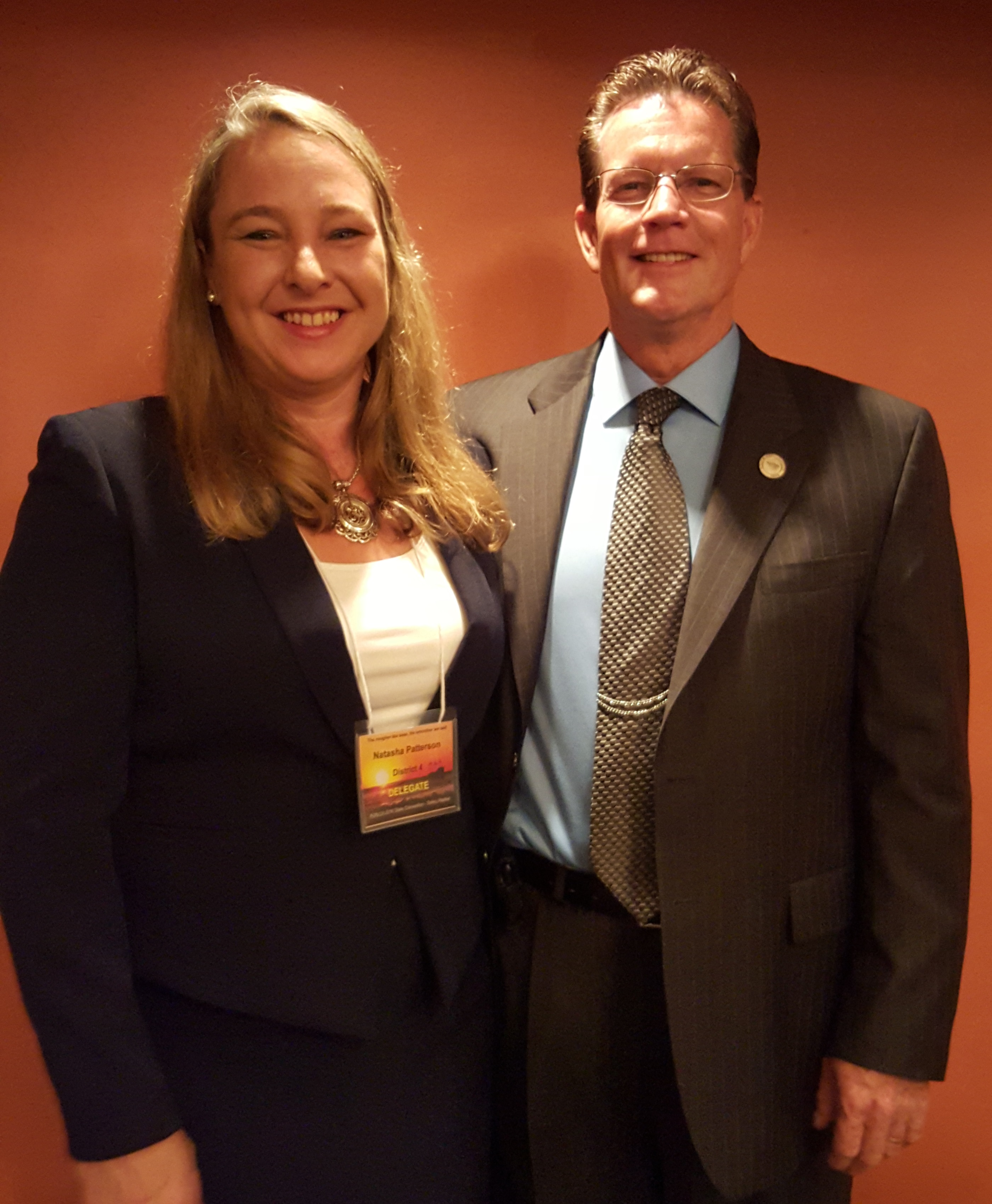
PAC Chair Natasha Patterson & Don Maston

The Political Action Committee (NRLCA-PAC) was created in 1975 to represent rural letter carrier interests on Capitol Hill by lobbying key government officials and staff on privatization of the postal service, five day delivery and other issues affecting rural carriers. NRLCA-PAC supports members currently in Congress who are friendly to its positions, gains access to members who are on key congressional committees whose jurisdiction affects issues that are important to the rural carrier craft, and develops relationships with current and new congressional candidates. NRLCA-PAC also educates and alerts NRLCA membership on key issues & developments and encourages rural carriers to become involved legislatively.

=== Five-day delivery ===
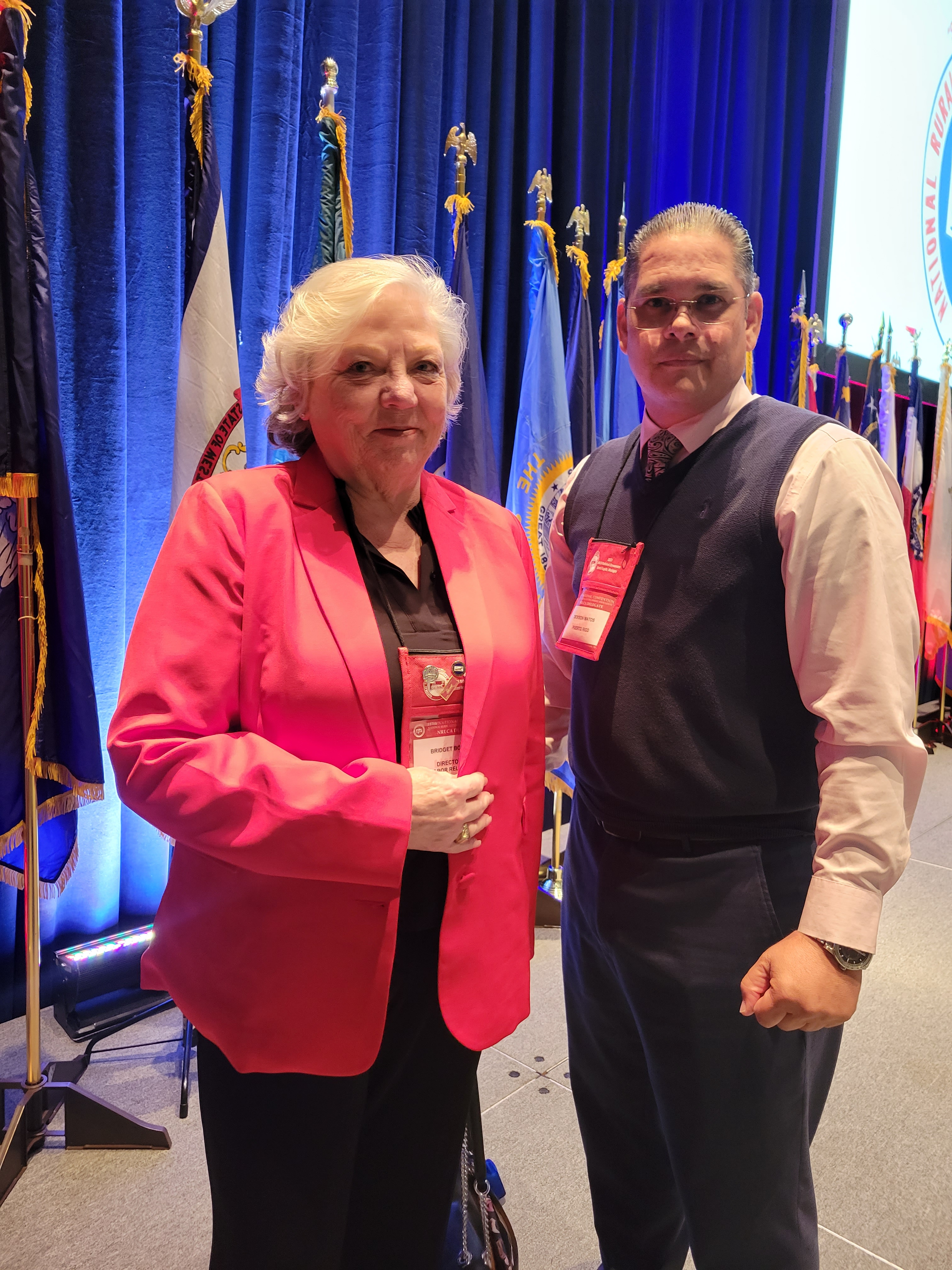
Director of Labor Relations Bridget Boseak & Puerto Rico President Dickson Matos

In the 1970s, Postmaster General Benjamin F. Bailar suggested five-day delivery as a means of battling high energy costs resulting from the Organization of Arab Petroleum Exporting Countries' (OAPEC) embargo that resulted in a worldwide oil crisis. The NRLCA opposed five-day delivery; a bill to block five-day delivery was introduced by Rep. James M. Hanley (D-NY).

On January 28, 2009, Postmaster General John E. Potter testified before the Senate that if the Postal Service is not able to readjust their payment toward the pre-funding of retiree health benefits, as mandated by the Postal Accountability & Enhancement Act of 2006, the USPS would be forced to consider cutting delivery to five days per week during the summer months of June, July & August.

On June 10, 2009, the NRLCA, along with other union and management groups of the United States Postal Service, was contacted for its input on the study of the impact of five-day delivery along with developing an implementation plan for a five-day service plan. On July 30, 2009, President Don Cantriel voiced opposition to five-day delivery before the House Oversight & Government Reform subcommittee.

On September 30, 2009, the House of Representatives and Senate passed and signed into law H.R. 22, reducing the amount the United States Postal Service pays into the Postal Service Retiree Health Benefits Fund from $5.4 billion to $1.4 billion. PMG Potter continued to unveil a plan to eliminate Saturday mail delivery, regardless. On Thursday, April 15, 2010, PMG Potter testified before the House Committee on Oversight & Government Reform that by the year 2020, the USPS cumulative losses could exceed $238 billion, and that mail volume would drop 15% from 2009.

Postmaster General Patrick R. Donahoe echoed his predecessor's views on five-day delivery when he assumed office in 2011. On February 6, 2013, Donahoe announced that the Postal Service would implement five-day mail delivery beginning August 5, a move he claimed would save $2 billion annually. Later the same day, the NRLCA national board voted unanimously to call for his dismissal, as the universal service obligation and six-day delivery are upheld by Congressional language within Appropriations legislation. Therefore, a reduction in service would require action from the House and Senate. July 16, the House passed the Financial Services and General Government Appropriations bill, which included language protecting six‐day mail delivery, thereby blocking Donahoe's plan. He retired on November 14, 2014.

His replacement, the first female postmaster general Megan Brennan, has been non-committal on five-day versus six-day delivery. While the issue remains on the table in her seeking of an overhaul postal laws, she has stated that she wants to focus on "similarities before differences" as she works with stakeholders, including postal employee unions, to craft her approach to Congress. President Barack Obama's Fiscal Year 2016 budget endorsed the outgoing PMG Donahoe's proposed plan to eliminate six‐day mail delivery.

=== Privatization ===
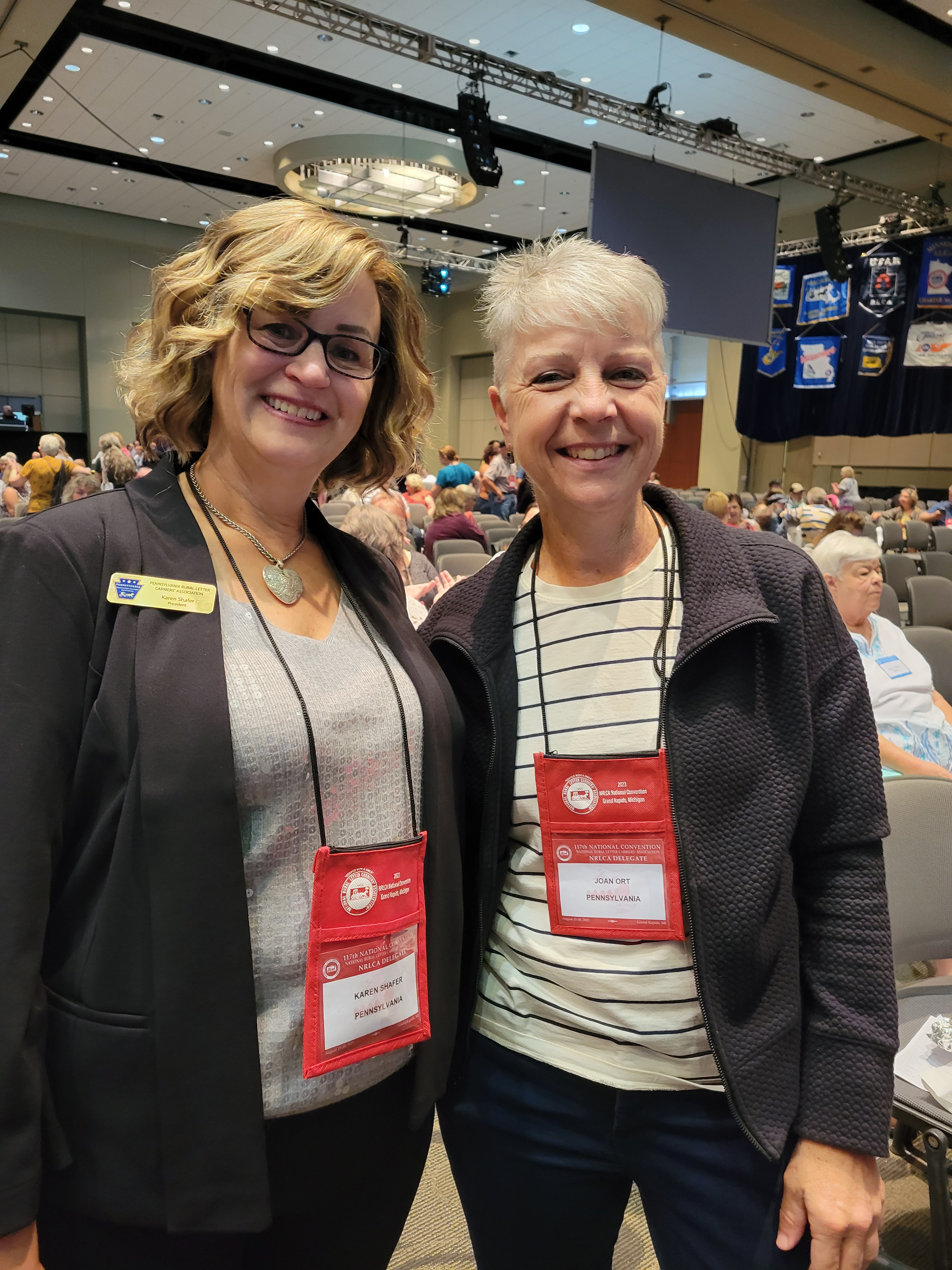
President Karen Shafer & VP Joan Ort of Pennsylvania

On December 17, 2017, President Donald Trump criticized the postal service's relationship with Amazon. In a post on Twitter, the President stated: "Why is the United States Post Office, which is losing many billions of dollars a year, while charging Amazon and others so little to deliver their packages, making Amazon richer and the Post Office dumber and poorer? Should be charging MUCH MORE!" On June 21, 2018, the President proposed a sweeping government reorganization that would sharpen the focus on workforce training, consolidate government-assistance programs and shrink federal agencies. As part of this proposal, he recommended restructuring the postal service with an eye toward privatization. According to his proposal, privatization would cut costs and give the financially burdened agency greater flexibility in adjusting to the digital age.

In the Articles of Confederation of the United States Constitution, Congress possessed the power to establish and regulate post offices (Article 1, Section 8, Clause 7), but does not specify how it is funded. The NRLCA fully opposes privatizing the Postal Service, and has publicly supported House Bill 993 and Senate Bill 933 that would prevent privatization.

=== CDS ===
Contract Delivery Service (CDS) is purchased on a contractual basis by the U.S. Postal Service whereby mail is carried from one USPS specified starting point to another, via highway, by private carriers. CDS carriers are not USPS employees, but are independent contractors who provide mail service on these routes. The NRLCA believes that contract delivery inhibits the security, sanctity and service of the USPS, and believes that Congress should support H.Res. 282 and S. 1457.

=== 2024 Presidential election ===
At 7:29 AM on September 15, 2024, Republican presidential candidate Donald Trump posted on his Truth Social social media platform:

The United States Postal Service has admitted that it is a poorly run mess that is experiencing mail loss and delays at a level never seen before. With this being the FACT, how can we possibly be expected to allow or trust the U.S. Postal Service to run the 2024 Presidential Election? It is not possible for them to do so. HELP!

The next day, the NRLCA responded on Twitter:

FACT CHECK: Rural letter carriers have been safely and securely delivering mail-in ballots for decades, including millions of ballots in 2020 and 2022. We are ready to deliver.

The tweet also included an image of Trump's post with the following headline:

Rural carriers across the country are ready to deliver for the upcoming U.S. Presidential Election in November. The 655,000 hard working men and women of the Postal Service are dedicated to ensuring excellence when it comes to delivering for the American people. Rural letter carriers have been safely and securely delivering mail-in ballots for decades, including millions of ballots in 2020 and 2022.

== Other rural carrier unions ==
In 1920, a secession from the NRLCA resulted in the forming of the National Federation of Rural Letter Carriers; in 1946, the NFRLC merged into the larger NALC. The National Alliance of Postal Employees was formed in 1913 by black employees of the Railway Mail Service. Although the Union was organized to prevent the elimination of blacks from the railway mail service, in 1923, the NAPE became the first industrial union in the United States when it opened its membership to any postal employee who desired to join, regardless of race, sex, creed or religion. The NAPE allowed membership to all eligible postal employees of all crafts, rural carriers included.

== See also ==
- National Association of Letter Carriers
- National Postal Mail Handlers Union
- National Alliance of Postal and Federal Employees
- American Postal Workers Union
- Canadian Postmasters and Assistants Association
