= Jeanette Dwyer =

Politician in United States

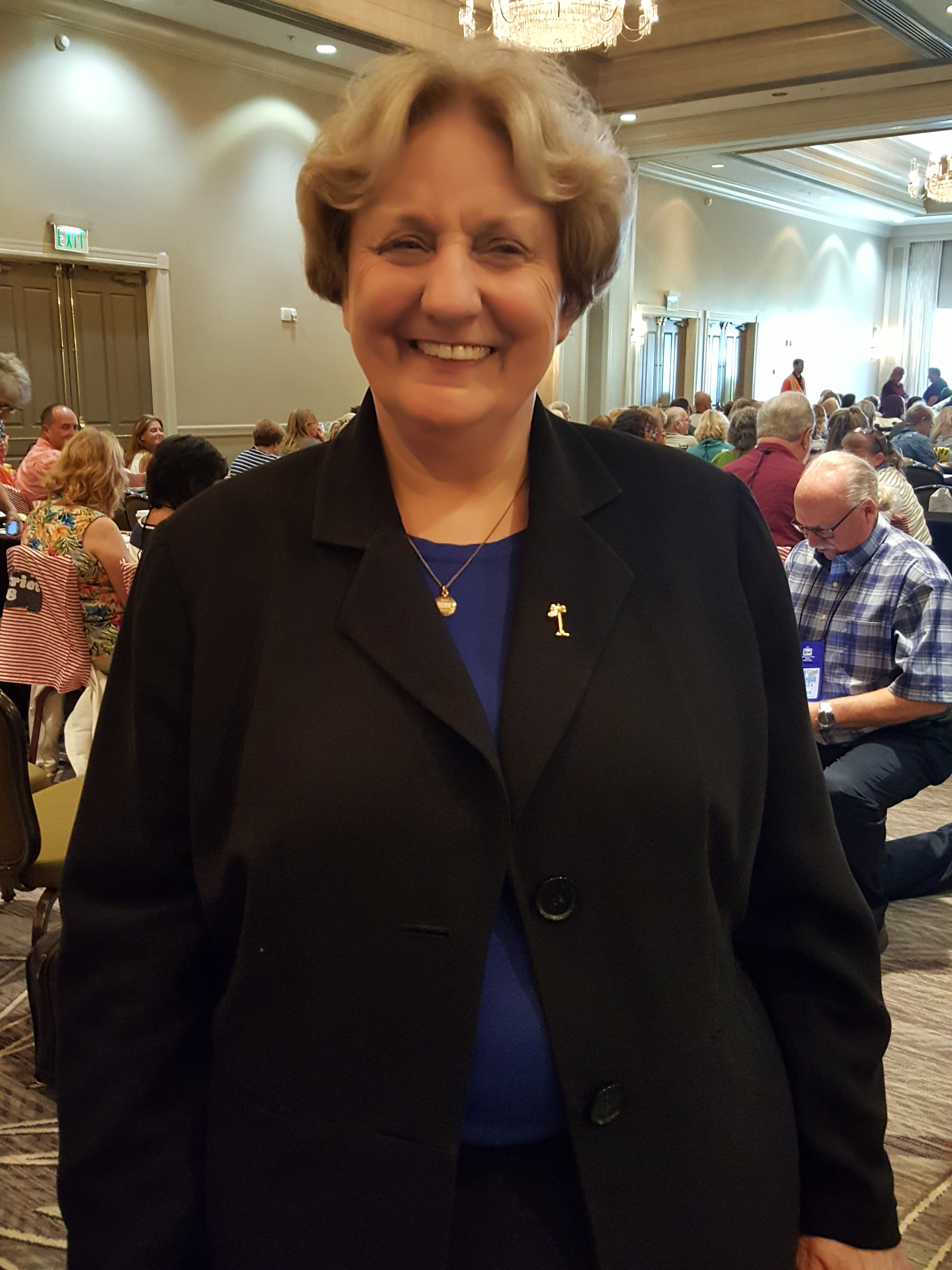
- Born: September 30; Lake Waccamaw, North Carolina, United States
- Occupations: Rural letter carrier, NRLCA President
- Spouse: Larry Dwyer
- Children: 1
- Website: nrlca.org

Jeanette P. Dwyer (September 30) is a former President and national board member of the National Rural Letter Carriers' Association. When she was elected president in 2011, she became the first female president of a labor union in the history of the United States Postal Service. She served as NRLCA president until 2018, when she chose not to run for reelection. She was reappointed to the national board to fill the remainder of Executive Committeeman Johnny Miller's unexpired term on November 21, 2020. Dwyer was re-elected to the board at the 116th national convention in Orlando, Florida on September 9, 2022.

== Postal career ==
Jeanette began her postal career in 1981 as a substitute rural letter carrier (designation code 73) in Lake Waccamaw, North Carolina, and became a regular carrier in 1987. She soon got involved in the NRLCA, becoming the local steward, and soon moving on to State Steward of North Carolina.

== NRLCA National Board ==
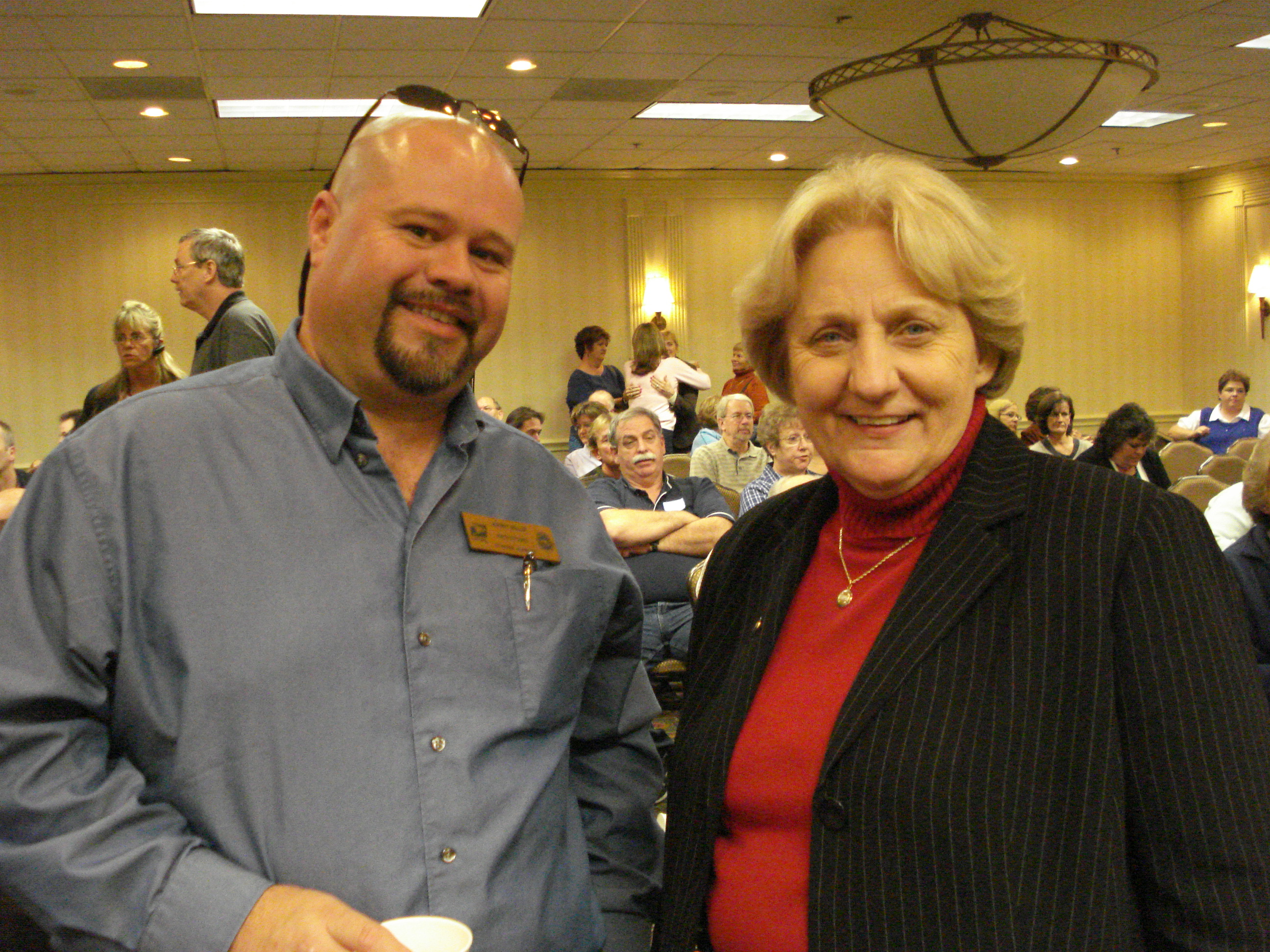
With Alabama State Steward Johnny Miller

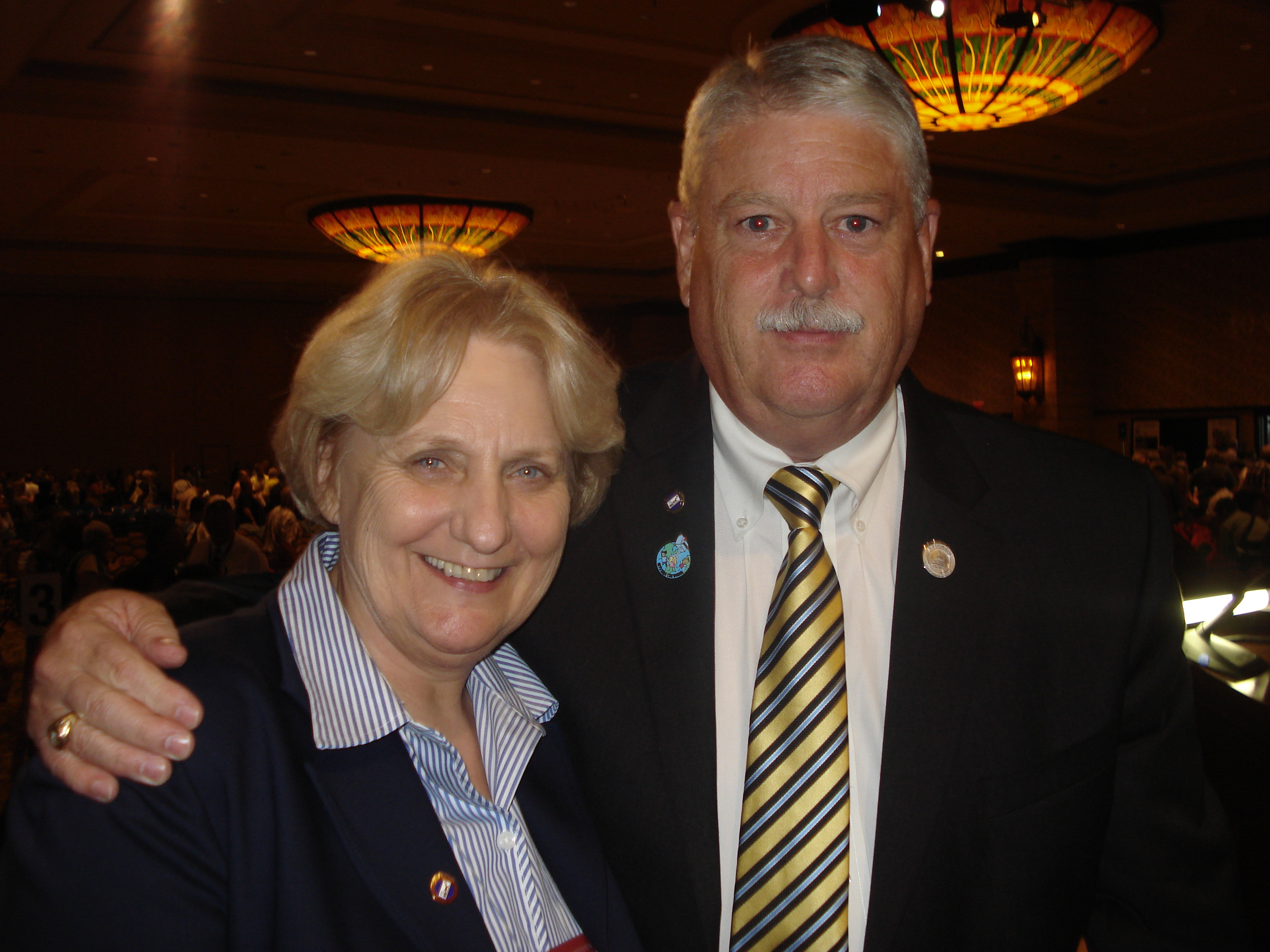
Dwyer with her predecessor, Don Cantriel

Dwyer was elected to the NRLCA national board in 2002. She was elected vice president in 2008. She served on Task Force II, along with three other members, on the Stewards Reference Guide. She also served on the Appeals Committee at National Convention both as a member and chairman of the committee.

== Presidency ==
On August 19, 2011, Jeanette was elected president of the NRLCA at its 107th National Convention in Savannah, Georgia, making the NRLCA the first union of the United States Postal Service ever to elect a female president. The main focus of her tenure as president has been preserving six day mail delivery. In her acceptance speech, she stated:

We all know the Postal Service must change to meet declining mail volume, but some of the proposed changes, such as eliminating six-day delivery, would deny many Americans, including those in rural areas, access to postal services they expect and deserve. Most importantly, we encourage Congress to preserve six-day delivery, which ensures delivery of essential items such as prescription medications. If Saturday delivery is eliminated, customers would be left paying higher prices for other delivery options or would have to drive up to forty miles round trip to the nearest post office.

On February 6, 2013, Postmaster General Patrick R. Donahoe announced that the Postal Service would implement five-day mail delivery beginning August 5, a move he claimed would save $2 billion annually. Later the same day, the national board of the NRLCA voted unanimously to call for his dismissal:

The declaration today by Postmaster General Donahoe that the Postal Service intends to unilaterally reduce mail delivery from six to five days per week is truly reprehensible and irresponsible. The Postmaster General’s announcement would not only circumvent the established legislative process, it will also jeopardize the Postal Service’s enviable standard of service. Which is relied upon by millions of American families nationwide, especially in rural communities.

On February 13, Jeanette testifies before the Senate Committee on Homeland Security & Governmental Affairs during a hearing on U.S. Postal Service Oversight. On July 16, the House passed the Financial Services and General Government Appropriations bill, which included language protecting six‐day mail delivery, thereby blocking Donahoe's plan. He retired on November 14, 2014.

== Contract with the USPS ==
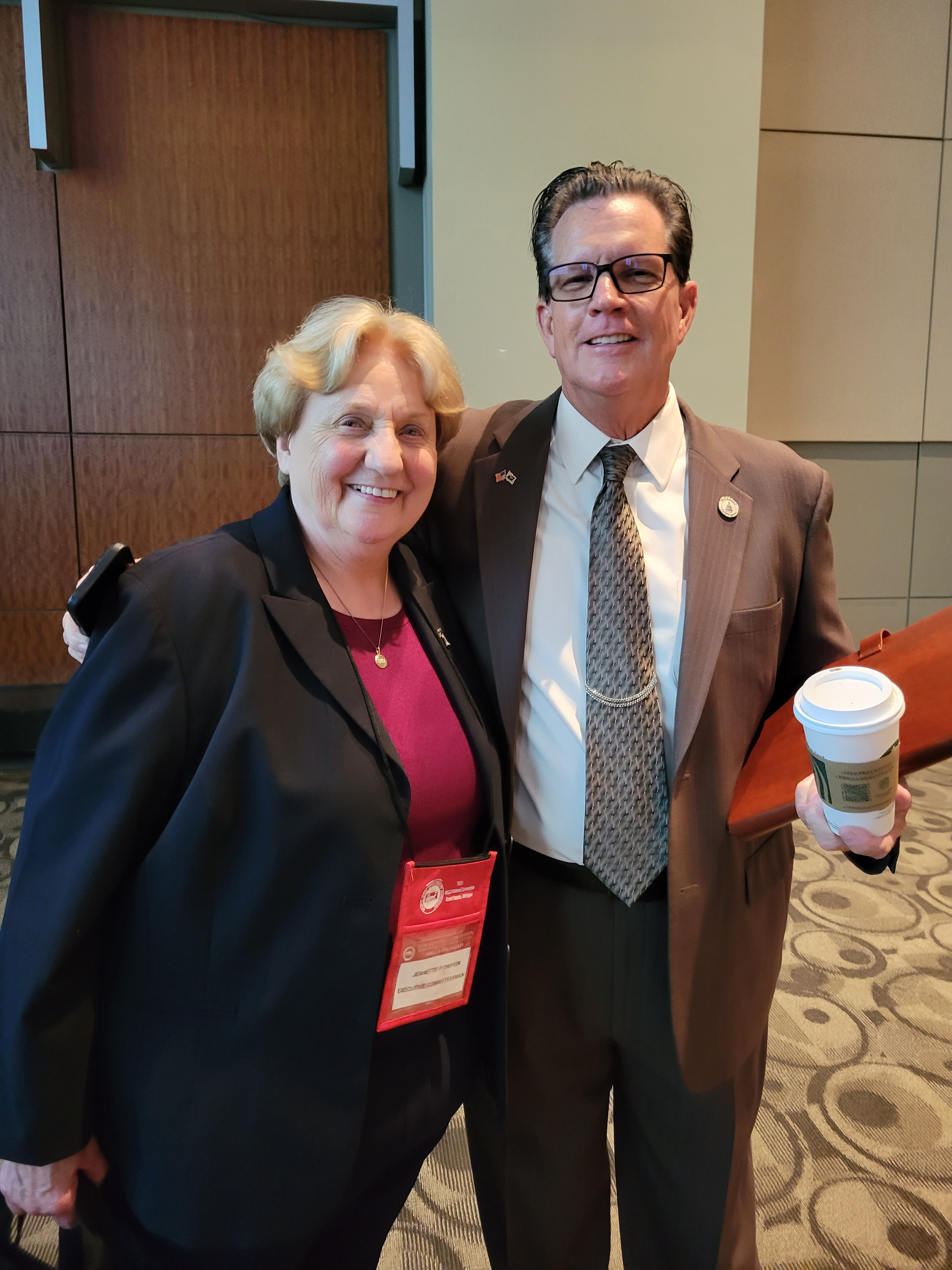
Jeanette Dwyer & Don Maston

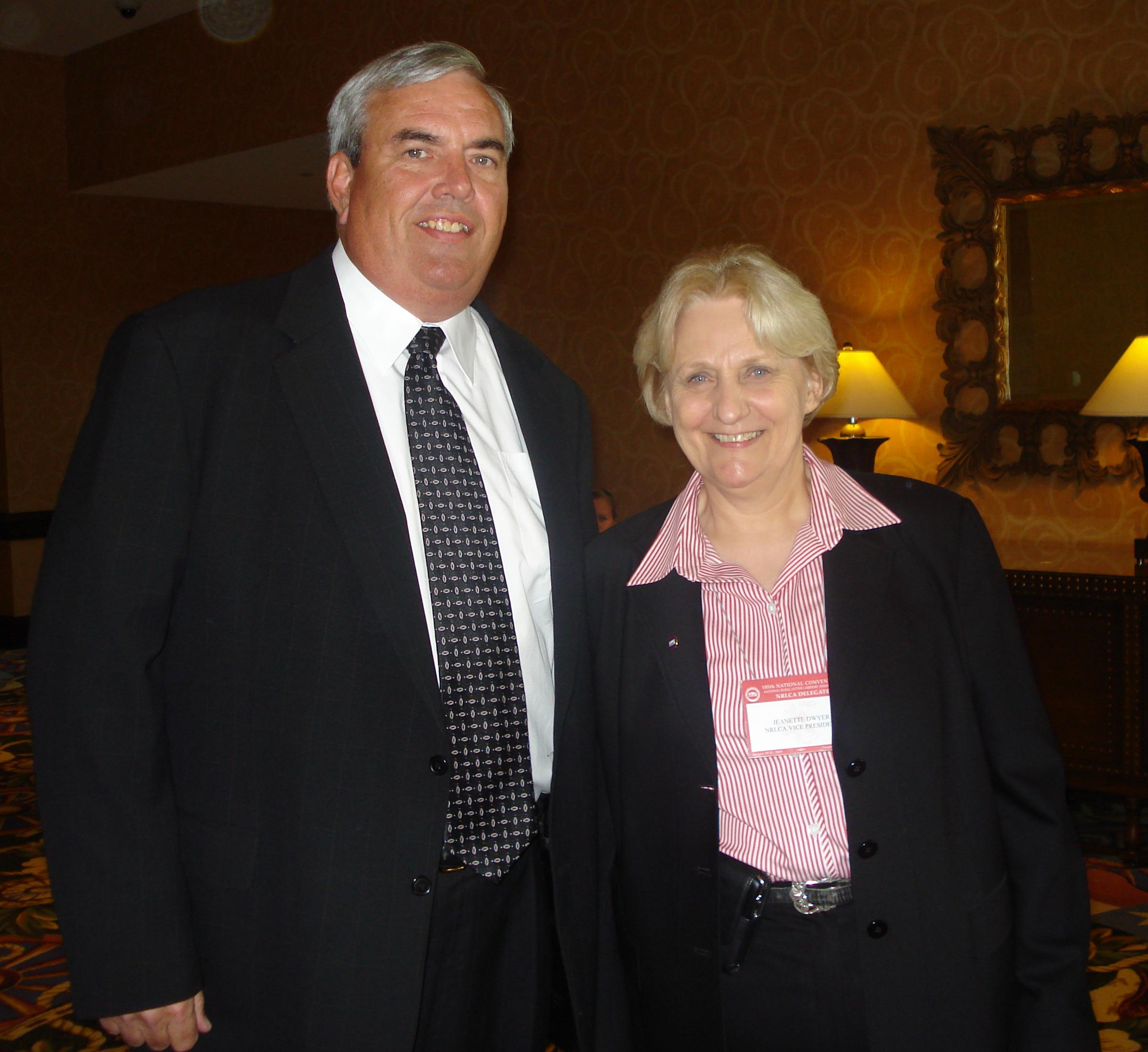
Dwyer & Postmaster John E. Potter

When the 2007 contract between the NRLCA & the USPS expired in 2010, negotiations between the two parties ended in an impasse, and went into third party arbitration. Thus, the rural craft was operating without a contract when Jeanette became president. On July 3, 2012, arbitrator Jack Clarke imposed a new contract upon the NRLCA & USPS that ran through 2015.

Concessions by the NRLCA in the new contract mirrored concessions made by the American Postal Workers Union a year earlier. They included a two-year wage freeze, a two-tiered wage structure and increased health care costs (from 19% to 24%). Substitute rural carriers and RCAs hired under the new contract faced a twenty percent cut in pay with no cost-of-living increases. New hire pay was cut from $19.45 to $15.56 per hour. Despite these concessions, Direct of Labor Relations Joey Johnson voted with the USPS arbitrator to accept the contract.

The first agreement negotiated with the USPS under Jeanette's presidency came in 2016. It includes wage increases for rural carriers for each of the three years it runs, as well as cost of living adjustments, and an increase in equipment maintenance allowance. It is also the first rural carrier contract to grant bereavement leave for employees taking time off for the death of a family member.

== Personal life ==
Jeanette & her husband, Larry, were married in 1970. They have one son, Andy, and one grandson, Bobby.

Preceded by Don Cantrell	NRLCA President; 2011-2018	Succeeded by Ronnie Stutts
