= National Federation of Rural Letter Carriers =

United States Postal Service labor union

- Abbreviation: NFRCL
- Predecessor: National Rural Letter Carriers' Association (split from)
- Merged into: National Association of Letter Carriers
- Successor: National Association of Letter Carriers
- Formation: January 9, 1920
- Founded at: United States
- Dissolved: October 23, 1946
- Type: Labor union
- Legal status: Defunct (merged)
- Purpose: Representing rural letter carriers in the United States Postal Service.
- Location: United States
- Origins: Split from the National Rural Letter Carriers' Association
- Region served: United States
- Services: Labor representation for rural letter carriers
- Fields: Labor relations, postal service
- Members: 300 (in 1925) (1925)
- Parent organization: American Federation of Labor (chartered by)
- Affiliations: American Federation of Labor

The National Federation of Rural Letter Carriers was a labor union representing rural letter carriers in the United States Postal Service.

The union was founded in 1920, as a split from the National Rural Letter Carriers' Association, and on January 9 it was chartered by the American Federation of Labor. By 1925, it had only 300 members. On October 23, 1946, it merged into the National Association of Letter Carriers.
