= Patrick R. Donahoe =

73rd United States Postmaster General

Patrick Donahoe
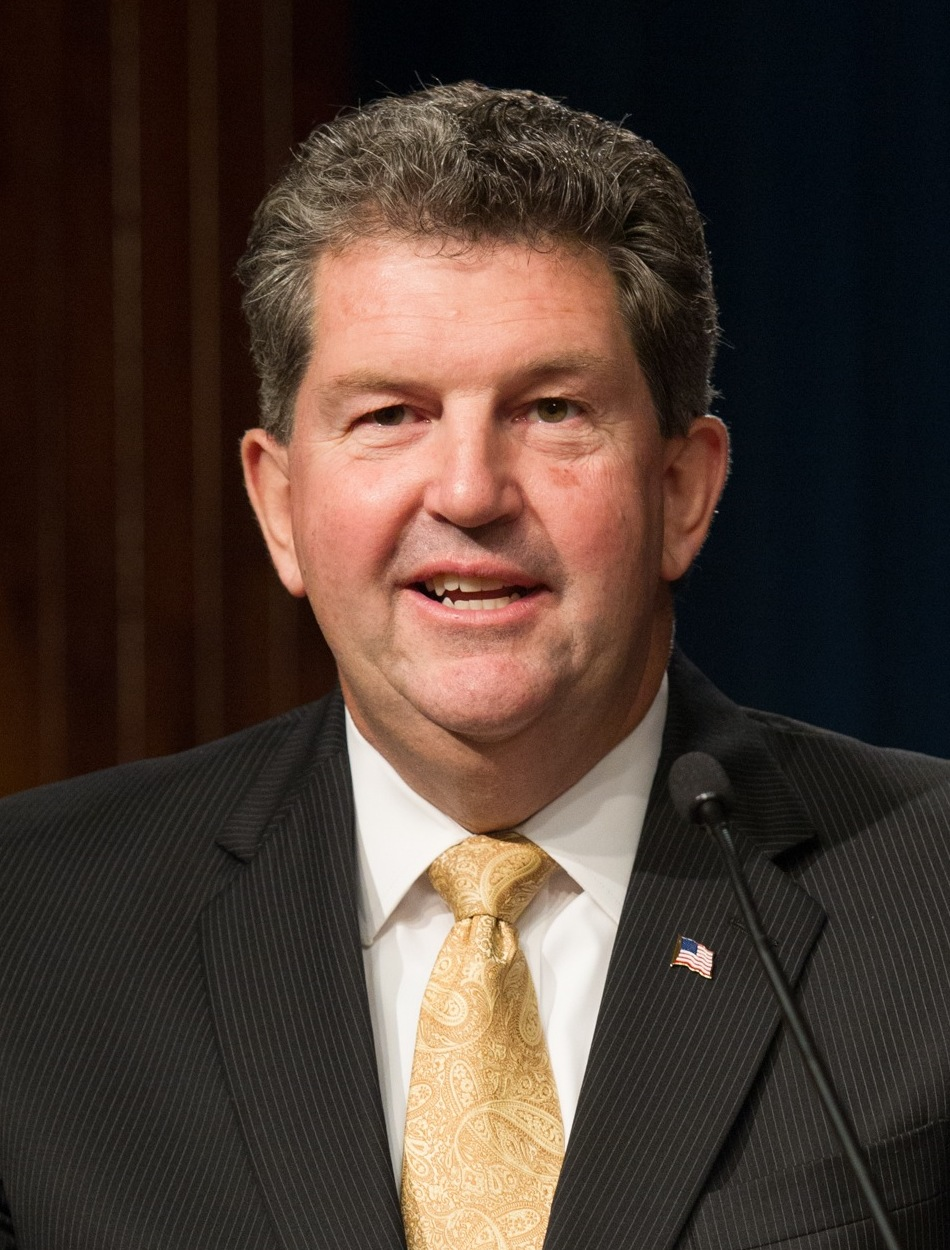
- Donahoe in 2013

73rd United States Postmaster General
- In office December 6, 2010 – February 1, 2015
- President: Barack Obama
- Deputy: Ronald Stroman
- Preceded by: Jack Potter
- Succeeded by: Megan Brennan

Personal details
- Born: October 27, 1955 (age 70) Pittsburgh, Pennsylvania, U.S.
- Education: University of Pittsburgh (BA); Massachusetts Institute of Technology (MBA)

Patrick R. Donahoe (born October 27, 1955) is an American politician who served as the 73rd United States postmaster general, having been appointed to the post on October 25, 2010. A 35-year veteran of the Postal Service, he reported to the Postal Service Board of Governors.

== Biography ==
The eldest of three children of John L. and Joan (Burke) Donahoe, Patrick's parents were workers at the General Motors Fisher Body Plant, a Pittsburgh car factory. Mr Donahoe is a 1977 graduate of the University of Pittsburgh where he majored in economics. He also graduated from the MIT Sloan School of Management, where he was a Sloan Fellow. Before being postmaster, Donahoe served as the 19th deputy postmaster general.

He entered the United States Postal Service as a clerk in Pittsburgh, Pennsylvania, on the advice of his uncle Bob Burke, a mail carrier, who encouraged young Patrick to take the postal service exam.

His predecessor, Postmaster General John E. Potter, testified before the Senate that if the Postal Service is not able to readjust their payment toward the pre-funding of retiree health benefits, as mandated by the Postal Accountability and Enhancement Act of 2006, the USPS would be forced to consider cutting delivery to five days per week during the summer months of June, July, and August. Donahoe echoed his predecessor's views on five-day delivery when he assumed office in 2011.

On February 6, 2013, Donahoe announced that the Postal Service would implement five-day mail delivery beginning August 5, a move he claimed would save $2 billion annually. Later the same day, the national board of the postal union, the National Rural Letter Carriers' Association, voted unanimously to call for his dismissal. July 16, the House passed the Financial Services and General Government Appropriations bill, which included language protecting six‐day mail delivery, thereby blocking Donahoe's plan.

Donahoe retired on February 1, 2015 and Megan Brennan, the first female Postmaster General, was appointed as his successor the following February.

Donahoe is married and has two children and two grandchildren. He is of Irish and Slovak descent. He started collecting postage stamps at the age of 12. After his retirement from the Postal Service, Donahoe now serves on the board of SG360°, a marketing firm. Donahoe also serves as board chairman for Postal Realty Trust, a NYSE listed company which is the largest owner of properties leased to the US Postal Service.

Government offices
Preceded by John E. Potter	United States Postmaster General; 2010–2015	Succeeded by Megan Brennan
