= National Postal Mail Handlers Union =

American labor union

- Headquarters: Washington, D.C.
- Location: United States
- Members: 41,614 (2024)
- Key people: Paul V. Hogrogian, President; Kevin P. Tabarus, Secretary/Treasurer; Katie Maddocks, Legislative and Political Director
- Parent organization: LIUNA
- Affiliations: AFL–CIO
- Website: npmhu.org

The National Postal Mail Handlers Union (NPMHU) is a labor union representing more than 41,000 mail handler craft members in United States Postal Service facilities across the United States. The union has an additional 82,978 associate members, including retirees and federal employees who join primarily to enroll in the Mail Handlers Benefit Plan (MHBP), which offers various health insurance options.

== History ==
The union was founded in New Jersey on August 7, 1912, as the National Association of Postal Mail Laborers of the United States, representing guards and messengers in addition to laborers. By 1925, the union had 1,023 members. In 1937, it was chartered by the American Federation of Labor, as the National Association of Post Office and Railway Mail Laborers.

The union renamed itself as the National Association of Postal Mail Handlers in 1947. It transferred to the new AFL-CIO in 1955, and by 1957 had grown to 9,000 members. Also in 1955, it lengthened its name, to become the National Association of Post Office and Postal Transportation Service Mail Handlers, Watchmen and Messengers. On May 14, 1968, with 32,800 members, it merged into the Laborers' International Union of North America.

== Purpose ==
The NPMHU is a national organization of employees dedicated to advancing the interests of its members and their families. The primary purpose of the union is to negotiate and enforce a National Agreement with the U.S. Postal Service, a contract that establishes wages, cost-of-living adjustments and other pay increases, working conditions, and fringe benefits for all workers within its jurisdiction. The Union also protects workers’ rights by representing them in day-to-day problems on the job, like discipline, violations of seniority, discrimination, or other management abuse, and addresses such work-place concerns as safety, health, and the impact of technological change.

== Governance ==
Mail Handler members belong to a local union, with jurisdiction in their city, town, or area. Locals elect their own officers and conduct their own day-to-day business. They negotiate a Local Memorandum of Understanding to supplement the National Agreement on certain local concerns.

Nationally, NPMHU has its headquarters in Washington, D.C., to administer the Union and to implement programs and policies mandated by the Constitution and the National Executive Board. The national resident officers include the National President and the National Secretary-Treasurer.

== Affiliations ==
The NPMHU is a division of the Laborers' International Union of North America, both of which are members of the AFL-CIO federation. The Mail Handlers are also affiliated with the Communications International Union and the Postal Employees Relief Fund.

== S. 1507 ==
On Thursday, July 30, 2009, the Senate Homeland Security and Governmental Affairs Committee voted 12–1 in favor of S. 1507 (Postal Service Retiree Health Benefits Funding Reform Act of 2009), which would provide financial relief to the Postal Service. An amendment, offered by Sen. Tom Coburn (R-OK), requiring the arbitrator to take into consideration the financial health of the Postal Service when deciding Postal Union contracts, was added prior to its passage. Sen. Joe Lieberman (ID-CT), chairman of the Senate Committee on Homeland Security and Government Affairs, and Sen. Tom Carper (D-DE), chairman of the subcommittee on Federal Financial Management, Government information, Federal Services and International Security, supported the amendment, and voted with committee Republicans for its adoption. The American Postal Workers Union, the National Association of Letter Carriers, the National Rural Letter Carriers' Association and the NPMHU have all voiced opposition to S. 1507 with the inclusion of the arbitrator amendment.

== Presidents ==
- Charles E. Gibson
- c.1940: Harold McAvoy
- Lonnie Johnson
- William H. Quinn
- John F. Hegarty
- Paul V. Hogrogian

== See also ==
- United States Postal Service
- National Rural Letter Carriers' Association
- National Association of Letter Carriers
