= Megan Brennan =

American government official

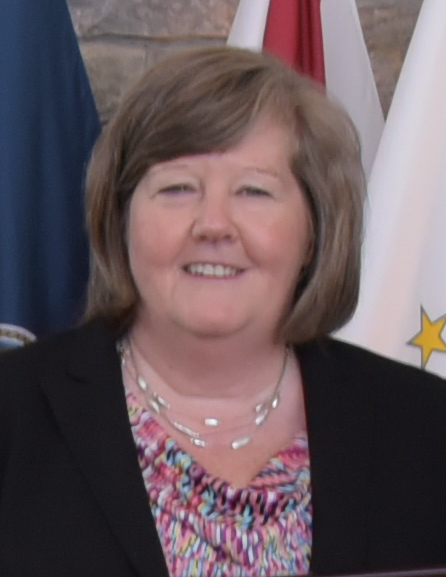
- Brennan in 2015

74th United States Postmaster General
- In office February 1, 2015 – June 15, 2020
- President: Barack Obama; Donald Trump
- Deputy: Ronald Stroman
- Preceded by: Patrick Donahoe
- Succeeded by: Louis DeJoy

Personal details
- Born: c. 1962 (age 62–63) Pottsville, Pennsylvania, U.S.
- Party: Democratic
- Education: Immaculata University (BA); Massachusetts Institute of Technology (MBA)

Megan Jane Brennan (born c. 1962) served as the seventy-fourth postmaster general of the United States. Brennan became the first woman to hold the office when she assumed the position on February 1, 2015.

== Early life and education ==
A native of Pottsville, Pennsylvania, Brennan was one of seven children and attended Nativity BVM High School there, where she played softball and basketball and was on the 1978 state championship basketball team. She was the fourth basketball player at Nativity BVM High School ever to score 1,000 points, and was a co-captain of the basketball team. After graduating in 1980, she attended Immaculata College near Philadelphia, graduating in 1984 with a B.A. in history. Brennan is of Irish descent.

Brennan earned an MBA from the MIT Sloan School of Management in 2003.

== Career ==
She began her career with the U.S. Postal Service (USPS) in 1986 as a letter carrier in Lancaster, Pennsylvania. She subsequently worked as a delivery and collection supervisor, a processing plant manager in Reading and the Lehigh Valley in Pennsylvania, and a district manager in Springfield, Massachusetts.

Brennan stepped away from the USPS for a year to study as a Sloan Fellow at the Massachusetts Institute of Technology. Following that hiatus, she served as manager of field support and integration and manager of operations support for the Northeast area. In May 2005 she was named vice president for the Northeast area, where she coordinated and integrated processing and distribution, transportation and delivery operations in that region.

Brennan was then named vice president of Eastern Area Operations, putting her in charge of postal operations in the states of Pennsylvania, Ohio, West Virginia, Delaware, Kentucky, Central and South Jersey, Western New York and parts of Virginia and Indiana. In December 2010, she was named chief operating officer and executive vice president of the USPS. In 2012, she began shutting down mail-handling facilities because of budget cuts brought on by less mail and congressionally-mandated pension-funding rules.

On November 14, 2014, the U.S. Postal Service's Board of Governors voted to appoint Brennan postmaster general to succeed Patrick R. Donahoe, who was set to retire in February 2015.

In May 2018, the Washington Post reported that President Trump personally pushed her to double the rates on Amazon and other firms.

On October 16, 2019, Brennan announced in a statement that she would be retiring upon fulfilling her five-year commitment as Postmaster General. However, on January 6, her retirement was delayed until a successor could be found.

== Awards and honors ==
In 2022, Brennan was inducted into the Pennsylvania Sports Hall of Fame’s Allen Rogowicz Chapter.

On April 27, 2024, Nativity BVM High School, from which Brennan graduated in 1980, inducted her into its Society of the Golden Cross.

== Family ==
One of Brennan's brothers worked in their hometown Pottsville post office until he died in 2013.

Government offices
Preceded by Patrick Donahoe	United States Postmaster General; 2015–2020	Succeeded by Louis DeJoy
