= List of people from Wheeling, West Virginia =

This is a list of people who were born in, lived in, or are closely associated with the city of Wheeling, West Virginia.

== Athletics ==
- John Bluem, soccer player and coach
- Jesse Burkett, Hall of Fame baseball player
- Gene Freese, baseball player
- Jack Glasscock, Major League Baseball player
- Michael Grove, baseball player
- Chuck Howley, NFL linebacker for Chicago Bears and Dallas Cowboys
- Eugene Lamone, former NFL player, West Virginia Sports Hall of Fame
- Bill Mazeroski, Hall of Fame second baseman
- Cy Morgan, Major League Baseball pitcher
- Joe Pettini, former shortstop for the San Francisco Giants
- Mark Prosser, college basketball coach
- Andy Tonkovich, basketball player selected first in the 1948 BAA draft
- Dave Wojcik, college basketball coach
- Doug Wojcik, college basketball coach

== Arts and entertainment ==
- Jodi Applegate, TV news anchor
- Leon "Chu" Berry, jazz saxophonist
- Leo Brady, playwright, novelist, and director
- Bobby Campo, actor
- Jack Canfield, motivational speaker
- John Corbett, actor
- Billy Cox, bassist
- Jesse Cox, internet personality
- Henrietta Crosman, actress
- Belle Caldwell Culbertson, author and philanthropist
- Faith Daniels, network broadcaster
- Rebecca Harding Davis, author
- Joyce DeWitt, actress
- Joanne Dru, actress
- Doug Fetherling, writer
- Mike Florio, sportswriter
- Kelsey Fowler, Broadway actress
- Virginia Fox, actress
- Rob Garrison, actor
- Lois Kibbee, actress
- Everett Lee, orchestral conductor
- Slim Lehart, country music singer
- Keith Maillard, writer
- Harry Nickerson, criminal and murderer
- Mollie O'Brien, Grammy-winning bluegrass singer
- Tim O'Brien, Grammy-winning bluegrass musician, brother of Mollie O'Brien
- Rick Schneider-Calabash, animation producer, writer, and director
- Eleanor Steber, operatic soprano associated with Metropolitan Opera
- Chris Stirewalt, digital politics editor for NewsNation
- Edith Lake Wilkinson (1868–1957), artist
- Nan Wynn, big band singer and actress

== Politics ==
- Thais Blatnik, West Virginia journalist and politician
- Joseph M. Devine, governor of North Dakota, 1898–1899
- Christine Hamm, member of the New Hampshire House of Representatives
- Bob Ney, U.S. representative from Ohio

== Other ==
- Derrick Anderson, lieutenant colonel
- Adelbert R. Buffington, U.S. Army general
- William Burrus, president of APWU 2001–2010
- Annie Sinclair Cunningham (1832–1897), religious worker, Wheeling Hall of Fame
- William L. Elkins, 19th-century business tycoon
- Walter L. Fisher, U.S. secretary of the interior
- Rosemary Front, disability rights advocate
- Cynthia Germanotta, philanthropist and businesswoman, mother of Lady Gaga
- George Herbig, astronomer
- Alvan Macauley, president of Packard 1916–1939
- William J. Mitsch, Stockholm Water Prize laureate, ecology professor and author
- Marion Moses, physician, labor activist
- Bob Nutting and family, principal owners of the Pittsburgh Pirates
- Ewald Over, entrepreneur and American Civil War veteran
- Austin E. Renforth, major general, USMC
- Jesse L. Reno, Civil War general; namesake of Reno, Nevada
- Walter Reuther, president of United Auto Workers 1946–1970 and Congress of Industrial Organizations 1952–1955
- Robert E. L. Strider, president of Colby College
- John Yarnall, naval officer during War of 1812

== See also ==
- List of mayors of Wheeling, West Virginia
