= Manual Enterprises, Inc. v. Day =

MANual Enterprises, Inc. v. Day
- Supreme Court of the United States

Argued February 26–27, 1962 Decided June 25, 1962
- Full case name: MANual Enterprises, Inc., et al. v. J. Edward Day, United States Postmaster General
- Citations: 370 U.S. 478 (more) 82 S. Ct. 1432; 8 L. Ed. 2d 639; 1962 U.S. LEXIS 2163

Case history
- Prior: 289 F.2d 455 (D.C. Cir. 1961); cert. granted, 368 U.S. 809 (1961).

Holding
- Photographs of nude, or near-nude, male models are not "obscene" within the meaning of 18 U.S.C. § 1461.

Court membership
- Chief Justice Earl Warren Associate Justices Hugo Black · Felix Frankfurter; William O. Douglas · Tom C. Clark; John M. Harlan II · William J. Brennan Jr. Potter Stewart · Byron White

Case opinions
- Plurality: Harlan, joined by Stewart
- Concurrence: Black
- Concurrence: Brennan, joined by Warren, Douglas
- Dissent: Clark
- Frankfurter took no part in the decision. White took no part in the consideration or decision of the case.

Laws applied
- First Amendment, 18 U.S.C. § 1461

MANual Enterprises, Inc. v. Day, 370 U.S. 478 (1962), is a decision by the Supreme Court of the United States in which the Court held that magazines consisting largely of photographs of nude or near-nude male models are not considered "obscene" within the meaning of 18 U.S.C. § 1461, which prohibits the mailing of obscene material. It was the first case in which the Court engaged in plenary review of a Post Office Department order holding obscene matter "nonmailable".

The case is notable for its ruling that photographs of nude men are not obscene, an implication which opened the U.S. mail to nude male pornographic magazines, especially those catering to gay men.

== Background ==
H. Lynn Womack of Washington, D.C., was the publisher of several major physique magazines beginning in the late 1950s. Physique magazines, a genre which existed largely from the early 1950s until the mid 1960s, featured photos of nude or partially nude young men. They operated under the alibi of being for exercise enthusiasts or art students, but it was generally well understood that they were actually produced for and mostly read by gay men. Physique publishers and photographers frequently faced legal troubles, particularly from postal inspectors, who vigorously enforced the Comstock laws' prohibitions against transmitting obscene materials through the mail. Womack's case was the first involving the physique trade (or any sort of gay content) to reach the Supreme Court.

On March 25, 1960, the postmaster in Alexandria, Virginia, seized six parcels containing 405 copies of three physique magazines published by Womack: MANual, Trim, and Grecian Guild Pictorial. After an evidentiary hearing, the Judicial Officer of the Post Office Department found that the magazines were aimed at and primarily read by homosexual men, and that they would appeal to their "prurient interest" (but would not appeal to "sexually normal individuals"). These facts were largely accepted by both parties. The Judicial Officer concluded the magazines were obscene and therefore "nonmailable."

Womack sued in federal district court for injunctive relief. However, the government moved for summary judgment. The district court granted the motion and sustained the administrative ruling.

At each step, the magazines were found to be nonmailable for two reasons: that they contained obscene content, and that they included advertisements that enabled customers to procure obscene materials. While Womack's magazines did not include frontal nudity, a postal inspector testified that by sending away to a photography studio advertised in the pages of one of the magazines, he received photographs that exposed the "pubic area" of nude men. Investigators also found photographs of nude men "engaged in homosexual activities" at such studios.

Womack appealed to United States Court of Appeals for the District of Columbia Circuit. On February 13, 1961, the court of appeals affirmed the district court's ruling.

Womack appealed to the U.S. Supreme Court, which granted certiorari on October 9, 1961.

== Decision ==
The MANual Enterprises Court was significantly divided. Since the 1957 decision in Roth v. United States, 354 U.S. 476 (1957), the Court had struggled to define and refine its approach to obscenity. The widely divergent opinions in MANual Enterprises may reflect those divisions.

The majority opinion was written by Justice John Marshall Harlan II, and joined by Justice Potter Stewart. Justice Hugo Black, who took an absolutist approach to First Amendment jurisprudence, concurred in the result but did not join the opinion. Justice Black did not issue an opinion of his own.

Justice William Brennan, joined by Chief Justice Earl Warren and Justice William O. Douglas, concurred but would have decided the case on much narrower technical rather than First Amendment grounds.

Only Justice Tom C. Clark dissented, stating "Since in my view the Postmaster General is required by § 1461 to reject nonmailable matter, I would affirm the judgment on the sole ground that the magazines contain information as to where obscene material can be obtained and thus are nonmailable."

=== Majority opinion ===
Writing for the majority, Justice Harlan crafted a revision of the Court's view of what constituted obscenity. Both lower courts had argued that the intended audience of the magazines (homosexuals) rendered the material obscene.

Harlan focused on whether the materials were "so offensive on their face as to affront current community standards of decency — a quality that we shall hereafter refer to as 'patent offensiveness' or 'indecency.' " If the materials lacked that quality, Harlan reasoned that the Court need not consider the question of "audience."

Reaching back to the Hicklin test, Harlan argued that for materials to be obscene requires two distinct elements: patent offensiveness and an appeal to prurient interest.

Therefore, Harlan concluded, "The Court of Appeals was mistaken in considering that Roth made 'prurient interest' appeal the sole test of obscenity."

Harlan then approached the Roth standard which required a determination of the relevant "community." Harlan concluded that since the law in question dealt with the national mail, the relevant community was national.

But Harlan struggled to define "prurient appeal." In the end, Harlan merely asserted that the materials were constitutionally protected. "[We] need go no further in the present case than to hold that the magazines in question, taken as a whole, cannot, under any permissible constitutional standard, be deemed to be beyond the pale of contemporary notions of rudimentary decency." In part, Harlan reached this conclusion because the majority believed that the government had overemphasized parts of the materials without taking them as a whole (a significant part of the Roth test).

But more importantly, the majority found that portrayal of the male nude (and, implicitly, portrayal of the homosexual male nude) "cannot fairly be regarded as more objectionable than many portrayals of the female nude that society tolerates."

Anticipating a series of cases yet to come, Harlan addressed whether the materials had been rendered obscene by the way in which they were advertised. Section 1461 said that advertising could render materials obscene, and Chief Justice Earl Warren (concurring in Roth) had agreed on constitutional grounds. But Harlan, writing for the majority, concluded that the government had not argued that the advertising made the materials obscene. Section 1461, Harlan noted, did not require scienter, and to impose the requirement that publisher investigate every advertiser in their pages would impose an unconstitutional chilling effect on free speech.

Consequently, the majority reversed.

=== Concurrence ===
Justice Brennan concurred in the result. Brennan's concurrence turned on narrow technical grounds, however. Brennan noted that the Post Office Department General Counsel had initially refused to even hold a formal hearing, wishing to seize the materials without giving Womack a chance for rebuttal. The Post Office Department reversed itself a short time later, and a formal hearing was held.

For Brennan, the Post Office Department's entire process raised significant constitutional questions.

We risk erosion of First Amendment liberties unless we train our vigilance upon the methods whereby obscenity is condemned no less than upon the standards whereby it is judged. Questions of procedural safeguards loom large in the wake of an order such as the one before us. Among them are: (a) whether Congress can close the mails to obscenity by any means other than prosecution of its sender; (b) whether Congress, if it can authorize exclusion of mail, can provide that obscenity be determined in the first instance in any forum except a court, and (c) whether, even if Congress could so authorize administrative censorship, it has in fact conferred upon postal authorities any power to exclude matter from the mails upon their determination of its obscene character.

For Brennan, this issue surpassed "even the important issue of the standards for judging this material's" obscenity in importance.

Brennan, however, found no provision in Section 1461 supporting the establishment of an administrative procedure to censor the mails. Brennan provided a lengthy analysis (including extensive quotations) of the section's legislative history. Based on that evidence, Brennan concluded that there were only two possible constructions of Section 1461: That postmasters could remove matter which they thought, on the face of it, to be obscene, or that postmasters could remove matter only to turn it over to the appropriate authorities. The first construction was constitutionally infirm, Brennan argued. The Post Office Department had not acted in accordance with the second construction. Thus, either way, the Post Office Department's seizure of the magazines, its subsequent investigation of the advertisers, its discovery of allegedly obscene materials at each advertiser's place of business, and additional outcomes of its investigation did not withstand constitutional or statutory scrutiny.

Administrative censorship of the mail, Brennan concluded, was not in itself unconstitutional. A variety of means were at the government's disposal, including recently enacted provisions to return the items, deny the use of postal banks, refund of monies collected, and more. None of these remedies seize the materials or make a judgment about their obscene nature. "But the suggestion that Congress may constitutionally authorize any process other than a fully judicial one immediately raises the gravest doubts."

=== Dissent ===
Justice Clark dissented. Clark would have affirmed the judgment of the district court on the grounds that the magazines contained information about where obscene material could be obtained. Therefore, they were nonmailable and constitutionally seized.

Clark rejected Brennan's analysis because the government's authority under Section 1461 was not presented or argued by either the plaintiff or respondent, and thus was not before the Court. Nevertheless, Clark addressed the concurring opinion's analysis. Clark, however, concluded that the legislative history of Section 1461 clearly permitted postmasters to refuse mailed materials which were known to be obscene. Since subsequent investigation by the Post Office Department had confirmed that the advertisers in the magazine sold obscene materials, the materials published by Womack could be seized. For the dissent, the fact that postal regulations had been in existence since 1902 without challenge weighed heavily in favor of this interpretation of the legislative history.

Regarding the majority opinion, Clark concluded that Congress had addressed the issue of scienter in the statute. In Section 1461, Congress made it clear that the act of mailing materials implied scienter: "Whoever knowingly uses the mails for the mailing, carriage in the mails, or delivery of anything declared by this section to be nonmailable . . . shall be fined not more than $5,000 or imprisoned not more than five years, or both . . . ."

For these reasons, Clark would have affirmed the judgment of the district court.

== Note about Court composition ==
Justice Felix Frankfurter suffered a stroke several months after hearing oral argument in the case; he did not participate in the decision. Frankfurter resigned from the Court on August 28, 1962.

Justice Charles Evans Whittaker had suffered a nervous breakdown prior to oral argument in the case. By the time of the decision, he was no longer on the Court. His successor, Justice Byron White, was confirmed to the Court after oral argument in the case occurred; he did not participate in either its consideration or the decision.

== See also ==
- List of United States Supreme Court cases, volume 370
- One, Inc. v. Olesen
- List of LGBTQ-related cases in the United States Supreme Court
