= Emmet Andrews =

American labor union leader

Emmet Charles Andrews (August 3, 1916 – November 8, 1981) was an American labor union leader.

Born in San Francisco, Andrews worked as a clerk for the United States Post Office from 1936, and joined the National Federation of Post Office Clerks. He served as secretary of his local union from 1938, and later as president. In 1955, he was elected as a vice-president of the national union, and from 1962 he held the post full-time.

In 1966, Andrews moved to Washington, D.C. to serve as an executive aid for the union. In 1971, the union merged into the new American Postal Workers' Union, and Andrews became an administrative aid for the clerks craft, then in 1972 became the union's industrial relations director. In 1977, he was appointed as the union's president, and he won election on a permanent basis the following year. As leader of the union, he pledged to prioritize reducing deliveries to five days a week. He negotiated a new contract, but unhappiness with this led him to lose a bid for re-election in 1980. From 1978, he also served on the executive of the AFL-CIO, serving until his resignation in 1981. He died later in the year.

Trade union offices
Preceded by Francis S. Filbey	President of the American Postal Workers' Union; 1977–1980	Succeeded by Moe Biller
