= NPTA =

NPTA may refer to:

- United States National Parent Teacher Association
- National Postal Transport Association
- National Paper Trade Association
- National Progressive Taekwondo Association
- National Property Taxpayers Association
