= Francis S. Filbey =

Labor union leader

Francis Stuart "Stu" Filbey (July 4, 1907 – May 17, 1977) was an American labor union leader.

Born in Wrightsville, Pennsylvania, Filbey grew up in Baltimore, and was educated at the Baltimore Polytechnic Institute. He became a clerk working for the United States Post Office, and in 1936, he joined the National Federation of Post Office Clerks (NFPOC). He served as president of his local union, and then in 1954 as a vice-president of the national union, also becoming president of the Baltimore Federation of Labor. From 1959, he was president of the Metropolitan Baltimore Council of the AFL-CIO.

In 1962, Filbey became a full-time administrative aid for the United Federation of Postal Clerks, successor of the NFPOC. He was elected as president of the union in 1969, in which role he negotiated a merger with several other postal unions, forming the American Postal Workers' Union. He became president of the new union, and from 1974 also served on the executive of the AFL-CIO. He died in 1977, while still in office.

Trade union offices
Preceded by Roy Hallbeck	President of the United Federation of Postal Clerks; 1969–1971	Succeeded by Union merged
Preceded by Union founded	President of the American Postal Workers' Union; 1971–1977	Succeeded by Emmet Andrews
