= Moe Biller =

American union leader

Morris "Moe" Biller (November 5, 1915 – September 5, 2003) was an American labor union leader.

Born in Manhattan, Biller was educated at Seward Park High School, Brooklyn College and City College, before in 1937 becoming a substitute post office clerk. Within days, he was fired for a mistake which he had not made, but managed to secure his reinstatement. This experience inspired him to join the National Federation of Post Office Clerks, and he managed to negotiate sick pay for workers at his office.

During World War II, Biller served in the Army Adjutant General Corps, then in 1945 he returned to his job. He gradually rose to prominent in the union, becoming president of his local in 1959. In 1970, members of the National Association of Letter Carriers in New York launched the U.S. postal strike of 1970. This was the first major strike of postal workers in the United States, given that they were legally barred from taking strike action. Biller ruled that members of his union should not cross the letter carriers' picket lines, and in this way, he came to national prominence. The strike ended after eight days, and led to major gains for post office workers.

In 1971, the clerks' union merged into the new American Postal Workers' Union, and Biller was appointed as its north east regional co-ordinator. He backed a four-day strike of workers at a mail center in New Jersey in 1974, and organized demonstrations aimed to bolster workers' position during contract negotiations in 1978.

Biller was elected as president of the union in 1980, in which role he negotiated several contracts which led to increased wages for members. He worked closely with the letter carriers, and he successfully campaigned against Sears Roebuck being permitted to handle some post office business. He retired in 2001, and died two years later.

Trade union offices
Preceded by Emmet Andrews	President of the American Postal Workers' Union; 1980–2001	Succeeded by Bill Burrus
