= National Postal Transport Association =

The National Postal Transport Association (NPTA) was a labor union representing workers in the Postal Transportation Service in the United States.

The union was founded in 1898 as The National Association of Railway Postal Clerks, and was chartered under the laws of New Hampshire as a fraternal beneficiary association. In 1904 the name was changed to the Railway Mail Association. A section of the union split away in 1911, to form the Brotherhood of Railway Postal Clerks. In 1917, the union was chartered by the American Federation of Labor, and in 1919 it absorbed the railway postal clerk section of the National Federation of Postal Employees.

On October 1, 1949, the Post Office Department renamed the Railway Mail Service as Postal Transportation Service, and that led the union to become the NPTA. on October 1, 1949. In 1961, the NPTA merged with the National Federation of Post Office Clerks (NFPOC) and the United National Association of Post Office Clerks (UNAPOC) to form the 115,000-member United Federation of Postal Clerks (UFPC).

The Railway Mail Mutual Benefit Association, (MBA) traces its origins to 1874. It was established to provide compensation to clerks in case of injury or death while working, since commercial life insurance was not available to Railway Post Office clerks due to hazardous working conditions. It is now named the American Postal Workers Union (APWU) Accident Benefit Association. Its current mailing address is PO Box 538, Portsmouth, New Hampshire 03802-0538.
