= National Association of Special Delivery Messengers =

- Dissolved: 1971
- Type: Trade union

The National Association of Special Delivery Messengers (SDM) was a labor union representing United States Postal Service workers.

The union was founded in 1932, and was chartered by the American Federation of Labor in 1937. It transferred to the new AFL-CIO in 1955, and by 1957, it had 2,000 members. This grew slightly to 2,605 members in 1970.

On July 1, 1971, the union merged with the United Federation of Postal Clerks, the National Postal Union, the National Association of Post Office and General Service Maintenance Employees, and the National Federation of Post Office Motor Vehicle Employees, to form the American Postal Workers' Union.
