= Postal Reorganization Act =

1970 U.S. federal law, created the U.S. Postal Service

- Long title: An act to improve and modernize the postal service, to reorganize the Post Office Department, and for other purposes.
- Enacted by: the 91st United States Congress

Citations
- Public law: Pub. L. 91–375
- Statutes at Large: 84 Stat. 719

Legislative history
- Introduced in the House as H.R. 17070; Signed into law by President Richard Nixon on August 12, 1970

The Postal Reorganization Act of 1970 was a law passed by the United States Congress that abolished the then U.S. Post Office Department, which was a part of the Cabinet, and created the U.S. Postal Service, a corporation-like independent agency authorized by the U.S. government as an official service for the delivery of mail in the United States. President Richard Nixon signed the Act in law on August 12, 1970.

The legislation was a direct outcome of the U.S. postal strike of 1970. Prior to the act, postal workers were not permitted by law to engage in collective bargaining. In the act, the four major postal unions (National Association of Letter Carriers, American Postal Workers Union, National Postal Mail Handlers Union, and the National Rural Letter Carriers' Association) won full collective bargaining rights: the right to negotiate on wages, benefits and working conditions, although they still were not allowed the right to strike.

The first paragraph of the act reads:

The United States Postal Service shall be operated as a basic and fundamental service provided to the people by the Government of the United States, authorized by the Constitution, created by Act of Congress, and supported by the people. The Postal Service shall have as its basic function the obligation to provide postal services to bind the Nation together through the personal, educational, literary, and business correspondence of the people. It shall provide prompt, reliable, and efficient services to patrons in all areas and shall render postal services to all communities. The costs of establishing and maintaining the Postal Service shall not be apportioned to impair the overall value of such service to the people.

The Postal Reorganization Act exempts the USPS from Freedom of Information Act (FOIA) disclosure of "information of a commercial nature, including trade secrets, whether or not obtained from a person outside the Postal Service, which under good business practice would not be publicly disclosed".

== See also ==
- Post Office Act of 1872
- Postal Service Act
