= One, Inc. v. Olesen =

- Supreme Court of the United States

Submitted June 13, 1957 Decided January 13, 1958
- Full case name: One, Incorporated, v. Otto K. Olesen, Postmaster of the City of Los Angeles
- Citations: 355 U.S. 371 (more) 78 S. Ct. 364; 2 L. Ed. 2d 352

Case history
- Prior: 241 F.2d 772 (9th Cir. 1957)

Holding
- Pro-homosexual writing is not per se obscene. United States Court of Appeals for the Ninth Circuit reversed.

Court membership
- Chief Justice Earl Warren Associate Justices Hugo Black · Felix Frankfurter; William O. Douglas · Harold H. Burton; Tom C. Clark · John M. Harlan II; William J. Brennan Jr. · Charles E. Whittaker

Case opinion
- Per curiam

Laws applied
- U.S. Const. amend. I; Comstock Act of 1873

One, Inc. v. Olesen, 355 U.S. 371 (1958), is a landmark decision of the US Supreme Court for LGBTQ rights in the United States. It was the first U.S. Supreme Court ruling to deal with homosexuality and the first to address free speech rights with respect to homosexuality. The Supreme Court reversed a lower court ruling that the gay magazine ONE violated obscenity laws, thus upholding constitutional protection for pro-homosexual writing.

== Factual background ==
ONE, Inc. (now One Institute), a spinoff of the Mattachine Society, published the early pro-gay ONE: The Homosexual Magazine beginning in 1953. After a campaign of harassment from the U.S. Post Office Department and the Federal Bureau of Investigation, Los Angeles Postmaster Otto Olesen declared the October 1954 issue "obscene, lewd, lascivious and filthy" and therefore unmailable under the Comstock Act of 1873. In that issue, the Post Office objected to "Sappho Remembered", a story of a lesbian's affection for a twenty-year-old "girl" who gives up her boyfriend to live with her, the lesbian, because it was "lustfully stimulating to the average homosexual reader"; "Lord Samuel and Lord Montagu", a poem about homosexual cruising that it said contained "filthy words"; and (3) an advertisement for The Circle, a magazine containing homosexual pulp romance stories, that would direct the reader to other obscene material.

== Procedural background ==
The magazine, represented by a young attorney who had authored the cover story in the October 1954 issue, Eric Julber, brought suit in U.S. District Court seeking an injunction against the Postmaster. In March 1956, U.S. District Judge Thurmond Clarke ruled for the defendant. He wrote: "The suggestion advanced that homosexuals should be recognized as a segment of our people and be accorded special privilege as a class is rejected." A three-judge panel of the Ninth Circuit Court of Appeals upheld that decision unanimously in February 1957. Julber filed a petition with the U.S. Supreme Court on June 13, 1957.

== Decision by U.S. Supreme Court ==
On January 13, 1958, the U.S. Supreme Court both accepted the case and, without hearing oral argument, issued a terse per curiam decision reversing the Ninth Circuit. The decision, citing its June 24, 1957, landmark decision in Roth v. United States 354 U.S. 476 (1957), read in its entirety:

241 F.2d 772, reversed.
Eric Julber for petitioner.
Solicitor General Rankin, Acting Assistant Attorney General Leonard and Samuel D. Slade for respondent.
PER CURIAM.
The petition for writ of certiorari is granted and the judgment of the United States Court of Appeals for the Ninth Circuit is reversed. Roth v. United States, 354 U.S. 476.

== Similar decision ==
On the same day, the court issued a similar per curiam decision also citing Roth in Sunshine Book Co. v. Summerfield, which concerned the distribution of two nudist magazines.

== Impact ==
One, Inc. v. Olesen was the first U.S. Supreme Court ruling to deal with homosexuality and the first to address free speech rights with respect to homosexuality. The justices supporting the reversal were Frankfurter, Douglas, Clark, Harlan, and Whittaker. As an affirmation of Roth, the case itself has proved most important for, in the words of one scholar, "its on-the-ground effects. By protecting ONE, the Supreme Court facilitated the flourishing of a gay and lesbian culture and a sense of community" at the same time as the federal government was purging homosexuals from its ranks.

In its next issue, ONE told its readers: "For the first time in American publishing history, a decision binding on every court now stands. ... affirming in effect that it is in no way proper to describe a love affair between two homosexuals as constitut(ing) obscenity."

== See also ==
- List of LGBT-related cases in the United States Supreme Court
