= Cliff Guffey =

American labor union leader (1949–2026)

Clifford Guffey (September 29, 1949 – February 21, 2026) was an American labor union leader.

== Life and career ==
Born in Shawnee, Oklahoma, Guffey moved frequently as a child, as his father was a pilot in the United States Navy. In 1968, he joined the United States Marine Corps and served as a rifleman in the 2nd Battalion, 3rd Marines during the Vietnam War. In 1971, he became a letter carrier in Oklahoma City, then the following year became a letter sorting machine operator, joining the American Postal Workers Union.

In 1979, Guffey was elected as president of Oklahoma City Area Local. He then became assistant director of the union's clerk division in 1986, and director in 1999. In 2001, he was elected as executive vice president of the union, and then as president in 2010. As leader of the union, he prioritized the issues faced by veterans and working families. However, he was criticized by some members for agreeing a new contract which meant new entrants would remain on temporary contracts.

In 2013, he was defeated for re-election by Mark Dimondstein, and he retired fully the following year.

Guffey died on February 21, 2026, at the age of 76.

Trade union offices
Preceded by William Burrus	President of the American Postal Workers Union; 2010–2013	Succeeded by Mark Dimondstein
