= National Association of Post Office and General Services Maintenance Employees =

- Formation: 1937
- Dissolved: 1971
- Type: Trade union

The National Association of Post Office and General Services Maintenance Employees (NAPOGSME) was a labor union representing mechanics working for the United States Postal Service.

The union was founded in 1937, as the National Association of Post Office Mechanics. In 1948, it absorbed the National Association of Post Office Custodial Employees, and became the National Association of Post Office Maintenance Employees. In 1950, some post office staff were transferred to the General Services Administration, and the union then adopted its final name.

On April 1, 1966, the union was chartered by the AFL-CIO, and by 1968, it had about 21,500 members. On July 1, 1971, it merged with the National Association of Special Delivery Messengers, the United Federation of Postal Clerks, the National Federation of Post Office Motor Vehicle Employees, and the National Postal Union, to form the American Postal Workers' Union.
