= Post Office Consolidation Act of 1872 =

- Enacted by: the 42nd United States Congress
- Effective: July 1, 1872

Citations
- Public law: Pub. L. 42–335
- Statutes at Large: 17 Stat. 283

Legislative history
- Introduced in the House as H.R. 1 by John B. Packer on January 9, 1872; Passed the House on March 12, 1872; Passed the Senate on May 31, 1872; Signed into law by President Ulysses Grant on June 8, 1872

The Post Office Consolidation Act of 1872, formally entitled as the Act to revise, consolidate, and amend the Statutes relating to the Post-office Department (17 Stat. 283, enacted June 8, 1872) consolidated the United States Post Office Department into the Cabinet of the United States. It is most notable for a rider enacted under section 148; this was the first provision in what later became known as the Comstock Act of 1873.

The Act consolidated 827 sections of scattered postal laws into one code and introduced other operational standardization. The Act provided the administrative backbone until the next major reorganization occurred, in 1970.

== See also ==
- Postal Service Act
- United States Postal Service
- Postal Reorganization Act
