= United Federation of Postal Clerks =

- Formation: 1961
- Dissolved: 1971
- Type: Labour union
- Location: United States

The United Federation of Postal Clerks (UFPC) was a labor union representing clerks working for the post office in the United States.

== History ==
The union was established on April 17, 1961, with the merger of the National Federation of Post Office Clerks and the United National Association of Post Office Clerks. It was initially named the United Federation of Post Office Clerks, and it was chartered by the AFL-CIO. On July 1, 1961, the union absorbed the National Postal Transport Association, and adopted its final name. On formation, it had 135,000 members.

By 1969, the union had grown to 166,000 members. On July 1, 1971, the union merged with the National Association of Special Delivery Messengers, the National Association of Post Office and General Services Maintenance Employees, the National Federation of Post Office Motor Vehicle Employees, and the National Postal Union, to form the American Postal Workers' Union.

== Leadership ==
=== Presidents ===
1961: Roy Hallbeck
1969: Francis S. Filbey

=== Secretary-Treasurers ===
1961: John F. Bowen
1962: Owen H. Schoon
1969: Jack Love
