= Postal Service Act =

1792 U.S. Federal law establishing the Post Office

- Long title: An Act to establish the Post Office and Post Roads within the United States.
- Enacted by: the 2nd United States Congress

Citations
- Public law: Pub. L. 2–7
- Statutes at Large: 1 Stat. 232, Chap. 7

Legislative history
- Introduced in the House as H.R. 154 by Samuel Livermore (F-NH) on November 29, 1791; Signed into law by President George Washington on February 20, 1792

The Postal Service Act was a piece of United States federal legislation that established the United States Post Office Department. It was signed into law by President George Washington on February 20, 1792.

== History ==
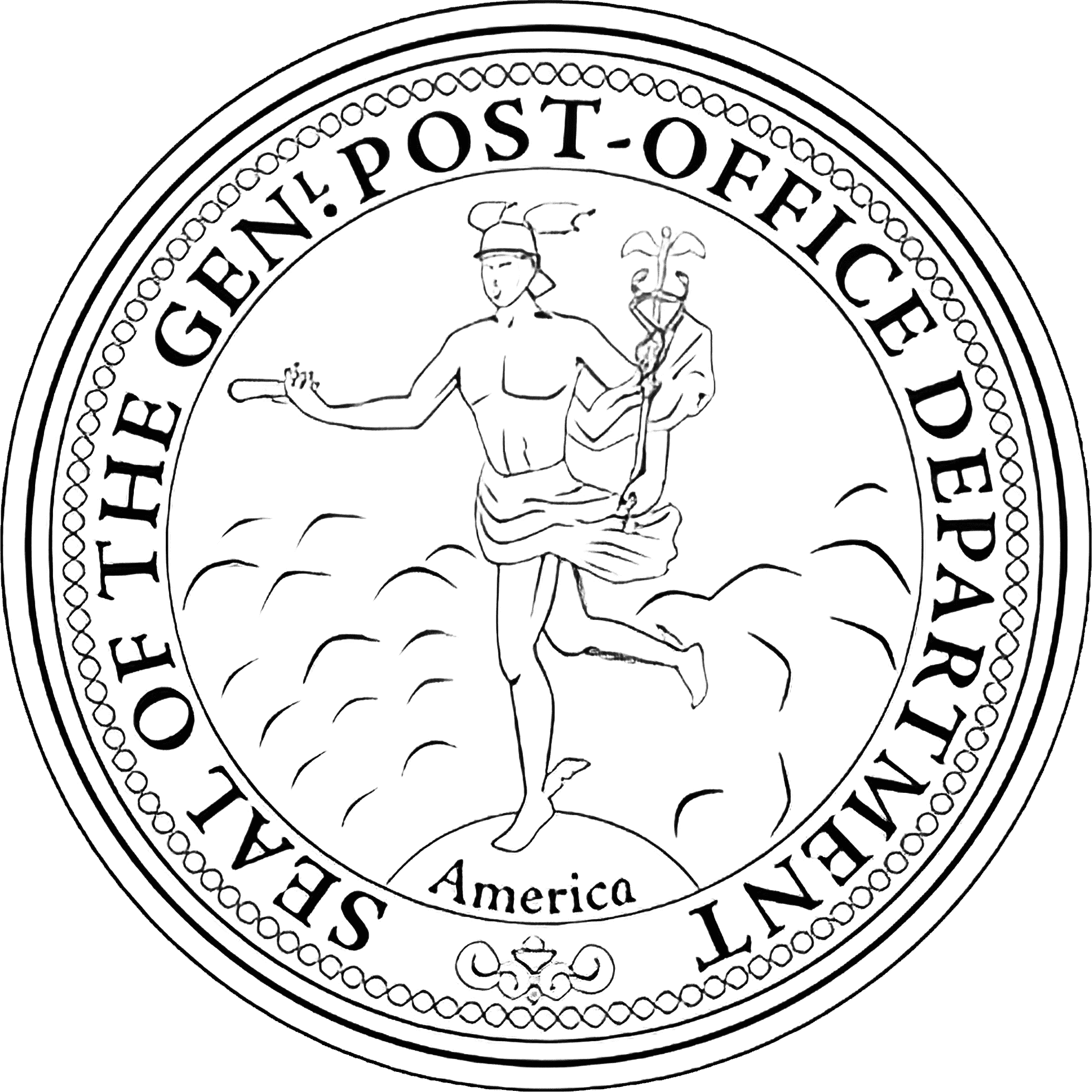
The first Post Office Department seal, depicting the deity Mercury, used until 1837.

Post Office Act of 1791. Digitized by the National Postal Museum of the Smithsonian Institution in Washington, D.C.

William Goddard, a Patriot printer frustrated that the Royal Mail was unable to reliably deliver his Pennsylvania Chronicle to its readers or deliver critical news for the paper to Goddard, laid out a plan for the "Constitutional Post" before the Continental Congress on October 5, 1774. Congress waited to act on the plan until after the Battle of Lexington and Concord on April 19, 1775. Benjamin Franklin promoted Goddard's plan and was appointed as the first postmaster general under the Continental Congress beginning on July 26, 1775, nearly one year before the Congress declared independence from the British Crown. Franklin's son-in-law, Richard Bache, took over the position on November 7, 1776, when Franklin became an American emissary to France.

Franklin had already made a significant contribution to the postal service in the colonies while serving as the postmaster of Philadelphia from 1737 and as joint postmaster general of the colonies from 1753 to 1774. He was dismissed as colonial postmaster general after the publication of private letters of Massachusetts Royal Governor Thomas Hutchinson in Massachusetts; Franklin admitted to acquiring the letters (probably from a third party, and not in any sort of official capacity) and sending them to Massachusetts. While postmaster, Franklin streamlined postal delivery with properly surveyed and marked routes from Maine to Florida (the origins of Route 1), instituted overnight postal travel between the critical cities of New York and Philadelphia and created a standardized rate chart based upon weight and distance.

Samuel Osgood held the postmaster general's position in New York City from 1789, when the U.S. Constitution came into effect, until the government moved to Philadelphia in 1791. Timothy Pickering took over and, about a year later, the Postal Service Act gave his post greater legislative legitimacy and more effective organization. Pickering continued in the position until 1795, when he briefly served as secretary of war, before becoming the third U.S. secretary of state.

Because news was considered crucial to an informed electorate, the 1792 law distributed newspapers to subscribers for 1 penny up to 100 miles and 1.5 cents over 100 miles; printers could send their newspapers to other newspaper publishers for free. Postage for letters, by contrast, cost between 6 and 25 cents depending on distance. This subsidy amounted to roughly 0.2 percent of US Gross Domestic Product (GDP), according to McChesney and Nichols.

The postmaster general's position was considered a plum patronage post for political allies of the president until the Postal Service was transformed into a corporation run by a board of governors in 1971 following passage of the Postal Reorganization Act.

== Economics ==
JD Thomas said the Postal Service Act was shaped in part by the desire to avoid censorship employed by the Crown to try to suppress their political opponents in colonial times. He also claimed that "the promise of mail delivery [helped] grow the nation and economy instead of serving only existing communities." He illustrated its importance to people on the frontier by discussing the role of mail in the lives of people around Royalton, NY. Before they got a post office in 1826, "The neighbors would club together, put a boy on a horse, and about once a month he could be seen wending his way through forest and stream, ... to get, perchance, half a dozen letters and papers for four times that number of families. ... [W]hen he returned, if no tidings came from loved ones, they did their best to suppress the silent tears that would often betray their sadness."

Researchers have claimed that the widespread availability of newspapers contributed to a high literacy rate in the U.S. This in turn helped increase the rate of economic growth, thereby contributing to its dominant position in the international economy today.

== See also ==
- Post Office Act of 1872
- Postal Reorganization Act of 1970
