= National Postal Union =

American labor union

- Formation: 1958
- Dissolved: 1971
- Type: Labour union

The National Postal Union (NPU) was a labor union representing workers in the postal service in the United States.

== History ==
The union was founded in 1958, as a split from the United Federation of Postal Clerks (UFPC). It soon became an industrial union, accepting all postal workers, although most of its members were clerks. By 1968, it had 70,000 members, mostly in the north east of the country.

In 1966, a bid to reunite the NPU and the UFPC was narrowly lost. On July 1, 1971, it merged with the National Association of Special Delivery Messengers, the United Federation of Postal Clerks, the National Association of Post Office and General Services Maintenance Employees, and the National Federation of Post Office Motor Vehicle Employees, to form the American Postal Workers' Union.

== Presidents ==
1958: John W. MacKay
1964: Sidney A. Goodman
1967: David Silvergleid
