= Mark Dimondstein =

Mark Dimondstein is an American labor union leader.

Dimondstein began working for the United States Postal Service in Greensboro, North Carolina, in 1983. He joined the American Postal Workers Union (APWU), and in 1986 he was elected as president of his union local. The city council also appointed him to the Greensboro Human Relations Commission.

In 1999, Dimondstein led an organizing drive which led workers at East Coast Leasing to join the APWU, the union's first success in the private sector. The following year, he was appointed as the union's National Lead Field Organizer. For his successes in the private sector, he was in 2001 made the AFL-CIO Southern Organizer of the Year Award.

In 2013, Dimondstein stood for the presidency of the union, defeating incumbent Cliff Guffey. He focused on opposing potential privatization of the post office, and of reducing deliveries to five days a week, and proposed doing so by working more closely with other AFL-CIO affiliates. He was also elected as a vice-president of the AFL-CIO.

Trade union offices
| Preceded by Cliff Guffey | President of the American Postal Workers Union; 2013–present | Succeeded by Incumbent |
