= William Burrus =

William Henry Burrus (December 13, 1936 – May 19, 2018) was an American labor union leader.

Born in Wheeling, West Virginia, Burrus studied at West Virginia State College, then joined the United States Army, serving in the 101st Airborne Division and the 4th Armored Division. In 1957, he left the army, and became a distribution clerk with the United States Postal Service, based in Cleveland.

Burrus joined the American Postal Workers Union. He took part in the U.S. postal strike of 1970, and was elected as president of his local union. While in this role, he became the founding president of the union's National Presidents Conference, and led a movement in 1978 which successfully rejected a collective bargaining agreement which would have limited cost-of-living increases.

In 1980, Burrus was elected as executive vice president of the union, leading negotiations with the postal service. In 2001, he was elected as the union's president, the first African American to become leader of a national union through a direct ballot of the union membership. As president, he campaigned against government efforts to worsen postal workers' pay and conditions, and following the 2001 anthrax attacks, campaigned for safer working conditions.

Burrus also served as a vice-president of the AFL-CIO. He retired from all his posts in 2010, and died in 2018.

Trade union offices
Preceded by Moe Biller	President of the American Postal Workers Union; 2001–2010	Succeeded by Cliff Guffey
