= National Federation of Post Office Motor Vehicle Employees =

- Abbreviation: NFPOMVE
- Predecessor: National Association of Post Office Chauffeurs and Mechanics Union
- Merged into: American Postal Workers' Union
- Formation: 1924
- Founded at: United States
- Dissolved: July 1, 1971
- Merger of: National Association of Special Delivery Messengers; United Federation of Postal Clerks; National Association of Post Office and General Services Maintenance Employees; National Postal Union
- Type: Labor union
- Legal status: Defunct (merged)
- Purpose: Representing motor vehicle employees of the United States Postal Service.
- Services: Labor representation, collective bargaining.
- Methods: Affiliation with the AFL-CIO.
- Fields: Labor relations, postal service, transportation
- Members: over 8,000 (by 1968) (1968)
- Parent organization: AFL-CIO (from 1958)
- Affiliations: AFL-CIO
- Funding: Membership dues
- Remarks: Formerly known as the National Association of Post Office Chauffeurs and Mechanics Union.
- Formerly called: National Association of Post Office Chauffeurs and Mechanics Union

The National Federation of Post Office Motor Vehicle Employees (NFPOMVE) was a labor union representing workers for the United States Postal Service.

The union was founded in 1924, as the National Association of Post Office Chauffeurs and Mechanics Union. On June 10, 1958, it was chartered by the AFL-CIO, and by 1968, it had over 8,000 members. On July 1, 1971, it merged with the National Association of Special Delivery Messengers, the United Federation of Postal Clerks, the National Association of Post Office and General Services Maintenance Employees, and the National Postal Union, to form the American Postal Workers' Union.
