= United National Association of Post Office Clerks =

American labor union

- Formation: 1899
- Dissolved: 1961
- Type: Trade Union
- Location: United States

The United National Association of Post Office Clerks (UNAPOC) was a labor union representing clerks working in the post office in the United States.

== History ==
The union was founded in 1899 in New York City, with the merger of the National Association of Post Office Clerks, and the United Association of Post Office Clerks. The union did not join the American Federation of Labor (AFL), and was regarded as being conservative, which led some locals to form the rival National Federation of Post Office Clerks (NFPOC), which received an AFL charter. In 1917, UNAPOC attempted to affiliate to the AFL, but was rejected as the NFPOC held its charter for the trade, and the two unions remained opposed to each other.

By 1925, the union had nearly 40,000 members. In the 1950s, it changed its name to the United National Association of Post Office Craftsmen. On April 17, 1961, the union merged with the NFPOC, to form the United Federation of Post Office Clerks.

== Presidents ==
Frank T. Rogers
1920s: C. P. Franciscus
1933: John J. Barrett
1940s: William C. Armbrust
Samuel E. Klein
Joseph F. Thomas
