= 1970 United States postal strike =

Eight-day strike by workers in the U.S. Post Office Department

U.S. postal strike of 1970
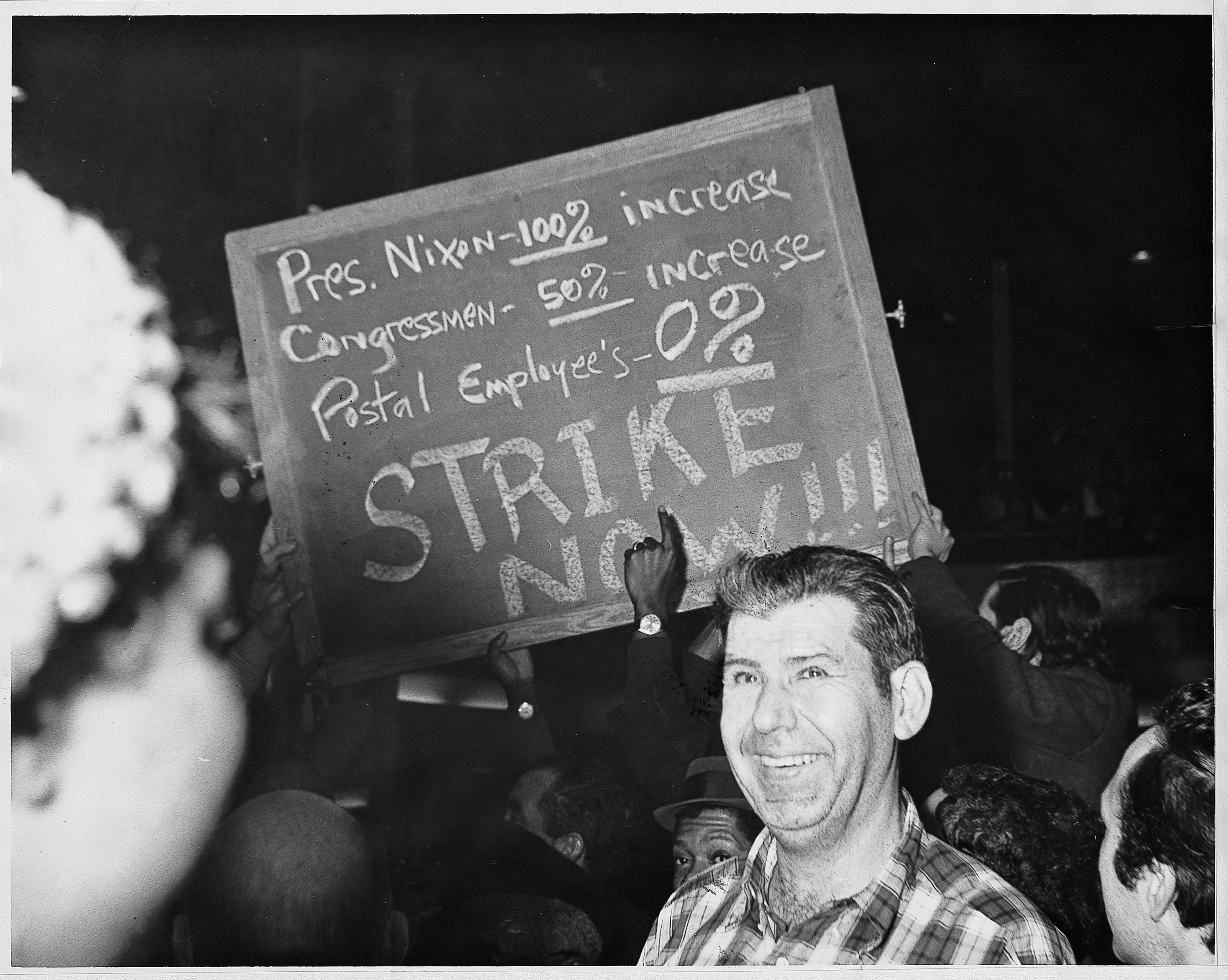
- Striking postal workers highlight the disparity in wages between themselves and the politicians
- Date: March 18–25, 1970 (approximately)
- Location: began in New York City, spread across the United States
- Caused by: Low wages and poor working conditions
- Result: Postal Reorganization Act

Parties
Postal workers	Labor unions	United States federal government

Lead figures
New York City letter carriers	NALC president James Rademacher, NALC rank and file strike leader Vincent Sombrotto	US president Richard Nixon, Postmaster General Winton M. Blount

Number
approximately 200,000	few	few

The U.S. postal strike of 1970 was an eight-day strike by federal postal workers in March 1970. The strike began in New York City and spread to some other cities in the following two weeks. This strike against the federal government, regarded as illegal, was the largest wildcat strike in U.S. history.

President Richard Nixon called out the United States armed forces and the National Guard in an attempt to distribute the mail and break the strike.

The strike influenced the contents of the Postal Reorganization Act of 1970, which dissolved the United States Post Office Department, replaced it with the more corporate United States Postal Service, and guaranteed collective bargaining rights for postal workers (though not the right to strike).

== Causes ==
At the time, postal workers were not permitted by law to engage in collective bargaining. Striking postal workers felt wages were very low, benefits poor and working conditions unhealthy and unsafe. APWU president Moe Biller described Manhattan (New York City) post offices as like "dungeons," dirty, stifling, too hot in summer, and too cold in winter.

The Post Office Department's management was outdated and, according to workers, haphazard. Postal union lobbying of Congress to obtain higher pay and better working conditions had proven fruitless.

An immediate trigger for the strike was a Congressional decision to raise the wages of postal workers by only 4%, at the same time as Congress raised its own pay by 41%.

The post office was home to many black workers, and this population increased as whites left postal work in the 1950s and '60s for better jobs. Postal workers in general were upset about the low wages and poor conditions.

The importance of black workers was amplified by militancy outside the post office. Isaac & Christiansen identify the civil rights movement as a major contributor to the 1970 strike as well as other radical labor actions. They highlight several causal connections, including cultural climate, overlapping personnel, and the simple "demonstration effect," showing that nonviolent civil disobedience could accomplish political change.

== The strike ==
On March 17, 1970, in New York City, members of National Association of Letter Carriers (NALC) Branch 36 met in Manhattan and voted to strike. Picketing began just after midnight, on March 18. This was a mass action where rank and file leaders emerged like Manhattan letter carrier Vincent Sombrotto, who would go on to be elected first branch and then national president of the NALC.

More than 210,000 United States Post Office Department workers were eventually involved across the nation, although initially the strike affected only workers in New York City. These workers decided to strike against the wishes of their leadership. The spontaneous unity produced by this decision empowered the workers.

President Nixon appeared on national television and ordered the employees back to work, but his address only stiffened the resolve of the existing strikers and angered workers in another 671 locations in other cities into walking out as well. Workers in other government agencies also announced they would strike if Nixon pursued legal action against the postal employees.

Authorities were unsure of how to proceed. Union leaders pleaded with the workers to return to their jobs. The government was hesitant to arrest strike leaders for fear of arousing sympathy among other workers, and because of popular support for the strikers.

=== Impact ===
The strike crippled the nation's mail system. The stock market fell due to the strike's effect on trading volume, and there was concern that the stock market would have to close entirely.

When the strike first kicked off, Postal Letter Carriers were delivering more than 270 million pieces of mail a day. Due to carriers striking, this led to the lack of distribution of the mail and a massive buildup of important government and financial documents. The strike not only affected a normal citizens daily life, but also prohibited 18 year old men from being notified about them being drafted to go to war in Vietnam.

During 1970, the annual salary for a postal worker was $6,176 (equivalent to $51,202 in 2025) in comparison with sanitation workers, who were making $7,870 (equivalent to $65,246 in 2025). After the postal workers conducted numerous pickets, they had finally won a 6% wage increase. President Nixon felt pressure from postal workers to collectively bargain for a better salary. With pressure applied, President Nixon signed the Postal Reorganization Act (PRA) to create the new U.S. Postal Service, in which postal workers would gain an additional 8% wage increase.

=== Nixon summons the National Guard ===
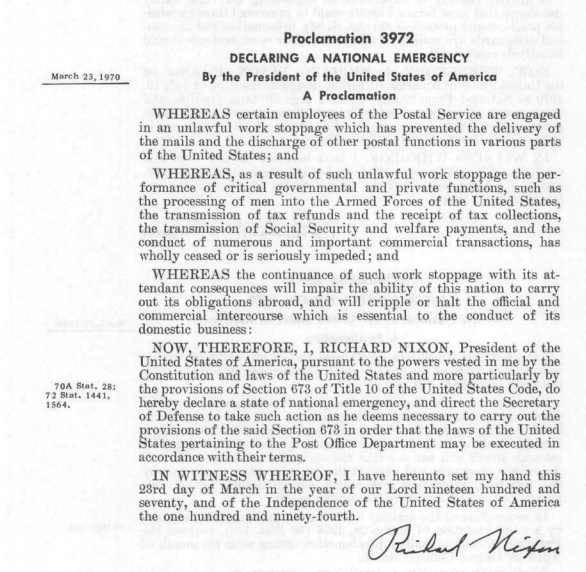
Nixon's Proclamation 3972 declared a national state of emergency, and authorized military control over the post office

Nixon spoke to the nation again on March 23, asking the workers to go back to their jobs and announcing that he would deploy the National Guard to deliver mail in New York. This announcement was accompanied by Proclamation 3972, which declared a national emergency.

Nixon then ordered 24,000 military personnel forces to begin distributing the mail. Operation Graphic Hand had at its peak more than 18,500 military personnel assigned to 17 New York post offices, from regular Army, National Guard, Army Reserve, Air National Guard and Navy, Air Force, and Marine Corps Reserve. This was not necessarily very effective.

=== Conclusion ===
The strike ended after eight days with not a single worker being fired, as the Nixon administration continued to negotiate with postal union leaders. With Nixon signing the Postal Reorganization Act, workers were given an additional 8% wage increase. Although the Postal Strike was "unlawful," it ended up being the largest strike against the Federal Government and the first walk-out against the Federal Government in U.S. history. Remedies from this strike included lower-cost life insurance, increased wages, and safer working conditions.

== Outcomes ==
=== Postal Reorganization Act ===
The postal strike influenced the passage and signing of the Postal Reorganization Act of 1970. Effective July 1, 1971, the U.S. Post Office Department became the U.S. Postal Service, an independent establishment of the executive branch. The four major postal unions (National Association of Letter Carriers, American Postal Workers Union, National Postal Mail Handlers Union, and the National Rural Letter Carriers Association) won full collective bargaining rights: the right to negotiate on wages, benefits and working conditions, although they still were not allowed the right to strike.

=== American Postal Workers Union ===
On July 1, 1971, five federal postal unions merged to form the American Postal Workers Union, the largest postal workers union in the world. APWU was a conglomeration of previous labor unions in mail service. The NAPE's origins from the "thirteen original colonies" compiled of college-educated African American railway mail service workers. NAPE, standing for National Alliance of Postal Employees, began in 1923 to unionize all African Americans in the United States Postal Service. Evolving into incorporating government workers outside the postal service, the name commonly used now is NAPFE, National Alliance of Postal and Federal Employees.

During the 1960s Jim Crow Era, Mississippi NAACP leadership rose as African American civil rights activists joined the postal workers union.

== See also ==
- List of US strikes by size
