= Annie Sinclair Cunningham =

Scottish religious worker (1832-1897)

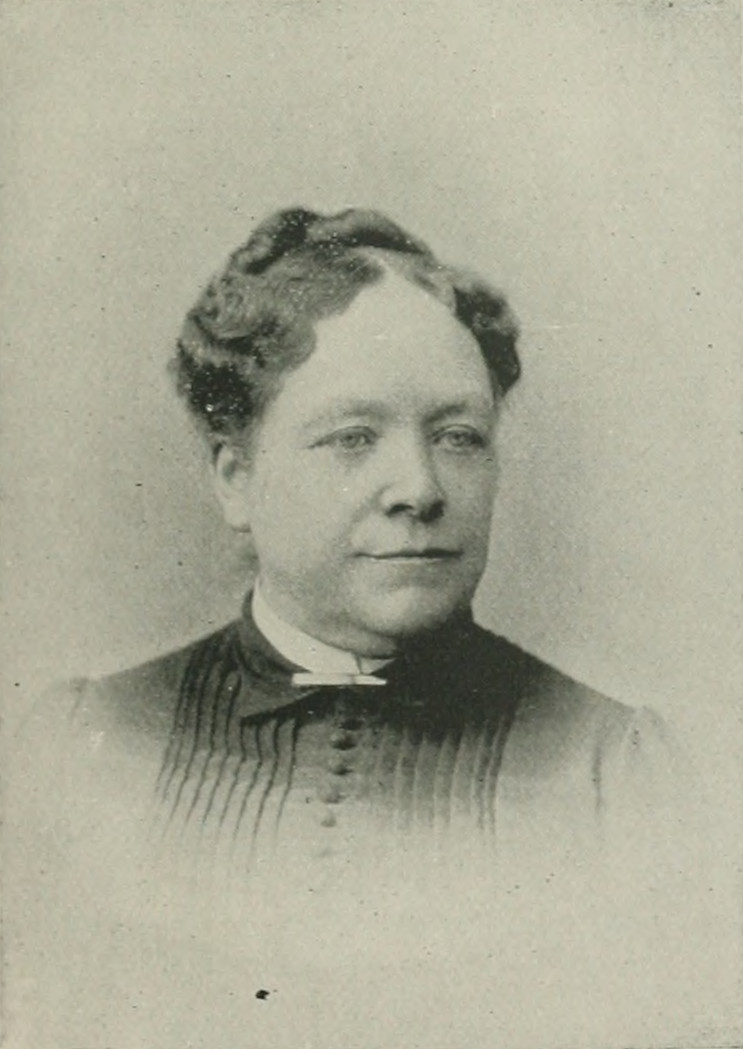
Annie Sinclair Cunningham

Annie Sinclair Cunningham (October 29, 1832 – February 17, 1897) was a Scottish-born American religious worker. Mrs. Cunningham was one of the founders of the Woman's Foreign Missionary Society of the Presbyterian Church. She was president of the Washington Presbytery Mission Society for a number of years, one of the secretaries of the Chautauqua Missionary institute, and served as a leader in local works of charity. While in Scotland, she was chosen president of the Missionary Association of the World.

== Early years and education ==
Annie Campbell Fraser Sinclair was born in the West Highlands, Scotland, October 29 (or October 27), 1832. Her father, Rev. John C. Sinclair, a Presbyterian clergyman, used to preach in a church in Charlotte, N.C. Her mother's maiden name was Mary Julia MacLean, she being a descendant of the Duart and Lochbuy houses. The parents were married in 1822. There were nine children, of whom Cunningham was the fifth. Only five of the number lived to mature age. While the children were young, the parents emigrated to Nova Scotia, and removed a few years later to Prince Edward Island, where ten years were spent by her father in home missionary work.

To secure a more liberal education for their children, the family went to Newburyport, Massachusetts, in 1852, where Cunningham was admitted to the girls' high School. Young as she was when the family left Scotland, Cunningham could read and speak two languages, Gaelic and English, though she had never been to school, except the home school in the manse. At the age of eleven, she made a public profession of her faith and became a member of the church of which her father was the pastor. When her two brothers, James and Alexander Sinclair, were ready to study theology, choice was made of the Western Theological Seminary, in Allegheny, Pennsylvania, and the family removed to Pittsburgh, Pennsylvania, in 1854.

== Career ==
In 1858, at Bridgewater, Pennsylvania, she married Dr. Rev. David Avers Cunningham, who was at the time pastor of the Presbyterian Church, of Bridgewater. There, their only child was born and buried. In 1864, Dr. Cunningham was called to Philadelphia, where he was for twelve years a pastor. During those twelve years, there came a period of great activity among the women of the various denominations. When the Woman's Foreign Missionary Society of the Presbyterian Church was organized in 1870, she was one of its founders, and remained an officer for some years. The Woman's Christian Association of Philadelphia came into existence about the same time. Cunningham was the first chairman of its nominating committee, and was thus intimately associated with Christian women of every name in the city. She was for a time an officer in the organization of the women of Philadelphia for the Centennial Exposition of 1876.

From early womanhood to later years, she was a successful Bible-class teacher. In 1876, Dr. Cunningham accepted a call to the First Presbyterian Church of Wheeling, West Virginia. New work was found there with capable women ready to be organized for Christian labor, and for fifteen years, she was the president of a missionary society which included all the women and children of the thirty-nine churches in the Presbytery of Washington. For nearly ten years, she was one of the secretaries of the Chautauqua Missionary Institute, in which women of all denominations meet annually. She was an enthusiastic admirer of the Chautauqua Literary and Scientific Circle, and completed the course of reading in 1888.

== Later years and death ==
She had been suffering for several years from internal trouble. Since she returned from Edinburgh, Scotland, where she was one of the United States delegates to the Evangelical Alliance, her condition continued to grow more serious, and within the last few weeks of her life, a surgical operation was considered necessary. She did not survive the operation, and died February 17, 1897. In 2004, she was inducted into the Wheeling Hall of Fame for her work in religion and education.
