= Marion Moses =

American physician (1936–2020)

- Born: Marion Theresa Moses; January 24, 1936; Wheeling, West Virginia
- Died: August 28, 2020 (aged 84); San Francisco, California
- Occupations: Physician, nurse, labor activist

Marion Theresa Moses (January 24, 1936 – August 28, 2020) was an American physician, nurse, and labor activist, closely associated with Cesar Chavez.

== Early life ==
Marion Moses was born in Wheeling, West Virginia, the daughter of Maron Moses and Mary Wakim Moses; her grandparents were immigrants from Lebanon. She trained as a nurse at Georgetown University in 1957, and earned a master's degree in nursing education at Teachers College, Columbia University in 1960. She pursued further studies in English at the University of California, Berkeley, but left to work. In 1976, she earned a medical degree at Temple University.

== Career ==
Moses worked as a nurse in Charleston, West Virginia, and at UCSF Medical Center in San Francisco. She was a graduate student when she met Cesar Chavez in 1965, and joined his campaign for farmworkers' rights from 1966 to 1971, as a nurse treating strikers. She traveled to New York and stayed with Gloria Steinem while promoting the farmworkers' cause in the East with a national grape boycott, demonstrations, lobbying, and benefit concerts.

Moses became a physician in 1976, and completed an internship at the University of Colorado and a residency in occupational medicine at Mount Sinai Hospital in New York. She acted as personal physician to Chavez during and after hunger strikes, and to Catholic activist Dorothy Day. She helped Chavez find rehabilitation and a therapeutic rocking chair for his chronic back pain. From 1983 to 1986, she was medical director of the United Farm Workers union. She was an adjunct professor at San Diego State University's School of Public Health. In 1988, she founded the Pesticide Education Center, and remained as its director until her retirement in 2016.

She wrote about her work in publications that included Harvest of Sorrow: Farm Workers and Pesticides (1992) and Designer Poisons: How to Protect Your Health and Home from Toxic Pesticides (1995), and an essay about Chavez for The Catholic Worker. She appears in the 2013 documentary Cesar's Last Fast.

== Personal life ==
Moses died in 2020, aged 84 years, in San Francisco, California. Her papers are in the Archives of Labor and Urban Affairs at Wayne State University in Detroit.
