= American Postal Workers Union =

American labor union representing employees of the United States Postal Service

- American Postal Workers Union
- Founded: July 1, 1971
- Headquarters: Washington, D.C.
- Location: United States
- Members: 330,000
- Key people: Jonathan Smith, President
- Affiliations: AFL–CIO, UNI
- Website: www.apwu.org

The American Postal Workers Union (APWU) is a labor union in the United States. It represents over 200,000 employees and retirees of the United States Postal Service who belong to the Clerk, Maintenance, Motor Vehicle, and Support Services divisions. It also represents approximately 2,000 private-sector mail workers.

== History ==
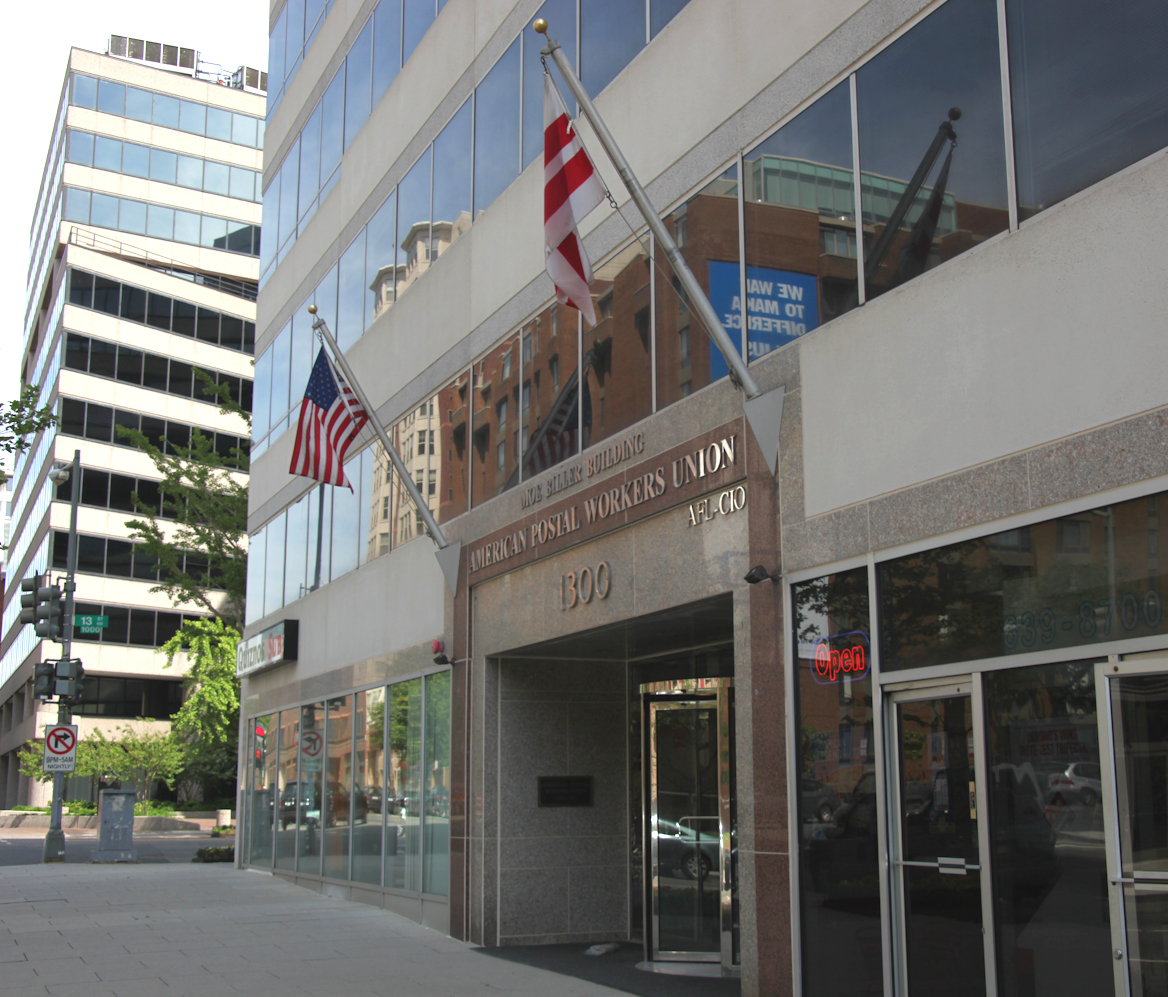
The APWU headquarters at 1300 L Street NW in Washington, D.C.

Postal workers in the United States first won collective bargaining rights after the U.S. postal strike of 1970. Two organizations of postal clerks emerged in the 1890s; they merged in 1899 into the United National Association of Post Office Clerks (UNAPOC).

It was too conservative for the AFL, which in 1906 sponsored the National Federation of Post Office Clerks (NFPOC), which soon surpassed the UNAPOC. NFPOC grew from 16,000 members in 1922, to 36,000 in 1932, and nearly 50,000 by 1940. It did not engage in strikes, but spent much of its efforts in opposing hostile Congressional legislation. Additional rivals were formed in the 1930s, but the first serious rival was the National Postal Clerks Union (NPCU) that began in 1958; by 1970, the NPCU had reached a membership of 80,000.

Merger discussions dragged on for years, until finally the NFPOC, UNAPOC, the National Postal Transport Association, and others merged in 1961 as the United Federation of Postal Clerks. In 1971 five unions combined into the American Postal Workers Union. They were the United Federation of Postal Clerks, the National Postal Union, the National Association of Post Office and General Service Maintenance Employees, the National Federation of Post Office Motor Vehicle Employees, and the National Association of Special Delivery Messengers, with a combined membership of 280,000.

On August 20, 2007, the previously independent National Postal Professional Nurses (NPPN) merged with the APWU. As a result of this merger, the members of the NPPN were granted membership in the Support Services Division of the APWU. The NPPN-APWU represents over 90 occupational health nurses who are employed by the Postal Service. This 2007 merger was the first merger of any postal unions in the United States since the U.S. postal strike of 1970.

=== S. 1507 ===
On Thursday, July 30, 2009, the Senate Homeland Security and Governmental Affairs Committee voted, 12–1, in favor of S. 1507 (Postal Service Retiree Health Benefits Funding Reform Act of 2009), which would provide financial relief to the Postal Service. An amendment, offered by Sen. Tom Coburn (R-OK), requiring the arbitrator to take into consideration the financial health of the Postal Service when deciding Postal Union contracts, was added prior to its passage. Sen. Joe Lieberman (ID-CT), chairman of the Senate Committee on Homeland Security and Government Affairs, and Sen. Tom Carper (D-DE), chairman of the subcommittee on Federal Financial Management, Government information, Federal Services and International Security, supported the amendment, and voted with committee Republicans for its adoption. The American Postal Workers Union, National Postal Mail Handlers Union, the NALC and the NRLCA have all voiced opposition to S. 1507 with its inclusion of the arbitrator amendment.

=== American Postal Workers Accident Benefit Association ===
This Association was organized as a fraternal benefit society for railway clerks by five men in Portsmouth, New Hampshire in 1898. The original name of the association was the National Association of Railway Postal Clerks. The name of the society was changed to Railway Mail Association in 1904, and the National Postal Transport Association in 1949. In 1961, it became the United Federation of Postal Clerks Benefit Association. It adopted its present name in 1972.

Membership is open to all members of the American Postal Workers Union who are employed as postal workers. In 1979, there were 23,000 members in 604 local branches. Branch meetings are held concurrently with meetings of the American Postal Workers Union. In addition to insurance benefits, the APW-ABA sponsors blood banks, Boy Scout troops, conducts drives for community and medical research funds, and visits sick and disabled members. The highest authority is the National Convention, which meets biennially. Headquarters are in Portsmouth, New Hampshire.

There is a brief initiation ritual, in which the candidate pledges to support the US constitution, the laws of the society, become acquainted with the history of the society and defend its principles. The candidate also pledges "to be considerate to the widow and the orphan; the weak and the defenseless; to defend freedom of thought and expression; and to promote the spirit of fraternity." There are no religious elements in the ritual, though the regular order of business includes provisions for an invocation.

In 1979, the American Postal Workers Accident Benefit Association was a member of the National Fraternal Congress of America, however it does not appear on the current list of members of the Congress, now known as the American Fraternal Alliance.

== Presidents ==
1971: Francis S. Filbey
1977: Emmet Andrews
1980: Moe Biller
2001: Bill Burrus
2010: Cliff Guffey
2013: Mark Dimondstein
2025: Jonathan Smith

== See also ==
- United States Postal Service
- National Association of Letter Carriers
- National Postal Mail Handlers Union
- National Rural Letter Carriers' Association
