= Rosemary Front =

American speech pathologist

- Rosemary Front, from a 2007 newspaper.
- Born: December 13, 1940; Wheeling, West Virginia
- Died: April 26, 2009; Wheeling, West Virginia
- Occupation: Speech pathologist
- Known for: Disability rights advocacy

Rosemary Front (December 13, 1940 – April 26, 2009) was an American speech pathologist and disability rights advocate.

== Early life ==
Rosemary Margaret Front was born in Wheeling, West Virginia, the daughter of Peter Front and Mary Margaret Latimer Front. Her father was born in Austria. She graduated from Triadelphia High School. She earned a bachelor's degree at Southern Illinois University in 1966, and a master's degree at Wayne State University.

Front survived polio in adolescence, spent time in an iron lung during her recovery, and used a wheelchair.

== Career ==
Front was a speech pathologist, and a member of the American Speech and Hearing Association. From 1969 to 1998, she was director of the Easter Seal Rehabilitation Center in Wheeling, and served three years as head of the West Virginia Easter Seal Society, and on the executive board of the National Easter Seal Society. She led the Wheeling Society for Crippled Children for many years.

In 1974 she served on the statewide advisory board on implementing the Individuals with Disabilities Education Act. In 1982, she was presented with an honorary Doctor of Law degree at Wheeling University's commencement ceremonies. Front was appointed to the United States Access Board by Ronald Reagan, and served as a board member from 1983 to 1986.

== Personal life ==
Front was a member of Temple Shalom in Wheeling, and active as a fundraiser in the congregation's Hadassah chapter. She died in 2009, aged 68 years. In 2013, Front was posthumously inducted into the Wheeling Hall of Fame.
