= National Federation of Post Office Clerks =

- Abbreviation: NFPOC
- Merged into: United Federation of Post Office Clerks
- Formation: August 26, 1906
- Founder: Locals affiliated with the American Federation of Labor (AFL)
- Founded at: United States
- Dissolved: April 17, 1961
- Merger of: United National Association of Post Office Clerks
- Type: Labor union
- Legal status: Defunct (merged)
- Purpose: Representing clerks working in post offices in the United States.
- Origins: Dissatisfaction with the conservative United National Association of Post Office Clerks (UNAPOC).
- Services: Labor representation, collective bargaining.
- Methods: Affiliation with the American Federation of Labor (AFL) later the AFL-CIO.
- Fields: Labor relations, postal service
- Members: approximately 40,000 (by 1925); 95,000 (by 1953) (1925; 1953)
- Official language: English
- Parent organization: American Federation of Labor (1906-1955); AFL-CIO (1955-1961)
- Subsidiaries: Brotherhood of Railway Postal Clerks (briefly, 1917-1919)
- Affiliations: American Federation of Labor (AFL); AFL-CIO
- Funding: Membership dues
- Remarks: Briefly renamed itself as the National Federation of Postal Employees (1917-1919).

The National Federation of Post Office Clerks (NFPOC) was a labor union representing clerks working in post offices in the United States.

== History ==
At the start of the 20th century, the main union of post office clerks was the United National Association of Post Office Clerks (UNAPOC). However, this was a conservative association, which distanced itself from the labor movement, and some locals, particularly in Chicago, instead affiliated directly to the American Federation of Labor (AFL). On August 26, 1906, these locals formed the NFPOC, which was chartered by the AFL. In 1917, it absorbed the Brotherhood of Railway Postal Clerks, and renamed itself as the National Federation of Postal Employees. Two years later, it transferred the railway postal clerks to the Railway Mail Association and became the NFPOC once more. By 1925, the union had nearly 40,000 members.

The union's membership grew to 95,000 by 1953. It transferred to the new AFL-CIO in 1955. On April 17, 1961, the union merged with UNAPOC to form the United Federation of Post Office Clerks.

== Presidents ==
1906: Edward B. Goltra
1910: Oscar F. Nelson
1913: George Pfieffer
1915: Arthur Honewell
1917: Gilbert E. Hyatt
1923: Leo E. George
1956: J. Cline House
1960: Elroy C. Hallbeck
