= Private Express Statutes =

The Private Express Statutes (PES) are a group of United States federal civil and criminal laws placing various restrictions on the carriage and delivery of letters by all organizations other than the United States Postal Service.

== History ==
The United States Congress originally passed the PES in 1792, under powers granted it in the United States Constitution to "establish Post Offices and Post Roads." The PES granted the government the power for the carriage and delivery of letter mail. Today the USPS is empowered to suspend the PES, if it believes such a private postal service would be in the interests of the general public.

The PES consists of 18 U.S.C. §§ 1693–1696 and 39 U.S.C. §§ 601–606, implemented under 39 Code of Federal Regulations Parts 310 and 320. These restrict the carriage and delivery of letter mail by private organizations, except as described in the next section. The PES only covers "letters" and not other mailable items such as parcels or periodicals.

== Exceptions ==
=== "Extremely urgent" letters ===
In 1979 the Postal Service authorized the delivery of extremely urgent letters outside the USPS; this has given rise to delivery services such as FedEx and UPS's express mail services. Records of pick up and delivery must be maintained for Postal Service inspection if the time sensitive exception is being used.

=== Lawful private carriage ===
It is possible to set up a private mail delivery service known as "lawful private carriage" if the USPS postage is paid in addition to any private postage fee that is collected. Records must be maintained that such postage has been paid, and it must be affixed to the letter cover by U.S. stamps, meter imprints or through another method approved by the USPS; the postage must be canceled by the sender in ink; the date of mailing must be affixed in ink to the cover (either by sender or carrier); and the letter cannot be removed without defacing the cover from the envelope or other container in which the letter is sent. An agreement must be entered into with the Postal Service to conduct volume private carriage through the Pricing and Classification Service Center.

=== Occasional private mail delivery ===
One does not need to establish a private mail delivery service for the occasional commercial transport of a letter outside the mails so long as the rate which would have been due to the USPS is affixed in stamps, the stamps are cancelled in ink, and the date of receipt by the carrier or the transport of the letter, are noted thereon. All these privately carried letters can bear a private cancellation if the cancellation is done in ink; private cancellations are different from private overprints on postage stamps.

=== Special messenger services ===
There are limited exceptions for special messenger services which deliver less than twenty-five letters for an individual or company per occasion. In such case no postage need be paid or affixed to the letters; pick up and delivery can be from private residences and commercial businesses.

=== Free delivery ===
The delivery of letters without compensation and without the affixation or payment of any postage is allowed under 39 CFR 310.3(c) by third parties, and under 39 CFR 310.3(b) for one's own letters which includes regular employees only delivering company mail. Thus, it is not a violation of the PES if one delivers a letter of one's friend even without affixation of postage or if a company has one of its regular employees deliver mail that originates from the company to its customers. Compensation is considered to include barter and goodwill. Thus an individual or business who receives a benefit for the delivery of letters does not fall under such a free carriage exception. For example, buying a friend dinner in exchange for having him deliver a letter is not considered without compensation; in such a case one would be required to affix and cancel a sufficient amount of postage to the letter. Another example not falling under this exception would be a business that is carrying letters "free of charge" in the hopes of building business or incidental to some other delivery as an accommodation for its customer; this use would also require the affixation and cancellation of a sufficient amount of postage to be in compliance with the PES.

=== Cargo delivery ===
There is an exception for the delivery of what otherwise would be considered a letter if it is sent with cargo and the letter is somehow incidental to the ordering, delivery or shipping of the cargo [39 CFR 310.3(a)].

=== Other exceptions ===
Other exceptions to the PES include:

- Letters that at some point during their pick-up or delivery had previously entered into the USPS mailstream, unless the letters are consolidated.
- Letters addressed to specific persons that fall outside the purview of the PES.
- Certain documents and objects that are not considered letters, even though containing a message.

== See also ==
- American Letter Mail Company
