= Legacy Australia =

Australian non-profit organisation

- Founded: 1923; 103 years ago
- Founder: Stanley Savige
- Founded at: Melbourne
- Website: legacy.com.au

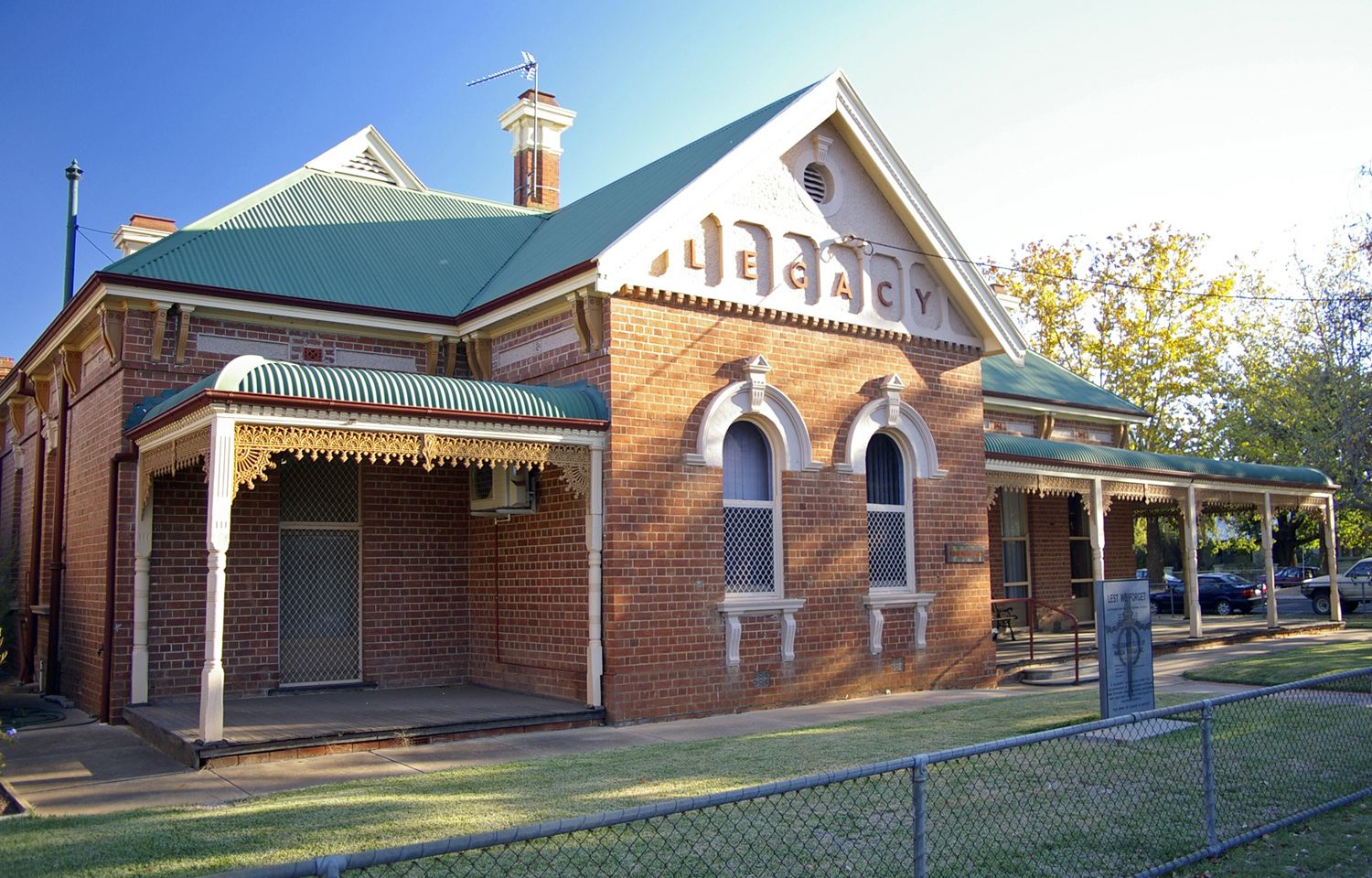
Legacy Australia, Wagga Wagga Branch

Legacy Australia is an Australian non-profit organisation established in 1923 by ex-servicemen. Legacy Australia provides support to the families of Australian Defence Force men and women who have lost their life or health in conflicts such as World War I, World War II, Vietnam War, Iraq and Afghanistan. In addition, any death which is deemed service-related may be eligible for assistance by Legacy Australia.

The symbol of Legacy Australia is a torch that signifies the undying flame of service and sacrifice of those who gave their lives for their country.

Out of deference to Legacy Australia, the Subaru Legacy was sold as the Subaru Liberty in Australia.

== Activities ==
Volunteer members are called Legatees because they accept the "legacy of care" for their comrades' families. 4,000 Legatees assist more than 40,000 widows and 1,800 children (referred to by Legacy Australia as "Junior Legatees") and disabled dependents across Australia providing assistance, accommodation, medical and social support. Legacy Australia's assistance depends on the individual situation of the person supported. With the help of Legatees, who stay in touch with all families, Legacy Australia ensures families receive their Legacy Australia entitlements and access to government benefits.

As well as financial help, Legacy Australia provides companionship and assistance with the education of children. Assistance in dealing with the Army, Navy, or Air Force, or the government is provided. In particular, specialist assistance is provided in submitting applications for Compensation for Dependents of Deceased Members and Former Members, including for War Widow's pensions and Income Support pensions. If initial claims are unsuccessful, when appropriate, Legacy Australia will arrange for advocates before review tribunals. These services are provided at no cost to claimants.

A road tunnel under construction in Brisbane is named Legacy Way in honour of the men and women serving in the Australian Defence Force.

== Fundraising ==
Funds are raised by a variety of methods, the most notable being the sale of special badges and other goods during "Legacy Week". This is usually during the first week of September when mainly school children volunteer their time to accomplish these sales, especially in Australia's central business districts. Legacy Australia also solicits donations from the public to assist with its mission.

In the past money has also been raised from special events, sponsorships, dinners, bequests and other events.

== Australian postage stamps ==
In 1948, the then current 2½d, equivalent to A$0.69 in 2022, Red Mitchell commemorative stamp was privately overprinted with the words "Supporting Legacy for 25 years" and a value ranging from 1/-, equivalent to A$3.46 in 2022, to £A 1, equivalent to A$69.2 in 2022, was also added which was the fundraising amount in addition to the legal cost of stamp of which the denomination was 2½d. Ten values were issued and were intended to raise funds for Legacy Australia. It is believed these stamps were authorised by the secretary of Fremantle Legacy Club in Western Australia.

In 1973, the Australian Post Office issued a 7 cent, equivalent to A$0.74 in 2022, commemorative stamp to commemorate 50 years of Legacy Australia.

== Legacy Park, Campbell ACT ==
Legacy Park Campbell
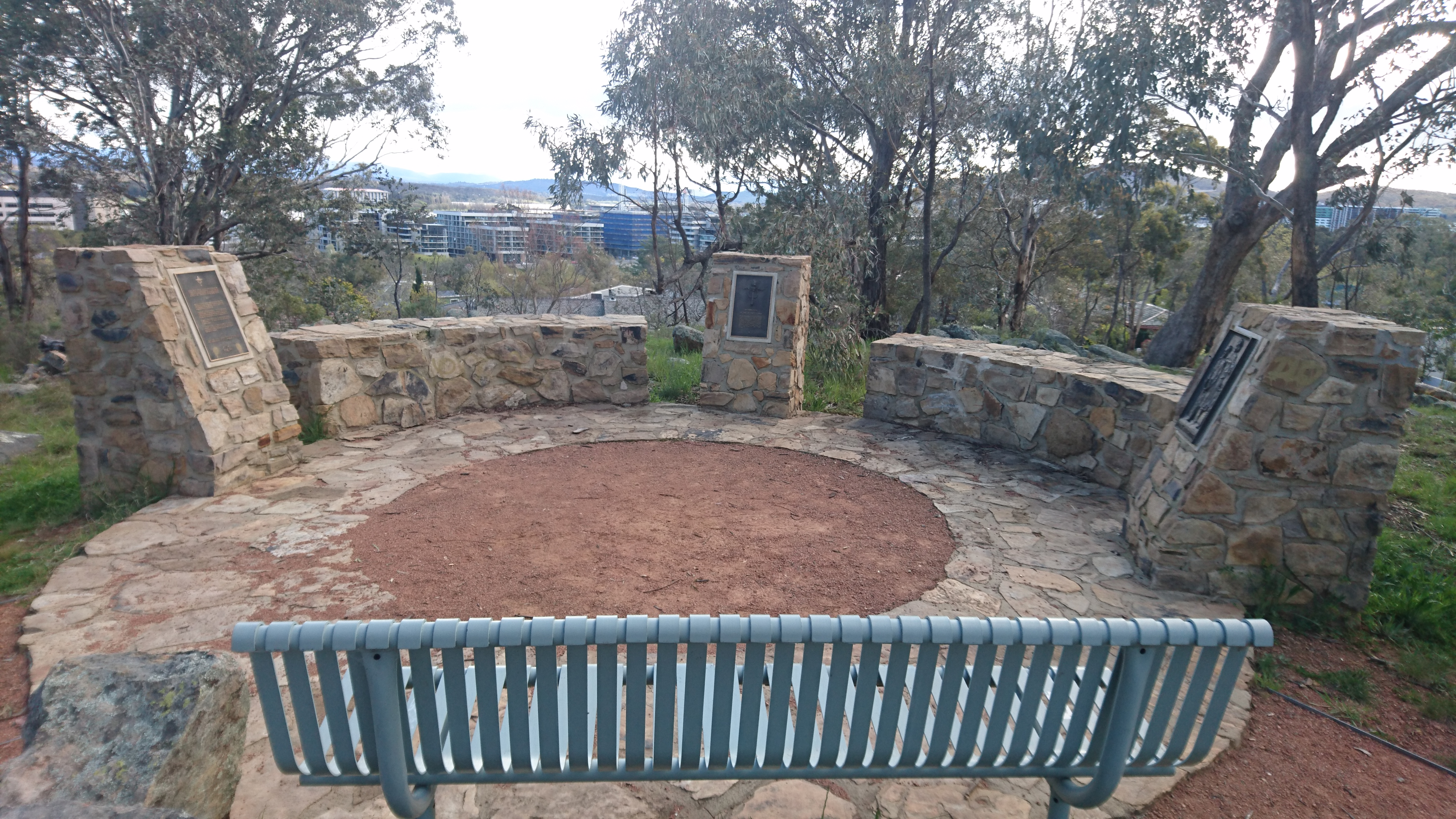
- Legacy Park Canberra - memorial

- Location within Australian Capital Territory
- Type: Memorial Park
- Nearest city: Campbell
- Coordinates: 35.2885°S 149.1493°E
- Created: 30 September 2001

Legacy Park Campbell is an urban memorial park in the suburb of western portion of Campbell, Australian Capital Territory, a short distance from the Australian Department of Defence headquarters at Russell Offices. It was officially opened on 30 September 2001, the 75th anniversary of Legacy Australia.

The memorial has a stone wall with three mounted bronze plaques, and a seat for visitors to contemplate the memorial. The approach to the memorial is by the loop walkway off Savige Street, Campbell, with concrete stepping stones every several metres, each mounted with the name of an Australian city or town and a piece of stone representing that city.

An Aleppo pine, a descendant of the original Lone Pine of Gallipoli, was planted in the park on 30 June 2006.

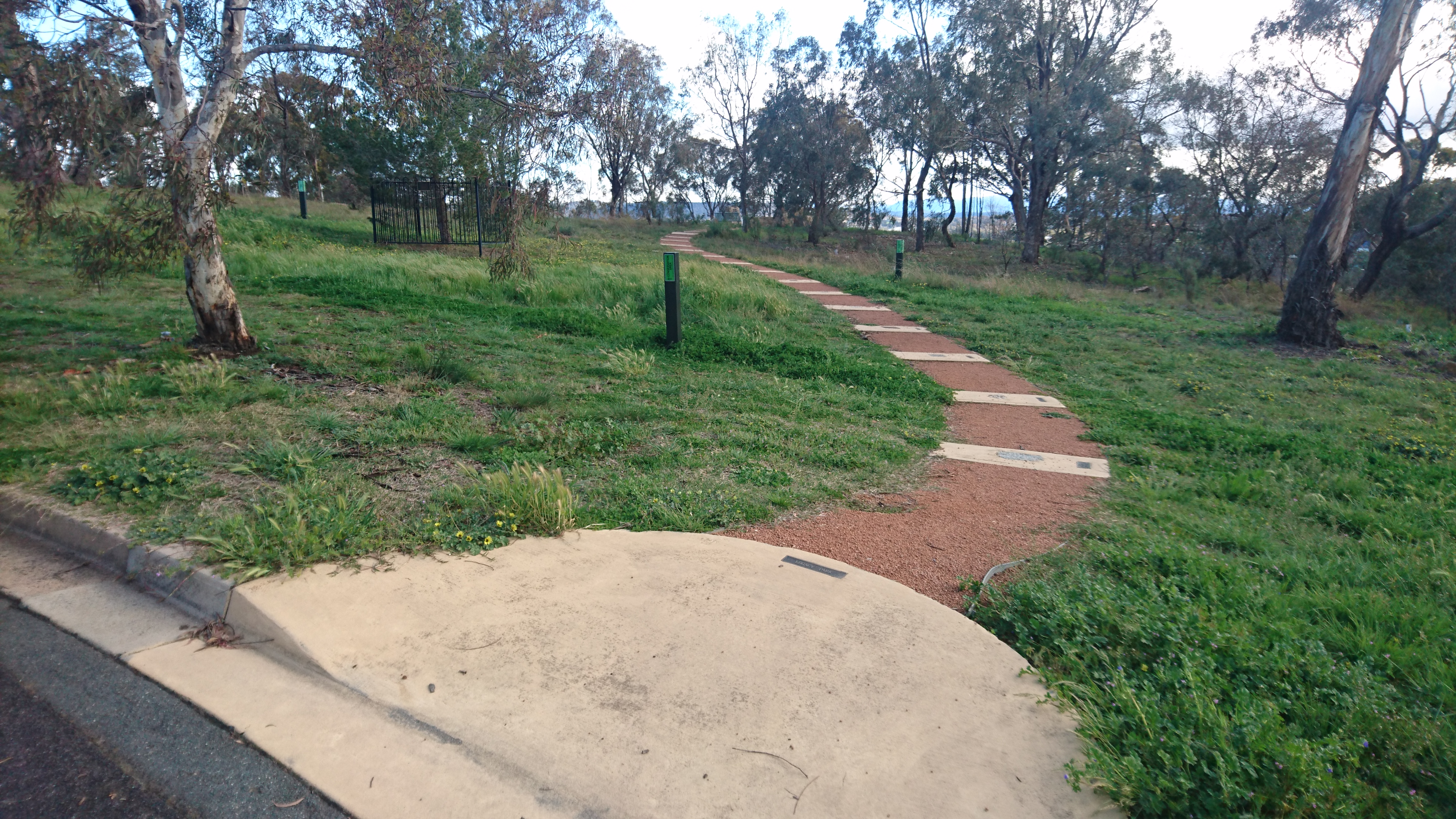
View from Savige Street

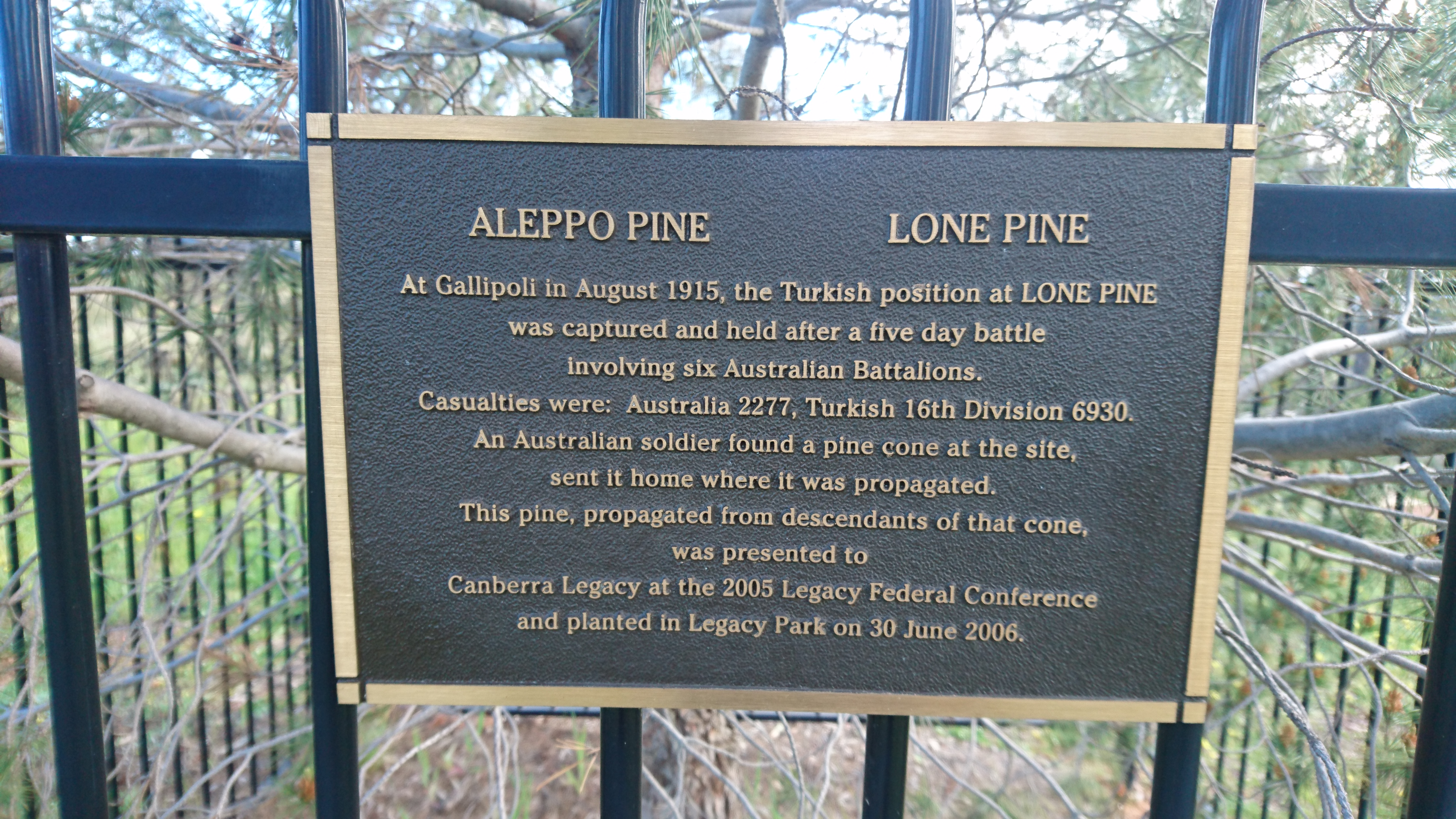
Sign on Lone Pine

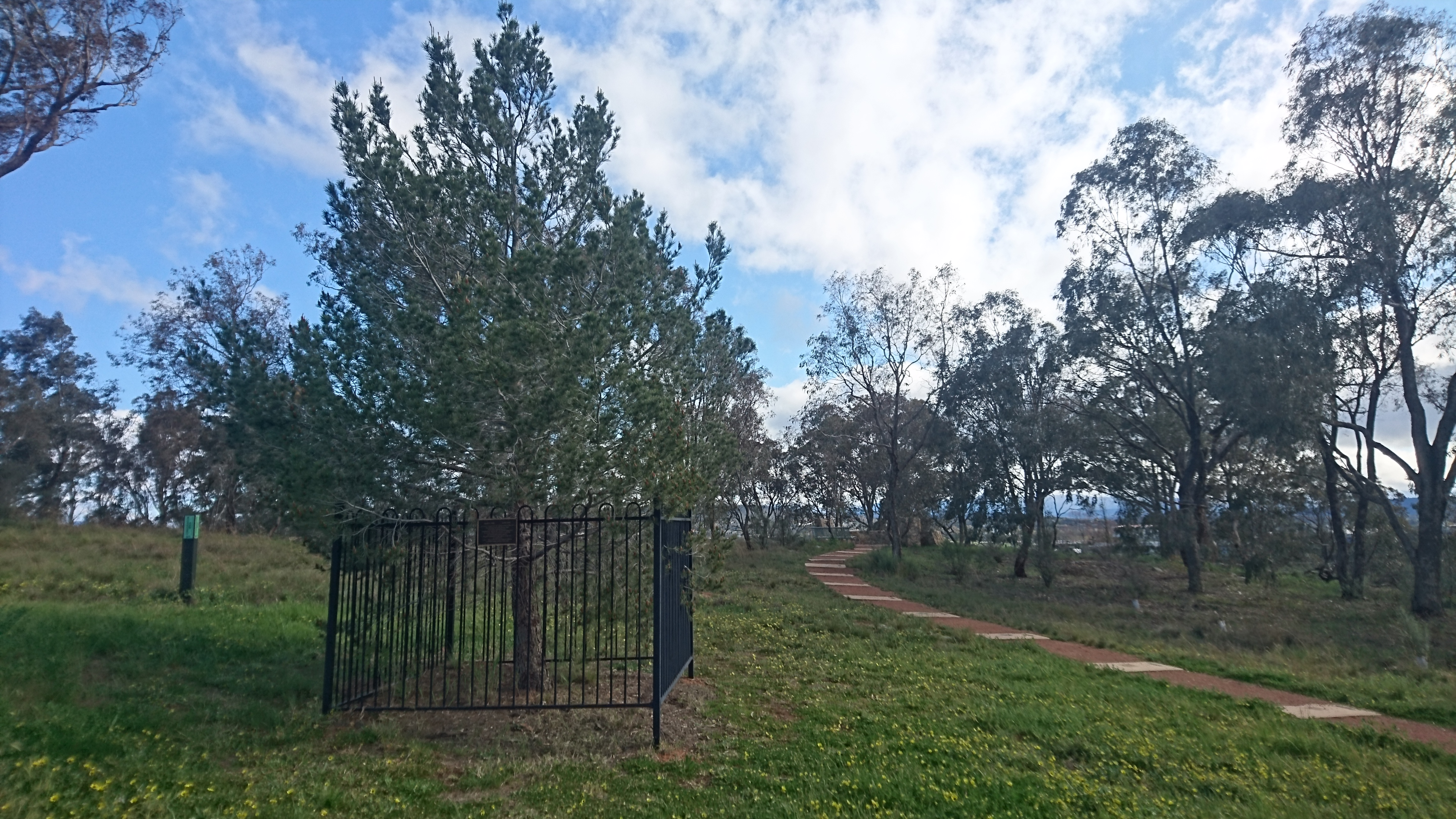
Lone Pine and memorial

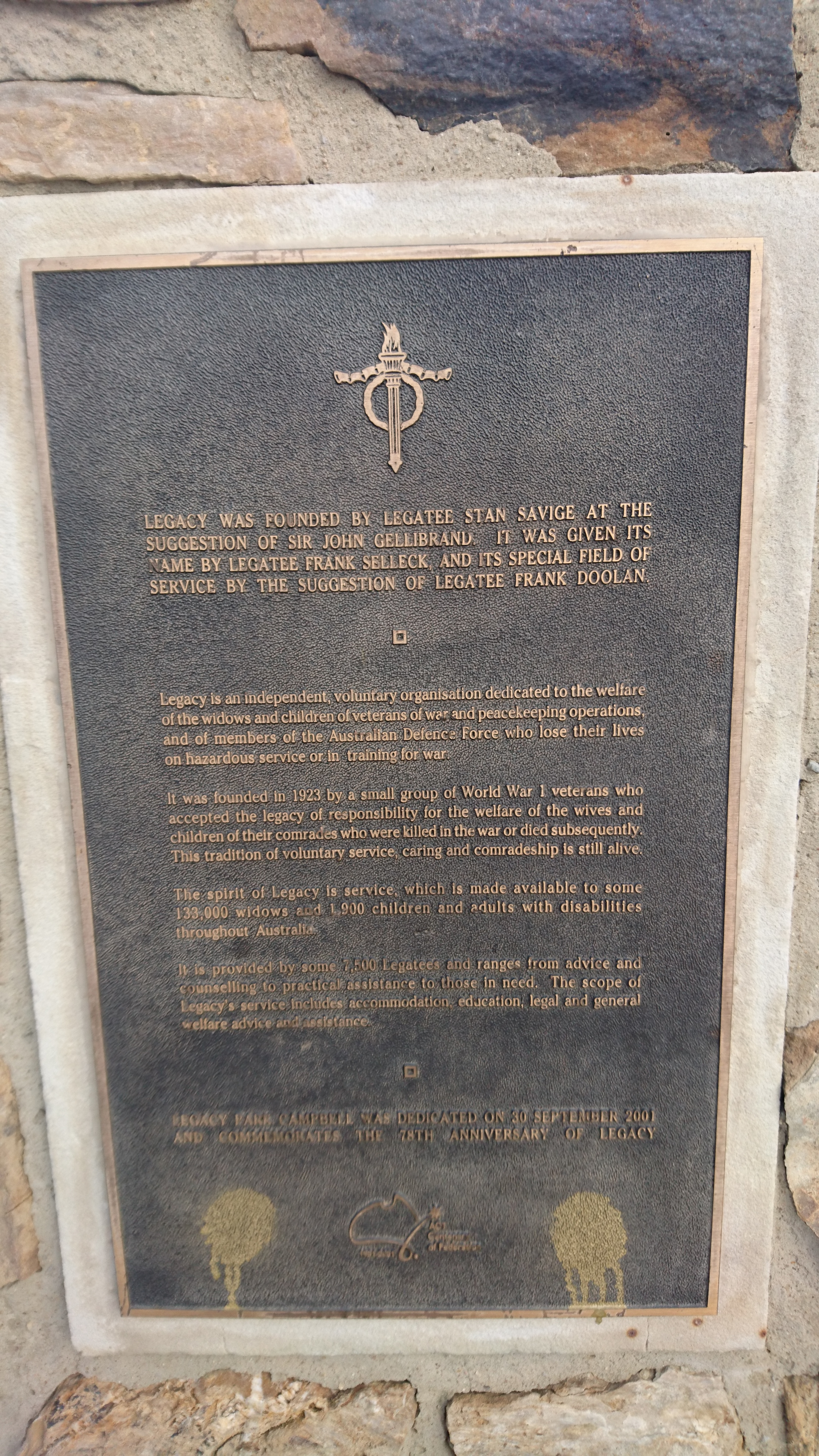
Left plaque

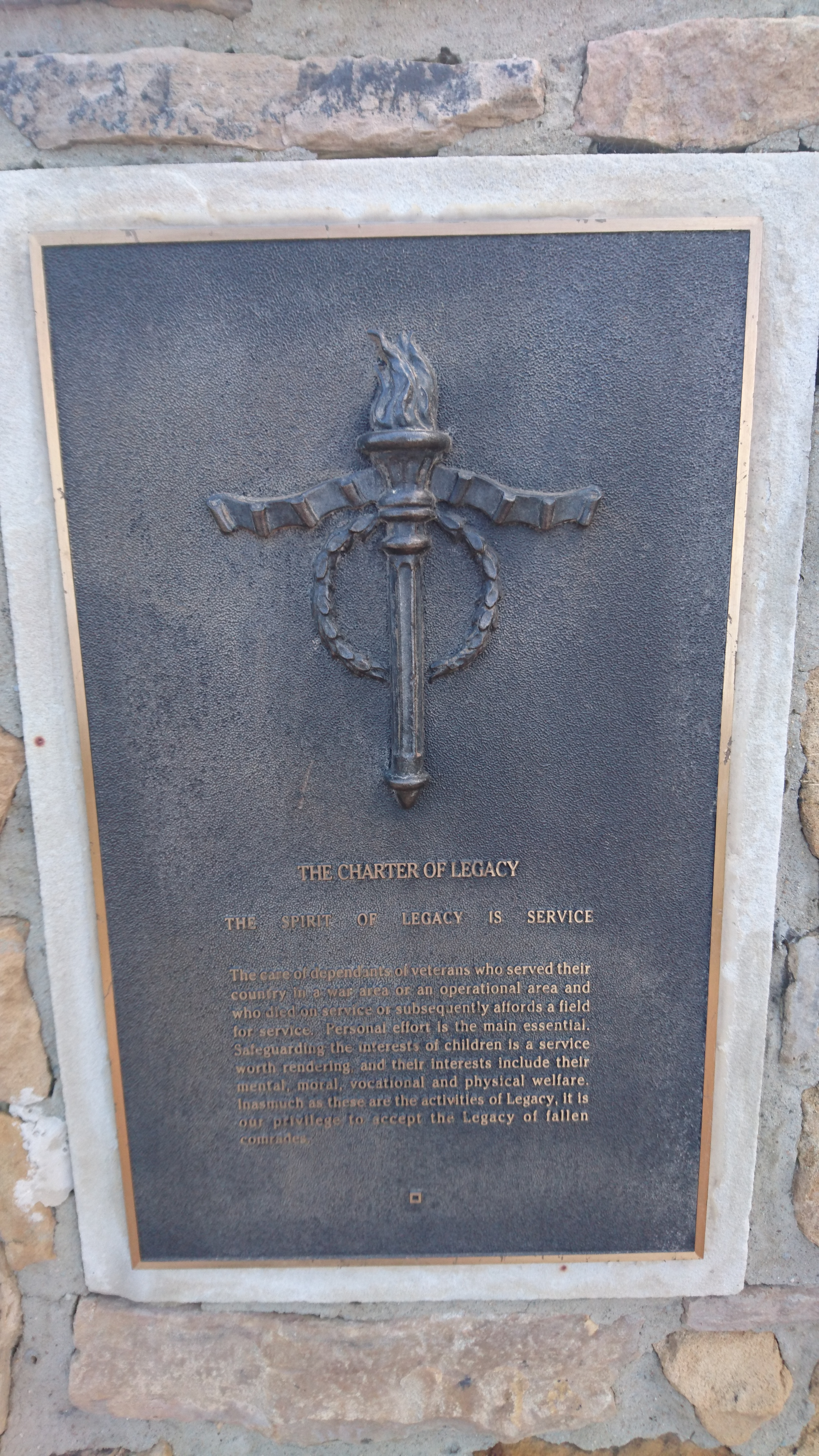
Centre plaque

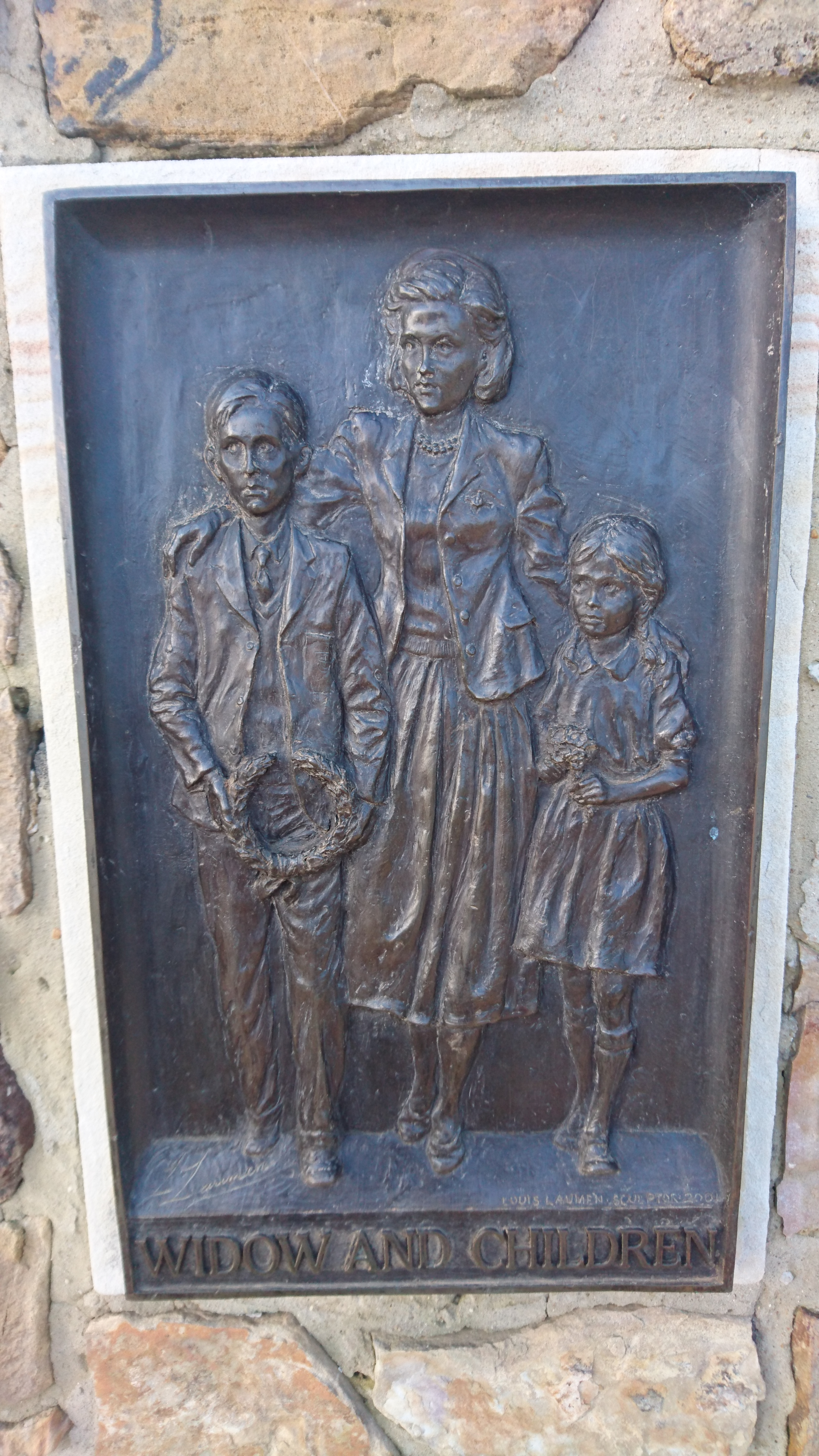
Right plaque

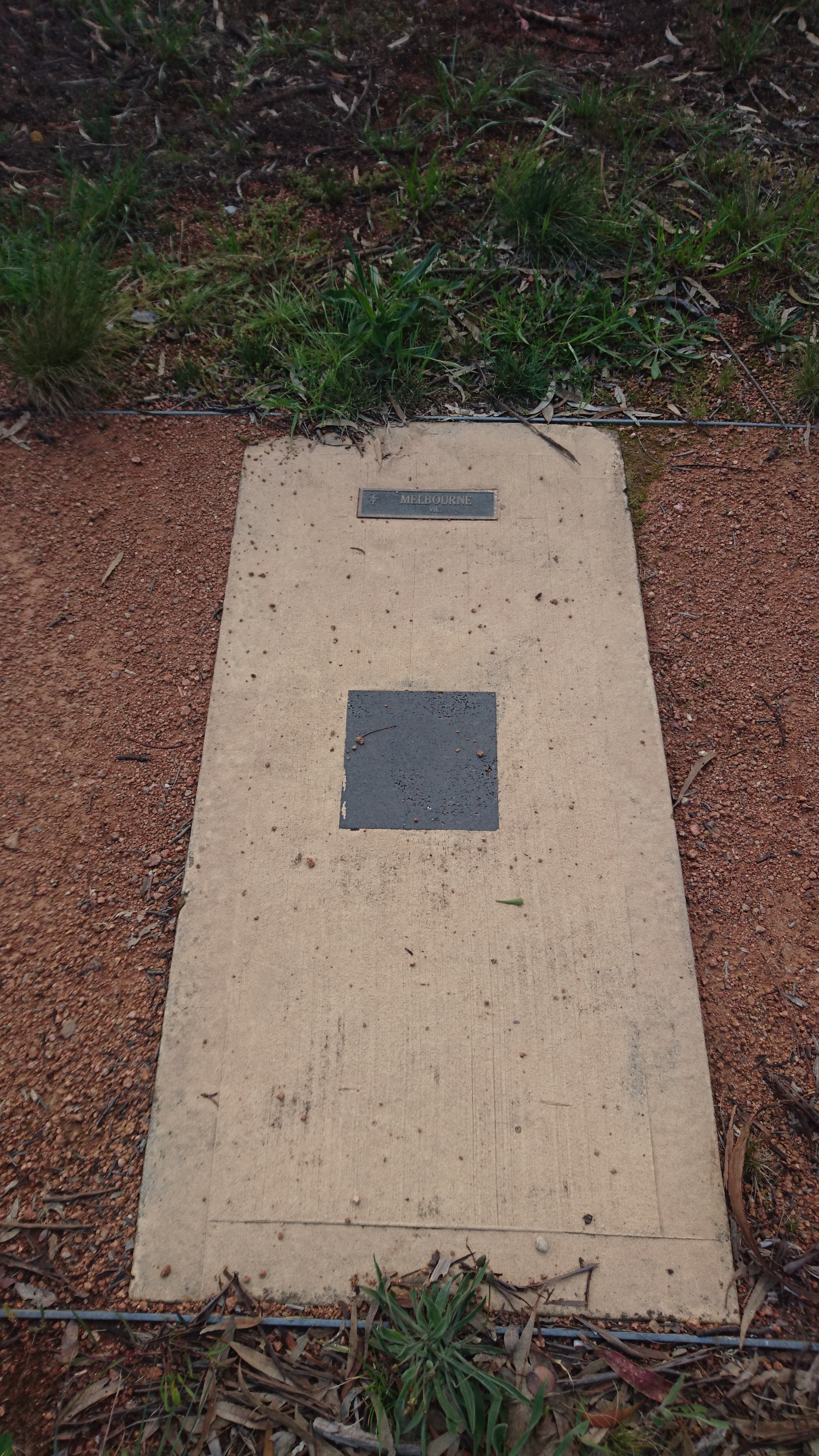
Path marker
