= Henry Thomas Windsor =

American postal pioneer (1796–1848)

- Born: 21 June 1796
- Died: 11 November 1848
- Occupation: Merchant
- Spouse: Elizabeth Jane "Eliza" Price

Henry Thomas Windsor (1796–1848) was the owner of "The City Despatch Post Company" of New York which issued the first Stamp in the USA. A black/grey three cent stamp depicting the head of George Washington.

Windsor was a merchant from London who was inspired by Rowland Hill's postal reforms in Great Britain including the issuing of the world's first stamp the Penny Black.

Windsor with his wife Elizabeth sailed from Liverpool in April 1841, reaching New York in May. Up to the autumn of that year he spent his time visiting friends in Boston and Baltimore. In travelling around he, who was familiar with the English postal system, was struck by the inefficiency and excessive charges of the local service. He decided as a business venture, to establish a private post in New York City.

While setting up and running the business he lived in Hoboken, New Jersey. He established the City Despatch Post on 1 February 1842, employing his friend Alexander M Greig from whose house they ran the business. They started operating during the first week of February 1842, in time for the busy Valentine season. A few months after founding the City Dispatch Post, Windsor sold it to the U.S. Government and the post became known as the "United States City Despatch Post." The government began operation of this local post on August 16, 1842. After the sale Windsor and his wife returned to London.

The 3-cent stamp issued City Despatch Post in 1842 was the first postage stamp issued in the Western Hemisphere. It followed Great Britain’s Penny Black and Two-Pence Blue by a mere 21 months and predated the U.S. 1845 Postmaster’s Provisionals, and 1847 General Issues by three and five years, respectively.

The stamps were engraved on steel by Rawdon, Wright & Hatch and printed in sheets of 42.

== See also ==
- Lysander Spooner
- American Letter Mail Company
- Postage stamps and postal history of the United States
