= History of United States postage rates =

Seal of the former U.S. Post Office Department (1792–1971), predecessor to the United States Postal Service

The system for mail delivery in the United States has developed with the nation. Rates were based on the distance between sender and receiver in the nation's early years. In the middle of the 19th century, rates stabilized at one price regardless of distance. Rates were relatively unchanged until 1968 when the price was increased every few years by a small amount. Adjusted for inflation, the cost of a first-class stamp has been steady. The seal of the Post Office Department showed a man on a running horse, even as railroads and, later, motorized trucks and airplanes moved mail. In 1971, the Post Office became the United States Postal Service, with rates set by the Postal Regulatory Commission, with some oversight by Congress. Air mail became standard in 1975. In the 21st century, prices were segmented to match the sorting machinery used; non-standard letters required slightly higher postage.

== Postal rates to 1847 ==
Initial United States postage rates were set by Congress as part of the Postal Service Act signed into law by President George Washington on February 20, 1792. The postal rate varied according to "distance zone", the distance a letter was to be carried from the post office where it entered the mail to its final destination. Rates were adopted in 1847 for mail to or from the Pacific Coast and in 1848 for mail sent from one place in the west to another place in the west. There were double and triple rates as a letter's size increased. Ship fees were also added (i.e., mail to Hawaii). The ship fee, including the ship rate on letters for delivery at the port of entry, were on a per letter basis, rather than weight. The United States issued its first postage stamps in 1847. Before that time, the letters' rates, dates, and origins were written by hand or sometimes in combination with a handstamp device.

== United States Postal Service ==
The Postal Reorganization Act of 1970 established the postage rates, which have been set by the Postal Regulatory Commission.

== Historical and current postage rates ==
United States domestic first-class & postcard rates, 1863–present (USD)
| Date Introduced | Letters (for first ounce) | Packages (for first ounce) | Additional (per ounce) | Postcard rate | International rate (letters) | Comments |
|---|---|---|---|---|---|---|
| July 1, 1863 | .06 (.03 for 1/2 oz) | .06 | .06 (.03 per 1/2 oz) | .06 | | .02 per half ounce in drop boxes |
| October 1, 1883 | .04 (.02 for 1/2 oz) | .04 | .04 (.02 per 1/2 oz) | .04 | | |
| July 1, 1885 | .02 | .02 | .02 | .02 | | |
| July 1, 1898 | .02 | .02 | .02 | .01 | | |
| November 2, 1917 | .03 | .03 | .03 | .02 | | Wartime Emergency Rate |
| July 1, 1919 | .02 | .02 | .02 | .01 | | Dropped back by Congress |
| April 15, 1925 | .02 | .02 | .02 | .01 (stamped cards).02 (postcards) | | |
| July 1, 1928 | .02 | .02 | .02 | .01 | | |
| July 6, 1932 | .03 | .03 | .03 | .01 | | |
| January 1, 1952 | .03 | .03 | .03 | .02 | | |
| August 1, 1958 | .04 | .04 | .04 | .03 | | |
| January 7, 1963 | .05 | .05 | .05 | .04 | | |
| January 7, 1968 | .06 | .06 | .06 | .05 | | |
| May 16, 1971 | .08 | .08 | .08 | .06 | | |
| March 2, 1974 | .10 | .10 | .10 | .08 | | |
| September 14, 1975 | .10 | .10 | .09 | .07 | | Last surface mail rate |
| December 31, 1975 | .13 | .13 | .11 | .09 | | All domestic first class & postcards by airmail |
| May 29, 1978 | .15 | .15 | .13 | .10 | | A Stamp Used |
| March 22, 1981 | .18 | .18 | .17 | .12 | | B Stamp Used |
| November 1, 1981 | .20 | .20 | .17 | .13 | | C Stamp Used |
| February 17, 1985 | .22 | .22 | .17 | .14 | | D Stamp Used |
| April 3, 1988 | .25 | .25 | .20 | .15 | | E Stamp Used |
| February 3, 1991 | .29 | .29 | .23 | .19 | | F Stamp Used (also 4 cent F makeup rate stamp) |
| January 1, 1995 | .32 | .32 | .23 | .20 | | G Stamp Used (also 3 cent G makeup rate stamp) |
| January 10, 1999 | .33 | .33 | .22 | .20 | | H Stamp Used (also 1 cent H makeup rate stamp) |
| January 7, 2001 | .34 | .34 | .21 | .20 | | Nondenominated Stamps Used |
| July 1, 2001 | .34 | .34 | .23 | .21 | | Nondenominated Stamps Used |
| June 30, 2002 | .37 | .37 | .23 | .23 | | Flag and Antique Toy Stamps Used |
| January 8, 2006 | .39 | .39 | .24 | .24 | | Lady Liberty Flag Stamp Used |
| May 14, 2007 | .41 | 1.13 | .17 | .26 | .69 (Can & Mex).90 (rest of world) | Shape-based postage pricing introduced; international surface rates were terminated. Forever stamps introduced; different prices for letters and packages for the first time |
| May 12, 2008 | .42 | 1.17 | .17 | .27 | .72 (Can & Mex).94 (rest of world) | Price change announced February 11, 2008 |
| May 11, 2009 | .44 | 1.22 | .17 | .28 | .75 (Canada).79 (Mexico).98 (rest of world) | Price change announced February 10, 2009 |
| April 17, 2011 | .44 | 1.71 (3 oz) | .20 (letters).17 (packages) | .29 | .80 (Can & Mex).98 (rest of world) | |
| January 22, 2012 | .45 | 1.95 (3 oz) | .20 (letters).17 (packages) | .32 | .85 (Can & Mex); 1.05 (rest of world) | |
| January 27, 2013 | .46 | 2.07 (3 oz) | .20 (letters).17 (packages) | .33 | 1.10 | Price change announced October 11, 2012; Canada & Mexico pay the same rate as the rest of the world |
| January 26, 2014 | .49 | 2.32 (3 oz) | .21 (letters).17 (packages) | .34 | 1.15 | Price change announced September 25, 2013 |
| May 31, 2015 | .49 | 2.54 (3 oz) | .22 (letters).20 (packages) | .35 | 1.20 | |
| April 10, 2016 | .47 | 2.54 (3 oz) | .21 (letters).20 (packages) | .34 | 1.15 | Price change announced February 25, 2016 |
| January 22, 2017 | .49 | 2.67 (3 oz) | .21 (letters).18 (packages) | .34 | 1.15 | Price change announced October 12, 2016 |
| January 21, 2018 | .50 | 3.50 (4 oz) | .21 (letters).35 (packages) | .35 | 1.15 | Price change announced October 6, 2017 |
| January 27, 2019 | .55 | | .15 (letters) | .35 | 1.15 | Price change announced October 19, 2018 |
| January 26, 2020 | .55 | | .15 (letters) | .35 | 1.20 | |
| January 24, 2021 | .55 | | .20 | .36 | 1.20 | Price change announced October 9, 2020 |
| August 29, 2021 | .58 | | .20 | .40 | 1.30 | USPS notice post-dated September 16, 2021 after effective increase date. |
| July 10, 2022 | .60 | | .24 (letters) | .44 | 1.40 | Price change announced April 6, 2022 |
| January 22, 2023 | .63 | 4.75-5.25 (zone-based) | .24 (letters) | .48 | 1.45 | Price change announced October 7, 2022; new non-machinable surcharge: 40 cents |
| July 9, 2023 | .66 | | .24 (letters) | .51 | 1.50 | Price change announced April 10, 2023 |
| January 21, 2024 | .68 | | .24 (letters) | .53 | 1.55 | Price change announced October 6, 2023 |
| July 14, 2024 | .73 | | .28 (letters) | .56 | 1.65 | Price change announced April 9, 2024 |
| July 13, 2025 | .78 | | .29 (letters) | .61 | 1.70 | Price change announced April 9, 2025 |
| July 12, 2026 | .82 | | .29 (letters) | .65 | 1.75 | Price change announced April 9, 2026 |

== Historical trend ==
Actual and inflation-adjusted first-class postage rates in the U.S.

Plotting the data in the previous table yields the adjacent graph. The dark area shows the actual price of the stamp, while the light area shows the price adjusted for inflation in 2019 U.S. cents.

This plot shows that, despite the nominal rise in the price of a first-class stamp, the inflation-adjusted real cost of a stamp has stayed relatively stable. Since at least the early 1980s, the price of a stamp has closely followed the consumer price index. The large jumps in the early 1900s are because a change by a single penny was large compared to the price of the stamp. For example, the price increase from $0.02 to $0.03 on July 6, 1932, was a 50% increase in price.

== Historical notes ==
Domestic parcel post service was adopted in 1913, 25 years after the Post Office had agreed to deliver international parcel post packages pursuant to the Universal Postal Union treaty and various bilateral agreements with other nations:

"The establishment of parcel post in 1913 had a tremendously stimulating effect on the national economy; it opened a world of opportunities for both farmers and merchants alike."

Initially, only some postal regulations governed packages mailed by parcel post. For example, to construct a bank in Vernal, Utah, in 1916, a Salt Lake City company ascertained that the cheapest way to send 40 short tons (36 t; 36,000 kg) of bricks to the building was by parcel post, and the company proceeded to do so. For another example, Charlotte May Pierstorff, then a 48.5-pound (22.0 kg) five-year-old, was mailed via parcel post in 1914; she survived, but the regulations were clarified to prohibit the use of parcel post for human transport.

Bulk postal rates were restructured in 1996:

- Second Class became Periodicals
- Third and Fourth Class Mail became Standard Mail (A) and (B)
- Special Fourth Class Mail was renamed Special Standard Mail

In 2007, First Class Mail was restructured to include variable pricing based on size, not just on weight. Shape-based postage pricing is a form of dimensional weight. Also, at that time, the International Parcel Post air service was re-branded as Priority Mail International, and the Parcel Post surface service was discontinued for international destinations.

Regular Air Mail service began in 1918; over the years, rates varied considerably depending on distance and technology. Domestic Air Mail, as a class of service, officially ended May 1, 1977. By then, all domestic First Class Mail was being dispatched by the most expeditious means, surface or air, and whether or not the Air Mail postage had been paid.

Additional charges for Special Delivery existed from 1885 to 2001. Today, Express Mail Overnight is the most similar service level.

During the summer of 2010, the USPS requested the Postal Regulatory Commission to raise the price of a first-class stamp by 2 cents, from 44 cents to 46 cents, to take effect January 2, 2011. On September 30, 2010, the PRC formally denied the request, but the USPS filed an appeal with the Federal Court of Appeals in Washington DC.

On September 25, 2013, the USPS announced a 3-cent increase in the First Class postal rate, effective January 26, 2014, increasing the price of a stamp to 49 cents. Bulk mail, periodicals, and package service rates were also increased by 6 percent. A loss of US$5 billion during the 2013 fiscal year was the reason given for the increase.

The legislation which set the price to 49 cents was enacted as a temporary measure and as an "exigent surcharge for mailing products and services". However, this legislation was set to expire in April 2016. As a result, the Post Office retained one cent of the price change as a previously allotted adjustment for inflation, but the price of a first-class stamp became 47 cents: for the first time in 97 years (and for the fourth time in the agency's history) the price of a stamp decreased.

=== Recent history of first-class increases ===
The United States Postal Service proposed a price increase for Forever stamps in July 2025, raising the cost from 73 to 78 cents. This follows an increase in July 2024 and marks the seventh increase since January 2021. Despite these ongoing price hikes, the United States maintains relatively inexpensive postage compared to other developed countries. A 2024 study by the USPS Inspector General found that the U.S. had a lower stamp price than 26 out of 30 comparable countries. Additionally, the overall increase in stamp prices from June 2018 to June 2023 (26%) was significantly lower than the average increase of 55% experienced by those same countries.

A major factor driving the price hikes for first-class mail in the United States is a decline in mail volume. Since 2007, the number of mailed items has decreased by 68%. This decline is attributed to the rise of digital communication methods, such as email and social media, which have significantly reduced reliance on traditional mail services. The USPS attempts to offset these financial losses through price adjustments to first-class mail, including Forever stamps.

== See also ==
- United States postal abbreviations
- United States Postal Service creed

Unions of the U.S. Postal Service:

- American Postal Workers Union
- National Association of Letter Carriers
- National Postal Mail Handlers Union
- National Rural Letter Carriers' Association

History:

- Post Office Murals
- American Letter Mail Company
- Postage stamps and postal history of the United States of America

== Sources ==
- First Class Mail Prices, 2010
- Rates for Domestic Letters Since 1863
- Rates for Stamped Cards and Postcards
- Consumer Price Index data
- Nondenomination Stamps FAQ
- Paying the Postage in the U.S., 1776–1921
- USPS Price List Notice 123
