= American Letter Mail Company =

US mail company (1844–1851)

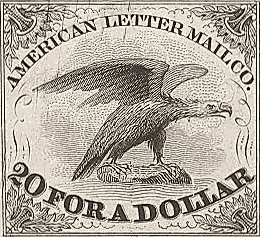
- The American Letter Mail Company stamp of 1844
- Industry: Courier
- Founded: 1844
- Defunct: 1851
- Fate: Outlawed by Private Express Statutes
- Headquarters: USA New York
- Key people: Lysander Spooner

The American Letter Mail Company was an American mail company started by Lysander Spooner in 1844 to compete against the legal monopoly of the United States Post Office (now the United States Postal Service). It went defunct in 1851 after being outlawed by Private Express Statutes.

== History ==
Spooner started the service out of frustration with exceedingly high postal rates. At the time, it cost 18 3/4 cents to send a letter from Boston to New York and 25 cents to send one from Boston to Washington, DC. A letter sent from Boston to Albany, New York, written on a 1/4-ounce sheet of paper and carried by the Western Railroad, cost 2/3 as much as the freight charge for carrying a barrel of flour the same distance.

Spooner's justification was that the Constitution provided for a government-run postal service, but did not exclude others from engaging in the same business. Spooner dropped his rates even lower, delivering many letters for free. This competition dropped prices dramatically with postage of 6 1/4 cents per each half-ounce and stamps 20 for a dollar. Deliveries were made twice daily between New York City and Philadelphia. The US Government tried to lower prices by threatening railroads to withdraw business. However, the U.S. Government challenged Spooner with legal measures whereby Spooner was initially vindicated. In fact, the U.S. Circuit Court expressed doubt that the U.S. had the right to monopolize the transportation of mail.

Congress eventually forced him to cease operations in 1851 by legislating a US monopoly.

== Overview ==
According to John Bach McMaster, the company had offices in various cities, including Baltimore, Philadelphia, and New York. In February 1844, Spooner advertised rates of "Postage 6 1/4 cents for each half oz. ... Stamps, twenty for a dollar." He further stated, "The Company design also (if sustained by the public) thoroughly to agitate the question, and test the constitutional right of free competition in the business of carrying letters." Stamps could be purchased and then attached to letters which could be sent to any of its offices. From there, agents were dispatched who traveled on railroads and steamboats and carried the letters in handbags. Letters were transferred to messengers in the cities along the routes who then delivered the letters to the addressees.

== Competition with the U.S. Post Office Department ==
Spooner's intentions were founded on both an ethical perspective, as he considered government monopoly to be an immoral restriction, and an economic analysis, as he believed that five cents were sufficient to send mail throughout the country. From its inception, the Company was a vehicle for legal challenge. "Mr. Spooner, the head of the American Letter Mail Company, has transmitted to the Department at Washington, a written admission of his conveyance of letters, &c., with all the necessary facts in the case, to make it a purely legal question, so that the Postmaster General has nothing to do but take the whole subject to the Supreme Court of the United States, as soon as it can be got there." The American Letter Mail Company was able to reduce the price of its stamps significantly and even offered free local delivery, significantly undercutting the Post Office Department. The federal government treated this as a criminal act:

United States v. John C. Gilmore—This was action instituted by the Government of the United States, to recover the sum of $50 for an alleged violation of the laws regulating the Post Office Department, embodied in the act of Congress of 1825...

Calvin Case, another of the persons alleged to be in the office, or connected with "Postmaster General Lysander Spooner's American Letter Mail Company," was arrested and held to bail in the sum of $100, by the United States Marshal, in [Philadelphia], on Friday, on the ground of conveying letters contrary to the laws of Congress.

Although the business was forced by the U.S. Government to close shop after only a few years, it succeeded in temporarily driving down the cost of government-delivered mail.

== See also ==
- History of United States postage rates
- Henry Thomas Windsor
