= Private cancellation =

Cancellation of a postage stamp

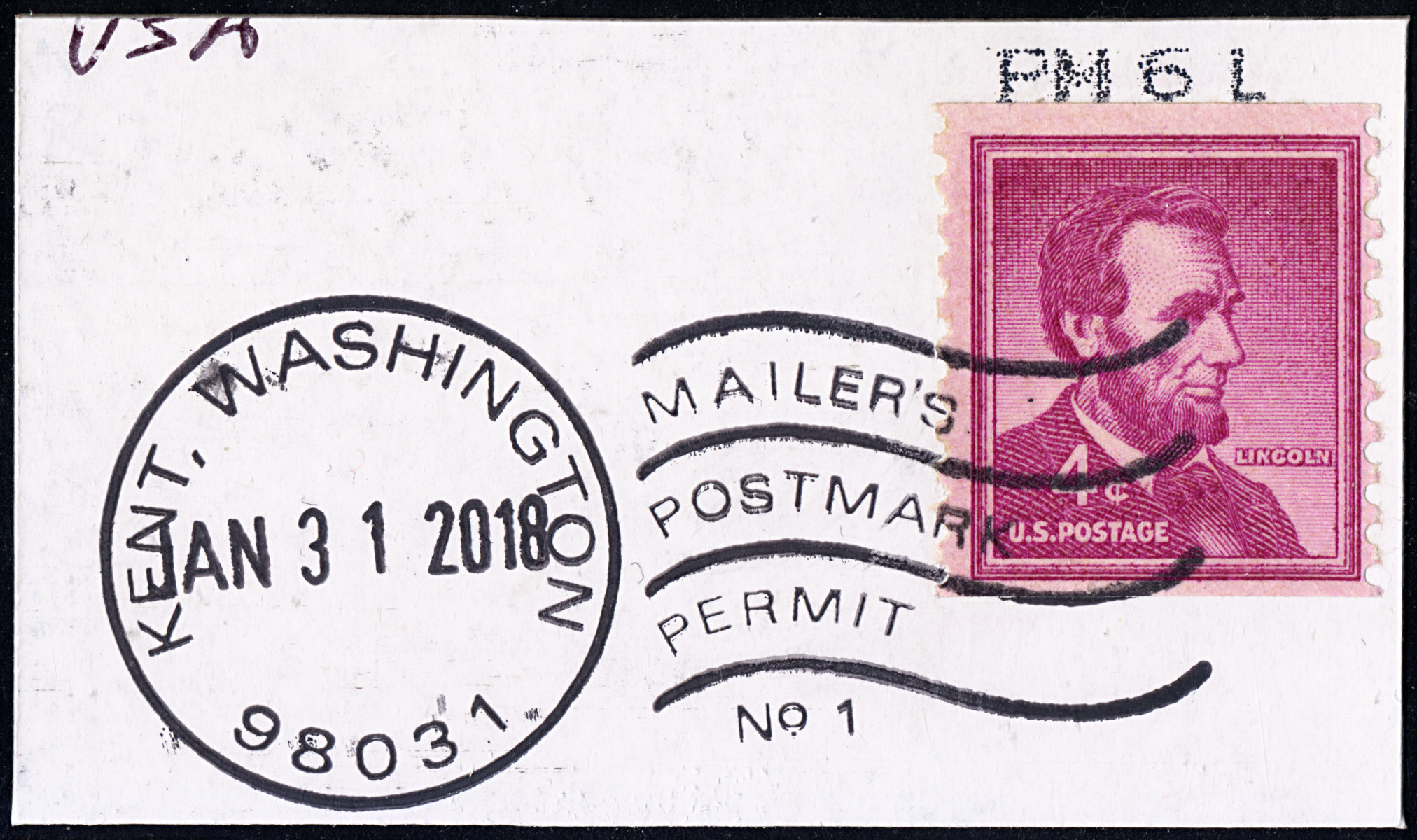
US private cancellation, Kent, Washington, January 31, 2018

Private cancellations are cancellations of postage stamps, or in some cases, artist stamps applied by other than a government or other official stamp-issuing entity.

== In the United States ==
Private postmarks are commonly used with private postal meters. They are also occasionally used to create "first day of issue" items for personalized U.S. postage (officially defined as meter labels and thus not requiring cancellation). Private cancellations are often applied by local posts to their stamps (this is frequently also the first day of issue).

Another type of private cancellation, used in the United States, is the Mailer's Postmark Permit, by which license-holders can cancel their own mail under certain conditions. They can in the U.S. be applied to mail carried outside the post by authority of the private express statutes. An example of this is the Chickensville, Michigan private cancellation, applied to mail carried, although Chickensville does not have a post office.

Private postmarks have also been used as back-stamps showing the name of the firm from which the mail was sent.

=== United States taxation ===
In the United States if the time of posting is significant and there is both a private and regular cancellation, the regular cancellation controls. Private postmarks are not considered valid in some other cases.
