= Private overprint =

Overprints applied by non-postal sources

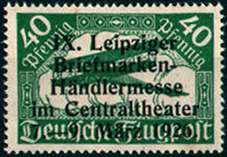
A 1926 German private commercial overprint for IX Leipziger Briefmarken-Handlermesse.

In philately, private overprints or commercial overprints are overprints applied to postage stamps, postal stationery or revenue stamps by anyone other than the official stamp-issuing entity. These overprints have principally been used as a security measure, however, propaganda and commemorative examples are also known. When overprinted for security purposes, they serve a similar function to perfins. It is important to distinguish between private overprints and private cancellations.

== Background ==
Private overprints have been used for a number of reasons. Generally they cannot be used as control marks, as the stamp or stamps are thus rendered invalid for prepayment of postage (though some such invalid stamps have successfully passed through the mails, presumably due to an oversight of postal employees). However, while in Great Britain privately overprinted stamps usually served as receipts for tax payments, in 1859, upon application of the Oxford Union Society, there was a unique instance of a private overprint being approved for application on the face of stamps. This is to be distinguished from the more or less frequent application of private overprints to the back of stamps as control marks.

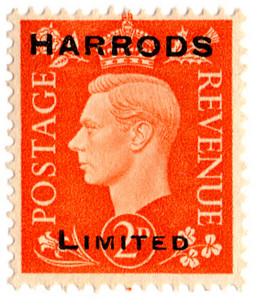
A commercial overprint of Harrods Limited on a British 2d stamp of 1938.

In Great Britain, commercial overprints were principally used to pay the tax on receipts and are found on both revenue and postage stamps with a great number of different varieties known between the 1880s and 1970s.

Other countries which had commercial overprints include Canada, Ceylon, India, Kenya & Uganda, New South Wales, New Zealand, South Africa, Spain, the Straits Settlements and Victoria.

Private overprints can also originate from speculative philatelic purposes produced deliberately with a view to selling them to unsuspecting collectors.

== Political causes ==
Private overprints have been used to express political opinions, or to commemorate events by creating collector's items in cases in which the overprinted stamps cannot be used. For instance, German sympathisers in the Sudetenland privately overprinted Czechoslovak stamps with swastikas before the annexation, and in Italy, after the fall of Mussolini and his establishment of the Italian Social Republic, stamps of the King were overprinted with fasces by Fascist sympathizers.

== In the United States ==
Private overprints have also been used in the United States, though the Domestic Mail Manual states that stamps "overprinted with an unauthorized design, message or other marking" are not valid for postage. A private overprint exists on the Florida commemorative, and during the Vietnam War, a woman privately overprinted the stamps on her outgoing mail with the slogan "Pray for War" before postal authorities compelled her to move this stamping away from the stamps. There have been several American examples of postal cards being overprinted with a private overprint revaluation shortly after a rate change, including the Post Office Department's authorization of a special Pitney-Bowes Tickometer surcharge to be used to revalue postal cards in the possession of General Electric when the postcard rate went up to 3 cents in August 1958. The USPS also authorised overprinting of the 10¢ Tractor Trailer and 5¢ Canoe Transportation coil stamps.

== See also ==
- Perfin
- Underprint

== References and sources ==
Sources

- GBOS. "Bogus overprints." Website Great Britain Overprints Society. Online article
