= Grecian Guild Pictorial =

Magazine

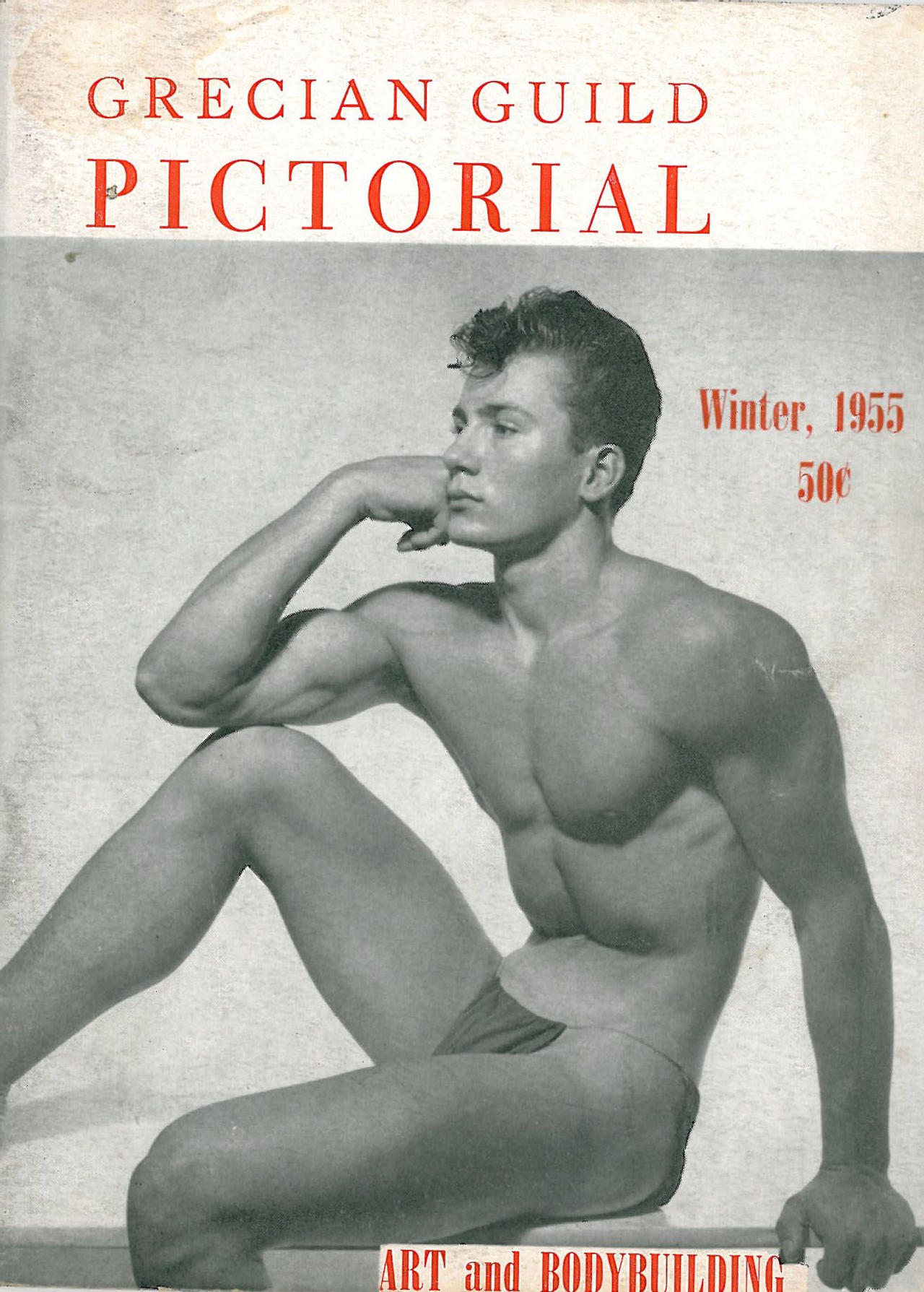
- A cover of Grecian Guild Pictorial from its first year
- Categories: Physique magazine
- Format: digest size
- Publisher: Guild Press
- First issue: 1955
- Final issue: 1968
- Language: English
- OCLC: 18564261

Grecian Guild Pictorial was an American physique magazine published from 1955 until 1968. While ostensibly dedicated to art, health, and exercise, like other physique magazines of the time, it was understood that, in practice, its homoerotic photography and illustrations were almost exclusively created by and for gay men. It differed from other physique magazines in its focus on themes and imagery from Ancient Greece, which was seen by many as a coded reference to homosexuality. It has been described as one of the "gayer" of the physique magazines.

It was one of three magazines at the centre of the landmark 1962 Supreme Court case Manual Enterprises, Inc. v. Day, which found that photographs of nude men were not obscene.

Its main supplier of photos was Bob Mizer's Athletic Model Guild.

The magazine was known for featuring relatively young, slim models, as opposed to the muscular bodybuilders featured in more conservative magazines like Tomorrow's Man. This was mocked by competitor Vim in 1955, which complained that the average model in Grecian Guild Pictorial look like an "undernourished prisoner in concentration camp begging for a crust of bread."

Robert Mapplethorpe, famed for his photography of the male nude, had his first exposure to Hellenistic art and themes, which he would later incorporate into his own photography, from Grecian Guild Pictorial. Mapplethorpe also created a photo-transfer collage using the cover of a 1964 issue of the Pictorial.

Grecian Guild Pictorial was the first magazine to publish artwork by MATT, then 16 years old.

== Background ==
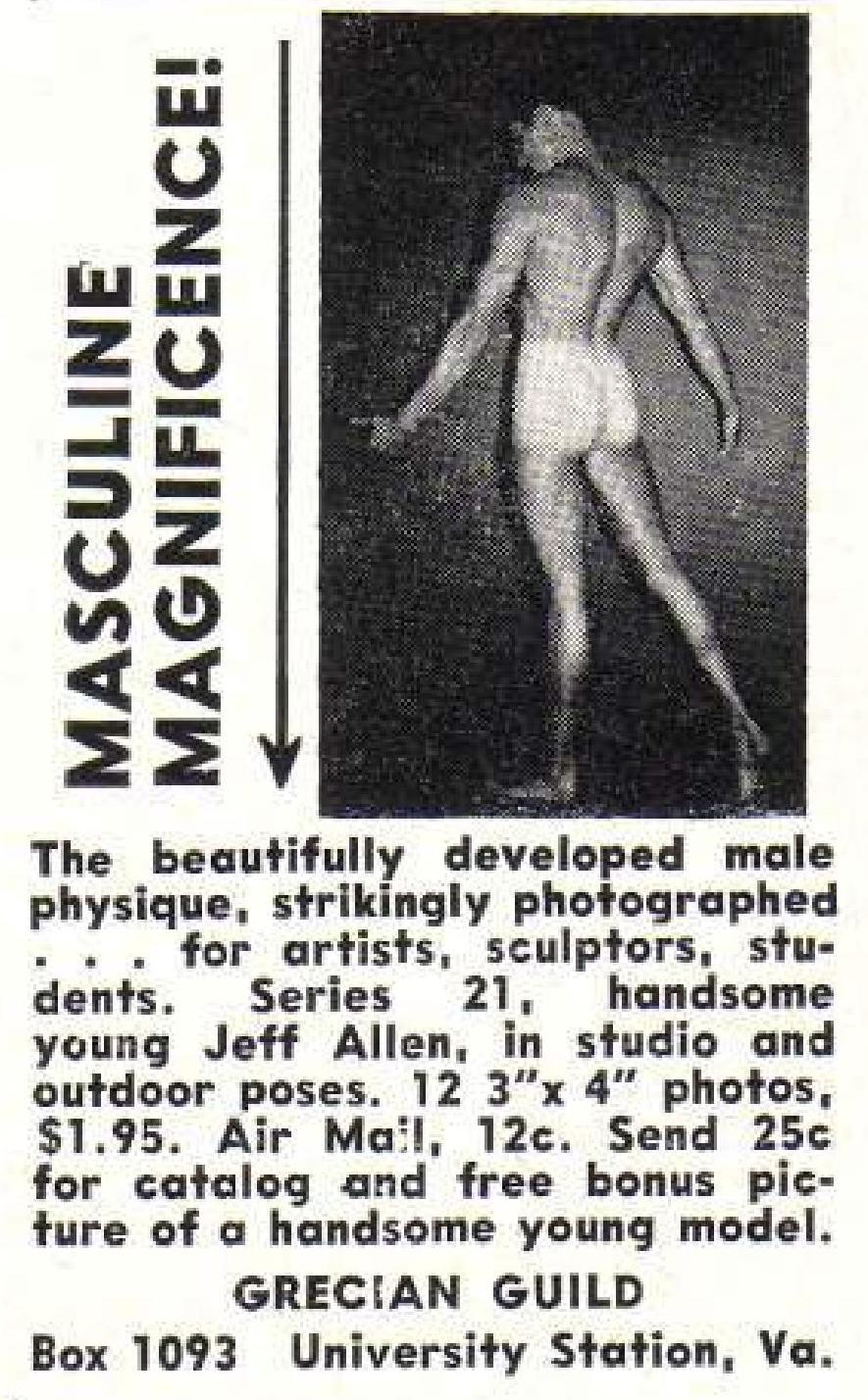
A 1953 ad in Tomorrow's Man for the Grecian Guild, the physique studio from which Grecian Guild Pictorial would later develop

The magazine was founded by Randolph Benson and John Bullock, a gay couple who had met at the University of Virginia in 1947. The two founded a small studio devoted to physique photography in 1953, advertising their work in physique magazines Tomorrow's Man and VIM. The studio distinguished itself from others by using students from the University of Virginia rather than bodybuilders. The studio was founded in Charlottesville, but Benson and Bullock moved to South California before entering the magazine business.

== Publication history ==
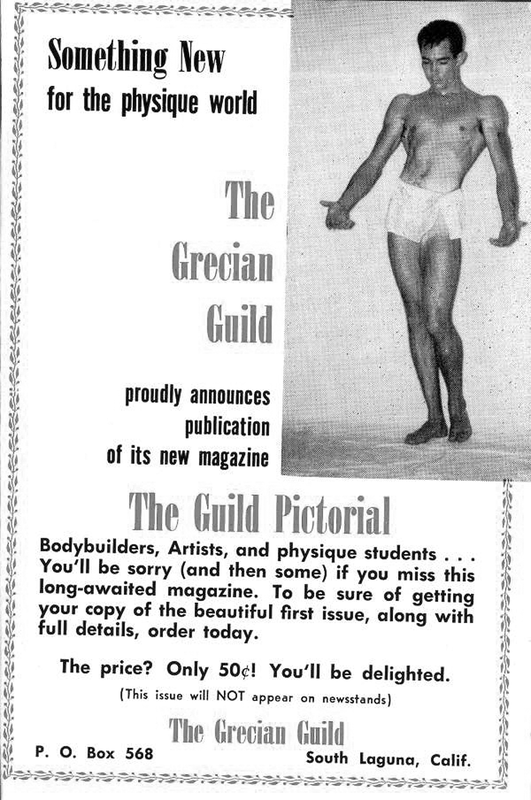
An ad in the August 1955 issue of VIM magazine advertising the debut of Grecian Guild Pictorial. The man depicted is cofounder John Bullock.

The success of the Grecian Guild physique studio led Benson and Bullock to launch their own magazine in 1955. They placed a two-page advertisement for the upcoming magazine in the August issues of Tomorrow's Man and VIM, and the first issue of Grecian Guild Pictorial was published in autumn of 1955. The first issue was available by subscription only, but the magazine was later offered at newsstands. Benson was listed as the magazine's "Publications Director", and Bullock as "Art Director".

The magazine rapidly gained popularity, and its publication schedule was accelerated from quarterly to bimonthly. Within the magazine's first year, Benson and Bullock claimed they were printing 25,000 copies per issue, and outselling all other physique magazines of the time. At its peak, in the late 1950s, it claimed an estimated 75,000 readers.

Benson and Bullock aspired to create a connected national membership organization with regular conventions, though they failed to realize this goal. They organized a single convention in 1958, but only 16 members attended.

By 1960, Benson and Bullock had sold the magazine to Lynn Womack. Historian David K. Johnson speculates that the two were forced out of business because of legal troubles stemming from a crackdown on physique photographs by Postmaster General Arthur Summerfield.

== Grecian imagery and themes ==
The cover of the first issue of Grecian Guild Pictorial showed the head of Myron's sculpture of a discus-throwing youth against a pink background. Early issues contained a number of commentaries on Greek statuary, and editorial content frequently expressed an admiration of Ancient Greek society, which was "wiser and more sophisticated" than today, and where "the body of a muscular, graceful, well-proportioned youth was among the most admirable of all things." In his views on homosexuality and Ancient Greece, Benson was influenced by Sexual Life in Ancient Greece by German scholar Paul Brandt, which was then the most authoritative source on homosexuality in the ancient world; Benson often quoted Brandt in the editorial content he wrote for Grecian Guild Pictorial.
