= Al Urban (photographer) =

American physique photographer

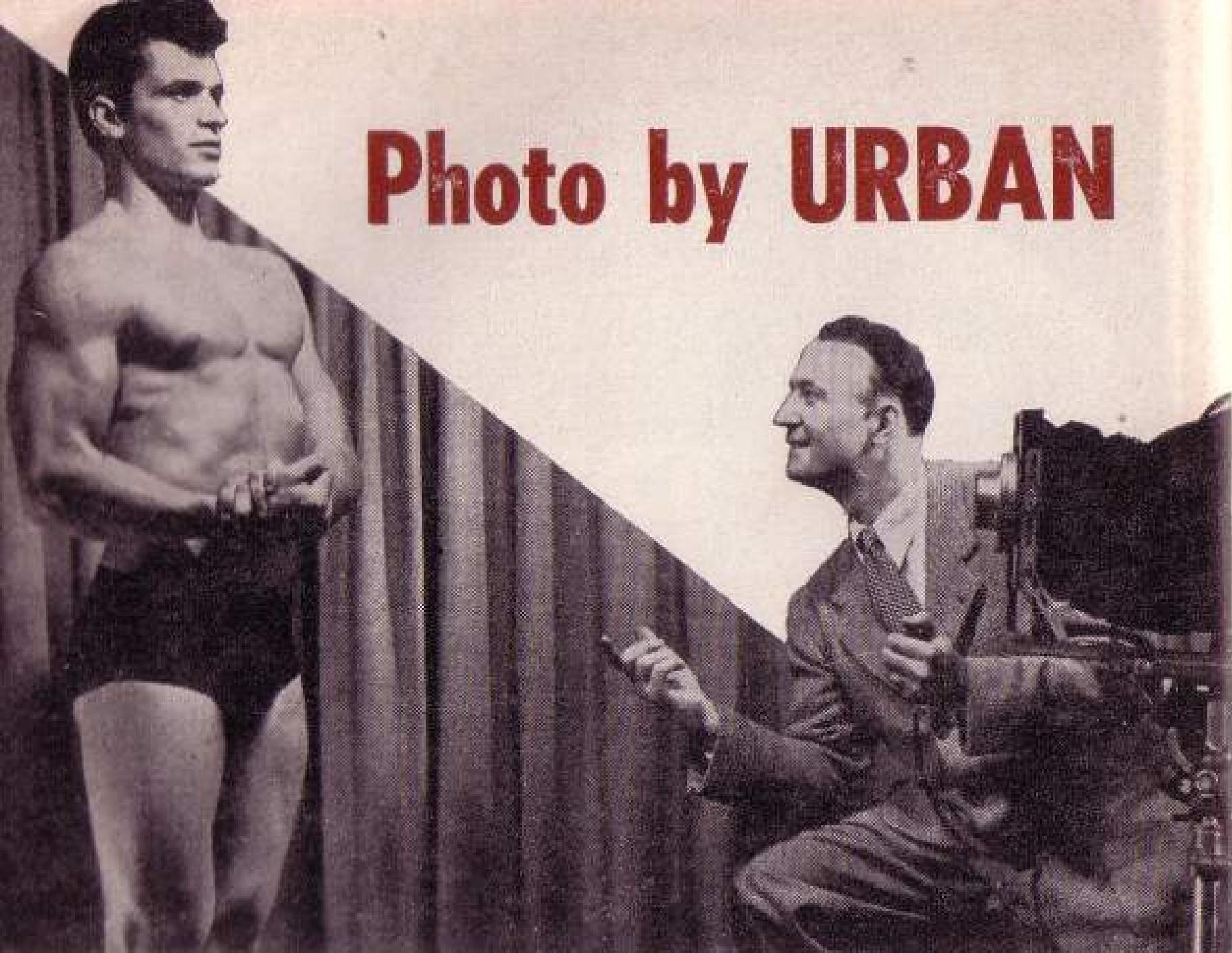
Urban (right) in his photography studio with model Jimmy Stergiou in 1953.

Albert J. Urban, Jr. (1917-1992) was an American physique photographer. His work appeared widely in physical culture and physique magazines of the 1940s and 1950s. Scholar Thomas Waugh described Urban as one of the "pillars of the postwar golden age of gay physique culture".

== Biography ==
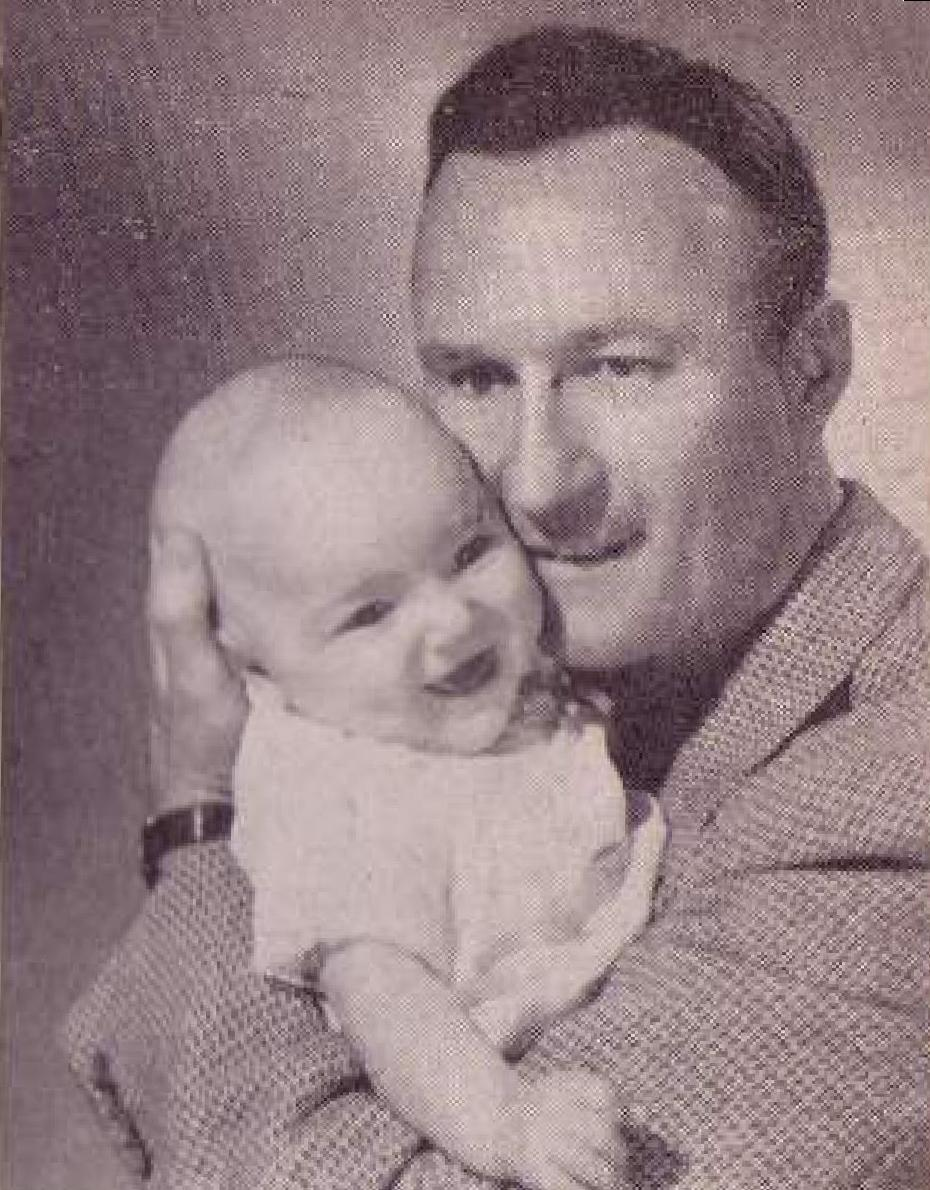
A photo captioned "Urban and daughter" from a 1953 profile in Tomorrow's Man.

Little is known of Urban's upbringing or personal life. According to an article in the Chicago Daily News, he attended St. Benedict's Preparatory School in Newark, New Jersey, and played on the basketball team.

A profile of Urban in a 1954 issue of Tomorrow's Man includes a photo of Urban with his daughter, though nothing more is known of her or of Urban's marital history.

Urban, like most of the prominent photographers of the physique era, was gay.

He lived and operated out of New Jersey and New York for most of his life, with brief periods spent in Chicago and Hollywood.

== Photography ==
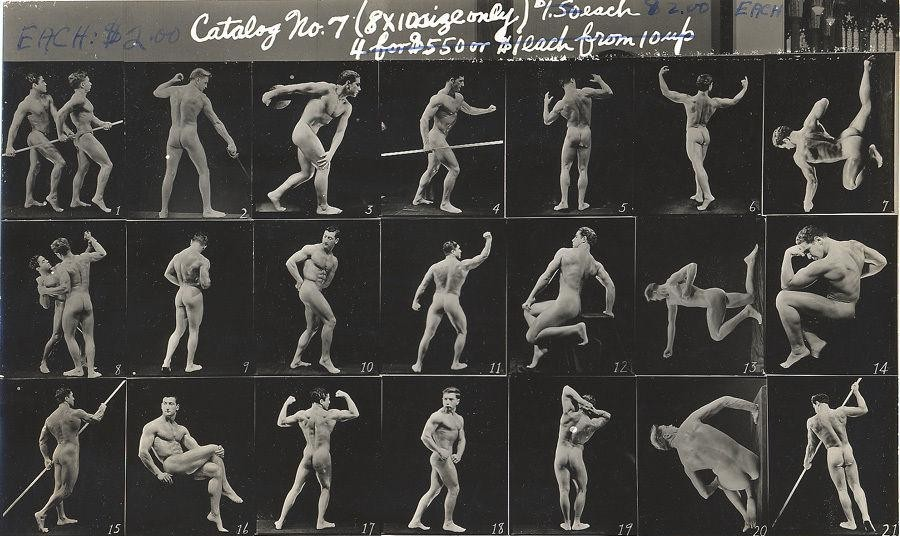
A catalogue of Urban's photos offered at a price of $2 each. Urban advertised these catalogues in magazines like Strength & Health.

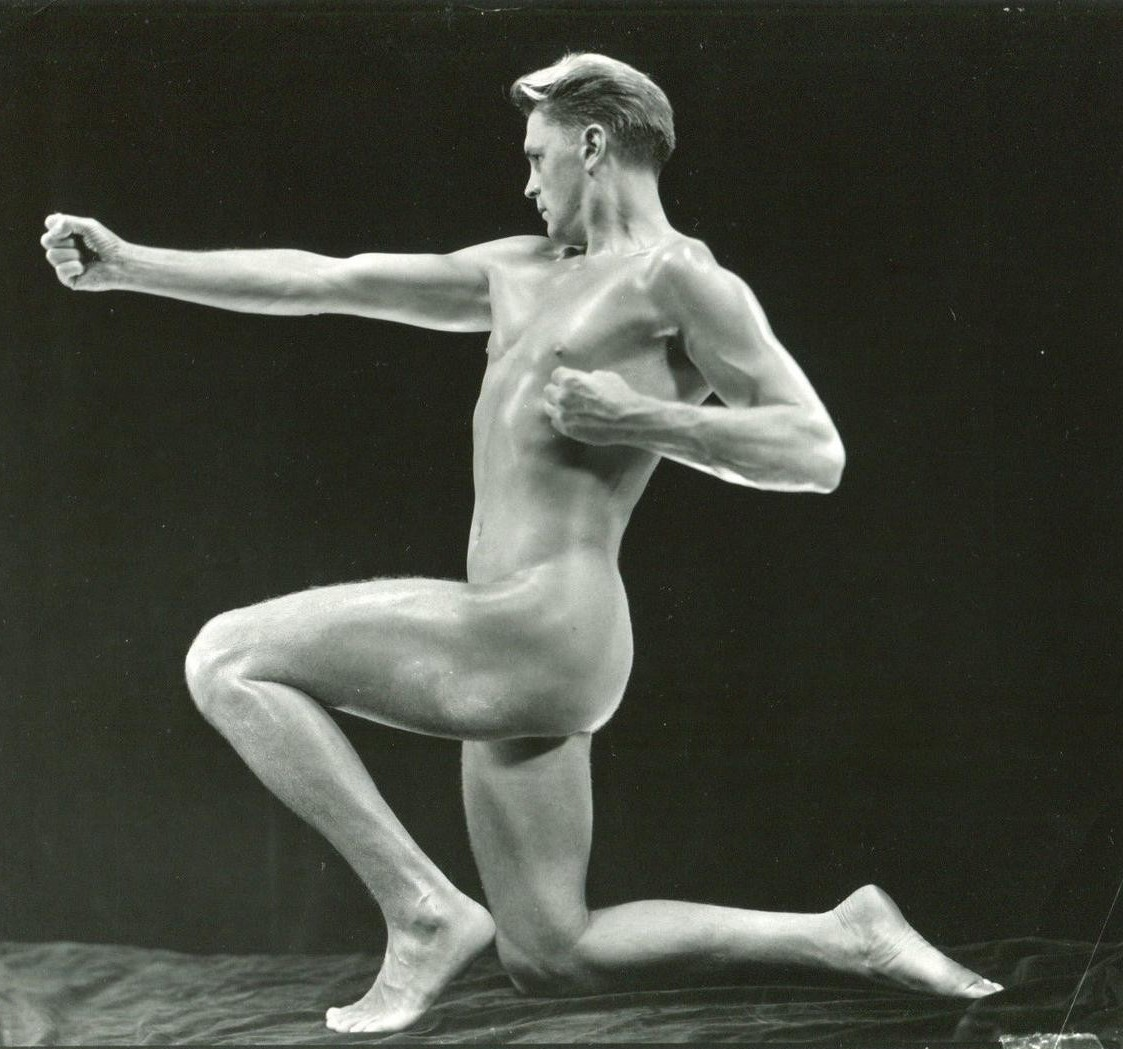
A full print purchased from the above catalogue (number 13), depicting a nude man in a classical "archer" pose.

Urban began his career as a commercial photographer. In 1937, he began advertising his physique photographs in the back pages of Strength & Health magazine. At the time, Urban shot mostly nude photographs. The catalogue sheets sent to customers were doctored with "inked-in" posing straps, but these would be omitted from full-sized prints purchased from the catalogue.

Urban's photography appeared in the first issues of Bob Mizer's Physique Pictorial in 1951, the first of a wave of physique magazines showcasing physique photography and aimed at a homosexual audience. In the magazine's second issue, dated November 1951, Urban announced he would be publishing his own physique magazine, though it failed to materialize.

Urban's career effectively ended with his final criminal conviction in 1960, which resulted in a one-year sentence and the seizure of most of his work, however he was seen to be advertising in magazines as late as 1963.

== Legal troubles ==
Like many physique photographers, Urban faced recurring legal troubles in relation to obscenity laws. In 1947, he was arrested and jailed for sending nude photographs through the mail, a violation of the Comstock laws. In 1956, he was prosecuted again and given a $5,000 fine and a 20-year suspended sentence, which he successfully appealed. On July 1, 1960, Urban's studio was raided by police, who seized his negatives and prints and charged him with possession of obscene materials. Urban succeeded in having the possession charge overturned on appeal, after having already served three months of hard labor. He continued to fight to have his negatives returned to him, and wrote to customers seeking donations to fund his legal case. In 1963, the physique magazine MANual, published by Lynn Womack's Guild Press, printed an "Urgent Appeal" to its readers on Urban's behalf, referring to him as the "dean" of American physique photography.

== Later life and legacy ==
According to writer Reed Massengill, Urban became reclusive during the last years of his life, living on welfare support in California.

Much of Urban's work was lost in police raids. Urban entrusted what remained to a friend, Dominic X. Mondella. The materials were ultimately acquired by the Doan Foundation, which published a book on Urban's work.
