= Neel Bate =

Gay male erotic artist

- Born: Carlyle Kneeland Bate; November 29, 1916; Canada
- Died: June 27, 1989 (aged 72); New York City
- Other names: Blade
- Occupation: artist
- Years active: 1930s–80s
- Notable work: The Barn

Neel Bate (1916–1989), also known as Blade, was an American underground artist known for his gay erotic art. He is best known for his 1948 series of drawings The Barn. He began drawing erotica in the 1930s and continued for most of his life. His work was initially distributed underground due to American obscenity law. In the 1970s, his drawings began to be published in gay magazines, and, during the last decade of his life, exhibited in art galleries.

== Biography ==
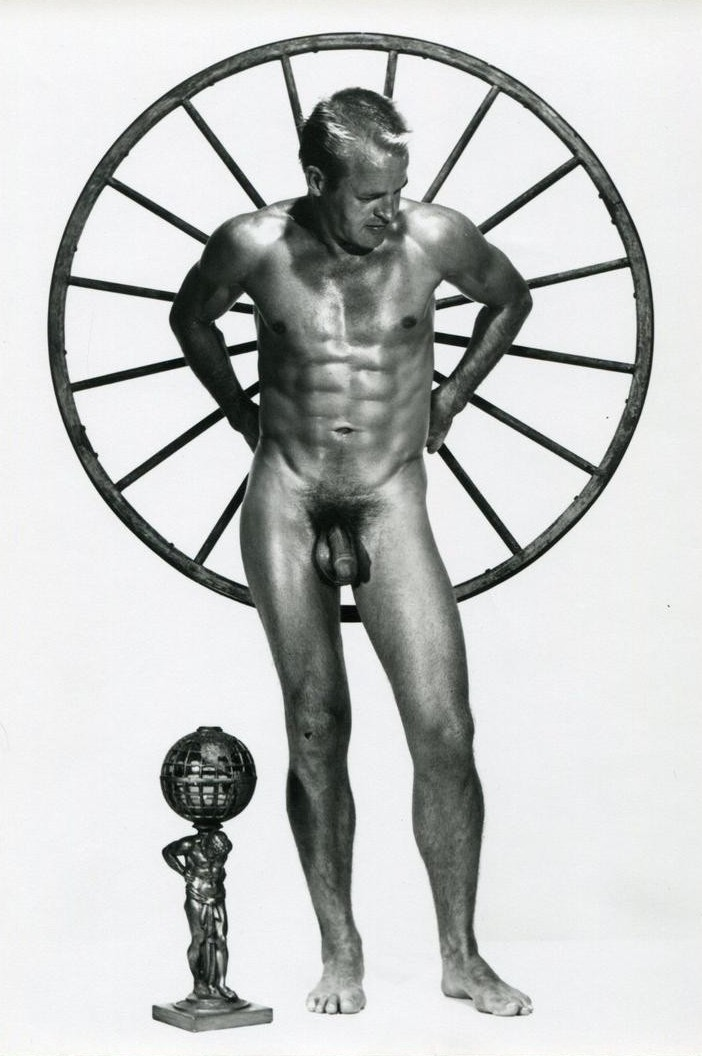
After the war, Bate posed sporadically for physique photographers such as Russ Warner, who took this photo of Bate around the late 1940s or early 1950s.

Bate was born Carlyle Kneeland Bate in Canada on November 29, 1916. His family moved to the rural outskirts of Seattle soon after his birth. After high school, he studied art at Seattle's Cornish School, but dropped out before completing his degree. He worked as an illustrator in California, and later as a designer in Hollywood. Bate was gay and had sexual encounters with other men as part of the nascent, underground gay community that existed in Hollywood at the time.

Bate enlisted in the Merchant Marines during World War II.

After the war, Bate moved to New York City, where he lived until his death. He worked as a designer, whilst also selling his artwork and occasionally modeling for physique photos.

Bate was friends with other early gay artists and photographers including Bob Mizer, George Platt Lynes, Harry Bush, and Tom of Finland.

In the early 1950s, Bate began a relationship with physique model Ernest Henry, and the two moved in together. Their relationship later became platonic, but they continued to live together until Bate's death.

Bate was a heavy smoker, and died of emphysema on June 27, 1989.

== Work ==
The subjects of Bate's drawings were often working class men (such as farmboys, truckers, or sailors), who have been described as "gritty", or "burly". A recurring theme was young men having their first homosexual experience with an older, more experienced man.

Before joining the Marines in World War II, Bates burned all his drawings, fearing that they would be discovered. More of his work was also lost in an armed robbery at his apartment in the late 1950s or early 1960s.

His work was initially sold through underground channels, but in the mid 1970s, it began to appear (under the pseudonym Blade) in the new explicitly gay publications of the time, which cropped up as successors to the physique magazine.

Bate wrote an article for the gay magazine In Touch For Men (reprinted in The Advocate in 1983) about the short-lived 1937 magazine Bachelor, which he recalled as his first exposure to gay-coded media.

=== The Barn ===
One of the drawings from Bate's The Barn series (1948), depicting an encounter between a farmboy (left) and a motorcyclist (right).

The Barn was a series of ink drawings with captions telling the story of a sexual encounter between a motorcyclist and a farmboy when the former takes shelter from the rain in a barn. A small number of prints were made by Bate's friend George Platt Lynes, and given to a gay bartender to be sold clandestinely. The prints were seized in a police raid, but in the following years, copies came to be widely circulated underground, even internationally. It has been speculated that a member of the police department began the spread of pirated copies. Reproductions of the drawings, along with Bate's original storyline, are reconstructed in the publication, The Barn 1948 and Other Dirty Pictures by Blade (New York: Stompers and the Leslie-Lohman Gallery, 1980.)

== Legacy ==
The majority of Bate's originals have been destroyed. His surviving work was donated to the Leslie-Lohman Museum of Art.
