= Alonzo Hanagan =

American photographer (1911–1999)

Lon Hanagan
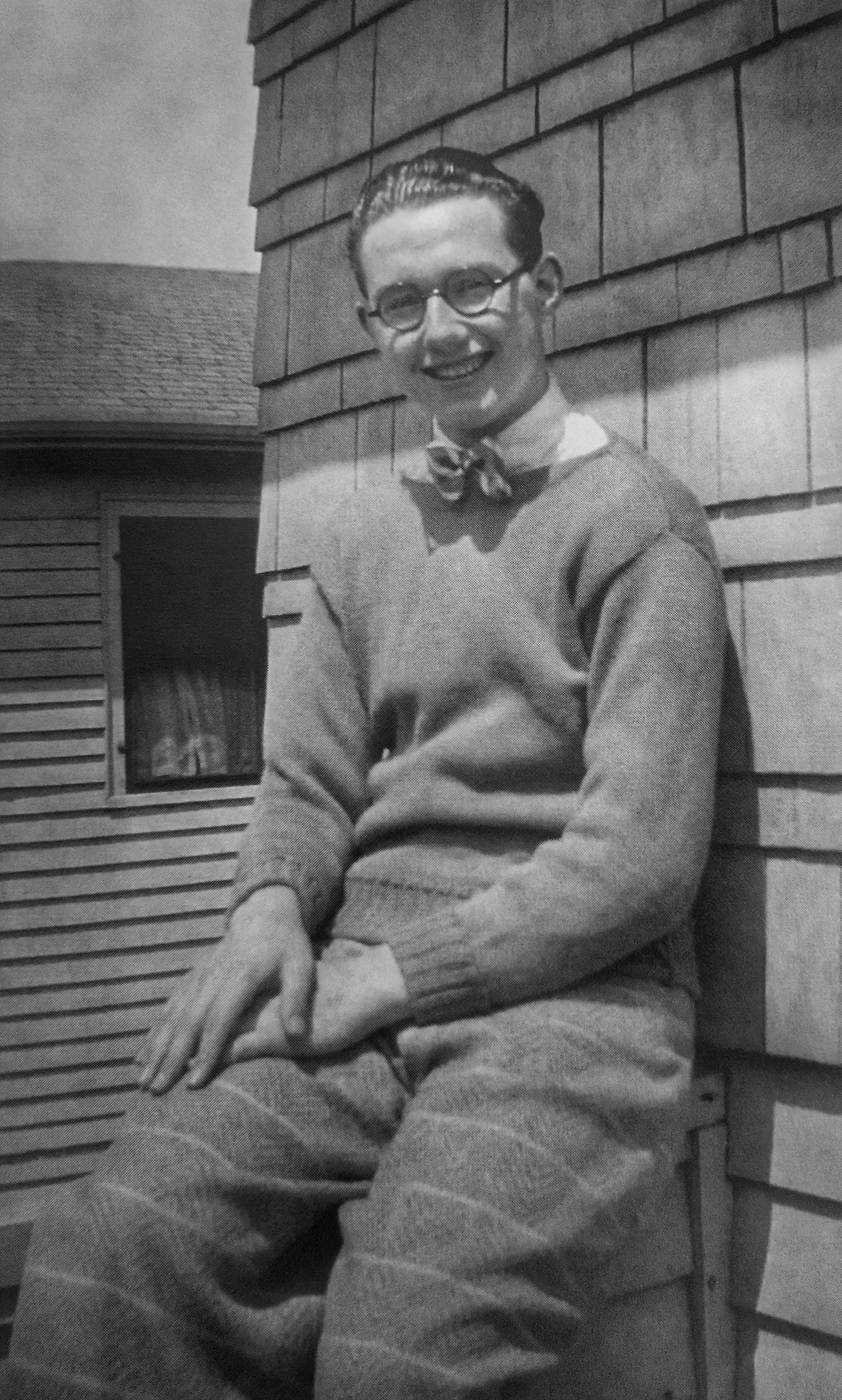
- Teenager Lon
- Born: Alonzo James Hanagan; December 20, 1911; Lexington, Massachusetts, U.S.
- Died: December 4, 1999 (aged 87); Lenox Hill Hospital, Manhattan, New York, U.S.
- Movement: Physique photography

Alonzo "Lon" Hanagan (December 20, 1911 – December 4, 1999) was an American physique photographer during the 1940s and 1950s. He produced erotic images of men under the alias "Lon of New York", or simply "Lon".

== Biography ==
=== Early years ===
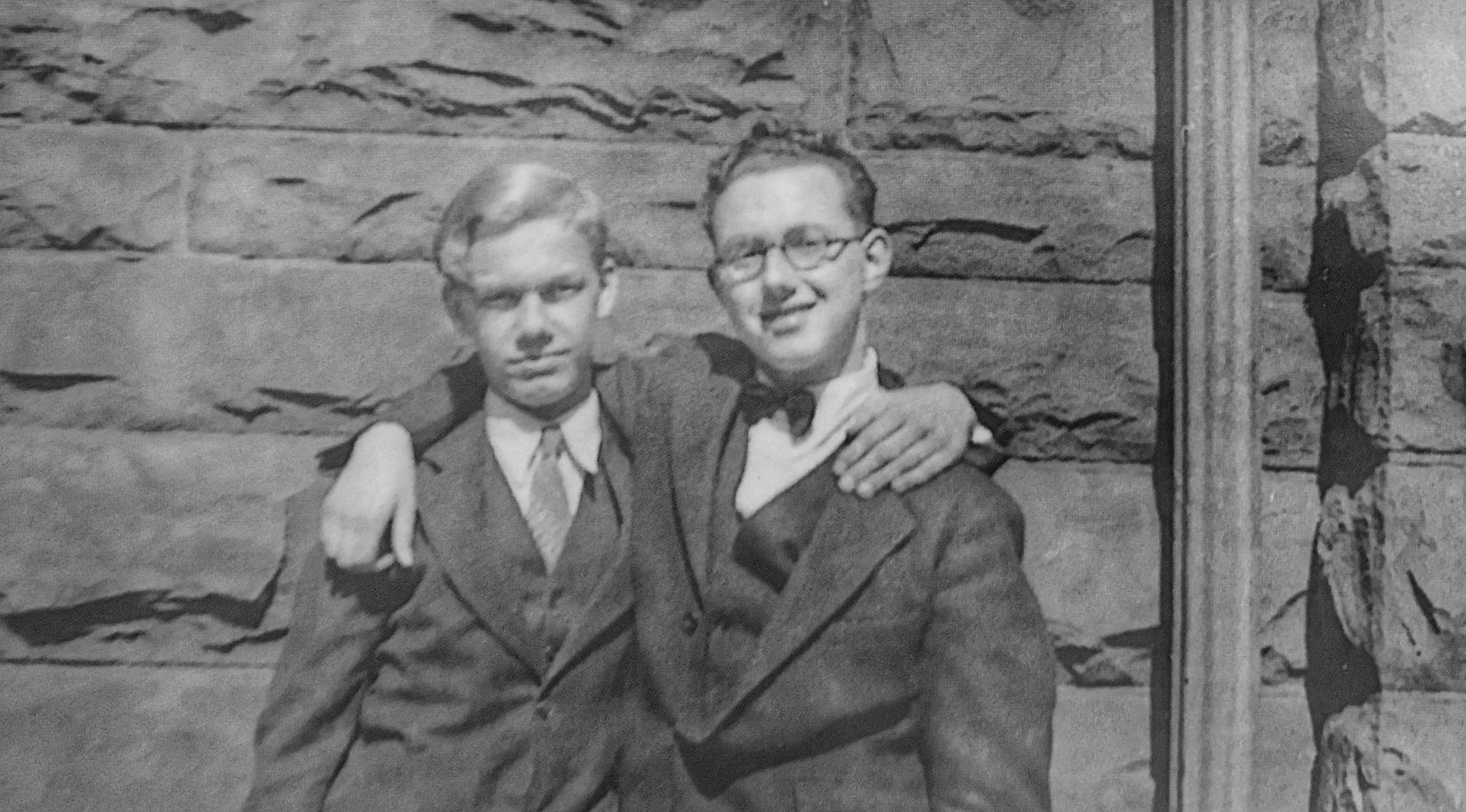
Teenager Lon (right) with his childhood friend Ralph Ehmke

Alonzo James "Lon" Hanagan was born in 1911 in Lexington, Massachusetts, the oldest child and only son of Frank and Lizzie Hanagan's three children. He had two younger sisters, Marry and Betty. The Hannagans were a religious family and although very close, it was a strict family environment. The family had a piano and Lon played on it, imitating an organist at the church, which the family attended every Sunday. He started to work as a teen boy, with his first job delivering fish from a local seller. In addition to playing music, he wrote and published some songs himself as a teenager. His first published composition was "A Bunch of Good Fellows Are We", written for a musical, performed by "Good Fellows" group. He started to play piano and organ on a weekly radio program in Lexington at the age of sixteen. He also performed in local churches and events. He moved with his family in 1928 to Lockport, New York, when his father was transferred to the Jefferson Union Plant. Lon graduated from high school in Lockport in 1929. In Lockport he worked as an organist at movie theaters. He befriended a local boy, Ralph Ehmke, who became his first boyfriend. Lon developed an interest in photography as a teenager, with his parents buying him a Kodak Box camera. He learned darkroom skills in a Boy Scout camp in New Hampshire. His early photographs were images of his family, friends, and endless snapshots of Ralph Ehmke. In camp he also made his first series of male nudes, photographing one of his adult camp counselors fresh from the shower.

=== New York City ===
Lon moved to New York City in 1936. He studied music at Juilliard School and for some time worked as an organist at Radio City Music Hall. He rented his first apartment at 617 West 113th Street. He also continued to write and publish music during those years.

=== Photography ===
The cover of a 1958 issue of Lon's physique magazine Male Model Parade, advertised as a "connoisseur album" of his photography

In New York City, Lon met a number of physique photographers, and in the late 1930s was taught the basics of physique photography by Robert Gebhart (who worked under the pseudonym "Gebbé"). In 1942, Lon released his first catalogue of physique photography, and had a series of photographs of bodybuilder John Grimek published in Strength & Health magazine. After the second world war, Lon devoted himself entirely to physique photography, abandoning his music career. He was known for using Greco-Roman esthetic in his photographic work. He mostly worked with Mediterranean, Latino and African American models, which was unusual in the 1940s, when most photographers preferred white models. His physique and beefcake photography was credited to his creative pseudonym, Lon of New York.

Though Lon was known for a camp demeanour in private, and sometimes photographed drag queens, his physique photography was serious rather than campy, featuring highly masculine models and poses.

Lon's photos were widely featured in popular physique magazines, and he published several magazines of his own: Men and Art, Male Pix, Star Models, and Male Model Parade.

His work is largely to be considered one of the pioneers of physique photography. He was a contemporary of, and many would argue also inspired, several other photographers in different regions of the country including Bruce Bellas (Bruce of Los Angeles), Bob Mizer (Athletic Model Guild or AMG) Douglas Juleff (Douglas of Detroit), Don Whitman of Western Photography Guild in Denver and, in Northern California, Russ Warner in Oakland and Dave Martin in San Francisco.

=== Late years ===
Hanagan's health declined in the early Nineties. He died in Lenox Hill Hospital in New York City on December 4, 1999, after a brief hospitalization. His body was cremated and ashes were scattered at his mother's grave in Lockport.

== Collections ==
Most Lon of New York works were considered too "dirty" to be included in public collections during his career. Robert Mapplethorpe had some of Lon's works in his personal archive. His work is also in the permanent collection of Leslie-Lohman Museum of Gay and Lesbian Art and in Harry Weintraub Collection Of Gay-Related Photography And Historical Documentation of Cornell University Library.

== Exhibitions ==
Despite Hanagan being inactive in photography in the latter part of his life, his photographs were distributed in exhibitions in the United States. Some of his images were exhibited as part of the group exhibition "Photoflexion" in Los Angeles Centre for Photographic studies in 1981, with images of Muybridge and Mapplethorpe. The exhibition attracted the attention of St. Martin's Press, which published its catalog as a book in 1984. Lon's work was also exhibited in several exhibitions in the Nineties, including "L'homme at Home: Male Nudes – 19th Century to Present" in Throckmorton Fine Art gallery in New York City; "Male", curated by Vince Aletti in Wessel+O'Connor Gallery; "Bonding" in David Allen Gallery in Venice, California.
