= TWO (magazine) =

Canadian gay magazine

- Cover of the third issue of TWO
- Categories: Physique magazine
- Format: digest
- Publisher: Gayboy Publishing
- First issue: July 1964
- Final issue: July–August 1966
- Country: Canada
- Based in: Toronto, Ontario
- OCLC: 65217138

TWO, subtitled The Homosexual Viewpoint in Canada, was a Toronto gay magazine published between 1964 and 1966. It combined physique photography with a variety of editorial content including articles, reviews of local gay nightlife, and fiction. TWO was one of Toronto's first gay magazines (preceded by Gay by just a few months), and was among the first magazines to combine the pictorial content of the physique genre with overtly gay editorial content.

The title is thought to be inspired by a supplement to the earlier homophile magazine ONE which used the same title as an initialism for "Truth Will Out".

== Publication history ==
TWO was published by Gayboy Publishing (later renamed Kamp Publishing Company). Its location was listed as 457 Church Street, then the site of a club called the Melody Room in Toronto's gay village. The magazine and club were both owned by Richard (Rick) Kerr, a Scottish-born entrepreneur. Kerr also owned two physique studios, R.A. (Rik Art) Studios and Can-art Photographers, which provided much of the magazine's physique content.

The first three issues were edited by Clifford Collier, under the pseudonym Claude Collier. The remaining eight were edited by Kerr, under the pseudonym Alex Edmond. The magazine's final issue was dated July–August 1966. The Melody Room went out of business in the same year.

The magazine was sold for 75 cents and mostly distributed through the Melody Room and the Music Room, another club owned by Kerr.

== Content ==
Approximately half of the magazine's pages were devoted to physique photographs of teen models. It increased its emphasis on physique photography following the departure of Collier as editor. It did not feature frontal nudity; where necessary, genitals were obscured with inked-in posing pouches. In addition to Kerr's R.A. and Can-art studios, the magazine featured photos from the studio of Frank Borck. It sometimes included inserts showcasing the photos of a particular studio.

Aside from physique photography, the magazine included a variety of editorial content including:

- book reviews
- coverage of local drag revues
- a gossip column, "Grapes from the Vine"
- a column on local affairs, "Very Much Out... and About"
- a serialized novel, Wrong Road to Happiness, written by Kerr under the pseudonym Edmond Kaye
