= John S. Barrington =

British physique photographer

John S. Barrington (1920–1991) was a British physique photographer and publisher. Barrington's photos of nude or semi-nude men appeared widely in British and American physique magazines, sometimes under the pseudonym John Paignton. Barrington published many of his own physique magazines, including Male Model Monthly, the first in Britain. He also published a number of books related to photography and anthropometry. Barrington was a prolific artist and publisher, and by 1984 was said to have published more nude titles than any other individual in Europe or the United States.

Barrington had frequent sexual encounters with men throughout his life, particularly with the men who modeled for him, though he identified as heterosexual.

== Career ==
Barrington began photographing men in 1938 at the men's bathing pond at Hampstead Heath. He studied at St Martin's School of Art and L'Ecole des Beaux Arts in Paris. In addition to photography, Barrington was also a visual artist and sculptor.

Barrington began working as a physique photographer in 1948. In 1954, he began publishing Male Model Monthly, the first physique magazine in Britain. From 1954 until 1979, he would go on to publish many more physique magazines in Britain and the US, among the best-known being MAN-ifique, FORMosus, Superb Youth, and Youth in the Sun.

Barrington was known to select models in the "boy next door" mold, with average body types. His photographs were mostly taken outdoors, with models appearing in relaxed, natural poses.

In the 1950s and 1960s Barrington published books on anatomy and anthropometry, ostensibly for the benefit of artists.

== Personal life and sexuality ==
From the beginning of his career, Barrington frequently picked up men for sex, and engaged in sexual relations with the men who modeled for him. Despite this, throughout his life Barrington rejected the notion that he was homosexual. According to his biographer, Barrington saw his same-sex relations as being purely for the pursuit of physical pleasure, and he sought to distance himself from the stereotypical figure of the "queen", which he reviled. He avoided men who self-identified as gay, and was most strongly attracted to the heterosexual men who rejected his advances.

In the 1950s, Barrington married the former girlfriend of one of his models. Barrington's continued sexual encounters with men were the source of some friction between him and his wife, but the two remained married until his death, and had children and grandchildren.

== Legal troubles ==
Barrington was subject to frequent legal troubles, mostly in relation to obscenity laws. In 1949, he was arrested for "harassing" two undercover police officers in a public bathroom and released with a fine.

In 1952, he was arrested for sending obscene materials through the mail. He was found guilty in 1955 and sentenced to three months in jail.

In 1963, Barrington was arrested under the recently enacted Obscene Publications Act. His case was publicized in the American physique magazine Manorama, published by Lynn Womack's Guild Press, which solicited funds for Barrington's defense, warning that "This case is not John Paignton's alone, it is the case of everyone of us."

== Later life and autobiography ==
After being diagnosed with leukaemia, Barrington came into contact with writer Rupert Smith and sought his help in writing his life story, and the two agreed to collaborate. Barrington died of leukaemia in 1991. The book, Physique: The Life of John S. Barrington, was completed by Smith and published in 1997 by Serpent's Tail.

== Publications ==
- The Romantic Male Nude
- Man-to-Man (editor)
- The Romantic Male Nude
- Art and Anatomy
- A Camera Life Class
- Anthropometry For Artists

== General references ==
- Johnson, David K. (2010). "Physique pioneers: The politics of 1960s gay consumer culture" (PDF). Journal of Social History. 43 (4): 867–892. doi:10.1353/jsh.0.0342. S2CID 143289271. Archived from the original (PDF) on 5 July 2022.
- Cooper, Emmanuel (2007) [1st pub. 1990]. Fully Exposed: The Male Nude in Photography (2nd ed.). Routledge. OCLC 1050065497.
- Deslandes, Paul R. (2013). "The cultural politics of gay pornography in 1970s Britain". In Lewis, Brian (ed.). British queer history. Manchester University Press. ISBN 978-07190-8895-7.
