= Russ Warner =

American photographer (1917–2004)

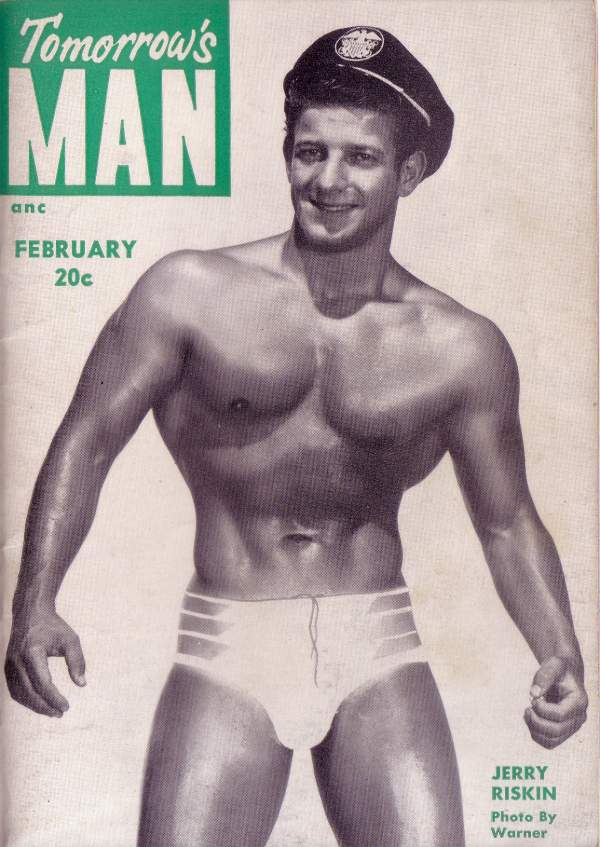
A 1954 cover photo of Tomorrow's Man taken by Warner.

Russ Warner (1917–2004) was an American physique photographer. His photographs of bodybuilders appeared widely in physique and bodybuilding magazines of the 1950s and 1960s. His photography studio was initially located in Oakland California; he later relocated to the Los Angeles area.

== Biography ==
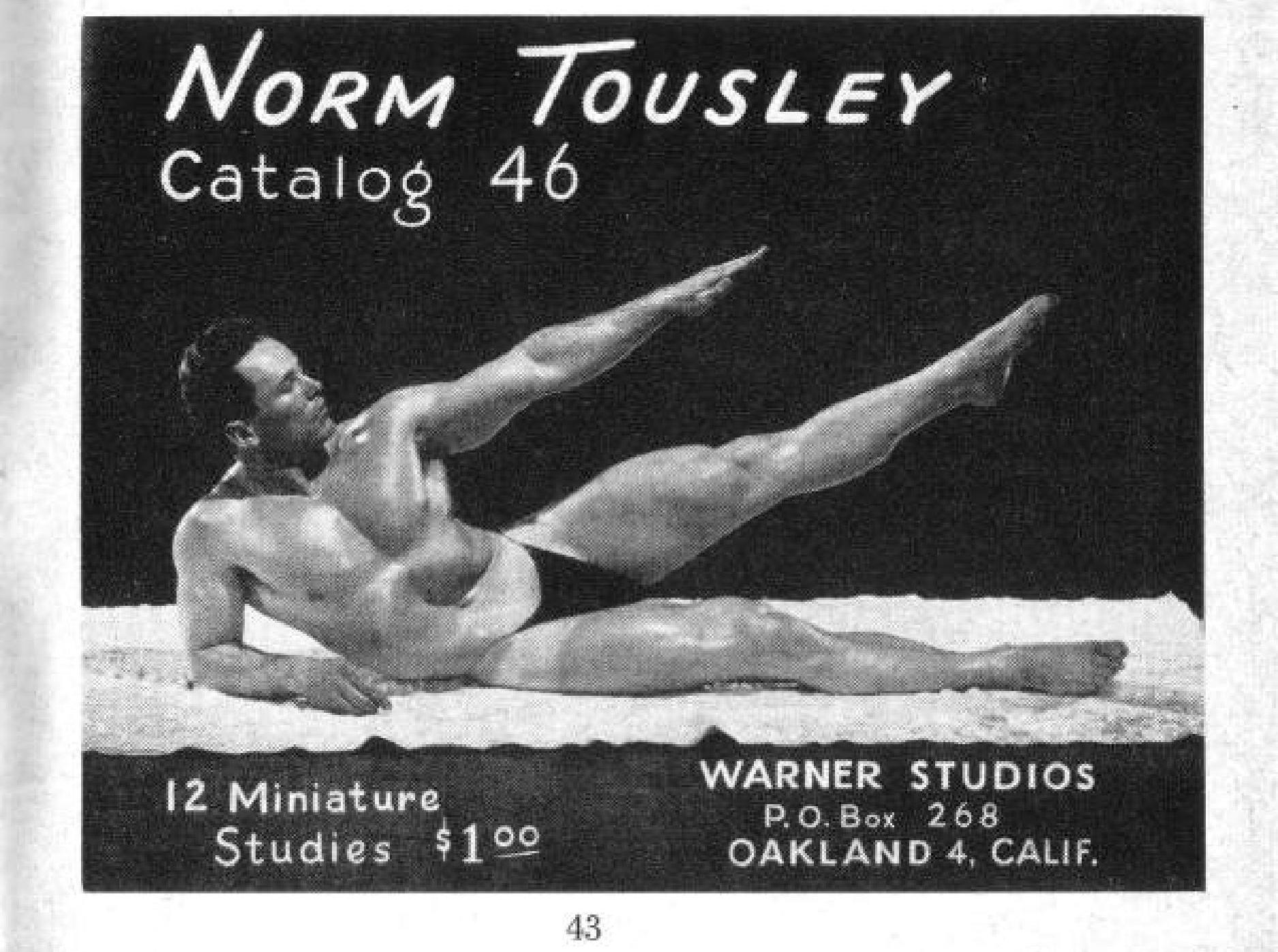
An advertisement for a catalogue of Warner's photos from a 1954 physique magazine. This is likely a nude photograph which has been edited to include a drawn posing strap, rendering it suitable for publication.

Warner was born Russell S. Warner in 1917. He died on 21 October 2004 in Escondido, California.

== Career ==
Originally a bodybuilder himself, Warner began photographing fellow bodybuilders after World War II. Unlike many other prominent physique photographers of the time, Warner was heterosexual, though he was aware that gay men comprised a significant portion of the audience for his photos.

=== Models ===
He photographed models in posing straps as well as in the nude. Warner's models included many bodybuilding titleholders and fitness experts. He famously photographed the duo of Junior Mr. America Jack Thomas and future television star Jack LaLanne in the nude. (Note: Sources give the date of this photo set as either 1954 or the late 1940s.) LaLanne later attempted to buy and destroy all prints of the photo set, apparently out of concern for their homosexual connotation.

In 1955, Warner's studio was raided. As a result, Norm Tousley, a man who had modelled for Warner in a posing strap, was fired from his position as a lieutenant of the Oakland Fire Department. Investigators and prosecutors typically targeted physique photographers, publishers, and consumers; scholar Thomas Waugh characterizes this incident as "the most prominent case involving victimization of a model".

=== Innovations ===
Warner was known as the inventor in 1954 of an indoor lighting technique known as "rim lighting", in which he used floodlights to light a model against a black backdrop to highlight the details of their body.

=== Mail order sales ===
At some point before 1951, Warner was interviewed in Washington by postal inspectors regarding his distribution of nude photographs with "inked-in" posing straps (a common practice at the time, which allowed customers to easily remove the doctored pouch to reveal the full photo). He sold nude photographs by mail order up to the late 1950s.

=== Magazines ===
Warner's studio was one of six featured in the debut issue of Physique Pictorial (then titled Physique Photo News) in 1951, the first of the gay-oriented physique magazines which would achieve wide popularity through the 1950s and early-to-mid 1960s.

Warner, along with Bob Delmonteque, George Quaintance, Anthony Guyther (a.k.a. Vulcan Studios), and the studio Christopher, calling themselves the "Big Five" of the physique business, founded the physique magazine Fizeek. They published only a single issue, in 1957, before the title was later relaunched in 1959 by H. Lynn Womack.

During the early 1960s, Warner worked for Joe Weider, providing photographs for his organization's wide catalogue of magazines, which included gay-oriented posing strap titles like Tomorrow's Man and Vim, as well as titles which were seriously devoted to bodybuilding and physique culture, such as Muscle Builder and Mr. America.

Warner continued taking photographs for bodybuilding magazines for several decades thereafter.

== Bibliography ==
- Johnson, David K. (2019). Buying Gay: How Physique Entrepreneurs Sparked a Movement (eBook ed.). New York: Columbia University Press. ISBN 978-0-231-54817-5.
- Krauss, Kenneth (2015). Male Beauty: Postwar Masculinity in Theater, Film, and Physique magazines. SUNY Press. ISBN 978-1-4384-5000-1. OCLC 906090551.
- Waugh, Thomas (1996). Hard to Imagine: Gay Male Eroticism in Photography and Film from Their Beginnings to Stonewall. Columbia University Press. ISBN 0-231-09998-3.
