= Ah Men =

Clothing store that catered to gay men

Coordinates: 34.08441°N 118.38508°W

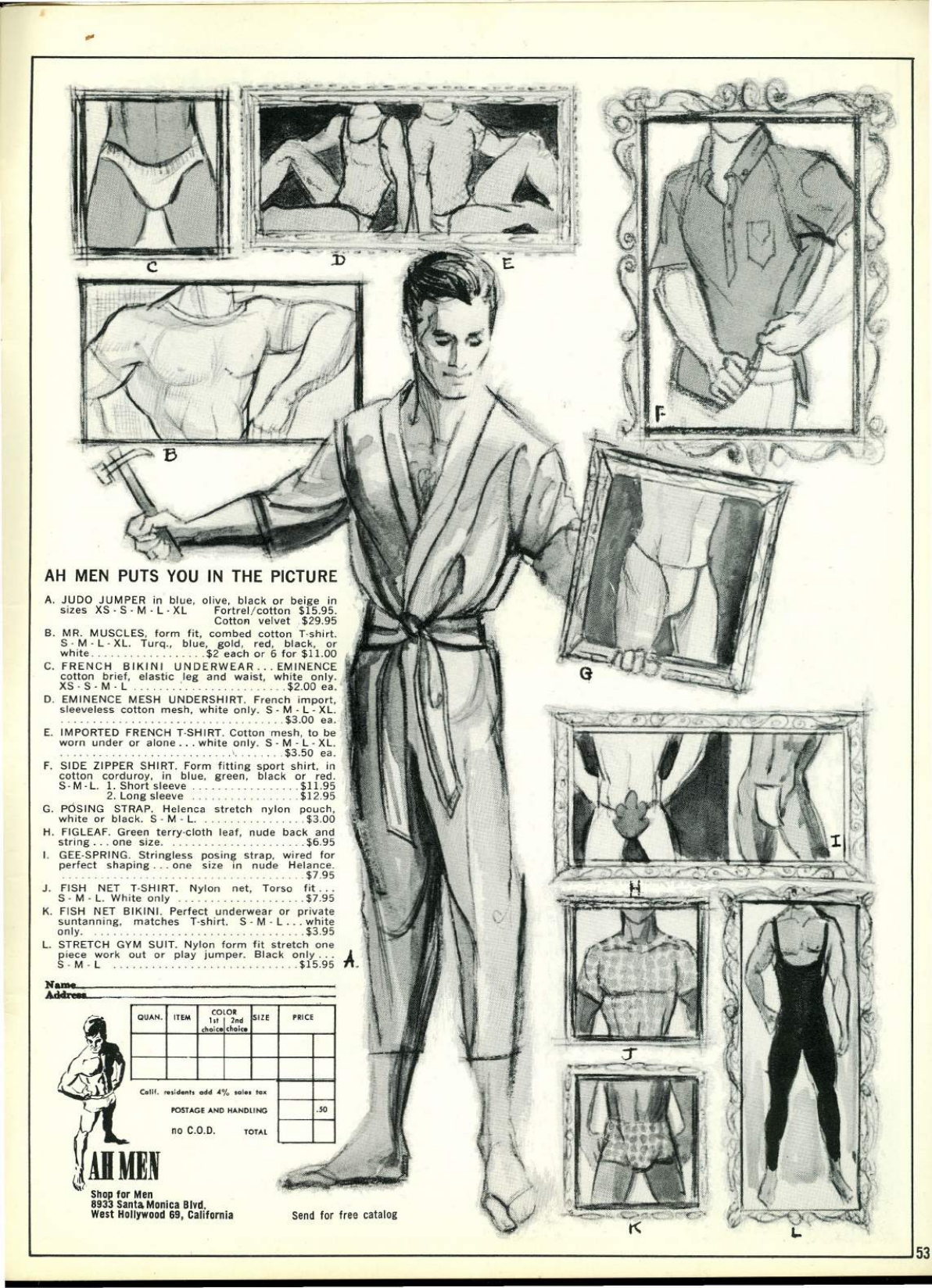
A full-page Ah Men advertisement in a 1964 issue of physique magazine Go Guys, including multiple models of "posing straps", revealing thong-style undergarments associated with physique photography.

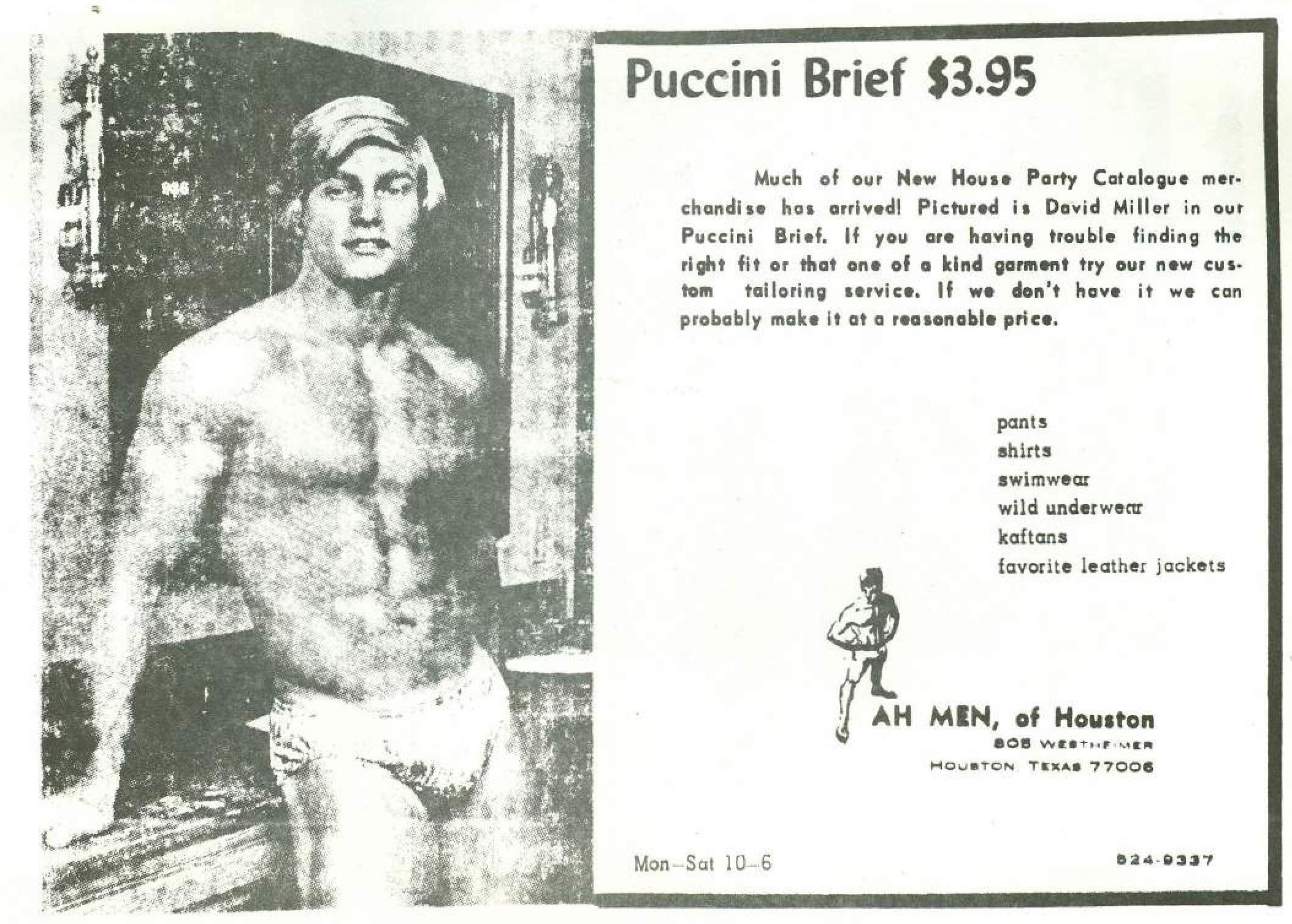
An advertisement for briefs included in the program for the 1975 Miss Gay America pageant. The Houston Ah Men location sponsored the event and staged a "male fashion show" as part of the ceremony.

Ah Men was a clothing store in West Hollywood which catered to a gay male clientele. It was founded in the late 1950s or early 1960s (Note: David K. Johnson gives the founding date as 1962, but other sources give a date of 1958, or the "late 1950s".) by Jerry Furlow and Don Cook. It specialized in flamboyant styles, including garments made from see-through mesh, form-fitting swimwear, "erotic" underwear, and flowing caftans. It has been called the first gay retail business in West Hollywood, an area which would eventually come to be known as one of the most prominent gay villages in the United States. Ah Men also operated one of the first gay mail order businesses, which it advertised in physique magazines and other gay-interest publications. Between its retail business, mail-order operations, and manufacturing, Ah Men employed more than fifty people. Its success paved the way for other gay-oriented clothing boutiques in the area such as All American Boy, as well as the similar mail-order business International Male, which debuted in the mid-70s.

It was originally located at 8933 Santa Monica Boulevard. In 1972, it relocated to the corner of Santa Monica Boulevard and San Vicente Boulevard, which is now the site of a bank. In the same year, two other locations were opened, one in Silver Lake, Los Angeles and the other in Houston, Texas.
