= Gay (magazine) =

Canadian magazine

- Categories: Gay magazine
- Format: Tabloid
- First issue: March 30, 1964
- Final issue: 1966
- Company: The Gay Publishing Company
- Country: Canada
- Based in: Toronto, Ontario
- Language: English

Gay was Toronto's first gay magazine, published almost simultaneously with ASK Newsletter, together among Canada's first gay magazines. The magazine was first printed on 30 March 1964. The earliest periodical anywhere to use "Gay" in its title. Produced by four Toronto men in a commercial venture, the Gay Publishing Company, Gay ran "serious" articles, letters to the editor, a diary, gossip columns, a feature called the "Gabrial Club", poetry, fiction, politics and a discreet personal column. Gay was illustrated, usually with photographs of drag queens, but also including physique photography.

Intended for a "mainstream" gay audience, it reflected cautious reformism, defending the rights and normalcy of a constituency living in a hostile environment. This was not unlike the political activism emerging in a few large American and European cities before more confrontational activism. Gay also published articles on Toronto police raids on bars, and on the calls for social and political change that were beginning to surface.

The first 500-copy issue sold out almost immediately. With a print-run of 2000 copies by issue three, the magazine was distributed to a number of outlets in Toronto and Montreal. Shortly afterwards, Gay expanded into the United States as Gay International. It quickly outstripped American publications' distribution, and by the spring of 1965 it was distributing 20,000 copies across North America and selling about 8000. Publication ended in 1966 when criminal charges were levied against one of its central creators.
