= Rupert Smith (novelist) =

English novelist (born 1960)

Rupert Smith (born 1960) is an American-born English author and journalist.

Smith has written novels and biographies under his birth name, and is also known for his gay erotica genre novels. These novels are published under the pen name James Lear. A third name, Rupert James, is used for books aimed at a female audience. To date, these three pen names, which respectively cover mainstream, erotic, and women's fiction, neatly categorise and encompass all of his literary output.

Under his birth name, Smith has written novels inspired by his more than twenty years experience in entertainment journalism. These comprise his first three novels, I Must Confess, Fly on the Wall, and Service Wash, the latter inspired by the author's time working with a soap opera, EastEnders, on its 20th-anniversary book. His fourth novel, Man's World, was about two gay men living fifty years apart in London, where each explores the "scene" of his time. In 2013 he wrote Grim, a horror novel, and the following year a female-led coming-of-age story, Interlude. The author's first book, Man Enough to be a Woman was a collaborative memoir of the singer/performer/artist Jayne County. Physique was a collaborative memoir of the gay photographer John S. Barrington.

The Lear novels include Bildungsromans, such as The Palace of Varieties (about a man's introduction to the secret gay scene of 1930s London), and Golden Age detective stories, viz: his Mitch Mitchell series, about an American at Oxford University. These books are often praised for their historical detail. The Lear name is also attached to a contemporary hardboiled series about Dan Stagg, a victim of America's now-defunct Don't Ask, Don't Tell policy. Lear novels feature handsome, muscular, and happily promiscuous young men. Each story has frequent, graphic gay sex. Their titles tend to be homoerotic puns, like A Sticky End and The Hardest Thing.

== Bibliography ==
=== As Rupert Smith ===
Biographies

- Jayne County: Man Enough to Be a Woman (1996, second edition 2021)
- Physique: The Life of John S. Barrington (1997) - written collaboratively with Barrington

Novels

- I Must Confess (1998)
- Fly on the Wall (2002)
- Service Wash (2003)
- Man's World (2010)
- Grim (2013)
- Interlude (2014)

=== As James Lear ===
- Hot Valley (2007)
- The Palace of Varieties (2008)
- The Low Road (2009)

Mitch Mitchell series

- The Back Passage (2006)
- The Secret Tunnel (2008)
- A Sticky End (2010)
- The Sun Goes Down (2016)

Dan Stagg series

- The Hardest Thing (2013)
- Straight Up (2015)
- In the Ring (2018)

=== As Rupert James ===
- Stepsisters (2010)
- Silk (2010)
