= Physique magazine =

Magazine genre

A 1953 issue of Tomorrow's Man, an early physique magazine ostensibly dedicated to health and bodybuilding

Physique magazines or beefcake magazines were magazines devoted to physique photography—that is, photographs of muscular "beefcake" men—typically young and attractive—in athletic poses, usually in revealing, minimal clothing. During their heyday in North America in the 1950s to 1960s, they were presented as magazines dedicated to fitness, health, and bodybuilding, with the models often shown demonstrating exercises or the results of their regimens, or as artistic reference material. However, their unstated primary purpose was erotic imagery, primarily created by and for gay men at a time when homosexuality was the subject of cultural taboos and government censorship.

Physique magazines were sold by newspaper stands, bookstores, and pharmacies. They were available in cities and even towns across the United States and by subscription, and popular titles such as Physique Pictorial served as an early nationwide cultural nexus for bisexual and gay men. Scholar Thomas Waugh described physique magazines as the "richest documentation of gay culture of the period".

The genre was popular from approximately the early 1950s until the mid 1960s. With the legalization and increased availability of gay pornographic magazines and videos in the late 1960s and 1970s, most physique magazines either evolved to include more explicit material or went out of business.

== Background ==
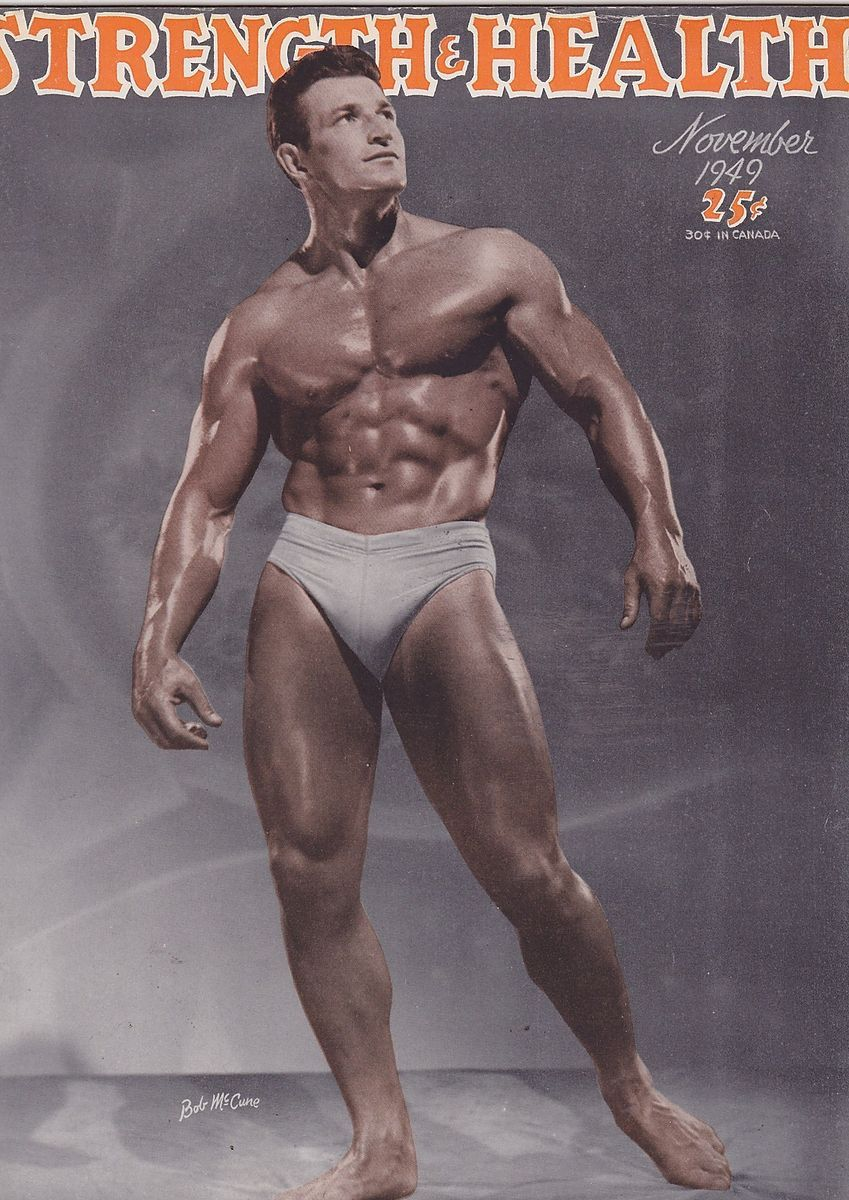
Early gay physique photographers advertised their work in "legitimate" bodybuilding publications such as Strength & Health before the inception of physique magazines designed for gay men.

The early 20th century brought an increased interest in weightlifting and bodybuilding, led by figures such as strongman Eugen Sandow. An early driver of this change was the physical culture movement, a social movement spanning Europe and North America which emphasized the development of the body via exercise and weightlifting. Magazines devoted to physical culture began to appear in the 1890s, starting in Germany. The first such English publications were Eugen Sandow's Sandow's Magazine of Physical Culture (Physical Culture during its first year of publication) and Bernarr Macfadden's Physical Development, both appearing in 1898.

At the same time, depictions of the bodies of muscular athletes and weightlifters, including stars such as Sandow and George Hackenschmidt, became increasingly common in the popular press and as fodder for postcards (which experienced a boom between 1900 and 1920).

Thomas Waugh also identifies the late-19th century German Freikörperkultur (literally "free body culture") movement, a nudist social reform movement, as influencing the subsequent development of physique magazines in Germany and beyond.

By the 1920s, demand for photos of musclemen was sufficient to support photographers who dedicated themselves entirely to physique photography, such as John Hernic. Waugh dates the first appearance of a "systematic crypto-gay subculture" working behind the scenes of the bodybuilding sphere to the 1930s. Gay physique photographers working during this era included Edwin F. Townsend, Earle Forbes, Robert Gebhart, Al Urban, Lon Hanagan, Lou Melan, Barton Horvath, and Dick Falcon (all but the last operating in New York City). During this period, many of these photographers shot primarily in the nude; if it was necessary to obscure genitalia for publication, they would do so after the fact by modifying the negatives or prints.

A new generation of bodybuilding magazines began to appear in the 1930s, most notably Bob Hoffman's Strength & Health in 1932, and various publications from the Montreal-based Weider brothers, Joe and Ben, such as Muscle & Fitness. Gay photographers such as Al Urban and Bob Mizer used the back pages of Strength and Health, which, by the time of World War II, was the leading fitness magazine, to advertise "undraped" (i.e. nude) photographs for sale. Further evidence for gay readership has been seen in pen-pal letters printed in the magazine's "Leaguers" column, which seem to carry a gay subtext.

Another early nexus for gay men's involvement in the physique world were bodybuilding competitions. The first of the modern bodybuilding competitions, Mr. America, began in 1939. According to Bob Mizer, it was an "open secret" that gay men comprised a large portion of the audience for these competitions, in which men would display their muscled bodies on stage in skimpy costumes. Gay men also became involved behind-the-scenes in the bodybuilding community, organizing competitions, and working as event photographers.

When the new generation of physique magazines targeted at gay men began to appear in the 1950s, they faced opposition from traditional bodybuilding publications. Strength & Health ran an editorial warning of "trashy magazines" which contributed to juvenile delinquency, and Iron Man magazine called for a cleanup of the "homosexual element" which had "infiltrated" bodybuilding magazines and events.

== Content ==
The characteristic uniting all physique magazines was a focus on physique photography—homoerotic photographs of nearly (or sometimes entirely) nude, attractive young men. Many physique magazines also included reproductions of homoerotic artwork, and editorial content, such as exercise tips or book reviews.

=== Photographs ===
A page from a 1955 issue of Physique Pictorial. Models would generally wear a "posing strap" or other skimpy attire to skirt obscenity laws.

Physique photographs typically depicted young men in posing straps (a thong-style undergarment with a pouch for the genitalia) or another minimal covering such as swim briefs, short shorts, or a towel or piece of cloth. Full-frontal nudity was generally not depicted until the late 1960s when obscenity enforcement was loosened and physique magazines began to give way to overt pornography. Beginning in the early 1960s, some magazines began to push the envelope with outlines of genitalia becoming increasingly visible through posing straps.

The first appearance of frontal male nudity on American newsstands were imported European publications which bore the alibi of promoting the nudist lifestyle, which began to appear as early as 1965. The first American magazines to feature frontal nudity were Drum and the San Francisco-based Butch, both in 1966, though these led to legal challenges.

Photographs were sourced from a variety of photographers and studios, such as Bob Mizer's Athletic Model Guild. Some magazines included amateur photography sent in by readers.

A cartoon in a 1959 issue of physique magazine Gym poked fun at the trend of physique magazines moving toward young, slim, models and flamboyant presentation, compared to the rigid poses and bulky bodies displayed in "old school" publications.

Compared to mainstream fitness and bodybuilding magazines, which focused on highly muscular physiques, physique magazines included models with a wider variety of body types, including men with more lean, "natural" builds. Models were mostly white men, a fact which has been attributed to weak demand for photos of racially diverse men among consumers of the magazines.

Models were typically young adult men in their late teens or twenties, but underage models were occasionally featured openly. For example, in 1955, Physique Pictorial used a 16-year-old cover model for its summer issue, and ran a 2-page spread of a 14-year-old model in its spring issue.

Captions typically featured the name, age, and measurements of the model, along with varying amounts of biographical detail. However, these details were often fabricated to appeal to readers' appetites, and most studios allowed models to use pseudonyms.

Centerfold spreads began to appear in physique magazines shortly after being popularized in corresponding heterosexual ("cheesecake") publications such as Playboy.

=== Artwork ===
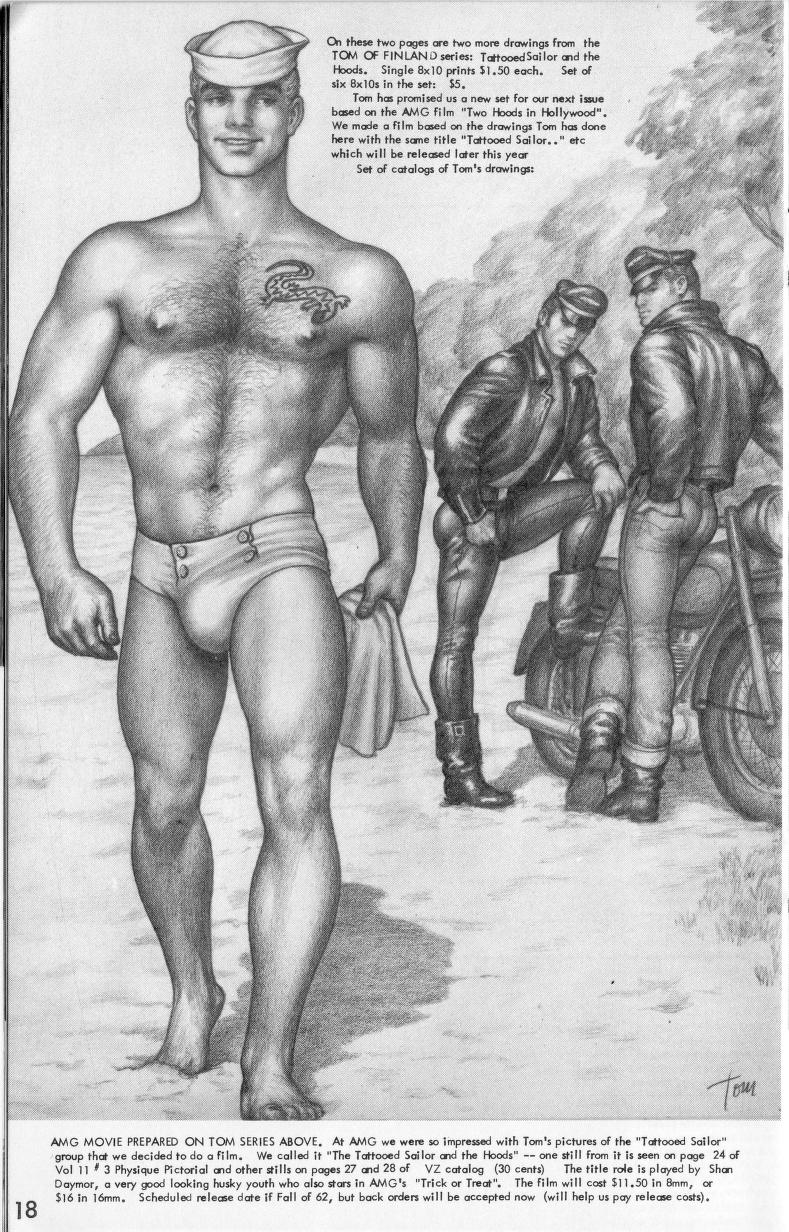
A Tom of Finland drawing from a 1962 issue of Physique Pictorial. Sailors and leather-clad motorcyclists were common subjects of Tom of Finland's drawings.

Physique magazines often featured reproductions of homoerotic paintings and drawings by gay artists such as George Quaintance and Etienne. Famed gay artist Tom of Finland came to notice in America after submitting his drawings to Physique Pictorial in 1956, and it was editor Bob Mizer who coined the credit Tom of Finland for the artist (whose real name was Touko Laaksonen).

A sub-genre of physique magazines devoted themselves entirely to physique art, such as Fizeek Art Quarterly. These magazines experienced a boom around 1963–1964.

=== Commercial content ===
Many physique magazines doubled as a sort of mail order catalogue. Physique Pictorial began as a venue for selling Athletic Model Guild photo sets by mail, as had previously been done through the back pages of Strength & Health. Though editors were careful to deny it, the photos sold by mail were often more explicit than those featured in the magazine, including frontal nudity or posing straps which were merely "inked on" and could be rubbed away by the consumer.

Later, magazines expanded their offerings to include other items such as slides, calendars, and posing straps.

=== Connection to homosexuality ===
Though largely created by and for gay men, physique magazines initially avoided overt references to homosexuality, using a number of pretenses to explain their content. Magazines became more relaxed in their adherence to these pretenses over time, occasionally incorporating coy sexual allusions into editorial and photographic content.

==== Alibis ====
Thomas Waugh identifies three main "alibis" which physique magazines used to mask their true purpose and audience. Some, such as Tomorrow's Man, relied on the pretense of promoting health and fitness, including short articles on diet and weightlifting, reporting on bodybuilding competitions, and commentary on models' muscular development. Others claimed to be providing reference photographs for artists. For example, a 1954 issue of Physique Pictorial claimed that the magazine was "planned primarily as an art reference book and is widely used in colleges and private schools throughout the country." A third alibi, mostly limited to European publications, was a claimed affiliation with the nudist movement.

Waugh considers it likely that the true nature of physique magazines was an "open secret", with these alibis existing mostly as a polite fiction. An example of contemporary skepticism is a 1959 exposé in Sports Illustrated, which noted:

...and all the magazines, they keep saying, operate under principles that are almost embarrassingly respectable. When accused, as some of them have been, of catering only to homosexuals, they act shocked; editorially they protest that they are eminently "cultural," devoted to "esthetic appreciation of the male physique," no naughtier than The Atlantic Monthly...

Adherence to these alibis became more relaxed over time. By the 1960s, most magazines had moved away from the rigid poses associated with bodybuilding and toward more relaxed poses and naturalistic settings such as the bachelor pad.

==== References to homosexuality ====
A subtle early signal to gay audiences was physique magazines' use of classical Greco-Roman imagery and language. This connection was embodied in the names of several publications, including Grecian Guild Pictorial, Apollo, Vulcan, and Young Adonis, as well as the frequent use of Grecian columns and props in photographs, which also served to justify the amount of nudity depicted.

Even covert textual references to homosexuality were rare in the early years of physique magazines. One early example cited by Kenneth Krauss is a 1956 announcement of the marriage of famed physique model Glenn Bishop in Body Beautiful, which joked that "The Broken Hearts chapter of the GLENN BISHOP FAN CLUB will sponsor a mass drowning at Fire Island"—many gay men in the 1950s would have understood this as an inside joke, given the status of Fire Island as a gay hotspot.

As time went on, some magazines became more daring in their willingness to discuss homosexuality directly. The July 1959 issue of VIM included an article titled "Males, Morals & Mores" which offered a measured defense of homosexuality as merely "different", and quoted Alfred Kinsey's study of male sexuality. The article warned that homosexuals and readers of physique magazines were being unfairly scapegoated as causes of juvenile delinquency.

Drum, published by Clark Polak from 1964 was an example of a hybrid format combining physique photography with editorial content devoted to the homophile movement. The circulation of overtly gay magazines increased tenfold between 1965 and 1969. The increased acceptability of such publications contributed to the extinction of the physique magazine.

== Format ==
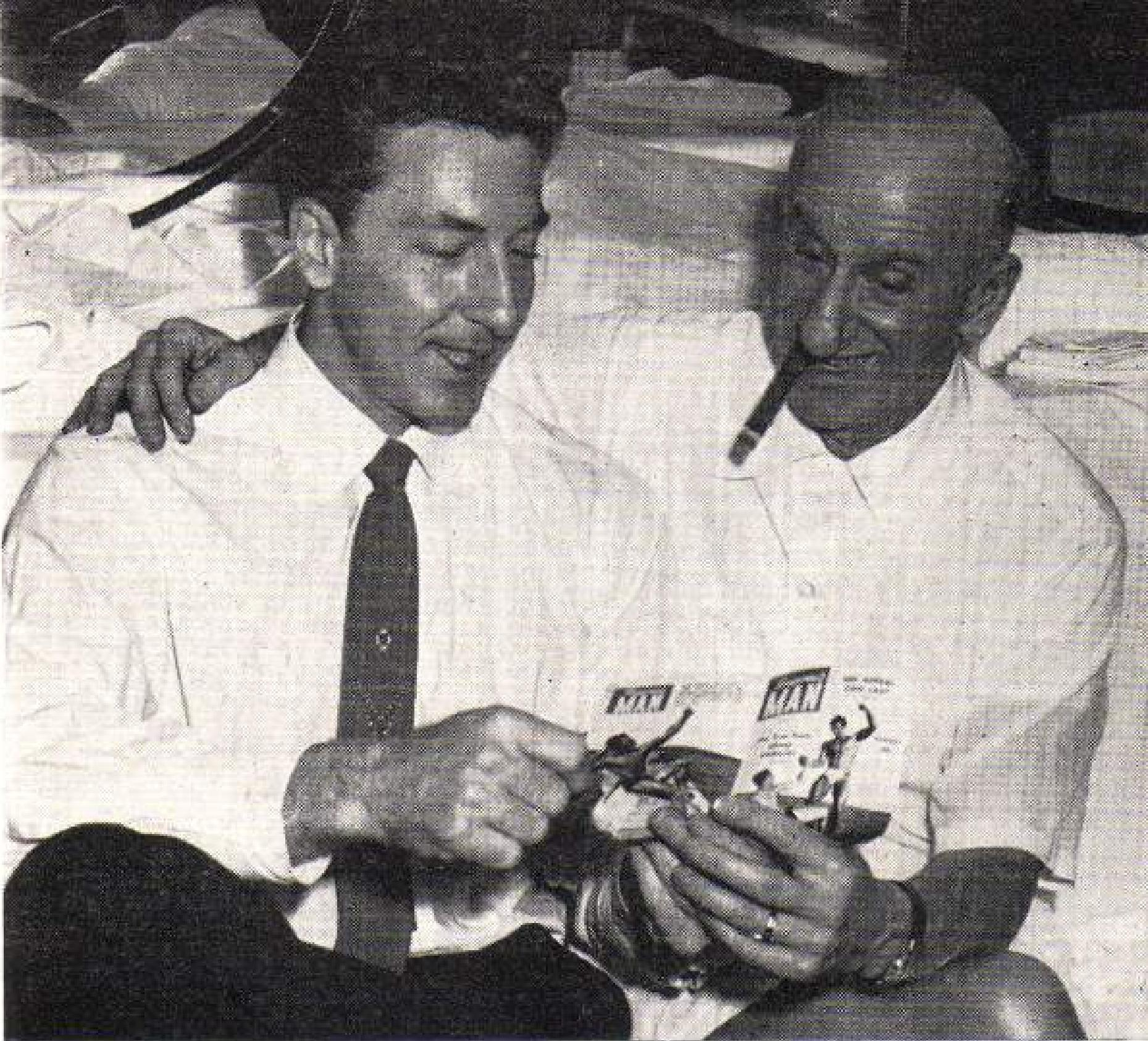
Most physique magazines were printed in a small digest format, including Tomorrow's Man, shown here in the hands of founder Irv Johnson and comedian Jimmy Durante.

Early physique magazines were digest size. Eventually large-format titles would appear, some with full color. Among the earliest were the Joe Weider magazines Young Physique and Demi-Gods, debuting in 1958 and 1961, respectively.

== Circulation and scale ==
At their height of popularity, physique magazines were a major industry. It has been estimated that their circulation exceeded the serious political magazines dedicated to the homophile movement (what would now be called the gay rights movement) such as ONE magazine and the Mattachine Review, by a factor of ten, or even one hundred. One factor affecting this discrepancy was that homophile publications faced greater barriers to being carried by newsstands. In 1964, a large newsstand in Dayton, Ohio, was found to be selling about twenty different physique magazines, each of which would likely have sold around twenty to forty thousand copies per issue. One publisher estimated a total annual circulation, across all physique magazines, of nine million in the United States.

The United States led the world in physique photography, and American physique magazines were consumed internationally, but other countries also developed their own local titles. Despite publishers co-operating and photographs being shared internationally, European physique magazines and photographers outside the United States are a neglected field. For instance: Male Model Monthly, Man's World, Male Classics and Model Man in the UK, several with dual US/UK cover prices; Muscle Builder in Australia; Sciences culturistes, La culture physique, and Apollon-Venus in France. Several Canadian titles had wide international circulation, including those of Joe Weider and of photographer Alan B. Stone (operating under the name "Mark-One Studio"). In Denmark Amigo and in Sweden Vikings.

== Notable publishers ==
Physique photographer Lon of New York published his own magazine, Male Model Parade, which was essentially a catalogue for his studio.

Bob Mizer's Physique Pictorial, founded in 1951, is widely regarded as the first in the tradition of physique magazines targeted to a gay audience, and also the first magazine of any kind in the US to target gay men. Mizer's photography, distributed via his Athletic Model Guild, also appeared in other magazines, including overseas.

Canadian bodybuilder and entrepreneur Joe Weider published the bodybuilding magazine Your Physique starting in 1940, but later branched out into publishing several physique magazines in the 1950s and 60s, including Adonis, Body Beautiful, and The Young Physique. Unlike other prominent publishers, Weider was heterosexual. He employed Hal Warner, a gay man, to edit several of his physique publications. Weider would go on to found several major American fitness magazines in the 1980s, including Men's Fitness.

Lynn Womack, founder of Guild Press, created a number of original physique magazines, and acquired several other existing publications including Grecian Guild Pictorial, Vim, and MANual. He fought the landmark Supreme Court obscenity case Manual Enterprises, Inc. v. Day.

The studios which provided photographs for physique magazines received little in the way of direct compensation from publishers; instead, the magazines served to advertise their mail order sales of photographs directly to readers. Many of the most prominent physique studios, such as those of Bruce Bellas and Lon of New York, started their own magazines, which essentially served as advertising catalogues.

== Legal challenges ==
Both producers and consumers of physique magazines in the US faced frequent legal challenges, particularly from the US Post Office, which, at the time, took an active role in preventing the circulation through the mail of what it deemed obscene materials, under the Comstock laws of 1873. The determination of obscenity in the United States originally followed the Hicklin test, which applied to any material which had the tendency to "deprave and corrupt those whose minds are open to such immoral influences" (typically taken to be children). The Hicklin test was replaced following the Supreme Court case Roth v. United States, which established a narrower standard of being "utterly without redeeming social value".

According to David K. Johnson, "almost all" photographers and publishers associated with the physique magazine industry faced arrest and trial at some point, with many, including Bob Mizer, Lynn Womack, and John Barrington, being jailed as a result. In the 1940s, before the first physique magazines, physique photographers like Bob Mizer and Al Urban were the subject of investigations by postal inspectors for distributing their photos through the mail. A pattern which continued through the era of the physique magazine was that the photographer or publisher would usually ultimately succeed at trial (sometimes after one or more appeals), but bore a significant financial burden in fighting the case.

In addition to producers, consumers of physique magazines were also sometimes subject to prosecution. Among the best known examples was a 1959 case in Massachusetts involving seven "physique enthusiasts" found to be in the possession of "obscene photographs and literature" which included physique magazines like Grecian Guild Pictorial, MANual, and Gym. As a result of the scandal, one of the seven, Newton Arvin, an esteemed professor of literature at Smith College, was forced out of his teaching position and subsequently hospitalized for suicidal depression.

== List of magazines ==
According to Thomas Waugh, there were "well over one hundred" pre-Stonewall physique magazines in the English-speaking world, and many more non-English publications originating from northern Europe. However, many of these were of a "fly-by-night" character, and are therefore poorly documented.

List of physique magazines
Title	Year of first issue	Notes	OCLC
Vigour	1944/1946? (Note: Different sources give the date of first issue as either 1944 or 1946)	A British magazine published up to 1955. Initially a serious physical culture magazine, but by 1947, its focus had shifted toward physique photography, with a mix of photos from British and American studios. Resurrected in 2013 as a general fitness, health, nutrition, and adventure publication.	884498598
Physique Pictorial	1951	Widely considered to be the first physique magazine. Remained in publication until 1990, but switched to fully nude photographs starting in 1969.	643902464
Tomorrow's Man	1952	Published in Chicago by Irvin Johnson.	18535079
Adonis	1954	Produced by Montreal-based Weider Organization, and published in two simultaneous editions from London and Jersey City. Edited by Hal Warner.	1024014323
Body Beautiful	1954	Produced by Montreal-based Weider Organization, and published in two simultaneous editions from London and Jersey City. Edited by Hal Warner.	224987899
Male Model Monthly	1954	Has been described as the first British physique magazine. Created by physique photographer John S. Barrington, it featured models with Greek and Roman statuary. Barrington would go on to publish many more homoerotic magazines up until 1979, including MAN-ifique, FORMosus, Superb Youth, and Youth in the Sun.	473823208
Men and Art	1954		32777971
Star Models	1954		37662994
Vim	1954 (Note: Thomas Waugh states that Vim was launched in February 1940 in Columbus, Ohio. This is likely a conflation with the earlier (apparently unrelated) short-lived physical culture magazine, Vim: The Vital Magazine, published by Roger Eels between 1940 and 1941.)	Known for its camp sensibilities. Originally edited by William E. Bunton, then, from 1959, by Jack Zuideveld (using the pseudonym Jack Walters). Relaunched by Lynn Womack in 1963 with more explicitly gay, sexual content.	38404562
Grecian Guild Pictorial	1955		18564261
TRIM	1956	Said to have a circulation of more than 30,000 within a year of its debut.	18583918
Fizeek	1957	Founded by five physique photographers and artists, including George Quaintance and Anthony Guyther. A single issue was published before the magazine was relaunched by Lynn Womack.	18583963
The Young Physique	1958	Large-format color magazine founded by Joe Weider, featured drawings by George Quaintance, and creative sets designed by the gay photographer James Bidgood.	504117461
MANual	1959	First published as The New MANual: The Bodybuilder's Manual in April 1959, and renamed in August 1959. Originally a physique art catalog published by SirPrise in Chicago, later acquired by Lynn Womack.	38219987
Demi-Gods	1961	A large-format glossy magazine, published and edited by Joe Weider. Incorporated into Muscleboy in 1963, but reappeared as a separate publication some years later.	229986472
Manorama	1961	A Lynn Womack publication edited by Bob Anthony, featuring photos and illustrations but no editorial content.	18574986
Young Adonis	1963	A large-format colour magazine published by Bob Mizer's AMG. Only one issue was ever published.	38421813
Drum	1964	An overtly gay publication containing a mix of articles covering the homophile movement and physique photography. Edited by Clark Polak.	3163560
TWO	1964	Overtly gay Toronto publication bearing the subtitle "The Homosexual Viewpoint in Canada". Around half the magazine was devoted to teen physique photography, with the remainder being a mix of articles, stories, and local event listings. Featured the work of photographer Frank Borck.	65217138

== Legacy ==
Scholar David K. Johnson identifies the years from 1951 (the debut of Physique Pictorial) to 1967 as the "physique era". Thomas Waugh describes the magazines as peaking between 1955 and 1965. Physique magazines had largely disappeared by the end of the 1960s, as new legal precedent allowed full-frontal nudity and frank discussion of homosexuality. Some titles transitioned to more explicit content in order to remain viable. Physique Pictorial transitioned from physique photos to full nudes in 1969, and remained in print until 1990.

== See also ==
- Physique photography
- List of gay pornographic magazines
- Bara, genre of Japanese art and media
- Beefcake, 1999 docudrama
- Gay pulp fiction
