= Physique photography =

Photography type

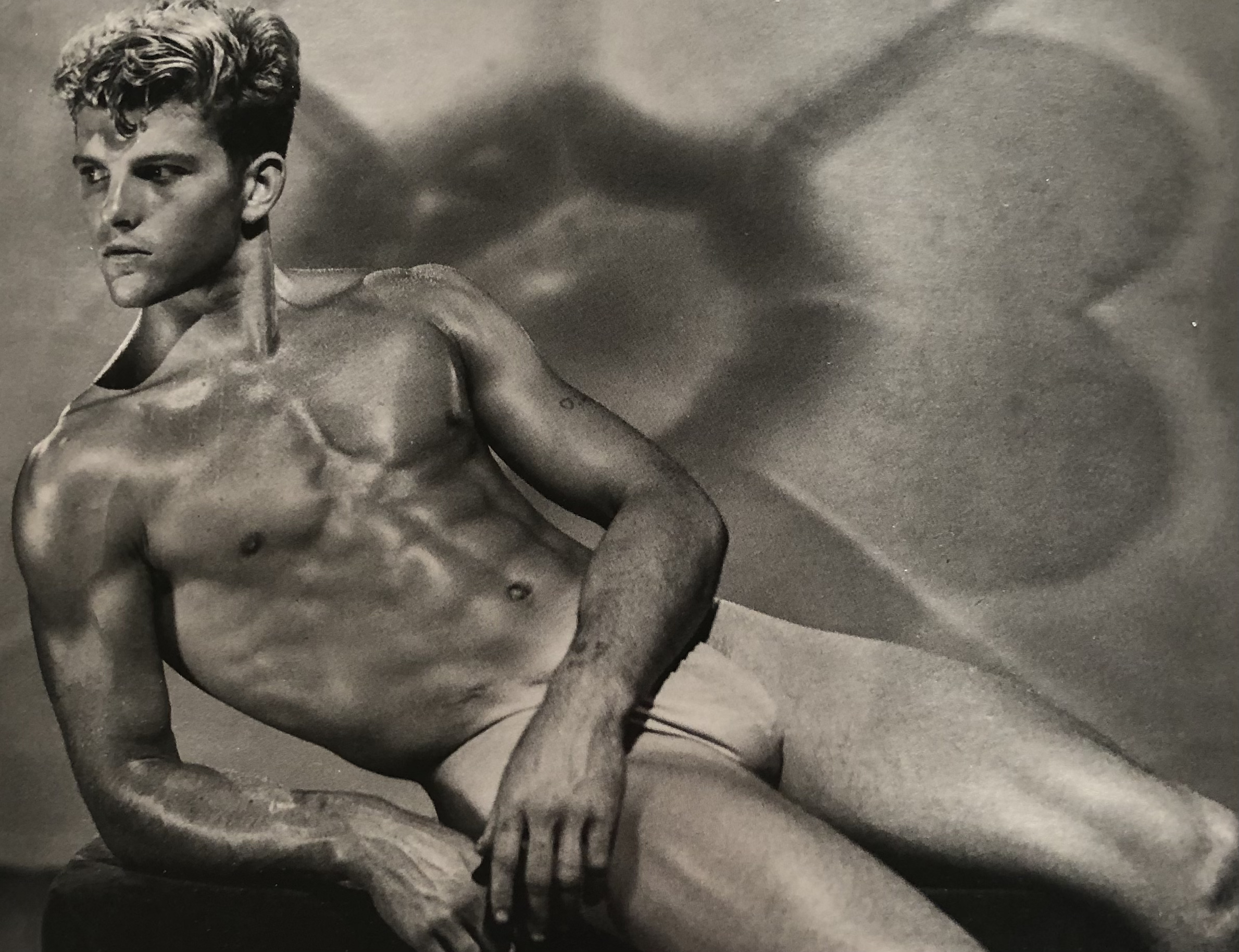
A 1950 photograph from physique studio Athletic Model Guild. Physique models were commonly photographed in "posing straps", the G-string-style undergarment worn here.

Physique photography is a tradition of photography of nude or semi-nude (usually muscular) men which was largely popular between the early 20th century and the 1960s. Physique photography originated with the physical culture and bodybuilding movements of the early 20th century, but was gradually co-opted by homosexual producers and consumers, who favoured increasingly homoerotic content. The practiced reached its height in the 1950s and early 1960s with the inception of physique magazines, which existed largely to showcase physique photographs and were widely consumed by a mostly-gay audience.

Physique photography fell out of fashion toward the end of the 1960s, supplanted by increasingly explicit pornography as a result of loosening legal definitions of obscenity. Physique photographers have provided inspiration to later artists such as Robert Mapplethorpe, and, towards the end of the 20th century, their work has come to be appreciated as art in its own right.

== History ==
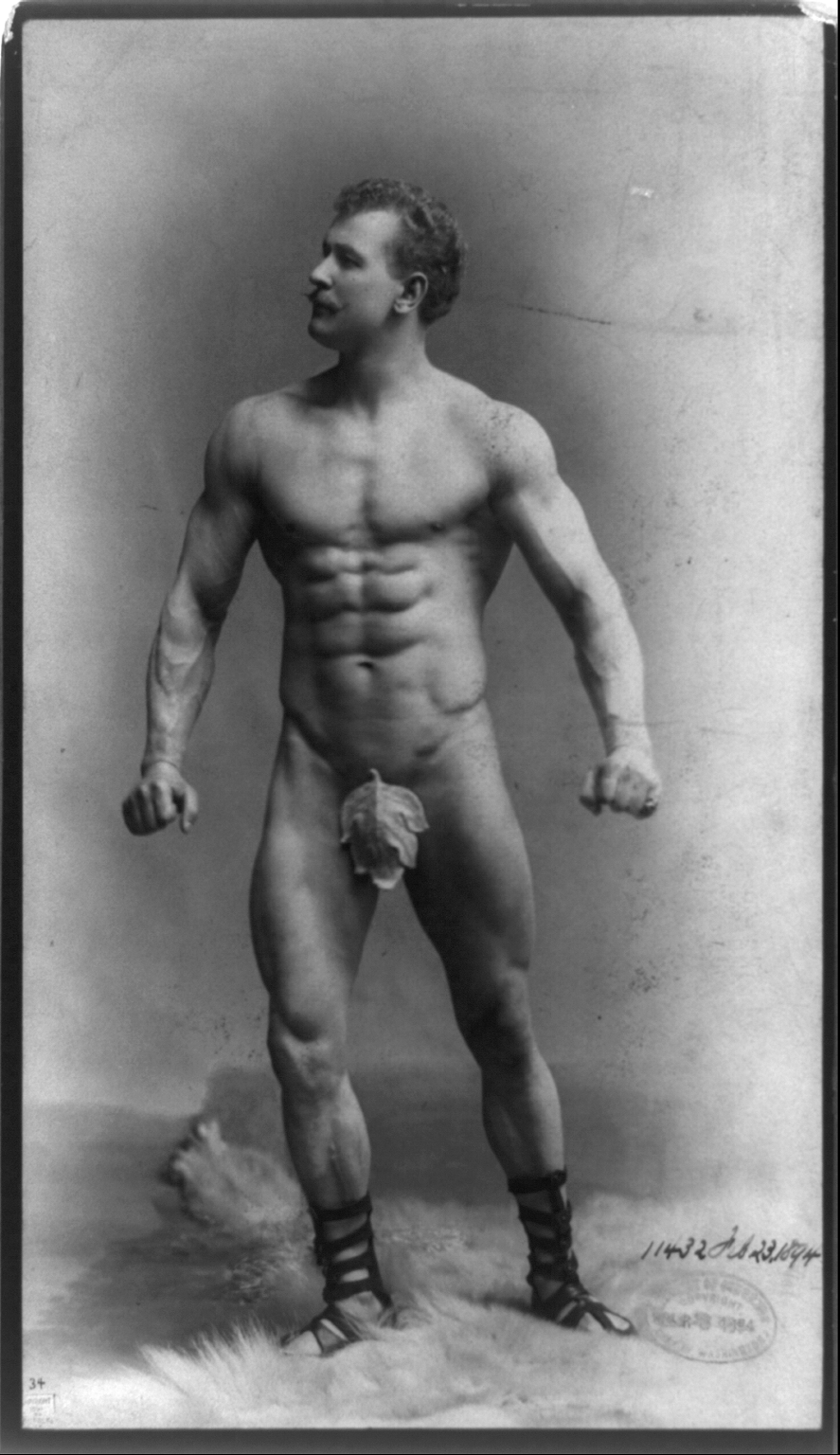
Eugen Sandow in 1894. Photographic depictions of the bodies of strongmen and athletes gained popularity through the early 20th century with the rise of the physical culture movement.

The early 20th century saw a sharp increase in interest in weightlifting and bodybuilding, partly spurred by the "physical culture" movement. Magazines devoted to physical culture began to appear in the 1890s with titles like Sandow's Magazine of Physical Culture (Physical Culture during its first year of publication) and increased in number and popularity through the early 20th century. Images of muscular athletes and bodybuilders also became common fodder in the wider press, and in visual media like postcards, which experienced a boom in popularity between 1900 and 1920.

By 1920, the demand for these photographs was sufficient to support photographers who dedicated themselves entirely to physique photography, such as John Hernic.

Scholar Thomas Waugh dates the first appearance of a "systematic crypto-gay subculture" working behind the scenes of the bodybuilding sphere to the 1930s. Gay physique photographers working during this era included Edwin F. Townsend, Earle Forbes, Robert Gebhart, Al Urban, Lon Hanagan, Lou Melan, Barton Horvath, and Dick Falcon (all but the last operating in New York City).

Another early nexus for gay men's involvement in the physique world were bodybuilding competitions. The first of the modern bodybuilding competitions, Mr. America, began in 1939. According to Bob Mizer, it was an "open secret" that gay men comprised a large portion of the audience for these competitions, in which men would display their muscled bodies on stage in skimpy costumes. Gay men also became involved behind-the-scenes in the bodybuilding community, organizing competitions, and working as event photographers.

In the early 1950s, the physique magazine began to appear as a genre, beginning with Bob Mizer's Physique Pictorial in 1951. While these magazines purported to be intended for fitness enthusiasts, like the physical culture and bodybuilding magazines that preceded them, they were in reality purchased almost entirely by gay men (and often produced by them). Compared to legitimate fitness magazines, they devoted their pages disproportionately to photography, including only perfunctory references to muscular development and exercises. They also tended to use models with more slender body types, and often featured more naturalistic poses.

Physique photography, along with the physique magazine genre, declined from the mid 1960s as relaxed legal standards for obscenity gave rise to increasingly hardcore pornography.

== As gay subculture ==
The network of (largely gay) physique photographers and their customers represent among the earliest gay subcultures. Sexologist Alfred Kinsey was the earliest researcher to recognize (as early as 1939) the connection between the physique field and male homosexuality. In the course of his research, Kinsey interviewed many physique photographers, customers, and models, and would go on to form a long friendship with photographer and publisher Bob Mizer. The archives of the Kinsey Institute now contain one of the most significant collections of physique photography and related documents in the world.

== Photographs ==
=== Explicitness ===
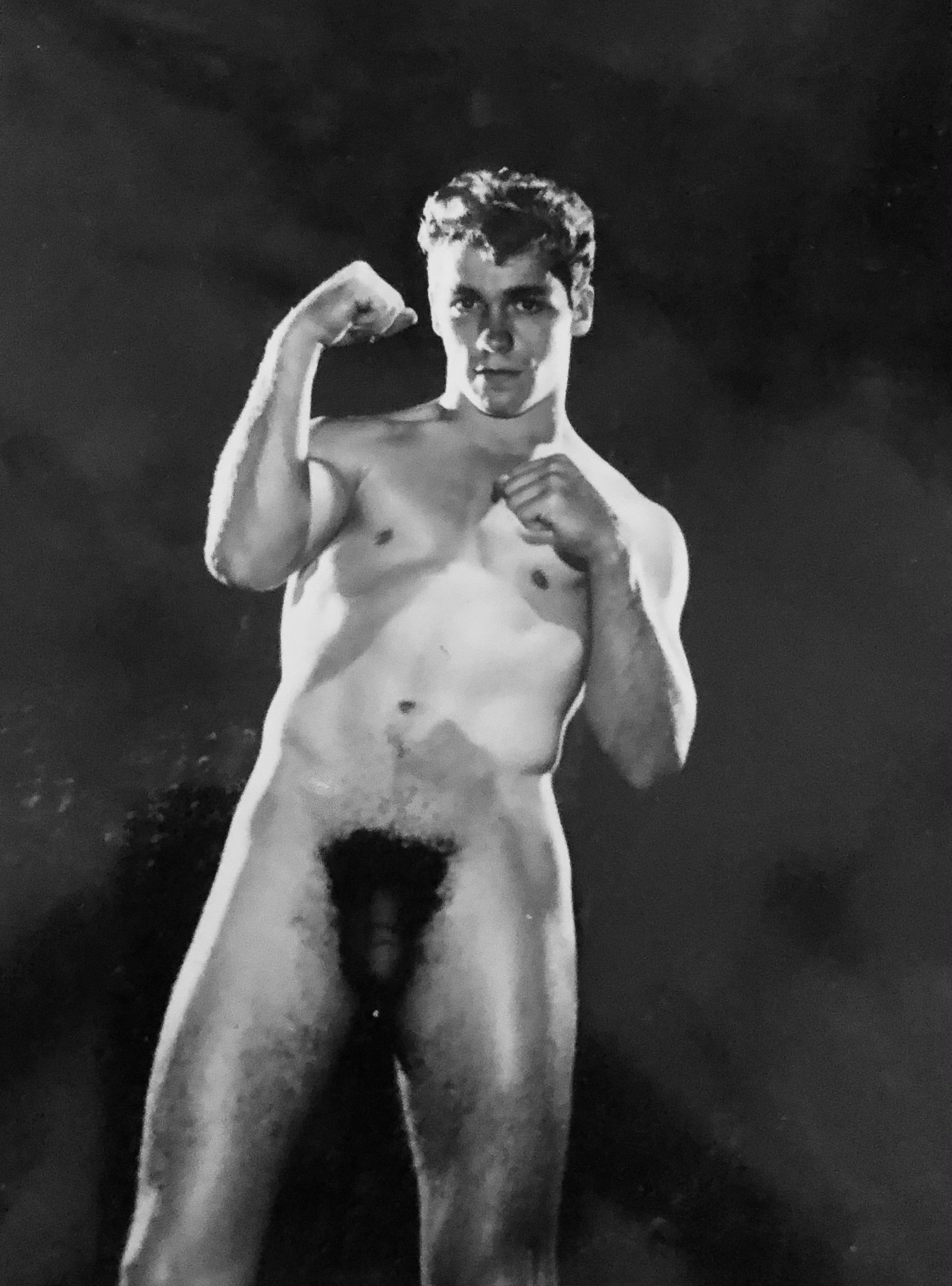
Photographs featuring frontal nudity such as this 1950s Bob Mizer photo could not be published, but were discreetly offered for sale directly to customers.

During the heyday of physique photography, photographers around the world were generally unable to include frontal nudity in any photos that were to be published in books or magazines, due to legal prohibitions against obscenity. However, many photographers took nude photos which they offered for sale directly to customers.

In published photos, models were most commonly attired in a "posing strap": a G-string-like undergarment which covered only the genitals. In other cases, models wore shorts, swim suits, or had their genitals obscured by a towel, sheet, or other object. Nude photos taken from behind were sometimes printable depending on local standards and laws.

Another practice was to doctor negatives or prints to add an "inked-in" posing strap to a nude photo, rendering it suitable for publication. This technique was especially common among early physique photographers of the 1930s, many of whom shot nearly exclusively in the nude.

By the 1970s, most physique photographers and studios were openly focusing on nude photography, abandoning the posing straps of the previous decades. Frontal nudity had become legally acceptable, though models could not necessarily be depicted with erections. In the UK, the illegality of depicting erections in photographs led to a workaround wherein a model's tumescent penis would be maneuvered to point downward, so that it could be plausibly claimed that they were not truly "erect".

=== Props, scenery, and costumes ===
Sometimes models were outfitted in archetypically masculine costumes, appearing as sailors, gladiators, wrestlers, or body builders.

=== Models ===
With the exception of a few popular models such as Glenn Bishop and Ed Fury, physique models were generally not well compensated. Writing in 1965, Clark Polak estimated that a typical model was paid between $5 and $100. Some studios, such as Canada's Mark One, did not pay models at all. Most models identified as heterosexual, and varied in their awareness of and attitude toward the gay audience for their photographs.

While some photographers maintained a strictly professional relationship with the models they photographed, others, such as John S. Barrington were known to regularly proposition models for sex. Others formed long-term (quasi-)romantic relationships with particular models, such as Bruce Bellas with Scotty Cunningham or Alonzo Hanagan and Raul Pacheco.

== Distribution ==
The most visible outlet for physique photographs was magazines - beginning with legitimate physical culture and bodybuilding magazines like Strength & Health, and later moving to dedicated physique magazines. The physique studios which provided photographs for physique magazines received little in the way of direct compensation from publishers; instead, the magazines served to advertise their mail order sales of photographs directly to readers. Many of the most prominent physique studios, such as those of Bruce Bellas and Lon of New York, started their own magazines, which essentially served as advertising catalogues.

Photographs which were sold directly to customers were often more explicit than the ones displayed in magazines. In the early 1950s, many serious bodybuilding magazines ceased printing physique photographers' advertisements, under pressure from the US Post Office. For example, Iron Man explained to readers that they had discontinued ads for photos "except those printed and bound in book form that can be inspected and approved by us", because "too many advertisers used their ads for the sale of nudes and questionable photos". It was this crackdown, in part, which led to the founding of physique magazines dedicated to homoerotic photography.

Because nude photographs were classified as obscene, some photographers sold them only in-person, to avoid prosecution by the Post Office. Some, such as Al Urban and Bruce Bellas, were known to travel the country to hand-deliver illicit photos.

== Legal challenges ==
American physique photographers who sent their work through the mail were liable to be investigated by postal inspectors. During the early to mid 20th century, the US Post Office vigorously enforced the Comstock laws against sending obscene materials through the mail. Most major photographers faced intimidating or arrest at various points in their career, with many, including Bob Mizer and John Barrington, being jailed as a result.

To avoid discovery, physique photographers (whether professional or amateur) were often forced to develop their own film (or find a sympathetic party to develop it for them), especially in the case of nude photographs. Because Kodak had strict control over the development of 16 mm color film, physique films were long limited to black and white, which could be developed by third-party labs or by the photographers themselves.

== Notable photographers ==
Photographer	Aliases	Notes
Gregor Arax	Arax	A Greek national who operated out of Paris under the mononym Arax. Took some of the most notable photographs of Steve Reeves. Active beginning in the 1920s. Heterosexual. In 1950, he had his photographs seized by authorities, and was subject to legal harassment in the following two years.
Alonzo Hanagan	Lon of New York	
Russ Warner	Warner	A California photographer known for his photography of Steve Reeves. In 1955, his studio was raided by police, leading to one of his models being fired from the Oakland Fire Department.
Bruce Bellas	Bruce of Los Angeles	
Robert Gebhart	Gebbé	Active in the United States in the 1950s and 1960s.
John S. Barrington	John Paignton	Also worked as a sculptor, journalist, and author.
Ron Ferrero	Lon of London	Former assistant to Lon of New York.
John Graham	Doric	Operated out of Knightsbridge, and often used local guardsmen as models.
G. Rodney Crowther		Worked closely with entrepreneur H. Lynn Womack.
Anthony Guyther	Vulcan Studios	Originally based in New York City, but later formed a close association with H. Lynn Womack and moved to Washington, D.C.
Frederick Kovert	Kovert of Hollywood	Former silent film actor, active in the 1930s and 1940s. Bob Mizer began his career apprenticing with Kovert.
George Haimsohn	Plato	
Dick Falcon		A bodybuilder who began photographing others in the 1930s. Located in Columbus, Ohio.
Barton Horvath		Born 1912. Began operating in New York City in the 1930s.
Al Urban		Among the most prominent photographers of the post-war "golden age" of physique photography.
Jean Ferrero		A heterosexual photographer in Nice, France.

=== Studios ===
Studio	Head	Location	Notes
Galaxy	George Stockton	Richmond, London	
Kris Studios	Dom Orejudos and Chuck Renslow	Chicago	

== See also ==
- Nude photography
- Nude photography (art)
- Glamour photography
- Erotic photography
- Beefcake
- Pin-up model
