= Tomorrow's Man =

Physique magazine

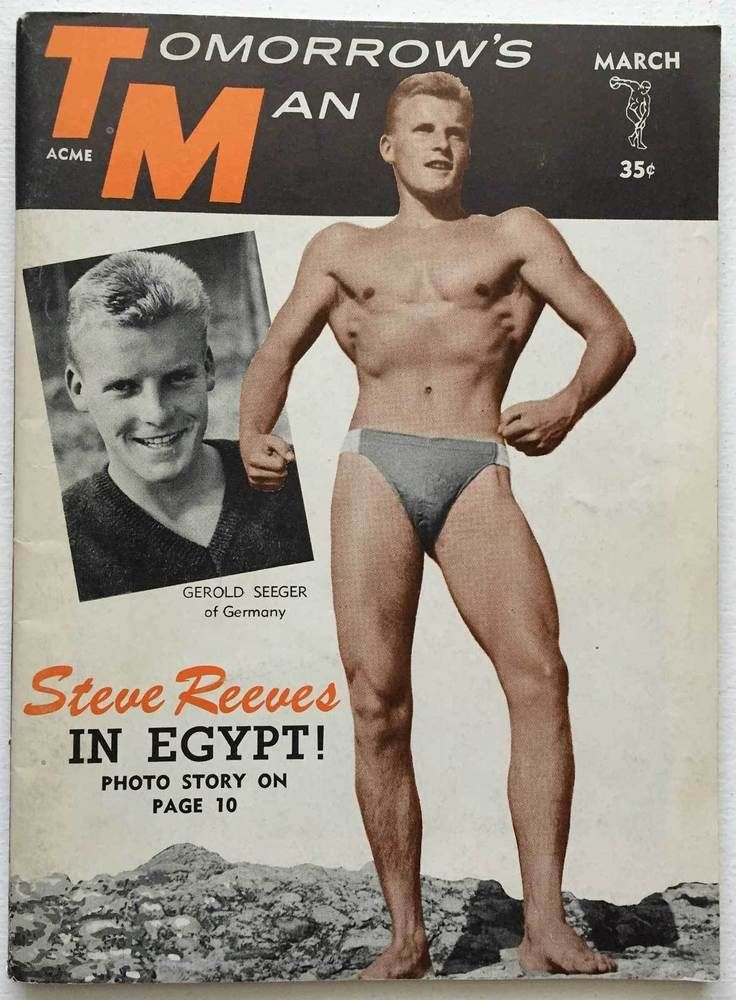
- The March 1963 issue of Tomorrow's Man
- Publisher: Tomorrow's Man Publishing Co.
- First issue: 1952
- Final issue: 1971
- OCLC: 18535079

Tomorrow's Man was a digest size physique magazine published from 1952 to 1971. It was one of the first physique magazines, debuting a year after Bob Mizer's Physique Pictorial. It was the creation of Irvin ("Irv") Johnson, a Chicago gym owner and trainer. As of 1957, it had the highest circulation of any physique magazine in the United States. It was the first of many physique magazines to feature the artwork of Dom Orejudos (under the pen name Etienne). Tomorrow's Man was initially edited by William Bunton, who went on to work for competing magazine VIM in May 1954.

The magazine included short articles about exercise and nutrition, and was ostensibly aimed at young men wishing to improve their physique. Johnson used the magazine to promote his bodybuilding program and dietary supplements.

According to a 1965 article in Drum magazine by editor Clark Polak, Tomorrow's Man went from distributing "a few hundred" copies of its first issue to having monthly sales of 100,000 within its first two years. Polak described Tomorrow's Man as being among the most "conservative" of the physique magazines, and thus resistant to being pulled from newsstands, compared to competing publications (particularly those published by Lynn Womack's Guild Press), which attempted to push the limits of lewd content.

It was the first physique magazine to feature model Glenn Bishop, who would become one of the most well-known and prolific physique models in the industry. Bishop appeared in the premiere issue, and modeled exclusively for Tomorrow's Man for two years, until 1954 when he began to appear in other physique magazines.

Irvin Johnson sold the magazine in 1955, and it was subsequently published from New York. The editorial in the August 1955 issue, signed by new editor-in-chief Paul Lange, announced that the magazine would no longer exclusively promote the "Irvin Johnson system" of bodybuilding.

An advertisement for "Irvin Johnson's Hi-Protein Tablets" from the first issue of Tomorrow's Man. While he controlled the magazine, Johnson frequently used it to advertise his training methods and products.
