= Strength & Health =

American bodybuilding magazine

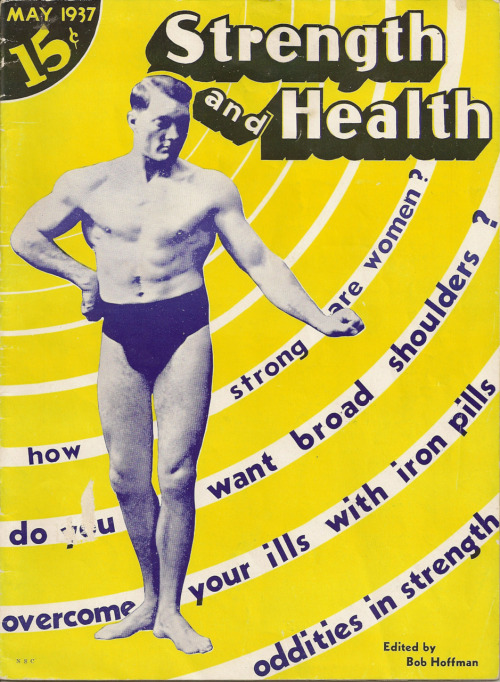
- May 1937 issue
- Founder: Bob Hoffman
- Founded: 1932
- Final issue Number: 1986; 54
- Company: York Barbell Company
- Country: USA
- Based in: York, Pennsylvania
- OCLC: 2251991

Strength & Health was a bodybuilding/fitness/Olympic weightlifting magazine, one of the earliest magazines devoted to fitness and bodybuilding. Until the late 1960s, it was the most popular weightlifting magazine in the United States.

== History ==
The magazine was published between 1932 and 1986 in 54 Volumes, a volume a year in 6 parts, published every 2–3 months. It was published by York Barbell Company, which was established by Bob Hoffman.

In the 1940s, several early gay physique photographers, including Bob Mizer, contributed photos to the magazine and advertised homoerotic (sometimes nude) photographs in its back pages. This eventually gave rise to physique magazines designed for gay audiences, starting with Mizer's Physique Pictorial in 1951. In an article titled "Let Me Tell You a Fairy Tale", the editors of Strength & Health decried the emergence of "homosexual magazines", warning of their corrupting influence on youth.

== Editors ==
Its first editor was Lithuanian-born weightlifter Walter Zagurski. Managing editors during the magazine's history included: George F. Jowett, Gord Venables, Jim Murray, Ray Van Cleef, Harry Paschall, Bob Hasse, John Grimek, Terry Todd, Tommy Suggs, and Jan Dellinger.
