= Bruce Bellas =

American photographer (1909–1974)

Bruce Harry Bellas
- Born: Bruce Harry Bellas; July 7, 1909; Alliance, Nebraska, U.S.
- Died: July 1974 (aged 64–65); Canada
- Burial place: Forest Lawn Memorial Park, Hollywood Hills, California, U.S.
- Other name: Bruce of Los Angeles
- Occupation: Photographer
- Known for: Physique photography

Bruce Harry Bellas (July 7, 1909 – July 1974) was an American photographer. He was influential in his work with male physiques and nudes. Bellas was well known under the pseudonym Bruce of Los Angeles.

== History and influence ==
Bruce Harry Bellas was born in Alliance, Nebraska on July 7, 1909. He worked as a chemistry teacher there until 1947, when he began photographing bodybuilders in Los Angeles, California, beginning with taking pictures of bodybuilding competitions. In 1956, Bellas launched his own magazine, The Male Figure. Among physique photographers, Bellas' work was noted for having a distinctly campy, tongue-in-cheek sensibility. Bellas also produced a number of early homoerotic 8 mm films with titles such as Cowboy Washup and Big Gun for Hire.

Bellas was known to travel around the country, finding new models to photograph and also personally delivering nude photographs to customers, since they were liable to be seized by postal inspectors if sent through the mail.

An extensive archive of Bellas' nude male physique photographs exists today, largely intact. His impact on physique photography is largely felt and recognized, and the works of Robert Mapplethorpe, Herb Ritts, and Bruce Weber are widely considered to be influenced by Bellas' pioneering style. In 1990, the Wessel O'Connor Gallery in New York and the Jan Kesner Gallery in Los Angeles both exhibited a wide array of Bellas' work, furthering modern recognition of his impact.

Bellas died while on vacation in Canada in July 1974. He was buried at Forest Lawn Memorial Park in the Hollywood Hills on August 9. Bellas was in a long-term relationship with favorite model Scotty Cunningham, to whom he left his estate.

== Monographs ==
- Bellas, Bruce Harry; Dolisnky, Jim (1990). Bruce of Los Angeles (in German). Berlin: Gmünder. ISBN 978-3-924163-65-5.
- Bellas, Bruce Harry; Bentley, Kevin; Mainardi, Robert (2000). The Naked Heartland: The Itinerant Photography of Bruce of Los Angeles. Simon's Town, South Africa: Janssen. ISBN 978-3-925443-88-6.
- Bellas, Bruce Harry; Aletti, Vince (2008). Bruce of Los Angeles. New York: Antinous Press. ISBN 978-1-57687-469-1.
