= David K. Johnson =

American historian and author

David Johnson
- Born: David Kenneth Johnson c. 1962 (age c. 63); Keene, New Hampshire, United States
- Education: Georgetown University (BA); Northwestern University (PhD)
- Occupation: Historian
- Employer: University of South Florida
- Title: Professor

David K. Johnson (born c. 1962) is an American historian and author who has taught at the University of South Florida since 2003. He specializes in LGBT and gender history in the 20th-century United States.

His first book, The Lavender Scare, was made into a documentary film that garnered best documentary awards at over a dozen film festivals and broadcast nationwide on PBS June 18, 2019. His second book, Buying Gay: How Physique Entrepreneurs Sparked a Movement chronicles the rise of a gay commercial network in the years leading up to the Stonewall Riots. It was released in March 2019 by Columbia University Press in its series on "Columbia Studies in the History of U.S. Capitalism". It was featured in a starred review in Publishers Weekly.

A nationally recognized authority on LGBT history, Johnson has contributed to government reports and amicus briefs that document a history of discrimination and thereby seek to expand civil rights protections and create a more inclusive educational curriculum. He contributed to the National Park Foundation’s study "LGBTQ America: A Theme Study of Lesbian, Gay, Bisexual, Transgender and Queer History".

Johnson, who is gay, earned a BA from Georgetown University and a PhD from Northwestern University, both in history. He has enjoyed fellowships from the National Humanities Center, the Smithsonian Institution, and the Social Science Research Council. As a professor in the History Department at the University of South Florida, he teaches courses on the post-1945 U.S. and the history of gender and sexuality.
