= H. Lynn Womack =

American publisher (1923–1985)

Womack receiving an award in 1971

Herman Lynn Womack (1923–1985) was an American publisher, and the founder of Guild Press, a Washington, D.C., publishing house that catered almost exclusively to a gay male audience and played a major role in expanding the legal protections for gay publications against obscenity laws in the United States.

== Biography ==
Womack was born in Hazlehurst, Mississippi, in 1923 to tenant farmers. His father was an alcoholic who was incarcerated for murdering his best friend. Womack began school at the University of Mississippi, but transferred to George Washington University in Washington, D.C., to complete his degree and to pursue graduate studies. He earned an M.A. in psychology.

By 1946, Womack came to terms with his homosexuality and ended his marriage to his second wife. This coincided with the collapse of one of his business ventures, the Howell Academy, a private boarding school at which Womack reportedly was rarely present. After the closing of the Howell Academy, Womack enrolled in a Ph.D. program in philosophy at Johns Hopkins University, receiving his doctorate in 1955. After completing his Ph.D., he became an adjunct professor of Philosophy at the George Washington University.

After he was dismissed from his position at George Washington University, he gained an appointment at Mary Washington College in Fredericksburg, Virginia, but found it unsatisfying.

In 1957, Womack became involved in a fraudulent investment scheme. Through a holding company, Womack invested in a Maryland start-up, Polytronics Research, whose stock price subsequently soared when it was falsely claimed that it had secured a lucrative government contract. The fraud was ultimately detected by the SEC, but Womack escaped prosecution, as investigators judged that he was merely a "naive academic" who had been roped in by co-conspirators. He made half a million dollars from the scheme, which would serve as initial capital for Guild Press and allow him to leave academia.

He was a heavyset man and an albino.

== Publishing career ==
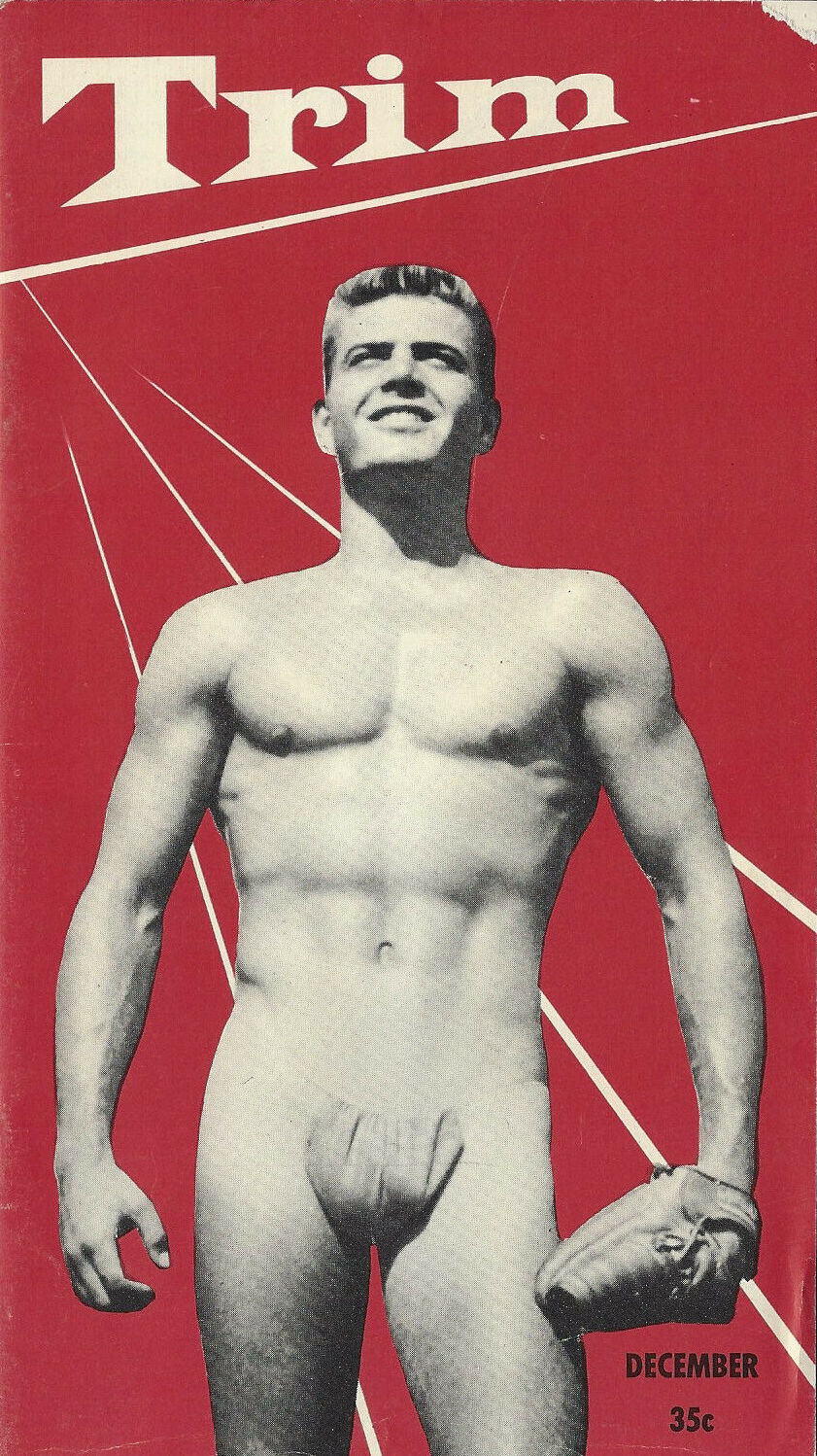
1957 cover of TRIM, the first of several physique magazines that Womack would acquire or found

=== Beginnings: MANual Enterprises ===
Womack's 1957 investment scheme allowed him to acquire a small printing plant in Washington, D.C. With this printing press, he developed MANual Enterprises, an earlier incarnation of the Guild Press. Womack initially focused on physique magazines, being an avid reader of them himself. He acquired the magazine TRIM from Randolph Benson, after reading an advertisement for the sale of the publication in the November 1957 issue of another Benson magazine, Grecian Guild Pictorial. By 1960, he had also acquired Grecian Guild Pictorial, MANual (a Chicago physique art publication), and Fizeek.

Womack found success in the physique magazine business by establishing relationships with distributors to ensure his magazines would be widely sold at newsstands, a common difficulty for physique publications at the time. He also formed close relationships with physique photographers, particularly Anthony Guyther and G. Rodney Crowther, who would supply many of the photographs for his magazines.

By 1960, Guild Press became a profitable publishing enterprise under Womack's leadership as publisher and sole proprietor and was printing art and physique magazines and providing a national mail-order business.

=== Obscenity charges and confinement (1960–1962) ===
In January 1960, Womack was arrested, alongside photographers Anthony Guyther and G. Rodney Crowther, charged with sending obscene materials through the mail. In March, he was convicted on multiple counts of obscenity. The charges carried a sentence between one and three years, but Womack was allowed his freedom pending an appeal. The same year, Guild Press magazines were seized in Virginia, being deemed unmailable by the US Post Office.

In November 1960, Womack's printing plant was raided by the Morals Division of the Washington Police Department. He was brought up on a second set of charges for conspiracy to send obscene materials through the mail. As a result of these new charges, the judge who oversaw Womack's earlier case revoked his bond, sending him to prison to serve out his one to three-year sentence. Womack took a plea deal in the second set of charges, adding an additional four to fourteen months of prison time.

Womack managed to avoid jail time by contriving to serve his sentence at a federal psychiatric hospital, St. Elizabeths Hospital. At the time, homosexuality was still viewed as a mental illness, and Womack, who had a degree in psychology, was able to manipulate the doctors who interviewed him to ensure an appropriate diagnosis. Womack continued to operate his business while confined to St. Elizabeths. Describing the experience in a later interview, he said: "It was very pleasant. I had a private room, TV, typewriter". In his biography of Samuel Steward, Justin Spring characterizes Womack's hospitalization instead as a move "to avoid his creditors".

=== Manual Enterprises v. J. Edward Day (1962) ===
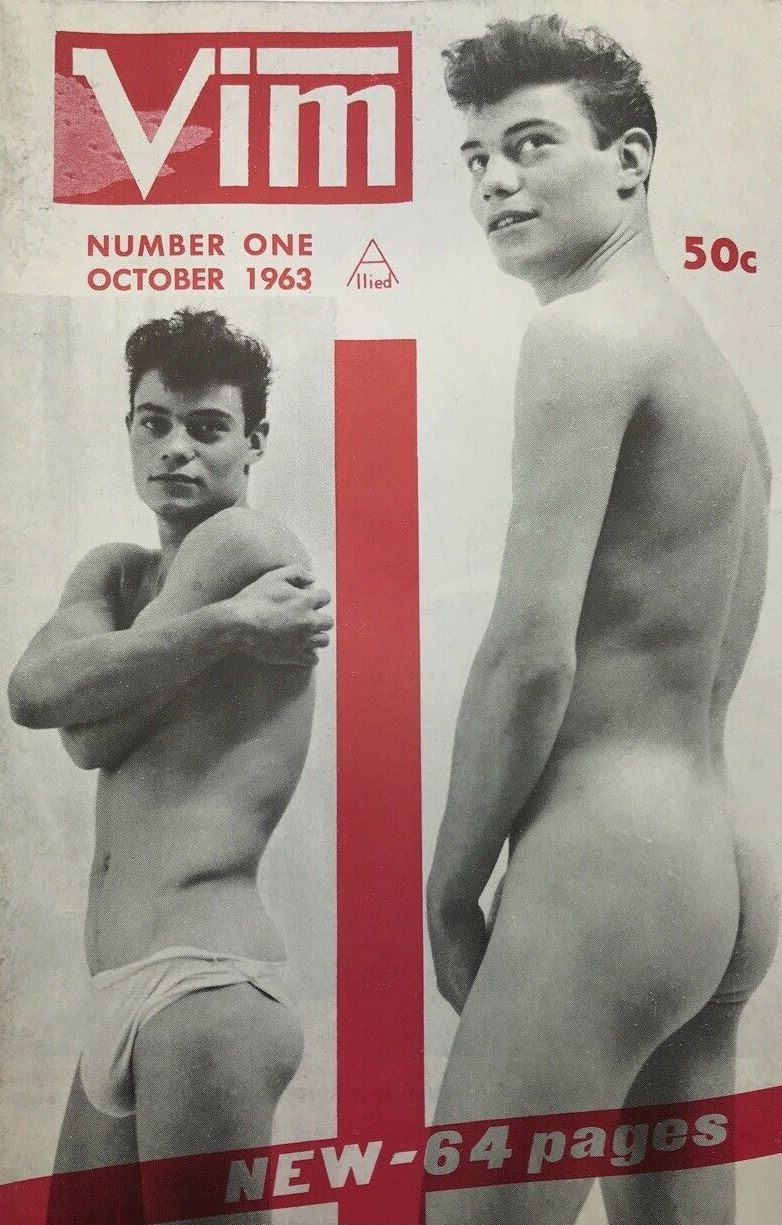
The cover of the first issue of VIM following Womack's relaunch of the title in 1963

Womack appealed his original conviction all the way to the Supreme Court, which granted certiorari, hearing oral arguments in 1962. At issue were three of the Guild Press's publications: MANual, Trim, and Grecian Guild Pictorial. Womack was represented by his attorney, Stanley Dietz, who had never before argued a case before the Supreme Court. MANual Enterprises v. Day was the first case involving homosexuality that was argued before the Supreme Court. The court had taken one earlier case involving homosexuality in 1958, One, Inc. v. Olesen, but it was the subject of a per curiam decision, and thus was not the subject of oral arguments.

Womack ultimately won the case, thereby carving out greater freedoms for gay publications throughout the United States, and establishing that erotica intended for gay males was "not obscene as a matter of law".

In the aftermath of his Supreme Court victory, Womack revived the distribution of his physique magazines, which had been suspended for much of 1962, and sought to ramp up production even further, acquiring a new printing press, relocating to a larger plant, and launching new publications like VIM (a defunct physique magazine which Womack acquired and relaunched in 1963), and the leather-oriented magazine Mars, edited by partners Chuck Renslow and Dom Orejudos.

=== Book publishing ===
Womack's mail order business, Guild Book Service, started in 1964, distributed a regular bulletin to members with reviews of selections. In its first bulletin, Guild Book Service announce that it had "been organized primarily as a service to meet the needs of the subscribers to the various publications of Guild Press, Ltd. We will provide a critical evaluation of much of the material now flooding certain areas of specialized interest and will make these materials available as efficiently and economically as possible." The Guild Book Service goals were to bring the "collective output of gay titles and provide them to a newly defined gay reading public."

The Guild Book Service offered a wide range of material, including serious literary works with gay themes, pulpy erotic fiction, and campy novelties like The Gay Coloring Book.

At first, Guild Press merely acted as a middleman, curating and distributing works from other publishers. Soon after, it became a publishing house in its own right, reprinting gay-themed literature from years past as well as original works, most notably Samuel Steward's 1966 erotic novel $TUD.

Towards the end of the decade, books published by Guild Press became increasingly sexually explicit and pornographic in tone. This was partly due to a shifting legal climate following the court victory of DSI Sales of Minneapolis, which emboldened publishers of gay magazines and books. From 1969 to 1970, Womack developed the "Black Knight Classics" imprint. Carrying the subtitle "Classics of the Homosexual Underground", the stories published under this label were purported to be classic works of gay erotica which were clandestinely passed from hand-to-hand among gay men in decades prior, though many were in fact of recent vintage.

Example entries from Guild Book Service catalog

The Gay Coloring Book, a campy coloring book featuring suggestive scenes centered on "Percy", a flamboyant dandy

On the Cause of Homosexuality, one of the non-fictional works offered by Guild Book Service, a sociological treatise on homosexuality

Down There on a Visit, a serious 1962 novel by gay author Christopher Isherwood

Guild press also offered reprints of gay classics, such as the 1931 novel Twilight Men—the catalog editor describes it as the first gay novel he ever read.

Male Bride, an example of erotic gay pulp fiction. The Book Service is frank in its description of the book as mere "purple passion" and a "time killer".

The Guild Book Service catalog included advertisements for Guild Press's various physique magazines, and in turn, those physique magazines regularly included inserts advertising the latest Book Service offerings.

=== Other business ventures ===
At its height, Womack's business enterprises included Guild Press; Guild Book Service, its mail order distribution service; the Grecian Guild; the Potomac News Company; the Mark II gay cinema (808 K St NW in Washington, D.C.); and Village Books, a chain of bookstores along the East Coast. In Washington, D.C., there were Village Books outlets at 819 13 St NW and at 14th and H Streets NW. Womack also sold clothing, mostly underwear and posing straps, inspired by the success of other clothing retailers targeting a gay male market such as Ah Men of West Hollywood and Regency Square of New York.

Through the 1960s and 1970s, Womack ran his businesses through partners and subordinates, such as J. J. Proferes (also owner of DC's Metropole Cinema), Henry Pryba, and Raymond Pechin.

=== Dispute with Samuel Steward ===
In March 1964, Samuel Steward (a.k.a. Phil Andros) met H. Lynn Womack in New York to discuss the publication of a collection of short stories that he had been working on. The lunch meeting between Steward and Womack was productive, and Womack ultimately decided to publish Steward's book $tud. By late 1965, the final manuscript had been submitted, and $tud was slated to be published in 1966.

Unfortunately, due to Womack's legal and financial problems, the publication of $tud was delayed for more than three years. Because Womack was hiding in St. Elizabeth's Hospital and refusing to return Steward's calls, Steward was unable to buy back the rights to his manuscript and had to wait until Womack could pull together the money to finish the production of his book The text block of the books had been printed in 1966 but had sat for three years with no bindings.

By 1969, Steward found another publisher (J. Brian) willing to publish a cheap paperback edition of $tud. Utilizing an escape clause in the contract, Steward agreed to allowing J. Brian to publish the paperback edition. Womack retaliated by immediately having the unbound books in his warehouse bound, but instead of selling or distributing them to bookstores, had them remaindered which meant that Steward would never earn any royalties.

=== Later legal problems ===
In 1970, Womack decided to launch a short-lived gay newspaper, The Gay Forum, with national distribution. Womack's new venture into the newspaper business quickly floundered due in large part to renewed prosecution of Guild Press and Womack on charges of using underage models in the increasingly photo-illustrated publications produced by Guild Press. In April 1970, the FBI conducted major raids on adult bookstores up and down the Eastern Seaboard of the United States.

As part of a plea bargain reached in 1971 to reduce Womack's sentence from two-and-a-half years to six months, Womack agreed to legally separate himself from his adult businesses, including the Guild Press. Guild Press ceased nearly all publishing within two years and was bankrupt by 1974.

== Later life ==
In the 1970s, after the end of his connection with Guild Press and its ultimate demise, Womack moved to Boca Raton, Florida, where he died in 1985.

== Publications ==
=== Physique magazines ===
- Fizeek
- Grecian Guild Pictorial
- Manorama
- MANual
- Trim

=== Book series ===
- Black Knight Classics (gay male erotica)
- Roadhouse Classics (gay male erotica)
- Stuart House Classics (heterosexual erotica)

== See also ==
- List of gay pornographic magazines
- Clark Polak
