= Bob Mizer =

American photographer and filmmaker (1922–1992)

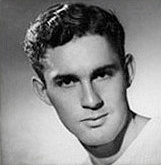
- Mizer at age 20, c. 1942
- Born: Robert Henry Mizer; March 27, 1922; Hailey, Idaho, U.S.
- Died: May 12, 1992 (aged 70); Los Angeles, California, U.S.
- Known for: Photography; Film
- Website: bobmizer.org

Robert Henry Mizer (March 27, 1922 – May 12, 1992) was an American photographer and filmmaker, known for pushing boundaries of depicting male homoerotic content with his work in the mid 20th century.

== Biography ==
Bob Mizer's earliest photographs appeared in 1942, in both color and black and white. He began his photography career apprenticing with former silent film star Frederick Kovert, who operated a physique studio in Hollywood.

In spite of societal expectations and pressure from law enforcement, Mizer built a veritable empire on his beefcake photographs and films. He established the influential studio, the Athletic Model Guild (AMG) in 1945, but by the time he published the first issue of Physique Pictorial he was operating the studio on his own at his home near downtown Los Angeles. He photographed thousands of men, building a collection that includes nearly two million different images and thousands of films and videotapes.

In the 1950s, several photographers were doing similar work, such as Alonzo Hanagan (Lon of New York) in New York City, Douglas Juleff (Douglas of Detroit) in Michigan, Don Whitman (of Western Photography Guild) in Denver, Colorado, Russ Warner (in Oakland, California), and Bruce Bellas (Bruce of Los Angeles) in Los Angeles.

Mizer continued to pursue his vision, influencing artists like Robert Mapplethorpe and David Hockney. Over time he captured on film the career beginnings of a number of soon-to-be Hollywood actors, including Glenn Corbett, Tab Hunter and Dennis Cole.

Examples of Mizer's work are now held by esteemed educational and cultural institutions the world over, and can be found in various books, galleries, and private art collections. New York University's 80 Washington Square East Gallery presented what it called "the first major institutional solo presentation of Bob Mizer's work to be shown anywhere in the world" in early 2014, where artists Bruce Yonemoto, Karen Finley and Vaginal Davis added to NYU's scholarship on Mizer. The New York Times reported that the exhibition "makes a good case for [Mizer] as an artist with interests and imagination considerably more expansive than what his popular reputation suggests."

In 1999, Beefcake, a docudrama directed by Thom Fitzgerald, was produced, inspired by a picture book by F. Valentine Hooven III (published by Taschen).

== Legal challenges ==
Mizer was repeatedly targeted by authorities in relation to his trade in photographs and film. In 1945, he was visited by US postal inspectors, who searched his room and found "dirty pictures", but he avoided prosecution. Mizer was investigated again in 1947 after a man told police that Mizer had sold him nude photographs. As a result of the investigation, Mizer was arrested for contributing to the delinquency of a minor, after it was found he had taken nude photographs of a seventeen-year-old, James Maynor. He was sentenced to six months at a prison farm in Saugus, California.

Mizer used a set of codes to record information about the temperament, physical characteristics, and sexual proclivities of AMG models, and covertly shared this information with photographers and others to whom he would loan out models. This practice led to an arrest by the Los Angeles vice squad for running a prostitution ring. He was convicted, and author Jeffrey Escoffier speculates that he was imprisoned for part of 1968 as a result, explaining a lapse in the run of Physique Pictorial that year.

== Films ==
Mizer produced over 3,000 film titles from the early 1950s to the early 1980s. In August 1980, he began using the then-new technology of VHS, and recorded over 7500 hours of his photo sessions until his death in 1992.

=== Partial filmography ===
- Advice Without Consent (1955)
- Alladin (1956)
- Motorcycle Thief (1958)
- Andy & The Angry Mummy (1963)
- Tijuana Bandit (1964)
- Joe Dallesandro Posing (1966)
- The Marine, the Cop and the Youth (1966)
- Love 2001 (1970)
