= 1989 in Canada =

- Decades: 1960s; 1970s; 1980s; 1990s; 2000s
- See also: History of Canada; Timeline of Canadian history; List of years in Canada

Events from the year 1989 in Canada.

== Incumbents ==
=== Crown ===
- Monarch – Elizabeth II

=== Federal government ===
- Governor General – Jeanne Sauvé
- Prime Minister – Brian Mulroney
- Chief Justice – Brian Dickson (Manitoba)
- Parliament – 34th

=== Provincial governments ===
==== Lieutenant governors ====
- Lieutenant Governor of Alberta – Helen Hunley
- Lieutenant Governor of British Columbia – David Lam
- Lieutenant Governor of Manitoba – George Johnson
- Lieutenant Governor of New Brunswick – Gilbert Finn
- Lieutenant Governor of Newfoundland – James McGrath
- Lieutenant Governor of Nova Scotia – Alan Abraham (until February 20) then Lloyd Crouse
- Lieutenant Governor of Ontario – Lincoln Alexander
- Lieutenant Governor of Prince Edward Island – Lloyd MacPhail
- Lieutenant Governor of Quebec – Gilles Lamontagne
- Lieutenant Governor of Saskatchewan – Sylvia Fedoruk

==== Premiers ====
- Premier of Alberta – Don Getty
- Premier of British Columbia – Bill Vander Zalm
- Premier of Manitoba – Gary Filmon
- Premier of New Brunswick – Frank McKenna
- Premier of Newfoundland – Brian Peckford (until March 22) then Tom Rideout (March 22 to May 5) then Clyde Wells
- Premier of Nova Scotia – John Buchanan
- Premier of Ontario – David Peterson
- Premier of Prince Edward Island – Joe Ghiz
- Premier of Quebec – Robert Bourassa
- Premier of Saskatchewan – Grant Devine

=== Territorial governments ===
==== Commissioners ====
- Commissioner of Yukon – John Kenneth McKinnon
- Commissioner of Northwest Territories – John Havelock Parker (until October 2) then Daniel L. Norris

==== Premiers ====
- Premier of the Northwest Territories – Dennis Patterson
- Premier of Yukon – Tony Penikett

== Events ==
- January 1: The Canadian-American Free Trade Agreement comes into effect.
- January 21: Newfoundland premier Brian Peckford announces his resignation from politics, giving the PC Party 2 months to find a replacement as party leader and premier.
- January 30: Prime Minister Brian Mulroney shuffles his cabinet, appointing 6 new ministers and reassigning the responsibilities of 19 others.
- February 10: President of the United States George H. W. Bush Prime Minister Mulroney in Ottawa, laying the groundwork for the Acid Rain Treaty of 1991.
- February 20: In the Yukon Territory, the ruling New Democrats narrowly maintain control of the Yukon Legislative Assembly, winning 9 seats vs. the Progressive Conservative Party's 7.
- March 1: The Canadian Space Agency is created.
- March 10: An Air Ontario flight crashes near Dryden, Ontario, killing 24.
- March 13: 2:44 AM ET: A solar coronal mass ejection causes a blackout across all of Quebec, as it hits the Hydro-Québec power grid, affecting 6 million people for more than 9 hours.
- March 13: Deborah Grey wins a by-election to become the first Reform Party Member of Parliament.
- March 19: LGBT activist Joe Rose is murdered on public transit in Montreal.
- March 20: Alberta election: Don Getty's PCs win a sixth consecutive majority.
- March 22: Thomas Rideout becomes premier of Newfoundland, replacing Brian Peckford.
- April 20: The Liberal Party of Newfoundland, led by Clyde Wells, wins the Newfoundland general election.
- May 3: John Turner resigns as leader of the Liberal Party of Canada.
- May 5: Clyde Wells becomes premier of Newfoundland, defeating Thomas Rideout in a general election.
- May 25: The Calgary Flames defeat the Montreal Canadiens to win the 1989 Stanley Cup Final.
- May 29: The Liberal Party of Prince Edward Island, led by Joe Ghiz, remains in power following the Prince Edward Island general election.
- June 3: The SkyDome (now known as Rogers Centre) is opened in Toronto.
- June 5: The federal government announces sweeping cuts to Via Rail.
- July 31: Cable television network CBC Newsworld is launched.
- August 2: Minister of Consumer and Corporate Affairs Bernard Valcourt resigns after he is convicted of drunk driving.
- September 1: French cable sports network, RDS, signs on.
- September 25: In the Quebec general election, the Quebec Liberal Party, led by Robert Bourassa, is reelected with a large Liberal majority.
- October 6: Prime Minister Mulroney nominates Ray Hnatyshyn to succeed Jeanne Sauvé as Governor General of Canada.
- October 8: The Cormier Village hayride accident kills 13 people and injures 45.
- October 15 – Wayne Gretzky becomes the leading scorer in the history of the National Hockey League.
- December 2: Audrey McLaughlin is elected head of the NDP replacing Ed Broadbent becoming the first female major party leader in Canadian history.
- December 6: École Polytechnique massacre: Marc Lépine murders fourteen women at the École Polytechnique of the Université de Montréal in Montreal, Quebec. The event proves a spur to both the Canadian feminist and gun control movements.
- December 21: Quebec uses the notwithstanding clause for the first time.
- December 31: All rail service is terminated in Prince Edward Island after CN Rail abandons its historic rail lines in the province.

=== Full date unknown ===
- Corel releases Corel Draw.
- Heather Erxleben becomes Canada's first official female combat soldier.
- Sidney Altman shares in the Nobel Prize for Chemistry.

== Arts and literature ==
=== New works ===
- Mordecai Richler: Solomon Gursky Was Here
- Steve McCaffery: The Black Debt
- Erín Moure: WSW
- Joy Fielding: Good Intentions
- Dave Duncan: West of January
- Tomson Highway: Dry Lips Oughta Move to Kapuskasing
- William Bell: Death Wind
- Farley Mowat: The New Found Land

=== Awards ===
- Books in Canada First Novel Award: Rick Salutin, A Man of Little Faith
- See 1989 Governor General's Awards for a complete list of winners and finalists for those awards.
- Geoffrey Bilson Award: Martyn Godfrey, Mystery in the Frozen Lands, and Dorothy Perkyns, Rachel's Revolution
- Gerald Lampert Award: Sarah Klassen, Journey to Yalta
- Marian Engel Award: Merna Summers
- Pat Lowther Award: Heather Spears, The Word for Sand
- Stephen Leacock Award: John Kertes, Winter Tulips
- Trillium Book Award: Modris Eksteins, Rites of Spring
- Vicky Metcalf Award: Stéphane Poulin

=== Music ===
- Simply Saucer, Cyborgs Revisited
- The Tragically Hip, Up to Here

== Sport ==
- May 13 – The Swift Current Broncos win their only Memorial Cup by defeating the Saskatoon Blades 4 to 3. The final game was played at Saskatchewan Place in Saskatoon, Saskatchewan
- May 25 – The Calgary Flames win their only Stanley Cup by defeating the Montreal Canadiens 4 games to 2. The deciding Game 6 is played at the Montreal Forum. Inverness, Nova Scotia's Al MacInnis is awarded the Conn Smythe Trophy
- June 5 – The Toronto Blue Jays lose the first baseball game played at the SkyDome to the Milwaukee Brewers 3 to 5.
- November 18 – The Western Ontario Mustangs win their fifth Vanier Cup by defeating the Saskatchewan Huskies 35 to 10 in the 25th Grey Cup played at the SkyDome in Toronto.
- November 26 – The Saskatchewan Roughriders win their second (and first since 1966) Grey Cup by defeating the Hamilton Tiger-Cats 43 to 40 in the 77th Grey Cup played at the SkyDome in Toronto.

== Births ==
- January 9 – Nina Dobrev, actress
- January 14 – Karine Thomas, synchronized swimmer
- February 11 – Jesse Rath, actor
- February 13 – Carly McKillip, actress
- February 14 – Emma Miskew, curler
- February 20 – Melanie Leishman, actress
- March 3 – Andrea Brooks, actress
- March 19 – Stephanie Horner, swimmer
- April 5 - Rachel Homan, curler
- April 13 – Mallory Deluce, ice hockey player
- April 19 – Simu Liu, actor
- April 25 – Marie-Michèle Gagnon, skier
- April 28 – Steffi DiDomenicantonio, singer
- May 11 – Alyssa Brown, artistic gymnast
- May 17 – Tessa Virtue, ice dancer
- May 23 – Grace Mahary, model
- June 11 – Keith Aulie, ice hockey player
- June 17 – Brandon Jones, singer
- July 27 – Charlotte Arnold, actress
- July 31 – Marshall Williams, actor
- August 2 – Dominic Jalbert, ice hockey player
- September 12 – Elyse Hopfner-Hibbs, artistic gymnast
- September 23 – Craig Sharpe, singer
- September 25 – Jordan Gavaris, actor
- October 20 – Colin Wilson, Canadian-American ice hockey player
- October 24 – Shenae Grimes, actress
- November 3 – Nav, rapper
- November 5 – Joey Lawrence, photographer
- November 24 – Nicole Sassine, sprinter
- December 2 – Cassie Steele, actress and singer-songwriter
- December 22 – Derek Famulare, Canadian ice hockey player

== Deaths ==
=== January to June ===
- January 20 – Beatrice Lillie, comic actress (b. 1894)
- January 22 – Farquhar Oliver, politician (b. 1904)
- January 31 – William Stephenson, soldier, airman, businessperson, inventor and spymaster (b. 1897)
- February 9
  - Ken Adachi, writer and literary critic (b. 1929)
  - John Duffie, writer (b. 1913)
- May 14 – Joe Primeau, ice hockey player (b. 1906)
- May 14 – E. P. Taylor, business tycoon and race horse breeder (b. 1901)
- June 14 – Louis-Philippe-Antoine Bélanger, politician (b. 1907)
- June 26 – Howard Charles Green, politician and Minister (b. 1895)

=== July to December ===
- July 3 – Peter Fox, politician (b. 1921)
- July 13 – Samuel Boulanger, politician (b. 1909)
- July 24 – Michael Estok, poet
- August 10 – George Ignatieff, diplomat (b. 1913)
- November 11 – Kenneth MacLean Glazier, Sr., minister and librarian (b. 1912)
- September 12 – Elyse Hopfner-Hibbs, gymnast
- November 13 – Victor Davis, swimmer, Olympic gold medalist and World Champion (b. 1964)
- November 15 – George Manuel, Aboriginal leader (b. 1921)
- November 29 – Nancy Bell, senator (b. 1924)
- December 6 – Marc Lépine, murderer responsible for the École Polytechnique massacre (b. 1964)
- December 26 – Doug Harvey, ice hockey player (b. 1924)
- December 26 – Maryon Pearson, wife of Lester B. Pearson, 14th Prime Minister of Canada (b. 1901)

== See also ==
- 1989 in Canadian television
- List of Canadian films of 1989
