= 20th Genie Awards =

2000 Canadian film awards ceremony

- Date: January 30, 2000
- Site: Metro Toronto Convention Centre
- Hosted by: Patrick McKenna

Highlights
- Best Picture: Sunshine
- Most nominations: Sunshine

Television coverage
- Network: CBC Television

The 20th Genie Awards were held on January 30, 2000, by the Academy of Canadian Cinema & Television, to honour films released in 1999. The ceremony aired live on CBC Television, and a post-event highlights show aired on Radio Canada.

Eyebrows were raised when the nominations were dominated by 21 foreign artists; the academy had eliminated an old ruling that prevented foreign talent in minority Canadian co-productions from being eligible for Genie awards. With 152 nominees in total, there was no imbalance, but the fact that the foreign-artist nominations dominated the performance categories bothered many, and raised questions about whether or not the Genies were fulfilling their role of recognizing Canadian achievement and promoting Canadian talent.

This year's awards ceremony, which was hosted by actor Patrick McKenna, was dominated by István Szabó's Sunshine, Atom Egoyan's Felicia's Journey and Jeremy Podeswa's The Five Senses.

== Award winners and nominees ==
| Motion Picture | Direction |
|---|---|
| Sunshine, Andras Hamori and Robert Lantos; eXistenZ, Robert Lantos, David Cronenberg and Andras Hamori; Felicia's Journey, Bruce Davey; The Five Senses, Camelia Frieberg and Jeremy Podeswa; Post Mortem, Lorraine Dufour; Winter Stories (Histoires d'hiver), Claude Gagnon and Yuri Yoshimura Gagnon | Jeremy Podeswa, The Five Senses; Léa Pool, Set Me Free (Emporte-moi); Atom Egoyan, Felicia's Journey; Louis Bélanger, Post Mortem; Istvan Szabo, Sunshine |
| Actor in a leading role | Actress in a leading role |
| Bob Hoskins, Felicia's Journey; Joël Drapeau-Dalpé, Winter Stories (Histoires d'hiver); Denis Bouchard, Winter Stories (Histoires d'hiver); Gabriel Arcand, Post Mortem; Ralph Fiennes, Sunshine; Daniel MacIvor, The Five Senses | Sylvie Moreau, Post Mortem; Elaine Cassidy, Felicia's Journey; Jennifer Ehle, Sunshine; Rosemary Harris, Sunshine; Mary-Louise Parker, The Five Senses |
| Actor in a supporting role | Actress in a supporting role |
| Mark McKinney, Dog Park; Alex Ivanovici, Winter Stories (Histoires d'hiver); Gabriel Arcand, The Big Snake of the World (Le Grand Serpent du monde); James Frain, Sunshine; William Hurt, Sunshine | Catherine O'Hara, The Life Before This; Suzanne Champagne, Winter Stories (Histoires d'hiver); Kathryn Zenna, Jack and Jill; Rachel Weisz, Sunshine; Deborah Kara Unger, Sunshine |
| Original Screenplay | Adapted Screenplay |
| Louis Bélanger, Post Mortem; Bruce McCulloch, Dog Park; Jeremy Podeswa, The Five Senses; Léa Pool, Set Me Free (Emporte-moi); Monique Proulx, The Big Snake of the World (Le Grand Serpent du monde) | Atom Egoyan, Felicia's Journey; François Bouvier and Marc Robitaille, Winter Stories (Histoires d'hiver); Jean-Philippe Duval and Alexis Martin, Matroni and Me (Matroni et moi); Kim Hogan, Heart of the Sun; Wayne Johnston, The Divine Ryans; Monique Proulx and Jean Beaudin, Memories Unlocked (Souvenirs intimes) |
| Best Feature Length Documentary | Best Short Documentary |
| Just Watch Me: Trudeau and the '70s Generation, Gerry Flahive, Catherine Annau and Yves Bisaillon; Quest for the Lost Tribes, Simcha Jacobovici and Elliott Halpern; Tops & Bottoms: Sex, Power and Sadomasochism, Cristine Richey | Hemingway: A Portrait, Bernard Lajoie, Érik Canuel and Tatsuo Shimamura; In Time's Shadow, the Hegis, Rudy Buttignol and David Way |
| Best Live Action Short Drama | Best Animated Short |
| Moving Day, Tina Goldlist and Chris Deacon; Chronique d'un cheval fou, Raymond Gravelle and Michel Juliani; Kuproquo, Marie-Josée Larocque and Jean-François Rivard; Meanwhile (Pendant ce temps...), Robert Lacerte and Ghyslaine Côté; Revisited, Scott Weber | When the Day Breaks, David Verrall, Amanda Forbis and Wendy Tilby; Ludovic: The Snow Gift, Thérèse Descary and Co Hoedeman; The Old Man and the Sea, Bernard Lajoie, Aleksandr Petrov and Tatsuo Shimamura |
| Art Direction/Production Design | Cinematography |
| François Séguin, Memories Unlocked (Souvenirs intimes); John Dondertman and Patricia Cuccia, Boy Meets Girl; Attila Kovács, Sunshine; Taavo Soodor, Darryl Dennis Deegan and Erica Milo, The Five Senses; Carol Spier and Elinor Rose Galbraith, eXistenz | Paul Sarossy, Felicia's Journey; Pierre Gill, Memories Unlocked (Souvenirs intimes); Alwyn Kumst, The Divine Ryans; Gregory Middleton, The Five Senses; Pierre Mignot, Alegría |
| Costume Design | Editing |
| Renée April, Grey Owl; Dominique Lemieux, Alegría; Linda Muir, Jacob Two Two Meets the Hooded Fang; Sandy Powell, Felicia's Journey; Györgyi Szakács, Sunshine | Ronald Sanders, eXistenZ; Alain Baril, Matroni and Me (Matroni et moi); Jean-François Bergeron and Yves Langlois, Alegría; André Corriveau, Winter Stories (Histoires d'hiver); Susan Shanks and Michael Weir, Beefcake |
| Overall Sound | Sound Editing |
| Daniel Pellerin, Keith Elliott, Glen Gauthier and Peter Kelly, Sunshine; Serge Beauchemin, Bernard Gariépy Strobl and Hans Peter Strobl, Memories Unlocked (Souvenirs intimes); Michel Descombes, Jo Caron, Michel Charron and Gavin Fernandes, The Last Breath; Philip Norman Stall, Martin Lee and Lou Solakofski, The Five Senses; Daniel Pellerin, Keith Elliott, Peter Kelly and Brian Simmons, Felicia's Journey | Jane Tattersall, Fred Brennan, Dina Eaton, Andy Malcolm and David McCallum, Sunshine; Louis Dupire, Diane Boucher, Jérôme Décarie, Christian Rivest and Alice Wright, The Last Breath; Alastair Gray, Donna Powell and Clive Turner, The Divine Ryans; Janice Ierulli, Terry Burke, Ed Douglas, Garrett Kerr and Angie Pajek, The Five Senses; Steve Munro, Sue Conley, Andy Malcolm, Tim Roberts and David Drainie Taylor, Felicia's Journey |
| Achievement in Music: Original Score | Achievement in Music: Original Song |
| Mychael Danna, Felicia's Journey; Eric Cadesky and Nick Dyer, Extraordinary Visitor; Jono Grant, Jacob Two Two Meets the Hooded Fang; Maurice Jarre, Sunshine; John Wesley Chisholm, Michael Diabo and John Roby, Beefcake | Glenn Coulson, Marty Beecroft, Joe Heslip and Peter Luciano, "One Thing to Say" (Jacob Two Two Meets the Hooded Fang); Tim Burns, "It's a Treat to be a Creep" (Jacob Two Two Meets the Hooded Fang); Daniel Bélanger, "Le dernier souffle" (The Last Breath}; John Wesley Chisholm, "Beefcake" (Beefcake); Benoit Jutras and René Dupéré, "Alegría" (Alegría) |
| Special awards | |
| Claude Jutra Award: Louis Bélanger, Post Mortem; Golden Reel Award: Les Boys II | |
