= Harry Bush (artist) =

American artist (1926–1994)

- Cover of Hard Boys, 2007
- Born: 11 June 1926
- Died: October 15, 1994 (aged 68); San Juan Capistrano, California
- Known for: Erotic illustration

Harry Bush (11 June 1926–15 October 1994) was an American artist known for his homoerotic illustrations. Bush's highly detailed boy next door-style depictions of men made him one of the most notable artists of the era of beefcake magazines.

== Biography ==
Harry Wayne Bush served in the United States Navy and United States Air Force during the Second World War, and had his first homosexual experience while deployed in the European theatre. He took up illustration as a pastime during the war; he was a self-trained artist who had previously taken only one community college drawing class. Upon the conclusion of the war, Bush worked at the Pentagon until the early 1960s. He retired from military service at the age of 40, and relocated to Los Angeles, California.

In California, Bush's artwork was discovered by Bob Mizer, the founder of the Athletic Model Guild. In January 1966, Mizer published Bush's work for the first time in the beefcake magazine Physique Pictorial, making Bush the second artist after George Quaintance to be featured in the magazine. Works by Bush were additionally published in Mr. Sun, In Touch, Stroke, and Drummer. Bush, along with Lüger and MATT, was one of the last gay visual artists to originate in beefcake magazines; he continued to be published in the openly gay periodicals of the 1970s and 1980s that formed following the erosion of obscenity laws.

Bush was notoriously reclusive, and critical of what he perceived as the superficiality of the gay community. His isolation, combined with fears of copyright infringement, led him to destroy much of his original artwork. Bush remained closeted for the majority of his life due to a persistent fear that he would be outed and subsequently lose his veteran's pension; despite this, he never worked under a pseudonym, and signed all of his art with his own name.

In 1986, Bush was featured in Naked Eyes, an artist showcase organized by Olaf Odegaard that highlighted gay men's visual art for the International Gay and Lesbian Archives.

Bush died in San Juan Capistrano, California in 1994 due to complications from emphysema. An anthology of his surviving works was published posthumously in 2007.

== Style ==
Bush typically drew nudes of boy next door-style males in homoerotic or explicitly sexual scenarios. His works have been noted for their high degree of detail and realism, contrasting the more cartoonish styles of his contemporaries such as Tom of Finland. Bush painted exclusively in oils and watercolors.
