= Andrew Lynch =

Andrew Lynch may refer to:

- Andrew Burchill Lynch (1941–2001), Canadian publisher
- Andrew Lynch (singer-songwriter), American singer-songwriter
- Andrew Lynch (mayor) (died 1523), mayor of Galway
- Andrew Lynch (jockey), Irish jockey
- Andrew Lynch (Australian politician) (1819–1884), New South Wales politician
- Andy Lynch (footballer) (born 1951), from Scotland
- Andy Lynch (musician), from New Zealand band Zed
- Andy Lynch (rugby league) (born 1979), rugby league footballer for Castleford Tigers, Hull FC, Bradford Bulls, England, and Great Britain
- Andrew Henry Lynch, Member of the UK Parliament for Galway Borough
- Drew Lynch (born Andrew Lynch, 1991), American comedian
