= Christos Sirros =

Canadian politician

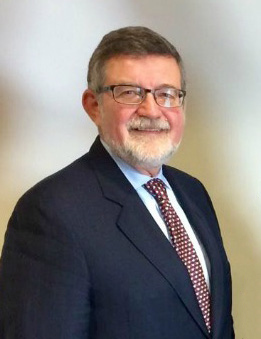
- Sirros in March 2015

Member of the National Assembly of Quebec for Laurier-Dorion
- In office September 12, 1994 – July 17, 2004
- Preceded by: Riding established
- Succeeded by: Elsie Lefebvre

Member of the National Assembly of Quebec for Laurier
- In office April 13, 1981 – September 12, 1994
- Preceded by: André Marchand
- Succeeded by: Riding abolished

Personal details
- Born: 2 February 1948 (age 78) Athens, Attica, Greece
- Party: Quebec Liberal
- Education: McGill University
- Profession: Politician

Christos Sirros (Greek: Χρήστος Σύρρος; born 2 February 1948) is a Canadian politician who served as a member of the National Assembly of Quebec (MNA) for the Laurier-Dorion riding for two decades as a member of the Liberal Party of Quebec.

A graduate from McGill University, he first won the Laurier riding in 1981, defeating Parti Québécois (PQ) candidate Nadia Assimopoulos. The riding of Laurier-Dorion was created for the 1994 election, in which Sirros defeated PQ candidate Benoît Henry by 6,930 votes. He was most notably the minister of Indian affairs under Robert Bourassa and minister of natural resources under Daniel Johnson, Jr. He was the National Assembly's first vice-president from June 2003 to July 2004.

Sirros left his seat in July 2004. He was then appointed Quebec Delegate General for Belgium and held that position until 2013. In December 2014, he was appointed the Quebec Delegate General for the United Kingdom.

== Electoral record ==
2003 Quebec general election: Laurier-Dorion
Party	Candidate	Votes	%	±%
Liberal	Christos Sirros	16,052	53.14	-3.56
Parti Québécois	Tomas Arbieto	9,775	32.36	+0.71
Action démocratique	Mario Spina	1,996	6.61	-0.85
UFP	William Sloan	922	3.05	–
Green	Philippe Morlighem	595	1.97	–
Bloc Pot	Sylvain Mainville	375	1.24	-0.14
Marxist–Leninist	Peter Macrisopoulos	168	0.56	-0.03
No designation	Charles Robidoux	131	0.43	–
No designation	Sylvie Charbin	117	0.38	–
Equality	Yang Zhang	78	0.26	–
Total valid votes		30,209	98.39	–
Total rejected ballots		495	1.61	–
Turnout		30,704	64.36	-11.85
Electors on the lists		47,705	–	–

0.20
1998 Quebec general election: Laurier-Dorion
Party	Candidate	Votes	%	±%
Liberal	Christos Sirros	19,471	56.70	+1.17
Parti Québécois	Robert Loranger	10,868	31.65	−3.11
Action démocratique	Fernand Bélisle	2,561	7.46	+2.29
Socialist Democracy	Milan Mirich	490	1.43	
Bloc Pot	Marc-André Gagnon	474	1.38	
Marxist–Leninist	Panagiotis Macrisopoulos	203	0.59	+0.22
Communist	John Manolis	159	0.46	−0.16
Independent	Mostafa Ben Kirane	113	0.33	
Total valid votes		34,339	100.00	
Rejected and declined votes		560		
Turnout		34,899	76.21	−5.44
Electors on the lists		45,792		
Source: Official Results, Le Directeur général des élections du Québec.

1994 Quebec general election: Laurier-Dorion
Party	Candidate	Votes	%
Liberal	Christos Sirros	18,522	55.53
Parti Québécois	Benoit Henry	11,592	34.76
Action démocratique	Fernand Bélisle	1,723	5.17
New Democratic	Milan Mirich	409	1.23
Commonwealth of Canada	Christian Chouery	329	0.99
Natural Law	André Fleurant	274	0.82
Communist	Panayiote Georgopoulos	206	0.62
Développement Québec	Pierre-Paul Laurence	172	0.52
Marxist–Leninist	Panagiotis Macrisopoulos	125	0.37
Total valid votes		33,352	100.00
Rejected and declined votes		712	
Turnout		34,064	81.65
Electors on the lists		41,718	
Source: Official Results, Le Directeur général des élections du Québec.

1989 Quebec general election: Laurier
Party	Candidate	Votes	%
Liberal	Christos Sirros	11,027	54.98
Parti Québécois	Elpis Santas	5,656	28.20
Green	Nathalie Sapina	1,170	5.83
New Democratic	Victor Bilodeau	777	3.87
Marxist–Leninist	Panagiotis Macrisopoulos	382	1.90
Independent	Jacques Dubuc	349	1.74
Non-affiliated	Nicholas Vlahos	299	1.49
Communist	Suzanne Dagenais	174	0.87
Socialist Movement	Jean-Roch Gauvin	148	0.74
Revolutionary Workers League	Michel Dugré	73	0.36
Total valid votes		20,055	100.00
Rejected and declined votes		519	
Turnout		20,574	67.24
Electors on the lists		30,599	
Source: Official Results, Le Directeur général des élections du Québec.

1985 Quebec general election: Laurier
Party	Candidate	Votes	%
Liberal	Christos Sirros	16,004	65.80
Parti Québécois	Ivano Vellano	5,966	24.47
New Democratic	Ioannis Kourtesis	830	3.41
Parti indépendantiste	Christian Biron	425	1.74
Progressive Conservative	Irene Makris	393	1.61
Humanist	Gustavo Jara	232	0.95
Independent	Christopher Mcall	174	0.71
Communist	Samuel Walsh	172	0.71
Commonwealth of Canada	Benoit Chalifoux	146	0.60
Total valid votes		24,382	97.86
Rejected and declined votes		533	2.14
Turnout		24,915	68.86
Electors on the lists		36,128	
Source: Official Results, Le Directeur général des élections du Québec.

1981 Quebec general election: Laurier
Party	Candidate	Votes	%	±%
Liberal	Christos Sirros	16,719	57.99	
Parti Québécois	Nadia Assimopoulos	9,871	34.24	
Union Nationale	Michel PontBriand	675	2.34	
Workers Communist	Raymonde Lebreux	469	1.63	
Independent	Basile Papachristou	263	0.91	
Freedom of Choice	Stephen J Smith	252	0.88	
Libertarian	Nicholas Vlahos	202	0.70	
Marxist–Leninist	Panagiotis Macrisopoulos	164	0.57	
Communist	Nikolas Tsois	142	0.49	
Independent	Sotirios Athanasiou	73	0.25	
Total valid votes		28,830	98.67	
Rejected and declined votes		389	1.33	
Turnout		29,219	80.21	
Electors on the lists		36,428		
Source: Official Results, Le Directeur général des élections du Québec.
