= The Racoons =

Canadian rock band

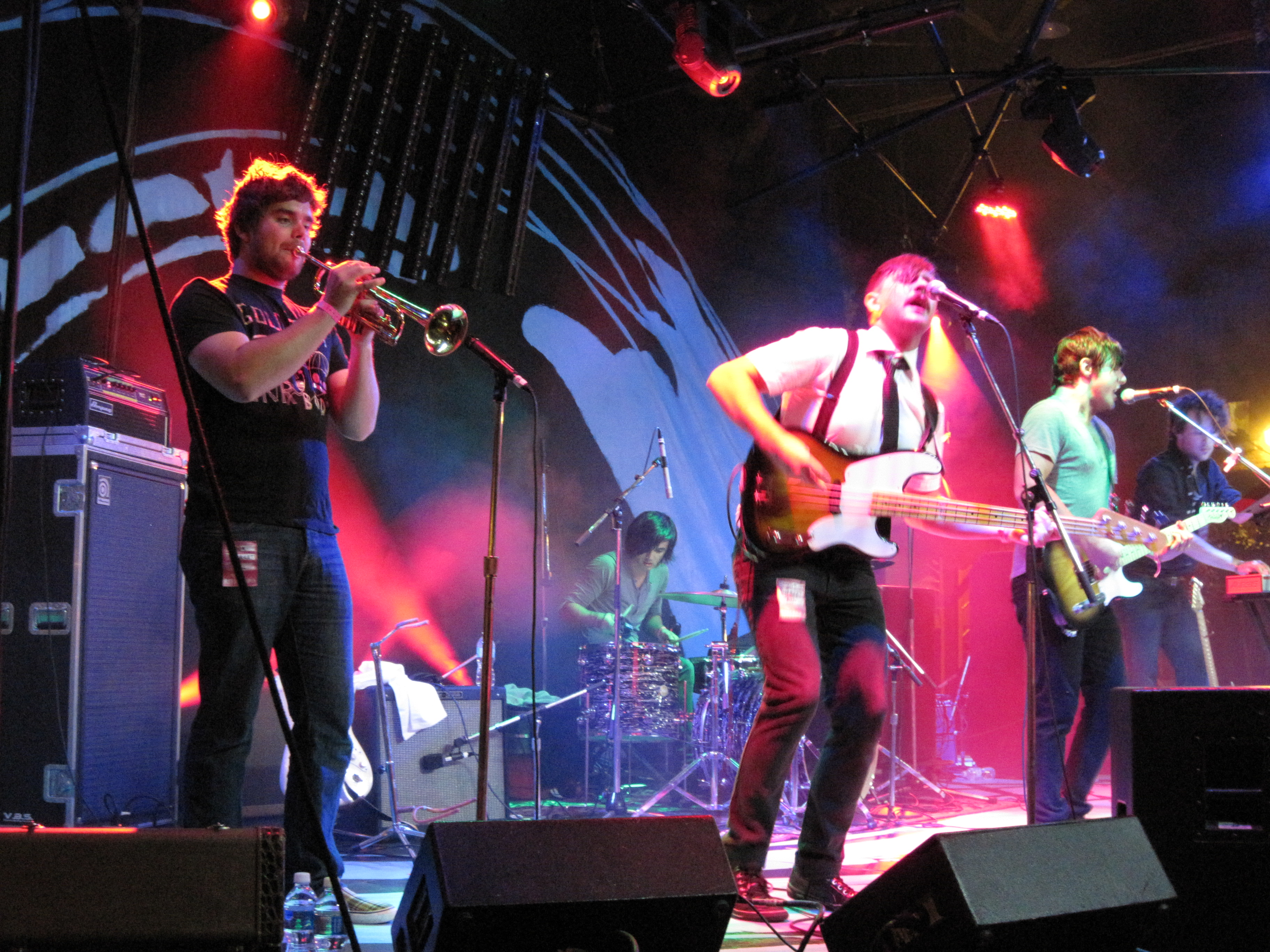

Background information
- Origin: Victoria, British Columbia, Canada
- Genres: Indie rock, new wave, post-punk
- Labels: Indie
- Members: Matthew Lyall; Murray Mckenzie; Jeffrey Mitchelmore; James Alexander Bodman; Douglas Hamilton-Evans
- Website: theracoons.com

Racoons are an indie rock band from Victoria, British Columbia.

== History ==
Racoons were formed in 2008 by founding members Matthew Lyall and Murray Mckenzie. The duo were then joined by Jeff Mitchelmore and James Alexander Bodman, former members of indie pop band The Paper Cranes. The band's debut EP Islomania was released internationally through Maple Music in May 2009. In June 2009, the band embarked on a national tour with The Von Bondies across Canada as well as playing the Rifflandia, Sled Island, Olio, Deraylor, and Big Time Out festivals. Over the summer of 2009, the band relocated to Vancouver where they are currently working on their debut full-length. The band are co-managed by Nick Blasko (Tegan and Sara, Buck 65) and Coral Osborne (The Blue Violets).

== Band members ==
- Matthew Lyall – Vocals, Guitar
- Murray Mckenzie – Guitar, Keyboards
- Jeffrey Mitchelmore – Percussion
- Douglas Hamilton-Evans – Trumpet

== Discography ==
=== Albums ===
- Islomania (2009) – Available on Maple Music

=== Singles ===
- "Be My Television" (Islomania 2009)
- "Tangiers" (Islomania 2009)

== Awards ==
- Most Promising Band 2009 (won) Monday Magazine
- Best New Artist 2009 (currently nominated) CBC Radio 3
- Band of the Month January 2009 (won) The Zone
- Favourite Album of 2009 (runner-up) Monday Magazine
- Favourite Band 2010 (won) Monday Magazine

== Radio and television ==
In September 2009, the song "Room To Operate" was featured in an episode of The Hills.

Singles "Be My Television" and "Tangiers" have received extensive national radio play on CBC Radio 3.

Racoons' performance at Rifflandia/Transmission on 24 September 2009, was broadcast live on Sirius Satellite Radio.

In February 2010, the song "Be My Television" was featured in an episode of 16 and Pregnant.
