= Beefcake (disambiguation) =

Beefcake is a body shape depicting a large and muscular male body.

Beefcake may also refer to:

- Beefcake magazines, featuring photographs of attractive, muscular young men in athletic poses
- Beefcake (film), a 1999 comedy film

== See also ==
- Beefcake the Mighty, the bassist of the band GWAR
- Brutus Beefcake (Edward Leslie), professional wrestler
