= MATT =

American cartoonist Charles Edward Kerbs (1940–2002)

- Born: Charles Edward Kerbs; August 8, 1940; New Orleans, Louisiana
- Died: March 4, 2002 (aged 61); New Orleans, Louisiana
- Known for: Erotic drawing
- Partner: Jeffrey Johnson

Signature
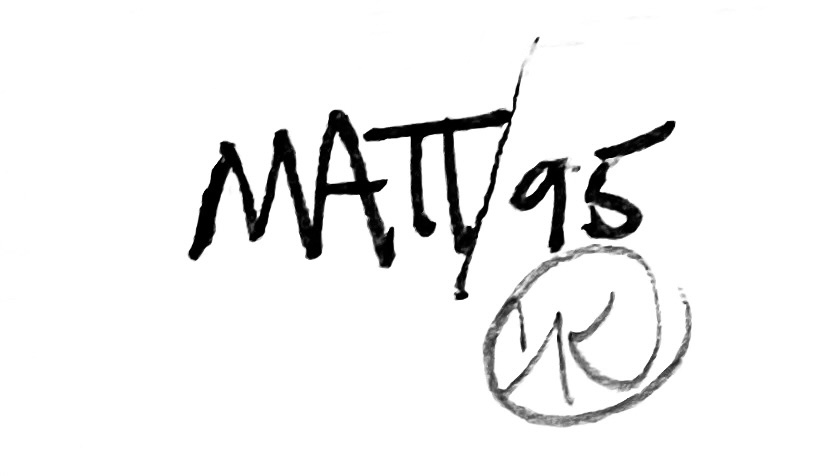

Charles Edward Kerbs (August 8, 1940 – March 4, 2002), better known by his pen name MATT, was an American artist, actor, and playwright active in the late twentieth century, known for his erotic illustrations.

== Biography ==
Kerbs was born on August 8, 1940, in New Orleans, Louisiana. He began working professionally while still in high school, painting a mural in the cafeteria of Easton High School, from which he graduated in 1959.

As a teenager, Kerbs found a liking and talent for drawing the male form, especially wrestlers, cowboys, leathermen, and servicemen. He was an avid reader of the beefcake magazine Physique Pictorial and drew inspiration from gay artists such as Tom of Finland, Harry Bush, and Art Bob. His drawings were first published in Grecian Guild Pictorial when Kerbs was 16 years old.

In the 1960s, Kerbs submitted his portfolio to Bob Mizer, who loved Kerbs' work and published it in Athletic Model Guild. According to Bill Schmeling, Mizer suggested Kerbs adopt the pen name MATT because of his talent for depicting "men-on-the-mats." Kerbs' erotic drawings were massively successful, appearing in every issue of Honcho magazine as well as other major leather, S&M, and fetish publications such as Drummer.

Kerbs had a passion for live theater. In 1964 he conducted an acting workshop for Free Southern Theater. In 1965 he played the lead role of Finch in a production of How to Succeed in Business Without Really Trying by Gallery Circle Theatre. After the show closed, he moved to Manhattan in New York City to pursue a career as an actor and playwright. He wrote several plays, including Phaedra and The Sleeping Gypsy, both of which premiered at Caffe Cino in 1967. He received acting lessons from Nola Chilton, who is credited as an important influence on his artistic development. During that time, he supported himself by designing fabrics and wallpaper patterns (with additional financial assistance from his mother, Rose). In 1970, he and his friend Lyla Hay Owen formed their own theater, the People Playhouse, which produced several of Kerbs' plays. Around this time he moved back to New Orleans.

Cover of Rasslers, 'Ranglers & Rough Guys: The Erotic Art of Matt

In the 1970s Kerbs' art was exhibited at the Galley House in New Orleans, followed by Stompers Gallery and the Leslie-Lohman Museum of Art in New York. During the 1970s Kerbs also worked for D.H. Holmes, designing an art nouveau mural for the company's Bourbon Street restaurant as well as elaborate holiday displays. He also created costumes and posters for gay Mardi Gras krewes, some of which were acquired by the Louisiana State Museum.

In the 1980s and 1990s, Kerbs continued to contribute to gay publications, including FirstHand: Experiences for Loving Men and Alternate: the International magazine of sexual politics. In 1986, Kerbs was featured in Naked Eyes, an artist showcase organized by Olaf Odegaard that highlighted gay men's visual art for the International Gay and Lesbian Archives. He was featured at the Tom of Finland Foundation's Erotic Art Fair in 1995 and 1996. In his last years, he began self-publishing some of his art and adult comic books.

Kerbs was diagnosed with heart problems sometime in the 1970s. He died of pneumonia on March 4, 2002, while hospitalized for heart bypass surgery. Kerbs was survived by his partner of 18 years, Jeff Johnson, who committed to continue making Kerbs' art available to his admirers.

== Plays ==
- About the Dirty Old Man
- Midgets From Uranus
- Phaedra
- Sexy Music Again
- The Sleeping Gypsy
- The Wicked Stage

== Cultural impact and legacy ==
In 1997, Brush Creek Media published an 80-page collection of his art titled 'Rasslers, 'ranglers & Rough Guys: The Erotic Art of Matt. In a forward, Honcho editor-in-chief Doug McClemont wrote, "His works, almost all classics of the genre, have become a collective time capsule of gay fantasy life."

In a tribute published by the Tom of Finland Foundation in 2002, Bill Schmeling described Kerbs as "the all time great erotic 'Wrestling Artist'" and wrote, "Charles Kerbs was a gentle giant, a quiet, unassuming powerhouse of creative genius and energy. The man may have left us, but his spirit lives on in MATT."

The Leather Archives & Museum and Tom of Finland Foundation include some of Kerbs' art in their permanent collections.

== See also ==
- Leather Archives & Museum
