= Truger =

Truger is a German-language surname. Notable people with the surname include:

- Achim Truger (born 1969), German economist
- Celia Truger, bisrth name of Nola Chilton, American-born Israeli theater director and acting teacher
- Ulrike Truger (born 1948), Austrian sculptor
