= The Paper Cranes =

Canadian musical group

- Origin: Victoria, British Columbia, Canada
- Genre: Indie pop
- Label: Unfamiliar Records
- Members: Ryan McCullagh; Miranda McCullagh
- Past members: James Watson; Mark Vondrasek; John Quissy; Mark Lavoie; Evan Middleton; Dale Peltier; Braeden Paterson; Jeff Mitchelmore; Alex Bodman
- Website: The Paper Cranes

The Paper Cranes are a Canadian indie pop band from Victoria, British Columbia. The band is composed of the husband and wife duo of Ryan McCullagh (Guitar, Bass, Vocals) and Miranda McCullagh (Keyboard, Drum Sequencing). Despite several line-up changes during their career the group remains centered on the husband-wife team. The band take their name from the book, Sadako and the Thousand Paper Cranes by Eleanor Coerr.

== History ==
The band was formed in January 2005 by multi-instrumentalist Ryan McCullagh (vocals, guitar, keyboard), James Watson (drums), John Quissy (bass), and Mark Vondrasek (guitar). The group recorded 5 demo songs together including early versions of "I'll Love You Until My Veins Explode", "Out On The Horse Tracks", and "Deus Ex Machinegun" which circulated on the internet though the recordings were never officially released.

In the summer of 2005, Greg Ipp, a Toronto DJ and music blogger, founded Unfamiliar Records and signed The Paper Cranes. In the autumn of that year, Miranda Roach joined the group as their keyboard player. Following some opening slots for Wolf Parade and Pretty Girls Make Graves the band recorded their untitled debut EP usually referred to as the Veins EP. The album was recorded at Mushroom Studios in Vancouver, British Columbia, and was engineered and produced by Howard Redekopp. In December 2005, Ryan and Miranda were married.

The Veins EP was released on Unfamiliar Records as the label's first release in the spring of 2006. The single, "I'll Love You Until My Veins Explode" was given a 4 star rating by Pitchfork. Shortly after, Mark Vondrasek left the band and a few months later, following the band's first Canadian tour James Watson and John Quissy both left as well to finish their degrees at the University of Victoria.

In 2007, The Paper Cranes recruited Braeden Paterson (guitar), Mark Lavoie (bass), and Evan Middleton (drums) to record their first full-length album, Halcyon Days. The album was recorded at The Hive Studio in Burnaby, British Columbia, by Jessie Gander over 3 days. Most of the album was recorded live from the studio floor. Shortly after the recording of Halcyon Days, "I'll Love You Until My Veins Explode" and "Milkrun" from the Veins EP were released in the UK as the double-A side single, "I'll Love You Until My Veins Explode/Milkrun" on the Longest Mile label, owned in part by Ross Millard of The Futureheads. Halcyon Days was released in February 2008 on Unfamiliar Records.

After the release of Halcyon Days Evan Middleton left the band. Mark Lavoie continued to perform with The Paper Cranes but subsequently left to tour with fellow Victoria musicians, Maurice.

James Alexander Bodman and Jeffrey Mitchelmore of the Victoria indie-rock band, The Racoons joined the group in 2008 and both can be heard on The Paper Cranes' 2009 online-only single, "Telephone."

In August 2009, The Paper Cranes released their second full-length album, Chivalry's Dead on Unfamiliar Records. The album was recorded over 2 months in the Spring of 2009 at Mankind Studio in Victoria, British Columbia. Grand Piano on the album was recorded at The Victoria Conservatory of Music.

Shortly after the release of Chivalry's Dead, citing scheduling conflicts with the supporting band's other musical projects, The Paper Cranes' core members Miranda Roach and Ryan McCullagh restructured the band as a duet utilizing drum loops and electronic instruments to take the place of live back-up musicians.

In the fall of 2008, "Rabbit in a Snare" from the band's Veins EP was featured in a Canadian television commercial for the Nissan Rogue and in 2009 The Paper Cranes were voted Victoria's Favorite Band at the 2009 Monday Magazine M Awards.

In 2009, "Rabbit in a Snare" from the Veins EP (2006) was featured in the documentary Don't You Forget About Me by Alliance films outlining the life and work of screenwriter, director, and producer John Hughes.

Their music has been playlisted on CBC Radio 3.

== Discography ==
=== Albums ===
- Halcyon Days (2008)
- Chivalry's Dead (2009)

=== Extended plays ===
- Veins (2006)

=== Singles ===
- "I'll Love You Until My Veins Explode" / "Milkrun" (2007)
- "Telephone" (2009)

== Awards ==
=== M Awards ===
Monday Magazine's M Awards are awarded for Victoria’s visual, literary and performing artists. The Paper Cranes have won two awards.

Year	Nominee / work	Award	Result
2009	The Paper Cranes	Favourite Band	Won
2009	Halcyon Days	Favourite album of 2008	Nominated
2007	The Paper Cranes	Most Promising Band	Won
2007	The Paper Cranes	Victoria's Next Big Thing	Won
