= André Marchand (politician) =

Canadian politician

André Marchand (26 May 1926 – 11 January 2011) was a politician of the Quebec Liberal Party. He was a member of the National Assembly representing the Laurier riding from 1970 to 1981, having defeated the former Liberal René Lévesque in the 1970 election), and was re-elected for the 29th, 30th and 31st National Assembly of Quebec.

== Electoral record ==
1976 Quebec general election: Laurier
Party	Candidate	Votes	%
Liberal	André Marchand	11,858	41.68
Parti Québécois	John Kambites	9,583	33.69
Union Nationale	Georges Savoidakis	4,962	17.44
Democratic Alliance	Christos Syros	921	3.24
Ralliement créditiste	Denise Chartrand Marion	678	2.38
Communist	Madame Joseph Mallaroni	240	0.84
coalition: NPDQ - RMS	Pierre Bastien	206	0.72
Total valid votes		28,448	100.00
Rejected and declined votes		840	
Turnout		29,288	82.79
Electors on the lists		35,377	
Source: Official Results, Le Directeur général des élections du Québec.

National Assembly of Quebec
Preceded by René Lévesque (Liberal, later Parti Québécois)	MNA for District of Laurier; 1970-1981	Succeeded by Christos Sirros (Liberal)
