= Chronique d'un cheval fou =

1999 Canadian short film

- Directed by: Michel Juliani
- Produced by: Raymond Gravelle
- Starring: Nathalie Breuer; Luc Durand; Jean-François Pichette
- Music by: Jean Beaudet
- Production companies: Productions Lagauchet, inc.
- Release date: 2 November 1999 (Abitibi-Témiscamingue International Film Festival)
- Running time: 22 minutes
- Country: Canada
- Language: French

Chronique d'un cheval fou is a 1999 Canadian short drama film directed by Michel Juliani, produced by Raymond Gravelle, and starring Luc Durand, Nathalie Breuer, and Jean-François Pichette, with a score by Jean Beaudet, about a couple whose strained relationship is put to the test when one of them interviews the other live on the radio.

Un film d'atmosphère, trouble, entre la fiction et la réalité.

— Franchie Grimaldi

== Synopsis ==
A radio host interviews her author husband live on the air. Over the course of their professional dialogue, the couple's relationship goes through a subtle deterioration. By the end of the allotted half hour, the relationship is over.

== Cast ==
- Nathalie Breuer
- Luc Durand
- Jean-François Pichette

This was Jean-François Pichette's first film since Le lac de la Lune (1994) directed by Michel Jetté.

== Production ==
=== Filming ===
Principal photography for Chronique d'un cheval fou took place in Montréal the week of 16 October 1998.

=== Music ===
In 1999, director Michel Juliani approached Martine Carrière to be the solo vocalist accompanying the piano played by composer Jean Beaudet.

== Release and reception ==
Chronique d'un cheval fou had its world premiere at the 18th Abitibi-Témiscamingue International Film Festival, in Rouyn-Noranda on 2 November 1999, presented by Juliani and Pichette.

The film achieved a wider theatrical release in 2001 as the short accompanying Abdelkrim Bahloul's La Nuit du destin.

=== Accolade ===
The short was nominated for Best Live Action Short Drama at the 20th Genie Awards (2000) but lost to Moving Day.
