= Winter Stories =

Winter Stories may refer to:

- Winter Stories (film), a 1999 Canadian sports drama film
- Winter Stories (Judy Collins, Jonas Fjeld and Chatham County Line album), 2019
- Winter Stories (Brian Culbertson album), 2019
