= Prix René-Lévesque =

Award

The Prix René-Lévesque is an award by the Government of Quebec which is part of the Prix du Québec, given to individuals for an outstanding career in journalism. It was first awarded in 2023. It is named in honour of René Lévesque, who had a distinguished career in journalism prior to entering politics.

A different, unrelated Prix René-Lévesque was presented by the Association des journalistes indépendants du Québec in the 1990s.

== Winners ==
- 2023 - Pierre Bruneau
- 2024 - Aline Desjardins
- 2025 - Céline Galipeau
