= Marc Robitaille (screenwriter) =

Canadian screenwriter, novelist and sportswriter

Marc Robitaille is a Canadian screenwriter, novelist and sportswriter. He is most noted for his work on the films Winter Stories (Histoires d'hiver), for which he and François Bouvier received a Genie Award nomination for Best Adapted Screenplay at the 20th Genie Awards and a Jutra Award nomination for Best Screenplay at the 2nd Jutra Awards, and The Vinland Club (Le Club Vinland), for which he was a Prix Iris nominee for Best Screenplay at the 22nd Quebec Cinema Awards.

Winter Stories was an adaptation of Robitaille's own novel Des histoires d'hiver, avec des rues, des écoles et du hockey. His second novel, Un été sans point ni coup sûr, was subsequently adapted into the film A No-Hit No-Run Summer.

Robitaille has also written several non-fiction books on the history of the Montreal Expos and the Montreal Canadiens, including Une enfance bleu-blanc-rouge (2000), Une vue du champ gauche (2003), Il était une fois les Expos, Tome 1 : Les années 1969-1984 (2009) and Il était une fois les Expos, Tome 2 : Les années 1985-2004 (2011).
