= Charles Lynch (journalist) =

Canadian journalist and writer (1919–1994)

Charles Burchill Lynch
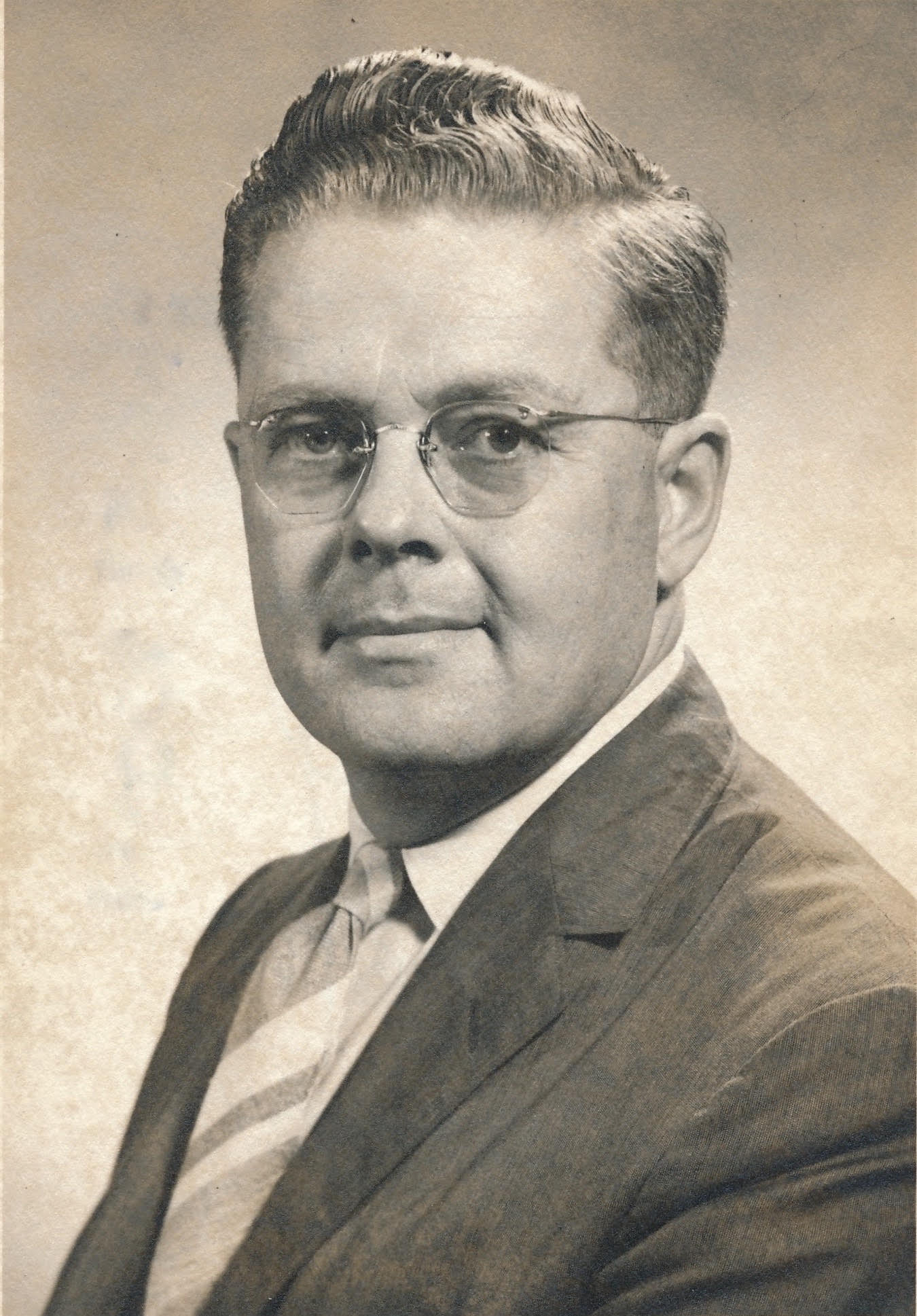
- Born: Charles Burchill Lynch; 3 December 1919; Cambridge, Massachusetts, United States
- Died: 21 July 1994 (aged 74); Ottawa, Ontario, Canada
- Occupations: Journalist and Author
- Writing career
- Genre: Non-fiction
- Subject: Politics

Charles Burchill Lynch, OC (3 December 1919 – 21 July 1994) was a Canadian journalist and author.

== Biography ==
Born in Cambridge, Massachusetts, to Canadian parents, he moved with his family to Saint John, New Brunswick when he was two weeks old. In 1936, he started his career in journalism with the Saint John Citizen and then moved on to the Halifax Herald, followed by the Canadian Press in Halifax, Nova Scotia.

Lynch was appointed Vancouver bureau chief of the British United Press in 1940. The following year, he was transferred to Toronto to assume the position of divisional manager.

== Reuters years ==
In 1943, Lynch joined Reuters News Agency as a World War II correspondent. He was one of nine Canadian reporters to accompany troops ashore on D-Day, landing with them at Juno Beach. Others included veteran correspondent Matthew Halton of the CBC, Ross Munro and William Stewart of the Canadian Press, Ralph Allen of The Globe and Mail and Marcel Ouimet for Radio-Canada, the CBC's French-language service.

Lynch's presence on Juno Beach is featured in Cornelius Ryan's 1959 book The Longest Day. When homing pigeons used by the correspondents flew towards the German lines, Lynch is quoted in the book as having screamed at the pigeons that they were "Traitors! Damn traitors!". In the 1962 hit film based on Ryan's book, a fictionalized portrayal of Lynch's pigeon accusation is shown taking place on Sword Beach, by a British correspondent.

Following the War, Lynch covered the first four months of the Nuremberg War Crimes Trials for Reuters.

He then moved with his family to Rio de Janeiro, Brazil to become Reuters' chief South American correspondent. Following this, he became the news agency's chief Canadian correspondent and, finally, New York City Editor before leaving Reuters in 1956 to become the CBC's United Nations correspondent.

== Southam years ==
Lynch moved back to Canada in 1958 to assume the role of Ottawa Bureau Chief of Southam News. Lynch thrived as a journalist in Ottawa and by 1960 he was Chief of Southam. On 3 January 1963, at a press conference in Ottawa, Lynch asked the retiring NATO supreme commander in Europe a question about Canada's nuclear weapons policy that would help bring the downfall of the government of Prime Minister John Diefenbaker: "Does it mean, sir, that if Canada does not accept nuclear weapons for these aeroplanes [Canada's Starfighter jets in Europe] that she is not actually fulfilling her NATO commitments?" General Lauris Norstad's affirmative answer, and Diefenbaker's subsequent statements in response would eventually lead to the Progressive Conservative Party's loss in the April elections.

During his time with Southam, Lynch made a historic two-month trip to Communist China in April and May 1965. As a working journalist, Lynch sent home dispatches vividly describing his impressions of the country's politics and people under Chairman Mao Zedong. Lynch's uncensored dispatches appeared in Southam papers after making the voyage home by airmail. The trip is notable because it was sanctioned by the Chinese government — almost unheard of for a journalist at the time, and the fact that it chronicles life in China from a Western perspective less than a year before the start of the Cultural Revolution. Lynch's dispatches were ultimately edited and compiled into what became the journalist's first book: China, One Fourth of the World, which became a Canadian best-seller. The book is now out of print.

In his role as Southam News Chief, Lynch frequently worked with CBC television as a political expert. From 1970 to 1974, while still acting as Southam News Chief, Lynch co-hosted the CBC television program Encounter. The show was CBC's venue for questioning Canada's major political figures, including Prime Minister Pierre Trudeau, former Prime Minister Lester Pearson, Alberta Premier Peter Lougheed, and former NDP leader Tommy Douglas. Lynch's co-host was CBC parliamentary reporter Ron Collister and the third guest host. Lynch and Collister were replaced in 1974 by Doug Collins and Elizabeth Gray.

== Awards ==
In 1977, Lynch was made an Officer of the Order of Canada as an acknowledgment of "the vitality, insight and integrity he has shown during his forty years of reporting the news." In 1981 he was inducted into the Canadian News Hall of Fame. He was awarded an honorary doctorate of laws from Mount Allison University.

In 1993, the National Press Club established the Charles Lynch Award in his honour for recognition of a Canadian journalist's outstanding coverage of national issues. However, the award was not given out until 1997, when CBC Newsworld's Don Newman was the first recipient. The award continues to be given out annually after that year.

== Retirement ==
In 1984, he retired and became a freelance writer. During the Meech Lake Accord debate of the late 1980s, he faced criticism for writing in his weekly column that Newfoundland should be expelled from Confederation for its opposition to the accord, as it was a more expendable province than Quebec. The comment led to the emergence of political satirist Rick Mercer, who first emerged in 1990 with the stage show Show Me the Button, I'll Push It, or Charles Lynch Must Die.

Lynch was the father of Andrew Lynch, a notable publisher and journalist in the city of Victoria, British Columbia.

== Selected bibliography ==
- China, One Fourth of the World (1965)
- You Can't Print That! (1983, ISBN 0-88830-245-2)
- Our Retiring Prime Minister (1983, ISBN 0-7704-1827-9)
- Race for the Rose: Election 1984 (1984, ISBN 0-458-98460-4)
- A Funny Way to Run a Country: Further Memoirs of a Political Voyeur (1988, ISBN 0-88830-294-0)
- The Lynch Mob: Stringing Up Our Prime Ministers (1988, ISBN 1-55013-108-7)
- Up from the Ashes: The Rideau Club Story (1990, ISBN 0-7766-0310-8)
- Fishing With Simon (1991, ISBN 0-13-318809-4)
