= Annabel Soutar =

Canadian playwright (born 1971)

Annabel Soutar (born 1971) is a Canadian playwright who specializes in documentary theater.

== Biography ==
Annabel Soutar was born in Westmount, Quebec, to Ian Alexander Soutar, an investment banker and philanthropist, and Helgi Soutar. She has two siblings, James Soutar and Adam Soutar.

She graduated with an A.B. in English from Princeton University in 1994 after completing an 174-page-long senior thesis, titled "Of Beauty Born - A Journal of the Creative Process", under the supervision of Michael Cadden. At Princeton, she studied English and theatre and discovered the early documentary plays of Anna Deavere Smith, whose plays influenced her to create drama which focuses primarily on social action and critique.

In 1998, Soutar and her husband, actor Alex Ivanovici, began work on the play Novembre by interviewing people about the 1998 provincial election in Quebec. Lacking an official title for this endeavor, Soutar and Ivanovici came up with the name "Porte Parole" (French for 'spokesperson') which has since become an award-winning Montreal company. Soutar is still the artistic director of Projet Porte Parole and is focused on producing theater of immediate social relevance.

Soutar's work explores contemporary issues such as the high-tech industry (2000 Questions, 2002), the health care system in Quebec (Sante, 2002), and the 2006 collapse of the De la Concorde overpass in Montreal that left five people dead (Sexy Béton (which translates to English as 'Sexy concrete'), 2009). Soutar gained national acclaim for her play Seeds, a re-enactment of the legal battle between Percy Schmeiser and Monsanto Inc, which was called "one of the most important new works to appear on the Canadian stage in recent times." Most recently, her play The Watershed was commissioned to appear as part of the cultural events associated with the 2015 Pan American Games.

Soutar's work is notable both for its exploration of contemporary issues and for its inclusion of herself, her friends, and her family as characters. In The Watershed, for instance, Soutar, played by Kristen Thomson, leads her family (portrayed by other actors) on a cross-country journey in an effort to understand why a federal omnibus bill eliminated funding for the Experimental Lakes Area. Her children are played by other actors while her husband, actor Alex Ivanovici, plays himself. Her theatrical style incorporates elements of both epic theater and naturalism and her scripts are compiled by recreating dialogue from published transcripts or personal interviews.

Soutar has had two daughters with Ivanovici, Beatrice and Ella.

== Awards and honours ==
Soutar has been nominated for several awards by the Soirée des Masques de l'Académie québécoise ("Prix de la Revelation" 2001), Académie québécois du théâtre (Best New Text, Best English Production, 2006), and Le Prix Michel Tremblay (2009).

== Bibliography ==
- Soutar, Annabel, Seeds. Talonbooks, Vancouver, British Columbia. 2012.
- Soutar, Annabel, The Watershed. Talonbooks, Vancouver, British Columbia. 2015.
