= Laurier (provincial electoral district) =

Coordinates: 45°31′38″N 73°37′26″W

Quebec electoral district

Defunct provincial electoral district
- Legislature: National Assembly of Quebec
- District created: 1965
- District abolished: 1992
- First contested: 1966
- Last contested: 1989

Demographics
- Census division(s): Montreal (part)
- Census subdivision(s): Montreal (part)

Laurier was a former provincial electoral district in the Montreal region of the province of Quebec, Canada. It corresponded to the Parc-Extension neighbourhood in Montreal.

It was created for the 1966 election from parts of Laval, Montréal-Laurier, and Montréal-Outremont electoral districts. Its final election was in 1989. It disappeared in the 1994 election and its successor electoral district was Laurier-Dorion.

It was named in honour of former Canadian Prime Minister Wilfrid Laurier.

== Members of the Legislative Assembly / National Assembly ==
Legislature	Years	Member	Party
Riding created from Laval, Montréal-Laurier, and Montréal-Outremont
28th	1966–1967	René Lévesque	Liberal
28th	1967–1970	René Lévesque	Independent
29th	1970–1973	André Marchand	Liberal
30th	1973–1976	André Marchand	Liberal
31st	1976–1981	André Marchand	Liberal
32nd	1981–1985	Christos Sirros	Liberal
33rd	1985–1989	Christos Sirros	Liberal
34th	1989–1994	Christos Sirros	Liberal
Dissolved into Laurier-Dorion

== Election results ==
1989 Quebec general election
Party	Candidate	Votes	%
Liberal	Christos Sirros	11,027	54.98
Parti Québécois	Elpis Santas	5,656	28.20
Green	Nathalie Sapina	1,170	5.83
New Democratic	Victor Bilodeau	777	3.87
Marxist–Leninist	Panagiotis Macrisopoulos	382	1.90
Independent	Jacques Dubuc	349	1.74
Non-affiliated	Nicholas Vlahos	299	1.49
Communist	Suzanne Dagenais	174	0.87
Socialist Movement	Jean-Roch Gauvin	148	0.74
Revolutionary Workers League	Michel Dugré	73	0.36
Total valid votes		20,055	100.00
Rejected and declined votes		519	
Turnout		20,574	67.24
Electors on the lists		30,599	
Source: Official Results, Le Directeur général des élections du Québec.

1985 Quebec general election
Party	Candidate	Votes	%
Liberal	Christos Sirros	16,004	65.80
Parti Québécois	Ivano Vellano	5,966	24.47
New Democratic	Ioannis Kourtesis	830	3.41
Parti indépendantiste	Christian Biron	425	1.74
Progressive Conservative	Irene Makris	393	1.61
Humanist	Gustavo Jara	232	0.95
Independent	Christopher Mcall	174	0.71
Communist	Samuel Walsh	172	0.71
Commonwealth of Canada	Benoit Chalifoux	146	0.60
Total valid votes		24,382	97.86
Rejected and declined votes		533	2.14
Turnout		24,915	68.86
Electors on the lists		36,128	
Source: Official Results, Le Directeur général des élections du Québec.

1981 Quebec general election
Party	Candidate	Votes	%	±%
Liberal	Christos Sirros	16,719	57.99	
Parti Québécois	Nadia Assimopoulos	9,871	34.24	
Union Nationale	Michel PontBriand	675	2.34	
Workers Communist	Raymonde Lebreux	469	1.63	
Independent	Basile Papachristou	263	0.91	
Freedom of Choice	Stephen J Smith	252	0.88	
Libertarian	Nicholas Vlahos	202	0.70	
Marxist–Leninist	Panagiotis Macrisopoulos	164	0.57	
Communist	Nikolas Tsois	142	0.49	
Independent	Sotirios Athanasiou	73	0.25	
Total valid votes		28,830	98.67	
Rejected and declined votes		389	1.33	
Turnout		29,219	80.21	
Electors on the lists		36,428		
Source: Official Results, Le Directeur général des élections du Québec.

1976 Quebec general election
Party	Candidate	Votes	%
Liberal	André Marchand	11,858	41.68
Parti Québécois	John Kambites	9,583	33.69
Union Nationale	Georges Savoidakis	4,962	17.44
Democratic Alliance	Christos Syros	921	3.24
Ralliement créditiste	Denise Chartrand Marion	678	2.38
Communist	Madame Joseph Mallaroni	240	0.84
coalition: NPDQ - RMS	Pierre Bastien	206	0.72
Total valid votes		28,448	100.00
Rejected and declined votes		840	
Turnout		29,288	82.79
Electors on the lists		35,377	
Source: Official Results, Le Directeur général des élections du Québec.
