= René Lévesque =

Premier of Quebec from 1976 to 1985

René Lévesque GOQ
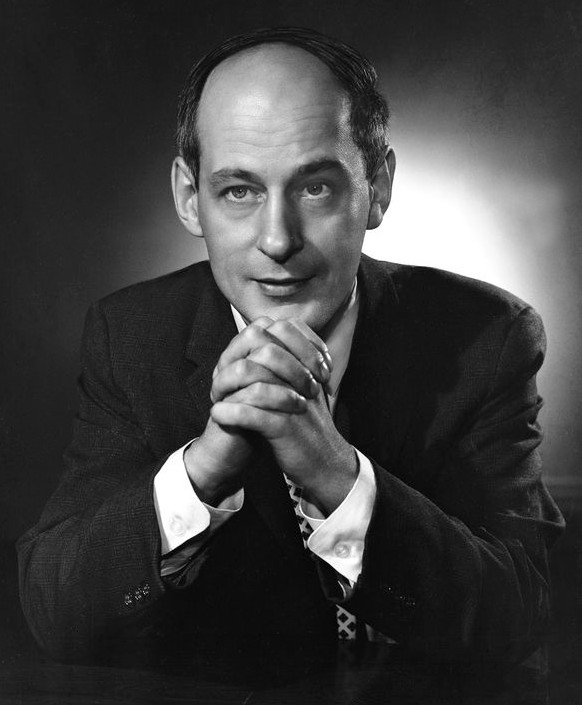
- Lévesque in 1961

23rd Premier of Quebec
- In office November 25, 1976 – October 3, 1985
- Monarch: Elizabeth II
- Lieutenant Governor: Hugues Lapointe; Jean-Pierre Côté; Gilles Lamontagne
- Deputy: Jacques-Yvan Morin; Camille Laurin; Marc-André Bédard
- Preceded by: Robert Bourassa
- Succeeded by: Pierre-Marc Johnson

Leader of the Parti Québécois
- In office October 14, 1968 – June 20, 1985
- Preceded by: Position established
- Succeeded by: Pierre-Marc Johnson

Member of the National Assembly of Québec
- In office June 22, 1960 – April 29, 1970
- Preceded by: Arsène Gagné
- Succeeded by: André Marchand
- Constituency: Montréal-Laurier (1960–66); Laurier (1966–1970)
- In office November 15, 1976 – December 2, 1985
- Preceded by: Guy Leduc
- Succeeded by: Claude Filion
- Constituency: Taillon

Personal details
- Born: August 24, 1922 Campbellton, New Brunswick, Canada
- Died: November 1, 1987 (aged 65) Montreal, Quebec, Canada
- Cause of death: Heart attack
- Party: Parti Québécois (after 1968); Liberal (1960–1967)
- Spouses: Louise L'Heureux (m. 1947; div. 1978) Corinne Côté (m. 1979)
- Profession: Journalist

Military service
- Allegiance: United States
- Branch/service: United States Army
- Years of service: 1944–45
- Rank: Liaison officer
- Battles/wars: World War II

René Lévesque (Note: Pronounced /ləˈvɛk/ lə-VEK, /leɪ-/ lay-; French: [ʁəne levɛɪ̯k]) (August 24, 1922 – November 1, 1987) was a Canadian politician and journalist who served as the 23rd premier of Quebec from 1976 to 1985. He was the first Québécois political leader since Confederation to seek, through a referendum, a mandate to negotiate the political independence of Quebec. Starting his career as a reporter, and radio and television host, he later became known for his eminent role in Quebec's nationalization of hydro-electric companies and as an ardent defender of Quebec sovereignty. He was the founder of the Parti Québécois, and before that, a Liberal minister in the Lesage government from 1960 to 1966.

== Early life ==
Lévesque was born in Campbellton, New Brunswick, on August 24, 1922. He was raised in New Carlisle, Quebec, on the Gaspé Peninsula, by his parents, Diane (née Dionne) and Dominic Lévesque, a lawyer. He had three younger siblings: André, Fernand and Alice. His father died when Lévesque was 14 years old.

== Journalist ==
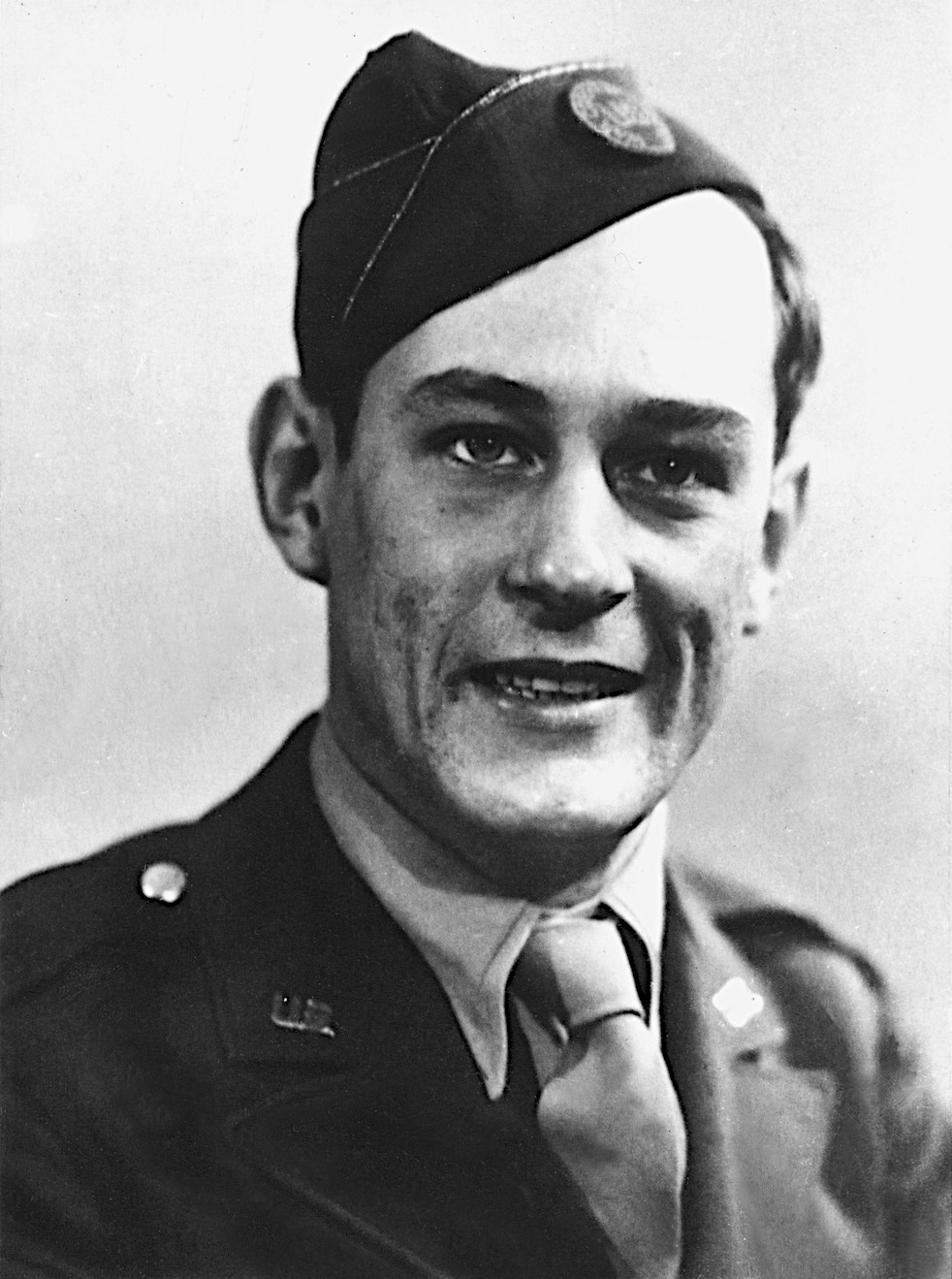
During World War II with the U.S. Office of War Information

Lévesque attended the Séminaire de Gaspé and the Saint-Charles-Garnier College in Quebec City, both of which were run by the Jesuits. He studied for a law degree at Université Laval in Quebec City, but left the university in 1943 without having completed the degree. One of his classmates at Laval later recounted that Lévesque had been smoking in class, and refused to apologize to the professor, Louis-Philippe Pigeon, who refused to allow him back to class. Lévesque left, saying he really only wanted to write, not practise law. He worked as an announcer and news writer at the radio station CHNC in New Carlisle, as a substitute announcer for CHRC during 1941 and 1942, and then at CBV in Quebec City.

During 1944–1945, he served as a liaison officer and war correspondent for the U.S. Army in Europe. He reported from London while it was under regular bombardment by the Luftwaffe, and advanced with the Allied troops as they pushed back the German army through France and Germany. Throughout the war, he made regular journalistic reports on the airwaves and in print. He was with the first unit of Americans to reach Dachau concentration camp.

In 1947, he married Louise L'Heureux, with whom he had two sons and a daughter. Lévesque worked as a reporter for the CBC's French-language section in the international service. He again served as a war correspondent for the CBC in the Korean War in 1952. After that, he was offered a career in journalism in the United States, but decided to stay in Canada.

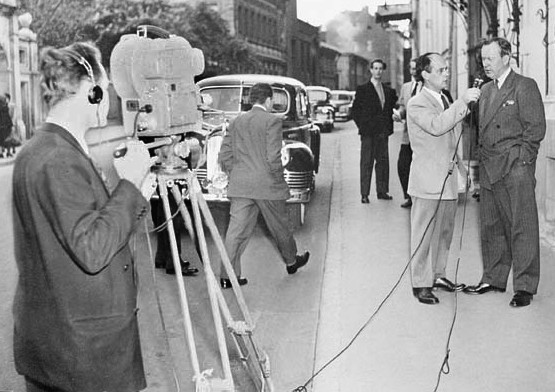
Lévesque interviews Lester Pearson, External Affairs Minister, in Moscow in 1955

From 1956 to 1959, Lévesque became famous in Quebec for hosting a weekly television news program on Radio-Canada called Point de Mire.

Lévesque covered international events and major labour struggles between workers and corporations that dogged the Union Nationale government of Premier Maurice Duplessis culminating with a great strike in 1957 at the Gaspé Copper Mine in Murdochville. The Murdochville strike was a milestone for organized labour in Quebec as it resulted in changes to the province's labour laws.

While working for the public television network, he became personally involved in the broadcasters' strike that lasted 68 tumultuous days beginning in late 1958. Lévesque was arrested during a demonstration in 1959, along with union leader Jean Marchand and 24 other demonstrators.

== Early political career ==
=== Libéral cabinet minister ===
In 1960, Lévesque entered politics as a star candidate and was elected to the Legislative Assembly of Quebec in the 1960 election as a Liberal Party member in the riding of Montréal-Laurier. In the government of Jean Lesage, he served as minister of hydroelectric resources and public works from 1960 to 1961, and minister of natural resources from 1961 to 1965. While in office, he played a pivotal role in the nationalization of hydroelectric companies, greatly expanding Hydro-Québec, one of the reforms that was part of the Quiet Revolution.

From 1965 to 1966, he served as minister of family and welfare. Lévesque, with his friend Eric Kierans, the Quebec minister of health, was heavily involved in negotiations with the Government of Canada to fund both Quebec and federal mandates for social programs.

In a surprise, the Liberals lost the 1966 election to the Union Nationale but Lévesque retained his own seat of Laurier. Believing that the Canadian federation was doomed to fail, Lévesque began to openly champion separation from Canada as part of the Liberal platform at the upcoming party conference. Kierans, who had been elected party president, led the movement against the motion, with future premier Robert Bourassa attempting to mediate the dispute before siding with Kierans. The resolution was handily defeated, and Lévesque walked out with his followers.

=== Founding of the Parti Québécois ===
After leaving the Liberal Party, he founded the Mouvement Souveraineté-Association (MSA). In contrast to more militant nationalist movements, such as Pierre Bourgault's Rassemblement pour l'Indépendance Nationale (RIN), the party eschewed direct action and protest and attempted instead to appeal to the broader electorate, whom Lévesque called "normal people". The main contention in the first party conference was the proposed policy toward Quebec's Anglophone minority; Lévesque faced down heavy opposition to his insistence that English schools and language rights be protected.

The election of hardline federalist Pierre Trudeau as Prime Minister, and the politically damaging riot instigated by the RIN when he appeared at the St. Jean Baptiste Day parade of 1968, led to the sovereignty movement coming together. The MSA merged with another party in the Quebec sovereignty movement, the Ralliement National of Gilles Grégoire, to create the Parti Québécois (PQ) in 1968. At Lévesque's insistence, RIN members were permitted to join but not accepted as a group.

The Parti Québécois gained 25 per cent of the vote in the 1970 election, running on a platform of declaring independence if government was formed. The PQ only won six seats, and Lévesque continued to run the party from Montreal by communicating with the caucus in Quebec City.

The 1973 election saw a large Liberal victory, and created major tensions within the party, especially after Lévesque was unable to gain a seat. A quarrel with House Leader Robert Burns almost ended Lévesque's leadership shortly thereafter.

== Premier of Quebec (1976–1985) ==
Lévesque and his party won a landslide victory at the 1976 election, with Lévesque finally re-entering the Assembly as the member for Taillon in downtown Longueuil. His party assumed power with 41.1 per cent of the popular vote and 71 seats out of 110, and even managed to unseat Bourassa in his own riding. Lévesque became premier of Quebec ten days later. The night of Lévesque's acceptance speech included one of his most famous quotations: "I never thought that I could be so proud to be Québécois."

=== French language ===
His government's signature achievement was the Quebec Charter of the French Language (introduced in the legislature and still colloquially known as Bill 101), whose stated goal was to make French "the normal and everyday language of work, instruction, communication, commerce and business". In its first enactment, it reserved access to English-language public schools to children whose parents had attended English school in Quebec. All other children were required to attend French schools in order to encourage immigrants to integrate themselves into the majority francophone culture. Lévesque was more moderate on language than some of the PQ, including the language minister, Camille Laurin. He would have resigned as leader rather than eliminate English-language public schools, as some party members proposed. Bill 101 also made it illegal for businesses to put up exterior commercial signs in a language other than French at a time when English dominated as a commercial and business language in Quebec.

=== Quebec nationalism ===
Lévesque was disappointed with the cold response by the American economic elite to his first speech in New York City as Premier of Quebec, in which he compared Quebec's march towards sovereignty to the American Revolution. His first speech in France was, however, more successful, leading him to a better appreciation of the French intelligentsia and of French culture.

On May 20, 1980, the PQ held, as promised before the elections, the 1980 Quebec referendum on its sovereignty-association plan. The result of the vote was 40 per cent in favour and 60 per cent opposed (with 86 per cent turnout). Lévesque conceded defeat in the referendum by announcing that, as he had understood the verdict, he had been told "until next time".

Lévesque led the PQ to victory in the 1981 election, increasing the party's majority in the National Assembly and increasing its share of the popular vote from 41 to 49 per cent.

A major focus of his second mandate was the patriation of the Canadian constitution. Lévesque was criticized by some in Quebec who said he had been tricked by Canadian Prime Minister Pierre Trudeau and the English-Canadian provincial premiers. To this day, no Quebec premier from any political party has endorsed the 1982 constitutional amendment.

=== Other policies and events ===
On February 6, 1977, Lévesque accidentally killed Edgar Trottier, a homeless man who had been lying on the road, while driving his car. Trottier had in the past repeatedly used the manoeuvre to secure a hospital bed for the night. Police officers at the scene did not administer the breathalyzer test to Lévesque, because they did not suspect that he was impaired. Lévesque was later fined $25 for failing to wear his glasses while driving a car on the night in question. The incident gained further notoriety when it was revealed that the female companion in the vehicle was not his wife, but his longtime secretary, Corinne Côté. Lévesque's marriage ended in divorce soon thereafter (the couple had already been estranged for some time), and in April 1979, he married Côté.

Lévesque's government completed the nationalization of hydroelectricity through Hydro-Québec. He also created the Quebec Charter of the French Language, the political party financing law, and the Parti Québécois itself. His government was the first in Canada to prohibit discrimination on the basis of sexual orientation in the province's Charte des droits de la personne in 1977. He also continued the work of the Lesage government in improving social services, in which social needs were taken care of by the state, rather than the Catholic Church (as in the Duplessis era) or the individual.

The PQ government's response to the recession of the early 1980s by cutting the provincial budget to reduce growing deficits that resulted from the recession angered labour union members, a core part of the constituency of the PQ and the sovereignty movement.

Lévesque's Act to govern the financing of political parties banned corporate donations and limited individual contributions to political parties to $3,000. This key legislation was meant to prevent wealthy citizens and organizations from having a disproportionate influence on the electoral process. A Referendum Act was passed to allow for a province-wide vote on issues presented in a referendum, giving a "yes" and "no" side equal funding and legal footing.

=== Resignation ===
Lévesque had argued that the party should not make sovereignty the object of the 1985 election and instead opt for the "Beau risque" strategy of seeking an understanding with the federal government of Brian Mulroney, which angered the strongest supporters of sovereignty within the party. He said the issue in the upcoming election would not be sovereignty. Instead, he expressed hope, "that we can finally find government leaders in Ottawa who will discuss Québec's demands seriously and work with us for the greater good of Québecers". His new stance weakened his position within the party. Some senior members resigned; there were by-election defeats. Lévesque resigned as leader of the Parti Québécois on June 20, 1985, and as premier of Québec on October 3, 1985.

== Retirement and death ==
Lévesque, a constant smoker, was hosting a dinner party in his Nuns' Island apartment on the evening of November 1, 1987, when he experienced chest pains; he died of a heart attack that night at Montreal General Hospital. A brief resurgence of separatist sentiment followed. Over 100,000 viewed his body lying in state in Montreal and Quebec City, over 10,000 went to his funeral in the latter city, and hundreds wept daily at his grave for months.

Lévesque was made a grand officer of the French Legion of Honour. He was posthumously made a grand officer of the National Order of Quebec in 2008.

== Legacy ==
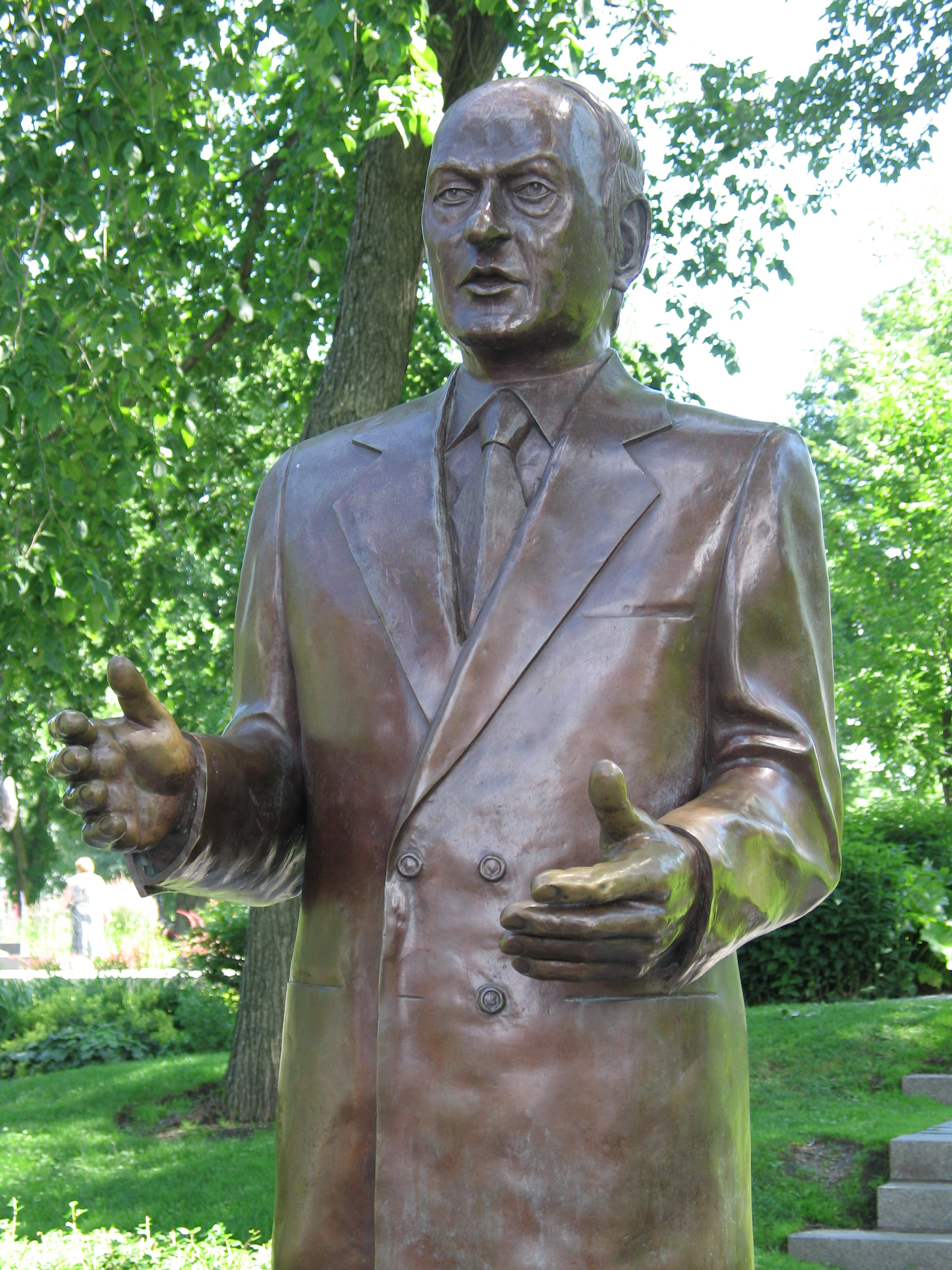
Lévesque sculpture in front of the Quebec Parliament Building

Lévesque's state funeral and funeral procession were reportedly attended by 100,000 people. During the carrying out of his coffin from the church, the crowd spontaneously began to applaud and sing Quebec's unofficial national anthem "Gens du pays", replacing the first verse with Mon cher René (My dear René), as is the custom when this song is adapted to celebrate someone's birthday. Two major boulevards now bear his name, one in Montreal and one in Quebec City. In Montreal, the Édifice Hydro-Québec and the Maison Radio-Canada are both located on René Lévesque Boulevard, fittingly as Lévesque once worked for Hydro-Québec and the CBC, respectively. On June 22, 2010, Hydro-Québec and the government of Quebec commemorated Lévesque's role in Quebec's Quiet Revolution and his tenure as premier by renaming the 1244-megawatt Manic-3 generating station in his honour.

On June 3, 1999, a monument in his honour was unveiled on boulevard René-Lévesque outside the Parliament Building in Quebec City. The statue is popular with tourists, who snuggle up to it, to have their pictures taken "avec René" (with René), despite repeated attempts by officials to keep people from touching the monument or getting too close to it. The statue had been the source of an improvised, comical and affectionately touching tribute to Lévesque. The fingers of his extended right hand are slightly parted, just enough so that tourists and the faithful could insert a cigarette, giving the statue an unusually realistic appearance.

This practice is less often seen now, however, as the statue was moved to New Carlisle and replaced by a similar, but bigger one. This change resulted from considerable controversy. Some believed that the life-sized statue was not appropriate for conveying his importance in the history of Quebec. Others noted that a trademark of Lévesque was his relatively small stature.

Lévesque today remains an important figure of the Quebec nationalist movement, and is considered sovereigntism's spiritual father. After his death, even people in disagreement with some of those convictions now generally recognize his importance to the history of Quebec. According to a survey in 2006 by Le Journal de Montréal and Léger Marketing, Lévesque was considered by far the best premier to run the province over the last fifty years.

Lévesque was notably portrayed in 1994 in the television series René Lévesque. In 2006, an additional television miniseries, René Lévesque, was aired on the CBC.

In 2023, the Prix du Québec created the Prix René-Lévesque to honour lifetime career achievements in Quebec journalism. The inaugural recipient was longtime television anchor Pierre Bruneau.

== Works ==
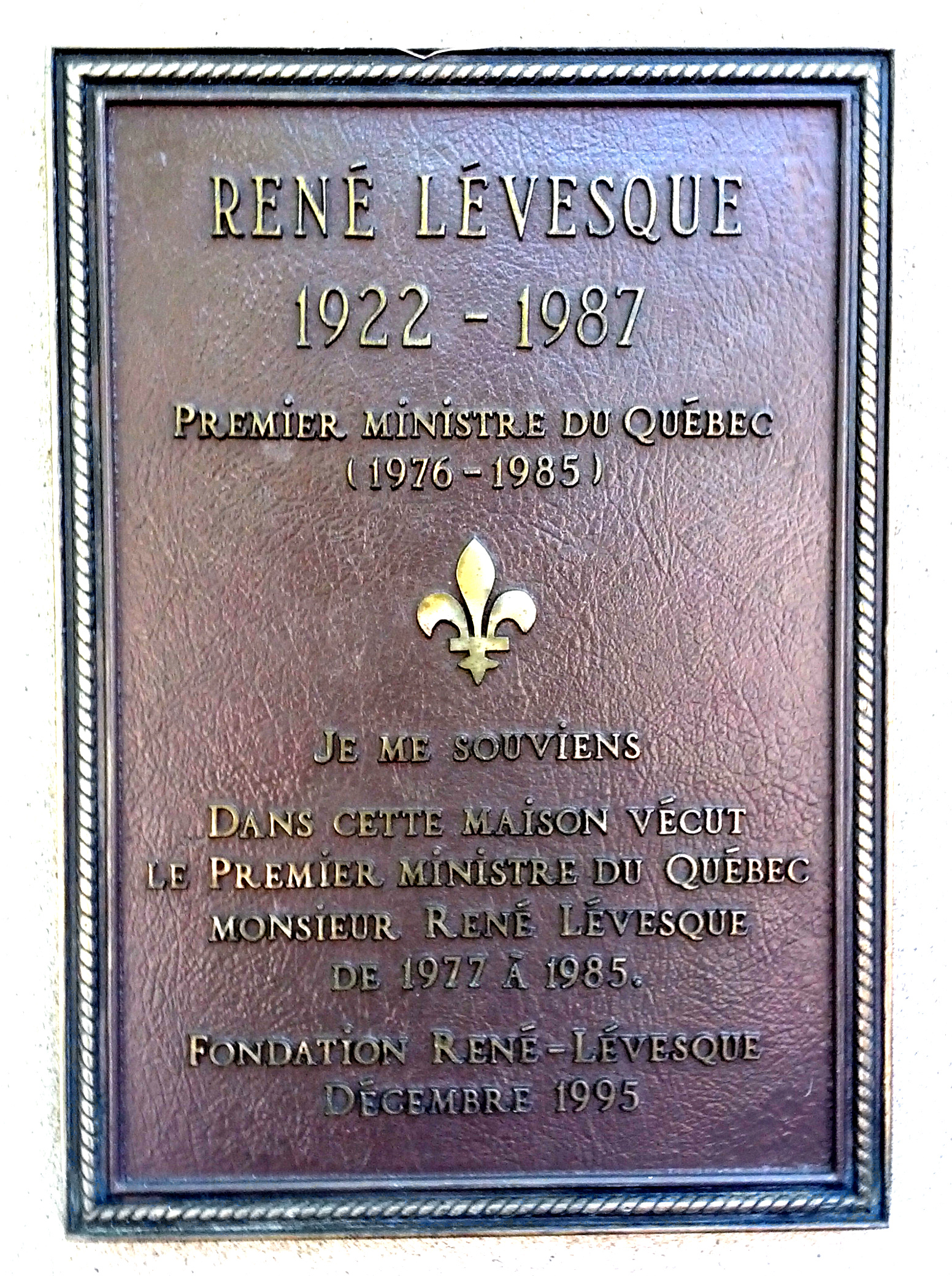
Memorial plaque in Québec City

- My Québec, 1979, Methuen, 191 pages, ISBN 0-458-93980-3
- Quotations from René Lévesque, 1977, Éditions Héritage, 105 pages ISBN 0-7773-3942-0
- An Option for Quebec, 1968, McClelland and Stewart, 128 pages
- "For an Independent Quebec", in Foreign Affairs, July 1976)
- Option Québec (1968)
- La passion du Québec (1978)
- Oui (1980)
- Attendez que je me rappelle (1986) (although the title is literally translated as Wait While I Remember, the title of the English-language version was Memoirs.)

== See also ==
- List of Gaspésiens
- List of premiers of Quebec
- List of Quebec general elections
- Politician nicknaming in Quebec
- Politics of Quebec
- Separatism

== Notes ==
National Assembly of Quebec
Preceded by Arsène Gagné (Union Nationale)	MNA, District of Laurier; 1960–1970	Succeeded by André Marchand (Liberal)
Preceded by Guy Leduc (Liberal)	MNA, District of Taillon; 1976–1985	Succeeded by Claude Filion (PQ)
Political offices
Preceded by Robert Bourassa (Liberal)	Premier of Quebec; 1976–1985	Succeeded by Pierre-Marc Johnson (PQ)
Party political offices
Preceded by none	Leader of the Parti Québécois; 1968–1985	Succeeded by Pierre-Marc Johnson
