= Alex Ivanovici =

Canadian actor and theatre director

Alex Ivanovici is a Canadian actor and theatre director. He is most noted for his supporting role in the film Winter Stories (Histoires d'hiver), for which he was a Genie Award nominee for Best Supporting Actor at the 20th Genie Awards.

He is married to playwright Annabel Soutar, with whom he cofounded the Porte Parole theatre company.
