= George Quaintance =

American artist

- Born: June 3, 1902; Page County, Virginia, U.S.
- Died: November 8, 1957 (aged 55)
- Occupation: Artist
- Spouse: Miriam Chester (1929)
- Partner: Victor Garcia

George Quaintance (June 3, 1902 – November 8, 1957) was an American artist, famous for his "idealized, strongly homoerotic" depictions of men in mid-20th-century physique magazines. Using historical settings to justify the nudity or distance the subjects from modern society, his art featured idealized muscular, semi-nude or nude male figures; Wild West settings were a common motif. His artwork helped establish the stereotype of the "macho stud" who was also homosexual, leading him to be called a "pioneer of a gay aesthetic". He was an influence on many later homoerotic artists, such as Tom of Finland.

== Biography ==
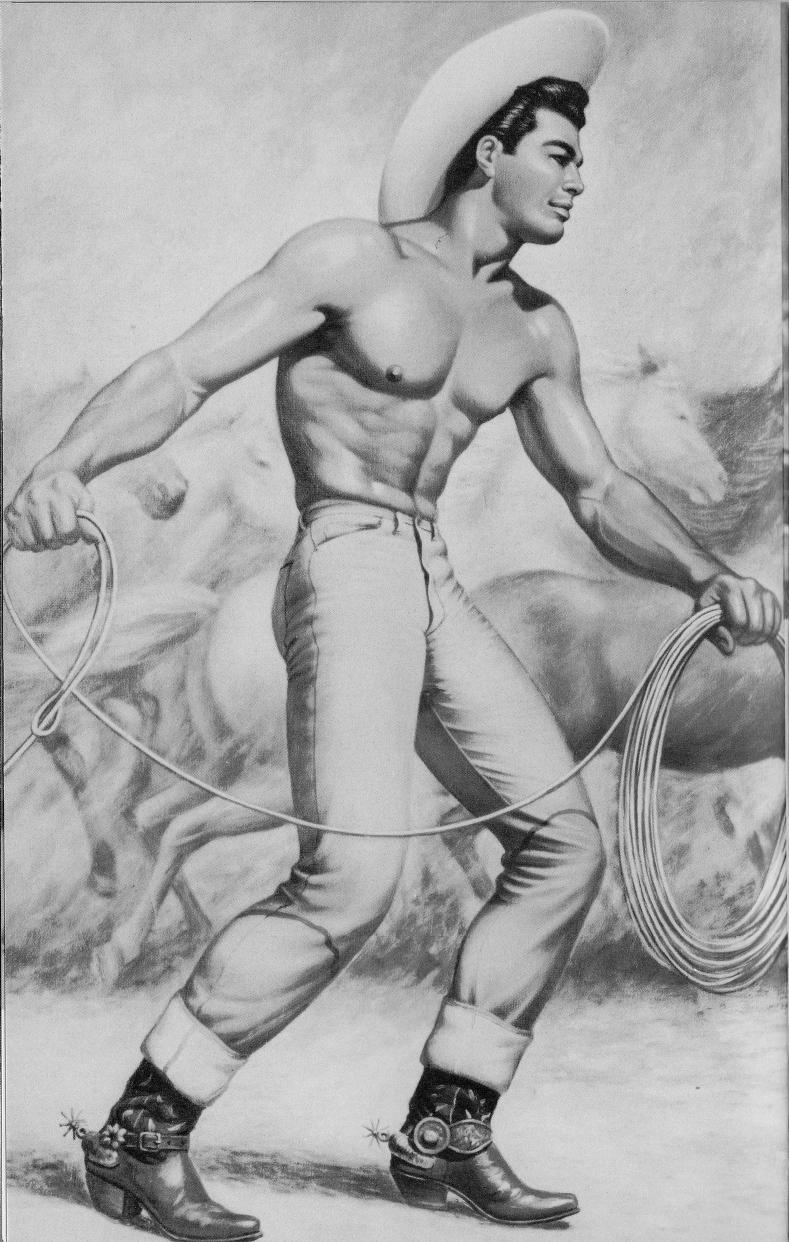
"Red Dust", a Quaintance painting with a signature wild west setting, printed in a 1955 issue of Physique Pictorial.

George Quaintance was born in Page County, Virginia, to George H. and Ella Belle Quaintance, with an older sister Nannie. He grew up on a farm, displaying an aptitude for art. Even as a teen, Quaintance has been described as "obviously and actively homosexual", despite being closeted. At the age of 18 he studied at the Art Students League in New York City, where, as well as painting and drawing, he studied dance, which led to him meeting and briefly marrying Miriam Chester. In the 1930s, he became a hairstylist.

His first art assignments were anonymous advertising work, but by 1934 he had begun to sell freelance cover illustrations to a variety of "spicy" pulp magazines, such as Gay French Life, Ginger, Movie Humor, Movie Merry Go-Round, Snappy Detective Mysteries, Snappy Stories, Stolen Sweets, and Tempting Tales. These were sold at burlesque halls as well as under-the-counter at discreet newsstands. These illustrations, which were clearly influenced by Enoch Bolles, were often signed "Geo. Quintana".

In 1938, he returned home with his companion Victor Garcia, described as Quaintance's "model, life partner, and business associate", who was the subject of many of Quaintance's photographs in the 1940s. During that time he was art editor for Joe Bonomo, who published women's magazines such as Glorify Your Figure, Beautify Your Figure, and Your Figure Beautiful. In 1951, Quaintance's art was used for the first cover of Physique Pictorial, edited by Bob Mizer of the Athletic Model Guild. His art would eventually be featured in a wide variety of physique magazines throughout the 1950s.

In the early 1950s, Quaintance and Garcia moved to Rancho Siesta, in Phoenix, Arizona, which became the home of Studio Quaintance, a business venture based around Quaintance's artworks. In 1953, Quaintance completed a series of three paintings about a matador, modeled by Angel Avila, another of his lovers. By 1956, the business had become so successful that Quaintance could not keep up with the demand for his works.

Quaintance had a close connection with Randolph Benson and John Bullock, the cofounders of physique magazine Grecian Guild Pictorial. He wrote a personal essay for the magazine's spring 1956 issue in which he provided a sketch of his life and career, and answered reader questions.

Quaintance died of a heart attack on November 8, 1957.
