= Suzanne Champagne =

Canadian actress

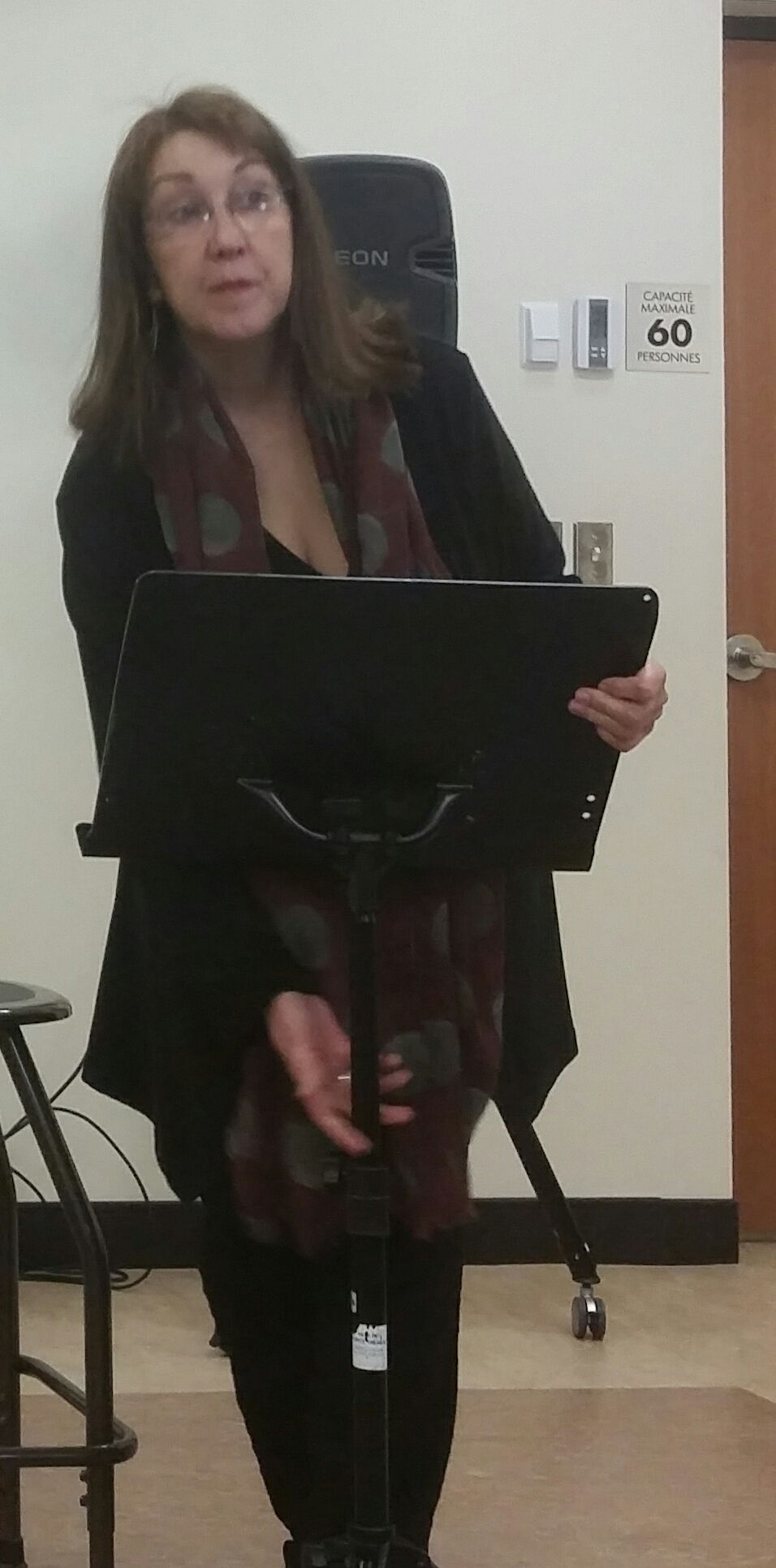
- Born: May 8, 1956 (age 69); Montreal, Quebec
- Occupation: actress
- Years active: 1970s-present

Suzanne Champagne (born May 8, 1956) is a Canadian actress from Quebec. She is most noted for her performance in the 1999 film Winter Stories (Histoires d'hiver), for which she was a Genie Award nominee for Best Supporting Actress at the 20th Genie Awards in 2000.

She has also appeared in the films In the Belly of the Dragon (Dans le ventre du dragon), Montreal Stories (Montréal vu par...), Maman Last Call, Detour (Détour), French Kiss and Maria, and the television series À plein temps, Avec un grand A, Jamais deux sans toi, Watatatow, Scoop, La Petite Vie, Les Invincibles, Musée Eden and Lâcher prise.
