= Nadia Brédimas-Assimopoulos =

Canadian politician

Interim President of the Parti Québécois
- In office 1985–1985
- Preceded by: René Lévesque
- Succeeded by: Pierre-Marc Johnson

Vice-President of the Parti Québécois
- In office 1984–1988
- Preceded by: Sylvain Simard

President of the Conseil supérieur de la langue française
- In office 1996–2005

Personal details
- Born: Nadia Assimpoulos Athens, Greece
- Died: October 11, 2017 (aged 73) Montreal, Quebec, Canada
- Party: Parti Québécois
- Spouse: Basile Assimopoulos
- Profession: Academic, administrator, and politician

Nadia Brédimas-Assimopoulos was a Greek-born Canadian politician, academic, and administrator who served as the interim president of the Parti Québécois in 1985, the first woman to serve in the role. She was the vice-president of the Parti Québécois from 1984 to 1988 and later served as president of the Conseil supérieur de la langue française.

== Life and career ==
Nadia (Constantine) Assimopoulos (née Bredima) was born to an academic family in Athens, Greece, with strong social democratic connections; her father's books were burned as subversive by the right-wing military dictatorship that governed the country from 1967 to 1974. She moved to Quebec in 1969, later attended the Sorbonne, and wrote a Ph.D. thesis on the linguistic integration of Montreal's Greek community. Before 2000, she was known as Nadia Assimpoulos She was married to Basile Assimopoulos. She died in 2017.

== Parti Québécois ==
She first ran as Parti Québécois candidate in the 1981 provincial election in the riding of Laurier, at a time when the party was reaching out to non-francophone cultural communities. Associated with the social-democratic wing of the party, she later criticized PQ Premier René Lévesque for imposing back-to-work legislation on striking teachers.

Assimopoulos was elected to the powerful post of PQ vice-president in 1984, defeating Paul Bégin and succeeding Sylvain Simard. When Lévesque announced his resignation as premier in June 1985, she was also chosen as the party's interim president. In this capacity, she had a prominent organizational role in the leadership convention that chose Pierre-Marc Johnson as Levesque's successor.

The PQ was defeated in the 1985 election, and Assimopoulos was personally defeated in her second bid for public office. She continued to support Johnson's leadership after the election, including his decision to downplay Quebec sovereignty in favour of a "new national affirmation" in the existing federalist model. He was unable to build consensus support for this position, however, and resigned as party leader in 1987. His successor, Jacques Parizeau, was a hardline separatist; Assimopoulos resigned the vice-presidency in 1988 because she could not support the party's policy direction.

Assimopoulos remained outside the PQ organization during Parizeau's tenure as leader. Following the narrow federalist victory in the 1995 Quebec referendum, she condemned Parizeau's remark that the "ethnic vote" had deprived the sovereigntists of victory.

== Later career ==
Lucien Bouchard succeeded Parizeau as party leader and premier in 1996 and shortly thereafter appointed Assimopoulos as president of the Conseil supérieur de la langue francaise in a bid to rebuild connections with Quebec's cultural communities. Regarded as a moderate, she originally favoured maintaining the status quo of Quebec's controversial language legislation. She later argued that tougher laws might be needed, after several bilingual commercial signs appeared across the province. She was quoted as saying, "There is a great risk that bilingualism spreads, in a short period of time, across the whole province and Quebec loses its French face."

She remained as president of the conseil until 2005.
