= Pierre Bruneau (journalist) =

Canadian journalist and news anchor

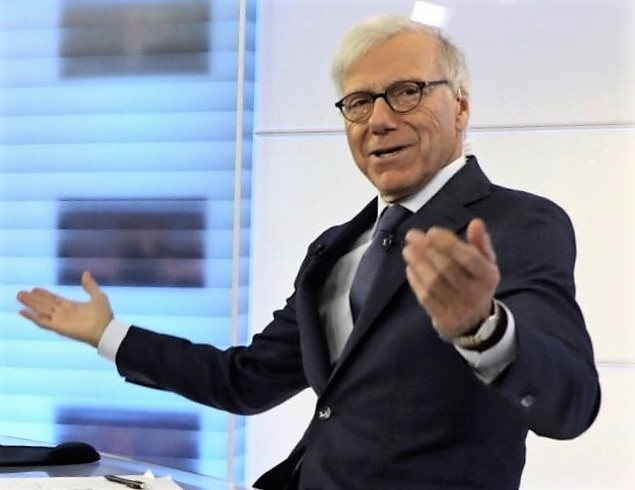
Bruneau in 2018

Pierre Bruneau, CM (French pronunciation: [pjɛʁ bʁyno]; born June 5, 1952 in Victoriaville, Quebec) is a Canadian journalist and news anchor. He is the longtime anchor of the weekday edition of TVA Nouvelles news bulletins which air on the Quebec television network TVA every weekday.

== Background ==
Bruneau started his media career on Victoriaville's CFDA in 1972 while studying psychology at Université du Québec. He later worked for the now-defunct Trois-Rivières's CJTR, as well as for Montreal's CKAC and CITE as a host and reporter. In 1976, he became a news anchor for Télé-Metropole, which later became TVA. At first he was the anchor of the 6 PM evening news and also became co-anchor after 2000 for the midday and 5 PM newscast alongside Pierre Jobin and Paul Larocque, respectively. For several years, Claude Charron, former Parti Québécois MNA and Cabinet Minister was pairing with Bruneau on the late afternoon news. He was also the host of other shows such as Qu'en pense le Quebec and Y'a du soleil. In 2006, Bruneau celebrated his 30 years of work for TVA and received several awards. He was also inducted in 2003 into the Canadian Association of Broadcasters Hall of Fame.

In March 2022, Bruneau announced his retirement from TVA, effective June 19. He was subsequently named as the recipient of the Academy of Canadian Cinema and Television's Lifetime Achievement Award at the 11th Canadian Screen Awards in 2023.

In the same year, he was named the inaugural recipient of the Prix René-Lévesque, the new Prix du Québec award for lifetime achievement in journalism.

== Fondation Charles-Bruneau ==
In 1988, his son Charles died after a lengthy battle against leukemia which developed nine years before. This led to the creation of the Fondation Charles-Bruneau, in which he is the president. The cancer center named in honor of Charles Bruneau opened in 1995 nearby the Sainte-Justine's Children Hospital in Montreal. The center is responsible for the cancer treatment of hundreds of children each year. Each year, numerous events such as the 24 Hours of Tremblant (at Mont-Tremblant) weekend skiing marathon, collects funding for improvement of the cancer center such as research, equipment and construction of new facilities or units. In 2007, the center added a new pavilion with additional beds and laboratories.
