= John Duffie (writer) =

Canadian humorist and columnist (1913–1989)

- Born: John Wilson Duffie; May 15, 1913; Saint-Lambert, Quebec, Canada
- Died: February 9, 1989 (aged 75); Vancouver, British Columbia, Canada
- Occupations: Writer, humor columnist
- Writing career
- Notable work: Duffie's Unimportance of Being Earnest (1982)

John Wilson Duffie (May 15, 1913 - February 9, 1989) was a Canadian writer. A longtime humor columnist for the arts and entertainment publication Monday Magazine in Victoria, British Columbia, he was most noted for his 1982 book Duffie's Unimportance of Being Earnest, a collection of his magazine writing which was shortlisted for the Stephen Leacock Memorial Medal for Humour in 1983.

Born in Saint-Lambert, Quebec, Duffie spent much of his working life as a property tax manager for Marathon Realty in Toronto, Ontario, until retiring from that job around age 60. He and his wife Edith then moved to Victoria in 1973, where he began writing "Overset", his Monday Magazine column, just a few weeks after the publication launched in 1975. His writing also appeared in Edmonton magazine and Wildlife Review, whose editor once praised Duffie as the only writer in his publication who could write funny stuff about animals.

In the late 1980s, after his wife's death, he moved to Vancouver to be closer to his daughters and grandchildren, but continued writing his column until his death in 1989. Following his death, the Victoria Public Library set up a memorial endowment fund in his memory.
