= Kenneth MacLean Glazier Sr. =

Canadian minister and librarian (1912–1989)

Kenneth MacLean Glazier Sr. (September 21, 1912 – November 11, 1989) was a Canadian Presbyterian minister and librarian.

He was inducted into Glenview Presbyterian Church in Toronto April 1946. He later became librarian at the Hoover Institution at Stanford University. He went on to serve as chief librarian of the University of Calgary Library.

While at the University of Calgary, he established in the Rare Books and Special Collections of the library the Kenneth M. Glazier Collection of the papers of Canadian authors, including those of Hugh MacLennan and Mordecai Richler.

He wrote or edited Africa South of the Sahara: A Select & Annotated Bibliography, 1964-1968 and South Africa; a collection of miscellaneous documents, 1958-1963. With Peter Duigan, he authored A checklist of serials for African studies.

He founded the Kenneth Maclean Glazier Scholarship for the study of Canadian literature at the university.

== Politics ==
He was Secretary of the Alberta Liberal Party.

== Family ==
In 1940, he married Lily Teresa Ferster; they had three children: Gretchen, and twins, Christopher and Kenneth.

== Death ==
He died of a heart attack in Calgary on November 11, 1989.

== Kenneth MacLean Glazier ==
It is important to distinguish him from his son, Kenneth MacLean Glazier ( Harvard Student Strike), who is a California attorney, known as "Kenneth M. Glazier" or "Kenneth MacLean Glazier", although there are instances of Kenneth M. Glazier Sr. being referred to as such following his son's birth.
