= Derek Famulare =

Canadian professional ice hockey player

- Born: December 22, 1989 (age 35); Montreal, Quebec, Canada
- Height: 6 ft 3 in (191 cm)
- Weight: 205 lb (93 kg; 14 st 9 lb)
- Position: Forward
- Shoots: Left
- LNAH team Former teams: Laval Prédateurs: Cornwall River Kings (LNAH); HC TPS (Liiga)
- NHL draft: Undrafted
- Playing career: 2011–present

Derek Famulare (born December 22, 1989) is a Canadian professional ice hockey player. He most recently played for Laval Prédateurs of the LNAH. He previously played for HC TPS of the Liiga. Famulare was born to a Finnish mother and a Canadian father, and also holds a Finnish citizenship.

Famulare played junior hockey for the Chicoutimi Saguenéens, Val-d'Or Foreurs, Acadie-Bathurst Titan and Prince Edward Island Rocket from 2006 until 2010. Famulare attended Concordia University for one year, then turned professional in Europe with TUTO Hockey of the Mestis league in Finland. Famulare made his Liiga debut playing with HC TPS during the 2013–14 Liiga season. He returned to Canada to join the Cornwall River Kings of the LNAH in 2014. He signed with the Laval Prédateurs in 2015, but only played one game.
