= Winter Stories (film) =

- French: Histoires d'hiver
- Directed by: François Bouvier
- Written by: François Bouvier; Marc Robitaille
- Based on: Des histoires d'hiver, avec des rues, des écoles et du hockey by Marc Robitaille
- Produced by: Claude Gagnon; Yuri Yoshimura-Gagnon
- Starring: Joël Drapeau-Dalpé; Denis Bouchard; Luc Guérin; Diane Lavallée; Suzanne Champagne
- Cinematography: Allen Smith
- Edited by: André Corriveau
- Music by: Michel Rivard
- Release date: 1999
- Running time: 105 minutes
- Country: Canada
- Language: French

Winter Stories (French: Histoires d'hiver) is a 1999 Canadian sports drama film. Directed by François Bouvier and written by Bouvier and Marc Robitaille as an adaptation of Robitaille's book Des histoires d'hiver, avec des rues, des écoles et du hockey, the film centres on a young boy's obsession with ice hockey in the 1960s.

The film stars Joël Drapeau-Dalpé as Martin Roy, a boy on the cusp of his teenage years and in his final year of junior high school in 1966. A passionate fan of hockey, particularly of the Montreal Canadiens, he idolizes Henri Richard. However, over the course of the winter he begins to learn that there are many more things in the world to discover, including pot, philosophy and pretty girls.

The film's cast also includes Luc Guérin as Martin's father, Denis Bouchard as his uncle Maurice, Suzanne Champagne as his homeroom teacher Mme Chouinard, and Alex Ivanovici as his English teacher.

== Awards ==
The film garnered seven Genie Award nominations at the 20th Genie Awards:

- Best Picture
- Best Actor (Drapeau-Dalpé, Bouchard)
- Best Supporting Actor (Ivanovici)
- Best Supporting Actress (Champagne)
- Best Adapted Screenplay (Bouvier, Robitaille)
- Best Editing (André Corriveau)
