= Nola Chilton =

Israeli theatre director (1922–2021)

- נולה צ'ילטון
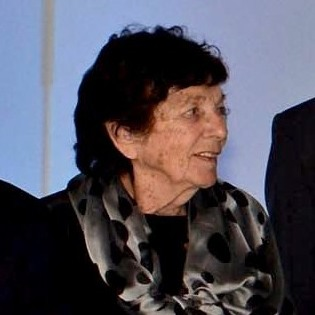
- Chilton in 2013
- Born: Celia Truger; 12 February 1922; Brooklyn, New York City, New York, United States
- Died: 8 October 2021 (aged 99); Israel
- Occupations: Theater director, acting teacher
- Known for: Socially engaged theater in Israel; Directing and acting teaching
- Awards: Israel Prize (2013)

Nola Chilton (born Celia Truger; Hebrew: נולה צ'ילטון; 12 February 1922 – 8 October 2021) was an American-born Israeli theater director and acting teacher. She was a pioneer of socially engaged theater in Israel. In 2013, Chilton was awarded the Israel Prize for theater.

== Biography ==
Nola Chilton was born in Brooklyn, New York to Jewish immigrants from Russian Empire. Her mother died of tuberculosis when she was twelve. Her father was a jewelry engraver and food peddler. She studied acting under Lee Strasberg and worked at the Actors Studio, coaching actors and directing. In 1960, she directed an off-off Broadway production of "Dead End," a radical play about the miserable lives of poverty-stricken young people, in which Dustin Hoffman appeared.

In 1963, Chilton immigrated to Israel, settling in Kiryat Gat, then a small town in the northern Negev. She worked briefly for the Cameri Theater but was not enamored with the Tel Aviv scene, which reminded her of what she had left behind. She adopted a two-year-old girl and moved to the north of the country, first to Kibbutz Ma'agan Michael and then Kibbutz Yasur.

=== Artistic career ===
In Israel, Chirlton directed, among other plays, The Summer of the Seventeenth Doll (or "The 17th Doll") at the Cameri Theatre, and the Israeli version of the renowned play Barefoot in the Park (later adapted into a successful film), produced by Giora Godik at the Nachmani Hall in 1965.

In the 1970s, she began directing in the style of Documentary Theater. Her working method was based on interviews, research, and group work with a regular ensemble of actors. She directed the satirical play Coexistence (which dealt with the Palestinian issue), A Bicycle for a Year (on the subject of Development Towns), and The Coming Days (on aging).

During the 1970s, she established a project in the city of Kiryat Shmona that introduced new plays and unique productions. Participants in the project included her students from Tel Aviv University, such as: Itzik Weingarten, Ofra Weingarten, Moni Moshonov, Sandra Sade, Shlomo Bar-Aba, Hava Ortman, Dalik Wollinitz, Arnon Zadok, and others.

From 1973 to 1975, she worked at the Haifa Theatre with Yehoshua Sobol on his play The Twentieth Night. The play was written through improvisations with the actors and, following its run in Haifa, was subsequently staged on many stages in Israel, including numerous amateur productions. In 1976, she directed the play Kriza in Haifa, which was one of the first plays in Israel to address the issue of ethnic discrimination against the Mizrahi population.

=== Later work (1988–2019) ===
- In 1988, she directed the play Investigation at the Cameri Theatre, which included two short plays written by Daniela Carmi: Spring Room and All the Time in the World to Eat Plums.
- In 1990, she directed Of Mice and Men by John Steinbeck at the Habima Theatre.
- In 1992, she directed the play Israel Ten Points by Daniela Carmi at the Haifa Theatre.
- In 1994, she directed Last Treatments by A.B. Yehoshua at Tzavta Tel Aviv, starring Gedalia Besser, Germaine Unikovsky, Shmulik Calderon, and Miki Mavorach.
- In 1996, she directed Uncle Vanya by Anton Chekhov at the Sifria Theatre (Library Theatre).
- In 1999, she directed Strangers by Yehoshua Sobol at the Habima Theatre, starring Moni Moshonov and Sandra Sade.
- In 2001, she independently produced and directed the play What We Talk About When We Talk About Love, based on a short story by Raymond Carver.
- In 2003, she directed the play Homeless by Itzik Weingarten at the Tmuna Theatre.
- In 2004, she directed the bilingual children's play Samir and Yonatan on the Planet Mars by Daniela Carmi, as part of the Haifa Festival for Children's Plays.
- In 2005, she directed the play Real Time by Yehoshua Sobol at the Habima Theatre.
- In 2006, a tribute event was held for Chirlton at Tel Aviv University, with the participation of Oded Kotler, Moni Moshonov, Sandra Sade, Laura Rivlin, Shlomo Bar-Aba, Yehoshua Sobol, Eli Gorenstein, and others. Two years later, the show was restaged as part of the Women's Festival in Holon, under the artistic direction of her student Daniela Michaeli. That same year, she directed the play Winter in Qalandia, based on the book by Leah Nirgad, at the Arab-Hebrew Theatre of Jaffa in cooperation with Seminar HaKibbutzim College.
- In 2008, she directed Holy Land by the Algerian playwright Mohamed Kacimi at the Khan Theatre. The play dealt with the life of a Palestinian family in the territories and their struggle with the Israeli occupation. Also that year, she directed the play Bedouins.
- In 2009, she directed Darfur at Home by Yehoshua Sobol.
- In 2010, she directed Endgame by Samuel Beckett at the Khan Theatre.
- In 2012, she directed the play Fima at the Herzliya Ensemble Theatre, an adaptation of Amos Oz's book "The Third State," which she co-wrote with Assaf Ofek.
- In 2019, on the first anniversary of Amos Oz's death, she teamed up with actor Dalik Wollinitz to direct his solo performance Here and There in the Land of Israel, based on Oz's book.

In 2013, Chilton was awarded the Israel Prize for theater.

=== Academic and social activity ===
In the early 1970s, Chilton began teaching in the Department of Theatre Arts at Tel Aviv University, where she taught continuously until her retirement. Within the department, she staged two plays following the Yom Kippur War. The first, What I Think About the War, won the David's Harp Award in 1974. After the ceremony, Chirlton returned the award in protest against the omission of sections of the play from the television coverage. The second play, Friends Talk to Gidi (1975), focused on Gidi Rosenthal, a department student who fell in the war. In the early 1980s, she was granted the rank of Professor-Artist.

Over the years, she held various administrative positions in the Theatre Department and the Faculty of Arts and served as a Senior Lecturer for over four decades. Among other subjects, she taught courses with an emphasis on physical theatre, acting and directing methods, and actor coaching.

She retired from teaching in 2017, at the age of 95.

== Personal life ==
She was married to author John Auerbach, who died in 2002. Chilton was latterly a resident of Kibbutz Sdot Yam.

She died on 8 October 2021, at the age of 99.

== Legacy and influence ==
Chilton was the inspiration for The Open Theater, an experimental theatre group active from 1963 to 1973 in New York City founded by her students to implement her "post-method," post-absurd acting technique through a collaborative process that explores political, artistic, and social issues. She also gave acting lessons to Charles Kerbs, among others.
