= Johnny Favourite Swing Orchestra =

Canadian swing revival band

- Origin: Halifax, Nova Scotia, Canada
- Genres: Swing revival
- Years active: 1996–2000
- Label: Universal
- Past members: Stuart "Johnny Favourite" Bastow; John Wesley Chisholm; Trevor Wentzell; Pat Leonard; Wes Mackey Jr.; Colin Hudson; Pete Johnston; Matt Myer; Craig Sheppard; "Hound Dog" Dave Fitzgerald; Eric Landry; Andrew Killawee; David Christensen; Dawn Hatfield; Dean Drouillard; Ryan Fontaine; Marty Coles; Shaun Murphy

Johnny Favourite Swing Orchestra was a Canadian swing revival band, active in the late 1990s.

Formed in Halifax, Nova Scotia, by jazz singer Stuart "Johnny Favourite" Bastow, the band released its debut album The Life Desire independently in 1997.

Other band members included John Wesley Chisholm, Wes Mackey Jr., Colin Hudson, Pete Johnston, Matt Myer, Craig Sheppard, "Hound Dog" Dave Fitzgerald, Eric Landry, David Christensen, Dawn Hatfield, and Andrew Killawee.

They won an East Coast Music Award for Best Jazz Group in 1998, and signed to Universal Records that year. Soon afterward, however, Chisholm left the band after the birth of his second child; he subsequently received two Genie Award nominations, for both Best Original Song and Best Original Score, for his work composing music for the film Beefcake.

The band's second album, Holiday Romance, was released in fall 1998.

By this time the band was a popular touring act, whose live show included original material, jazz standards and covers of classic and hard rock songs by bands such as Led Zeppelin and The Band. They garnered radio and MuchMusic airplay for singles such as "Rootbeer & Licorice" and "We Still Talk". "Rootbeer & Licorice" charted on the Adult Contemporary charts in RPM, peaking at #32 the week of January 11, 1999.

The band won the Juno Award for Best New Group at the Juno Awards of 1999.

Because the band had up to 14 members at various times, it underwent frequent personnel changes and internal tensions. The band broke up following a show in Halifax in early 2000; Bastow continued to use the name Johnny Favourite as a solo artist, and released his first solo album The Tonight Album in fall 2000. Five of the former Swing Orchestra band members continued as his solo backing band. He moved to Portugal for several years in the 2000s, before returning to Canada near the end of the decade; his second solo album, Troubadour, was released in 2010.
