= Andrew Burchill Lynch =

Canadian newspaper publisher (1941–2001)

- Born: 27 December 1941; Toronto, Ontario
- Died: 24 February 2001 (aged 59); Victoria, British Columbia
- Occupations: Publisher, Journalist
- Writing career
- Subjects: Politics, Media

Andrew Burchill Lynch (27 December 1941 – 24 February 2001) was an early partner and, later, publisher of Monday Magazine, a left-wing alternative weekly newspaper in Victoria, British Columbia, Canada.

From the late 1970s to mid-1980s Lynch operated Monday Magazine alongside founding publisher Gene Miller and third partner George Heffelfinger. When Miller sold his one-third interest in the publication in 1988, Lynch and Heffelfinger continued on as partners. As publisher, Lynch maintained a prominent role in the overall operations of Monday. In the 1990s Lynch faced increasing pressure from media conglomerate Island Publishers Ltd. which sought to assume control of the independent weekly.

When Monday Magazine was finally purchased by media baron David Holmes Black's Island Publishers Ltd., in 1996, Lynch moved on and embedded himself as a reporter covering the B.C. Legislature. In 1997, he founded The Lynch Report on B.C. Politics, a newsletter covering the ins and outs of the Legislative Assembly of British Columbia. Rich Coleman, Member of the Legislative Assembly for Fort Langley-Aldergrove, regarded Lynch's newsletter as "required reading" for MLAs.

Shortly after founding of the Lynch Report, Lynch was elected by his peers as president of the B.C. Legislature Press Gallery. He remained president until his death in February 2001.

== Personal life ==
Lynch was the son of Canadian journalist and author Charles Lynch and the maternal grandson of Canadian Press journalist and poet Andrew D. Merkel. Lynch died from cancer on 24 February 2001 in a Victoria hospital.
