= Heather Erxleben =

Canadian Forces soldier (born 1966)

- Born: 1966 (age 59–60)
- Military career
- Allegiance: Canada
- Branch: Canadian Forces
- Rank: Soldier
- Units: 3rd Battalion Princess Patricia's Canadian Light Infantry
- Other work: Nurse

Heather Erxleben (born 1966) is a former Canadian Forces soldier who was the first female to graduate from a Regular Force infantry trades training course. She graduated from the PPCLI Battle School in CFB Wainwright, Alberta on January 19, 1989. Other women had attempted to pass the 16-week training course, but she was the first to succeed.

Her first assignment after training was to 3rd Battalion Princess Patricia's Canadian Light Infantry, at that time stationed in BC. She was in the military for three years, and left the services after her initial commitment was completed.

Before her time in the Canadian Forces, Erxleben drove a truck for a lumber company. As of 2006, Heather Erxleben is a nurse in British Columbia.

== Sources ==
- "Woman, 22, Makes history as Canadian combat soldier" The Ottawa Citizen. Ottawa, Ont: Jan 20, 1989. pg. A.5
