= Physique Pictorial =

American gay erotic magazine

- Physique Pictorial, volume 5 number 2, Summer 1955
- Editor: Bob Mizer
- Categories: Beefcake (1951–1969); Erotica (1969–1990)
- Frequency: Quarterly
- Format: Digest
- Publisher: Athletic Model Guild
- First issue: 1951
- Final issue: 1990
- Based in: Los Angeles
- Language: English
- OCLC: 643902464

Physique Pictorial is an American magazine, one of the leading beefcake magazines of the mid-20th century. During its run from 1951 to 1990 as a quarterly publication, it exemplified the use of bodybuilding culture and classical art figure posing, as a cover for homoerotic male images, and to evade charges of obscenity.

The pages of Physique Pictorial primarily featured the photography of Bob Mizer, who also served as the magazine's publisher and editor, consisting of black and white photos of athletic young men, either nude or nearly so. The magazine also served as a venue for homoerotic artists including Touko Laaksonen (Tom of Finland), George Quaintance, Dom Orejudos (Etienne), Bill Schmeling (Torro, The Hun), and Mike Miksche (Steve Masters), and was a predecessor to later overtly gay publications.

Physique Pictorial was published in Los Angeles by Mizer's Athletic Model Guild, an ersatz modeling agency that provided cover for the publishing of the magazine, and the sale of photographs and film strips through the magazine.

== Background ==
Bob Mizer began his work as a physique photographer in the early 1940s, photographing young men at Muscle Beach. In 1947, he began advertising his photographs in the back pages of the bodybuilding magazine Strength & Health, along with other gay physique photographers of the time. Mizer was prosecuted for distributing obscenity through the mail, and sentenced to a year on a prison farm. Subsequently, the US Postal Service pressured Strength & Health to cease running advertisements for physique photographs, threatening to revoke its second-class mailing permit. This led Mizer to the idea of founding his own magazine, devoted to physique photography designed for a gay audience.

== History ==
The first issue of Mizer's magazine was published in May 1951 under the title Physique Photo News. Six months later, the magazine was rebranded Physique Pictorial. Mizer contended that this title was more apt since, in addition to physique photography, the magazine also included artwork by artists such as George Quaintance. While the first issue was a free eight page booklet, subsequent issues increased in size, with additional full-page photographic prints, and in 1952 the price was increased first to fifteen cents, then to twenty-five.

There was a gap in the magazine's run covering most of the year 1968. Author Jeffrey Escoffier speculates that this was because Mizer served time in prison that year on charges of running a prostitution operation.

Physique publications rapidly fell out of popularity in the late 1960s as new legal precedent allowed magazines to print full-frontal nudity. Starting in 1969, Physique Pictorial ceased to operate as a physique magazine, and instead switched to fully nude photographs. Scholar Christopher Nealon described the magazine as having become "more of a catalog for wrestling and bondage videos" by the 1980s.

The magazine finished its original run in 1990. In 2017, it was relaunched by the Bob Mizer Foundation featuring a mix of legacy Mizer photographs and contemporary photographers' work.

=== Volume 76 (Spring 2026) ===
Volume 76 was published in Spring 2026 as a limited edition of 1,000 numbered copies worldwide. The issue includes archival material from the Bob Mizer Foundation alongside contemporary photographers' work. Contents include:

- Bell, Dennis. "State of the Archive." pp. 4–5.
- Foote, Keith. "Densman Twins." pp. 6–15.
- Bob Mizer Foundation. "Slava Mogutin." pp. 18–31.
- Owen, Stephen. "Spanko! AMG and the Rise of the Spanking Community." pp. 32–40.
- Bob Mizer Foundation. "Alexander Courtman." pp. 41–51.
- Crable, Corbin. "Ten-Hut." pp. 54–63.
- Bob Mizer Foundation. "Tomaroids." pp. 64–71.
- Bob Mizer Foundation. "Natural Terrain: Dave Martin's Subversive San Francisco." pp. 72–79.
- Bell, Den. "Material History." pp. 81–85.
- Bob Mizer Foundation. "Luca Varano." pp. 86–93.

== Editorial content ==
Mizer was known to use the editorial section of Physique Pictorial to advocate for political causes. Mizer was especially strident in his opposition to government censorship, and used the magazine to highlight the cases of those who had been convicted of obscenity-related charges. Editorials were also written in support of the American Civil Liberties Union, and in opposition to capital punishment.

Mizer also used photo captions to expound on political topics, sometimes comprising multiple paragraphs.

== In popular culture ==
Issues of Physique Pictorial are shown among other physique magazines as examples of publications allegedly intended to entice children into homosexuality in Perversion for Profit, a 1965 anti-gay propaganda film.

The 1998 docudrama film Beefcake tells the story of Bob Mizer, Physique Pictorial, and models featured in the magazine.

== Copyright status ==
Mizer did not include copyright notices in issues published between 1951 and the late 1970s, likely because the contents would have been deemed obscene by the U.S. Copyright Office. Because of this, issues published before 1978 that lacked copyright notices as required by U.S. copyright law at the time, immediately entered the public domain when published.
