= Beefcake (film) =

- DVD release cover
- Directed by: Thom Fitzgerald
- Written by: Thom Fitzgerald
- Produced by: Shandi Mitchell; Thom Fitzgerald
- Starring: Daniel MacIvor; Carroll Godsman; J. Griffin Mazeika; Jonathan Torrens; Josh Peace; Jack LaLanne; Joe Dallesandro
- Cinematography: Tom Harting
- Edited by: Susan Shanks
- Music by: John Wesley Chisholm; Michael Diabo; John Roby
- Release date: 1999
- Running time: 97 min.
- Countries: Canada; United Kingdom; France
- Language: English
- Box office: $276,259

Beefcake (1999) is a docudrama homage to the muscle magazines of the 1940s, 1950s, and 1960s—in particular, Physique Pictorial magazine, published quarterly by Bob Mizer of the Athletic Model Guild. It was inspired by a picture book by F. Valentine Hooven III (published by Taschen) and was directed by Thom Fitzgerald.

The film stars Daniel MacIvor, Carroll Godsman, Jack Griffin Mazieka, Jonathan Torrens, and Joshua Peace in pastiche recreations of life at the Athletic Model Guild, mixed with interviews with models and photographers whose work actually appeared in the early magazines, including Jack LaLanne and Joe Dallesandro. The film was shot in Nova Scotia.

Beefcake was a follow-up to The Hanging Garden, also produced by Thom Fitzgerald.

Beefcake premiered at the Sundance Film Festival in 1999 and was released by Strand Releasing in the United States; it was nominated for three Genie Awards.

== Synopsis ==
The film looks at buff and muscular men of the 1950s in magazines and the repetitive industry that was popular in the health and fitness magazines but were primarily being purchased by homosexual men and underground homosexual communities. The person behind the literature was Bob Mizer, who "maintained a magazine and developed sexually explicit men's films for over 40 years." By the end of the film, a courtroom drama scene is shot as Mizer attempting to run a male-prostitute ring in the early '60s. Clips of Mizer's actual films are included in Beefcake.

== Cast ==
- Daniel MacIvor as Bob Mizer
- Joshua Peace as Neil E. O'Hara
- Jack Griffin Mazeika as Red
- Carroll Godsman as Delia Mizer
- Jonathan Torrens as David
- Thomas Cawood as Mizer's Attorney
- Jaime Robertson as Prosecuting Attorney
- Dick Sircom as Judge
- Thom Fitzgerald as LaFleur's Attorney
- Orest Ulan as Defence (as Orest E Ulan)
- Glen Deveau as Soldier Just Off the Bus
- Andrew Miller as Tiny
- Marla McLean as Cabaret Singer
- Daniel McLaren as AMG Model
- Bernard Robichaud as Jukie
- Marc St. Onge as Drug Addict
- Steve MacLaughlin as LaFleur
- Andy Smith as Arthur Bob
- James Mac Swain as Mr. Summers (Max of Hollywood)
- Michael Weir as AMG Model
- Marc Le Blanc as AMG Model
- Timothy Phillips as Bob Mizer (age 12)
- Jonathan Langlois-Sadubin as Neil's Brother
- Lucy Decoutere as Champ's Wife
- Sarah Dunsworth as Blonde Kitten

== Themes ==
As examined in the Ottawa Citizen, "this odd and colourful mix of interviews, dramatizations, re-creations and naughty homoerotic hanky-panky is made in the style-reflects-content story of Bob Mizer (played by Daniel MacIvor), the man who practically invented the 1950s idea of using muscle magazines to sell sex disguised as athleticism." Although the magazine that Mizer ran (Athletic Model Guide) took a liking to homosexual men, "who could disguise their interest as a fascination with physical culture", it ended up that the magazine additionally grabbed the attention of many young women as well.

== Reception ==
Dan Brown of the National Post claims the film is "the gay equivalent of every opening of every James Bond film ever made." He claims that there has been some pushback on the themes of the films such as the repetition of everyone leading a double life in the film. Viewers bring up questions such as "was everybody in that town leading a double life? Between the closeted homosexuals, the secret communists, the Jews with Anglicized names and the confidential drug addicts, filmmaker after filmmaker has portrayed the City of Angels as a place where everybody has something to hide."

Beefcake explores new themes of male nudity that has never been explored in film before, whereas female nudity has been part of art and film history for decades. Such an increase in nudity within the film is something dramatically different than the typical theme of a movie in the 1960s. Matt Radz of The Gazette explains that "but beefcake demonstrate, in a very graphic manner, plenty of other reasons why in the race to bare all, male nudity has always finished a very distant second." Ftizgerald puts much nudity into "Beefcake" and is a central theme of the film. Radz claims "Beefcake puts so many genitals on display, the title of that promising debut movie could be also used to describe this sophomore effort". Many film critics have had disappointment in the film which is a follow up of the Hanging Garden that is "one of the few memorable movies made in Canada in this decade (1990s)."

== Awards and nominations ==
- Winner for "Best Performance by an Actor in a Supporting Role" at the Atlantic Film Festival (1998) was Jonathan Torrens
- Winner for "Art Direction" was awarded to Alan MacLeod and D'Arcy Poultney in 1997
- Nominee at the Genie Awards in 2000 for: "Best Achievement in Editing," "Best Music Score," and "Best Original Song"
- Nominee at the Verzaubert - International Gay & Lesbian Film Festival in 1999 for "Best Film"
