= Monday Magazine =

Canadian free arts and entertainment magazine

- Type: Alternative monthly
- Owner: Black Press
- Founder: Gene Miller
- Founded: 1975
- Language: English
- Headquarters: 818 Broughton Street; Victoria, British Columbia; V8W 1E4
- Website: mondaymag.com

Monday Magazine is a free arts and entertainment magazine in Victoria, British Columbia, Canada. Contrary to what the name suggests, Monday was distributed throughout the greater Victoria area every Thursday until July 2013 when it became an arts calendar monthly. The publication features articles on art, food and entertainment in Victoria but is most widely used as an event listing.

== History ==
Monday was founded in 1975 by Gene Miller, a native New Yorker who arrived in Victoria in 1970, five years before founding Monday. Miller aspired to create a publication for the Victoria readership that was rooted in the social consciousness of the Village Voice but written in the style of The New Yorker.

Shortly after establishing the paper, Miller was joined by Andrew Lynch and George Heffelfinger and the three divided ownership equally. In 1988, Miller—disheartened with his creation—sold his one-third interest to Lynch and Heffelfinger. Andrew Lynch continued in his role as publisher of Monday until it was taken over by David Black's Island Publishers Ltd. in 1996. It is currently published by Black Press.

Humorist John Duffie, a longtime columnist for the magazine in the 1970s and 1980s, was hailed as the magazine's most popular writer in his era. In 1982 he published Duffie's Unimportance of Being Earnest, a collection of his Monday Magazine columns which was shortlisted for the Stephen Leacock Memorial Medal for Humour in 1983.

Until May 1, 2013, Monday Magazine earned its reputation as a critical voice in Victoria's political, social and cultural communities. It is no longer a member of the Association of Alternative Newsweeklies. The paper targets educated, active adults and currently reaches approximately 38,445 households.

Monday routinely received awards for investigative features on the environment, social and political justice, arts, culture and the outdoors. In 2011 and 2012, its staff earned 20 newspaper awards through the BCYCNA, CCNA and AAN organizations. Monday Magazine historically tended to the left of the political spectrum and was often critical of centre and right wing politicians and policies at the city and provincial levels.

After May 1, 2013, Black Press decided to eliminate the political, environmental and edgy material, cancelling Dan Savage's sex column and other controversial material, choosing instead to target upper-middle-class readers. It now features restaurant reviews, interior design articles and middle-of-the-road concert reviews.

On August 1, 2020, the Victoria City Council announced that they will look at eliminating downtown newspaper boxes, including those for Monday Magazine, citing the need for the sidewalk space for outdoor patios. CHEK News covered the issue with one citizen saying (at 7:18), "We don't use the Monday Magazine anymore, and there's a lot of trashy boxes."

== See also ==
- List of magazines in Canada
