= Athletic Model Guild =

American physique photography studio

- Company type: Private
- Industry: Male nude photography
- Founded: Los Angeles (1945)
- Headquarters: El Cerrito, California, US
- Products: Homoerotic photography, Films and Publications

The Athletic Model Guild, or AMG, was a physique photography studio founded by Bob Mizer in December 1945. During those post-war years, United States censorship laws allowed women, but not men, to appear in various states of undress in what were referred to as "art photographs". Mizer began his business by taking pictures of men that he knew. His subjects would often pose for pictures which illustrated fitness tips and the like, but were also viewed as homoerotic material.

== History ==
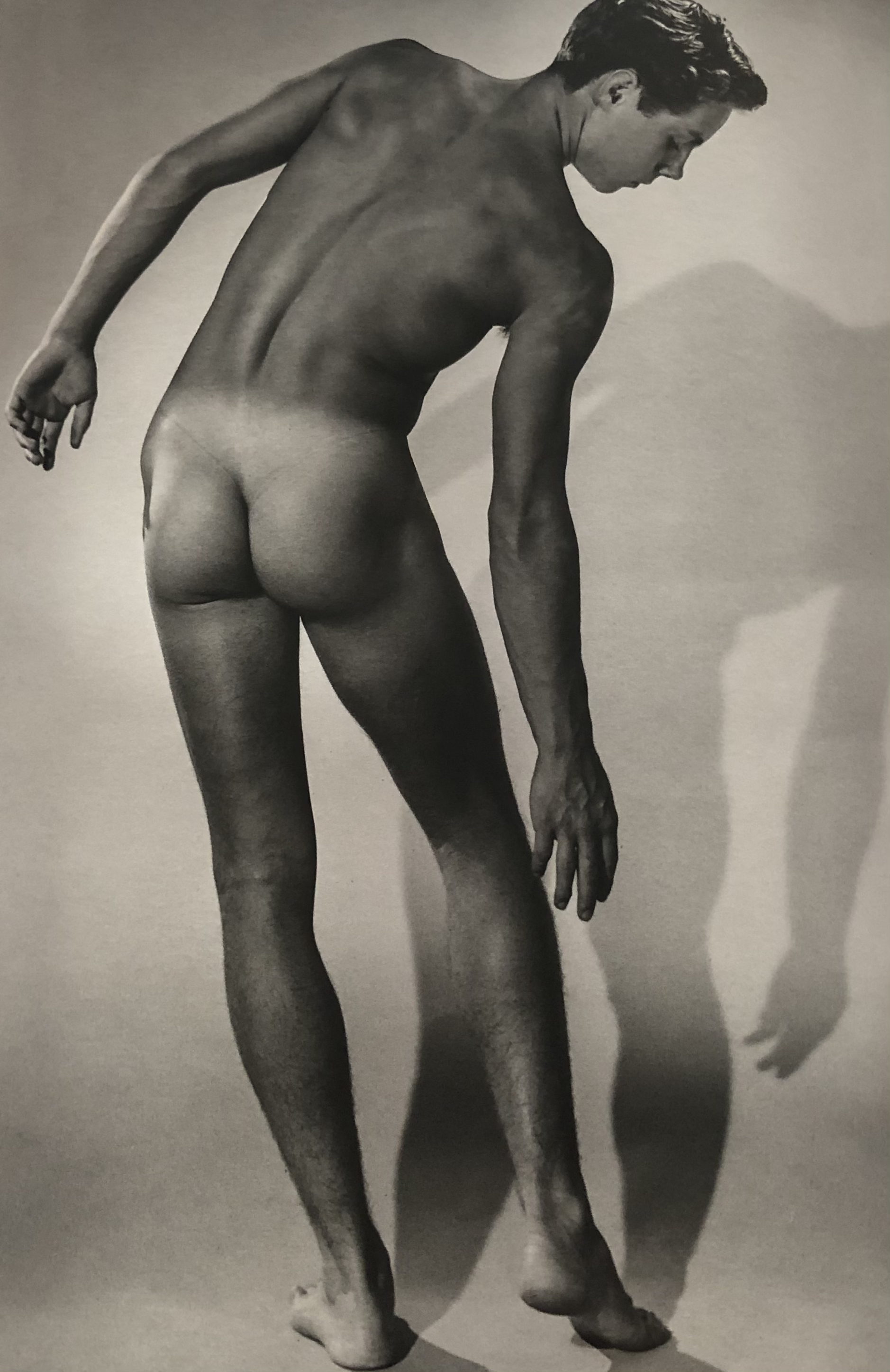
AMG model Jim Grant in 1949

Mizer established the Guild in December 1945 after spending the earlier part of the year taking photographs at Venice Beach and the offices were based around his life-long home. The formula used by AMG consisted of images (moving and still) of hunky young men doing bodybuilding poses, or perhaps wrestling in pairs or acting out improvised scenes. Mizer did appear in court to face several charges over the years, including obscenity, drug use, and prostitution. Allegedly, Mizer's AMG models would sometimes earn extra money renting themselves out as gay for pay hustlers, but Mizer argued vigorously that it was not his business what they did on their own time. Despite some legal setbacks, AMG survived its many trials.

The AMG material (sold in the form of photographic prints, magazines, and short films) slowly evolved over time, from altered images where the male genitalia were painted over or otherwise covered, to photographic prints where the models wore extremely skimpy posing straps, and then finally, as the changing laws allowed, to full nudity. He used his quarterly magazine, Physique Pictorial which featured other artists such as Tom of Finland and MATT, as means of advertising his material. Several bodybuilders and actors of the day got their start posing for Mizer and his friends at AMG. It is estimated that he shot over 10,000 men throughout the course of his career. Andy Warhol's protégé Joe Dallesandro was one of the many AMG models that even those not acquainted with Athletic Model Guild might be familiar with. Others included Ed Fury and Glenn Corbett of 77 Sunset Strip, and Susan Hayward and Alan Ladd. Bodybuilder and future Governor of California, Arnold Schwarzenegger posed for AMG under Mizer in 1975.

Editorials in Physique Pictorial claimed that AMG had 35,000 photographs in its library by 1957. Two years later, the figure had risen to 50,000.

After Mizer's death in May 1992, Wayne Stanley, a friend and legal advisor, tended to his archives. In 2004 the company and its archives were sold to physique photographer Dennis Bell. Under Bell's reins, Athletic Model Guild continues to operate as Bob Mizer Foundation. The 1998 movie Beefcake, directed by Thom Fitzgerald, combines documentary footage with fictionalized dramatizations in an attempt to tell the story of Mizer and AMG.

In 2016, Taschen published a book featuring one thousand of the Guild's models, a reprint of a 1957 publication of the same name.

== See also ==
- David Hurles
- Physique Pictorial
