= LGBTQ history in the United States =

Sexuality in the United States

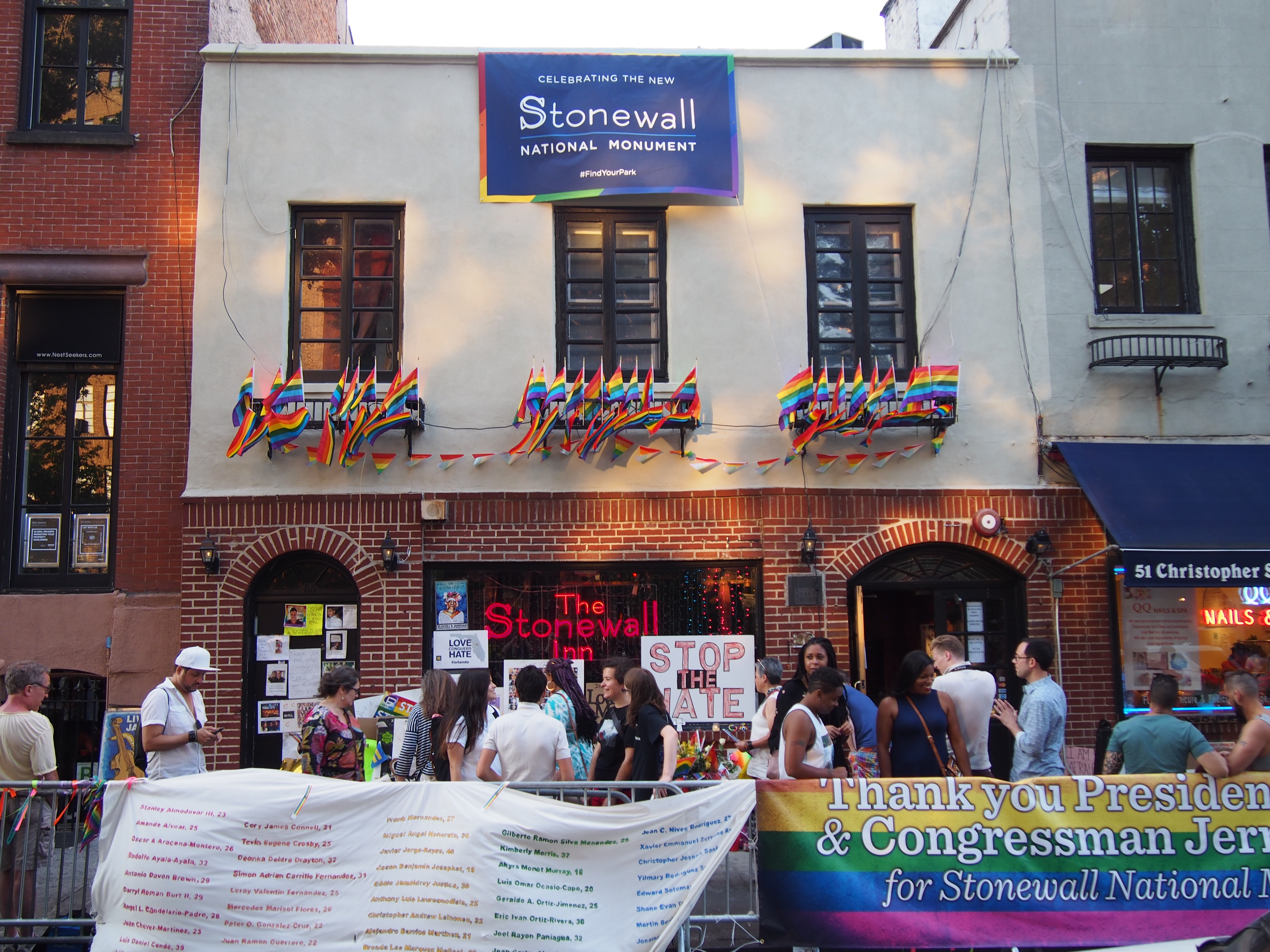
The Stonewall Inn in Greenwich Village, Manhattan, site of the June 28, 1969 Stonewall riots, the cradle of the modern LGBT rights movement, is adorned with rainbow pride flags in 2016.

United States pride flag

The history of lesbian, gay, bisexual, transgender and queer (LGBTQ) people in the United States spans from pre-colonial times to the present and includes the LGBTQ social movements they have built.

Until the 20th century, it was uncommon for LGBTQ individuals to live open lives due to persecution and social ostracism. The nation's Protestant roots led to a heteronormative culture, reinforced through sodomy laws, often falsely attributed to Puritans. These laws began when King Henry VIII established himself as head of the Church of England. With this came The Buggery Act 1533. Before this, while the Catholic Church was known to prosecute sodomites from time to time, sodomy was considered a church issue secular courts had little interest in.

This stigma forced most LGBTQ people to live in the closet. LGBTQ life before the mid-20th century, especially that of lesbians, is mostly preserved through personal writings.

The process of decriminalizing sodomy began in 1962 with the repeal of Illinois's anti-sodomy statute. This process continued until 2003, when Lawrence v. Texas ruled the 14 remaining anti-sodomy statutes unconstitutional. In 1973, the American Psychiatric Association declassified homosexuality as a mental disorder.

In the mid-20th century, gay men and lesbians began organizing movements to advocate for their rights. As the century went on, bisexual and transgender individuals gained visibility and the GLBT acronym was formed. Key social advances of the 20th and 21st centuries included the decriminalization of homosexuality, the creation of domestic partnerships, anti-discrimination legislation at the state and local levels, advocacy for HIV/AIDS patients, and the legalization of gay marriage.

== Colonial Era ==
=== Indigenous America ===
Based on the scholarship of Jonathan Ned Katz, the oldest existing record of LGBTQ individuals in North America dates to the 1542 book "La Relación" ("The Account") by Spanish explorer Alvar Núñez Cabeza de Vaca. While relaying his experience living with the Karankawa people somewhere off the coast of the Atlantic Plain from 1527–1534, Cabeza de Vaca described "...a man married to another man. These are womanish, impotent men who cover their bodies like women and do women's tasks."

Cabeza de Vaca's account is perhaps the earliest written record of the gender diversity in Native American communities, most of which did not adhere to a strict binary system. Classes of people who existed outside the gender binary were recorded in over 150 indigenous nations, including the Cherokee, Chumash, Pueblo, Navajo, Kutenai and Choctaw. This class had many names across different Native American communities and languages, but a popular contemporary term is two-spirit.

=== Protestant Reformation ===
British anti-sodomy laws began when King Henry VIII created The Buggery Act 1533, which meant a death penalty and confiscation of property for those convicted of buggery/sodomy. Sodomy at the time had a broader definition, including bestiality, masturbation, and heterosexual anal intercourse.

The new civil sodomy laws were primarily used to confiscate property from monasteries and weaken the Catholic Church's influence in England. Approximately 180 monks and nuns confessed to sodomy (believed to primarily be confessions of masturbation).

Henry's successors, Edward VI and Lady Jane Grey, kept the Buggery Act but the next monarch, Mary I, believed matters of sodomy to be a church issue and repealed these laws in her first year of rule. They were reinstated by Queen Elizabeth. Her own successor, King James (Mary Queen of Scots' son and believed to be homosexual himself) did not repeat Queen Mary of England's actions by repealing the sodomy laws. They remained in place as British colonization began with the establishment of Jamestown in 1607. This brought sodomy law with its death penalty to America. Subsequent British colonies repeated this pattern.

Colonies in the early 1600s were established with Christian norms. These norms included the traditional heterosexual family structure with a man and a woman.

Edward Coke was appointed by King James I, and his interpretation of sodomy laws would be a heavy influence upon American colonies. He made distinction between buggery (Sodomitae men with man or beast) and pederasty (Paederasts/Pecorantes – men with boy), the latter he considered a "species" of buggery which Lumbards (Italians) brought to England. What constituted sodomy as a crime he determined respective to heterosexual rape laws ("emissio seminis without penetration maketh no rape"): sodomy was only a crime if penetration occurred. In such an event, both parties involved (regardless of consent) were guilty, though he called for boys under 14 not be punished.

The only colony to not fully codify the death penalty for sodomy was Quaker Pennsylvania. White men would be imprisoned; Black men (both enslaved and free) could still risk execution.

However, prosecutions rarely happened and when they did, the death penalty was rarely enforced. Documented executions for sodomy began in 1624 with Richard Cornish, a member of the Virginia Colony, who assaulted an indentured servant.

After America was founded in 1776, the death penalty in each colony/state was slowly replaced with imprisonment. The laws themselves, however, would not be abolished for another 200 years.

=== Jamestown ===
Jamestown was established in 1607. The early years of Jamestown were harsh and marked by starvation. John Smith's diaries indicate some men exchanged "love" for food, with a footnote of "sailor's abuses." Sodomy laws were established in 1610, though mostly ignored.

Jamestown was notably heavily male dominated, which would persist for several decades. Such situations have been known to prompt "situational sexuality," which makes studies of identity-based sexuality complicated.

In 1629, a controversy arose when Thomas/Thomasine Hall, a "maidservant," was caught in bed with another woman and word spread that they were really a man. Homosexual fornication was a crime under Jamestown law, and this would have meant prosecution. However, Hall was intersex, had lived as both a man and woman, and identified as both. After multiple inspections of Hall's genitals, the court gave up trying to classify Hall, who was sentenced to wear men's clothing with women's accessories.

=== Maryland ===
Maryland was founded in 1634. Similar to Jamestown, it suffered a disproportionate male population. Many formed households of "mates," or mateships, where groups of two or more men would live in the same house and share work/property claims. Romantic mateships may have existed in such circumstances. "Historians John D'Emilio and Estelle Freeman have argued that the Chesapeake region's early gender imbalance led to a looser policing of sexual norms and most likely led to a certain level of acceptance of male-male sexual liaisons"

=== Puritans ===
Much of what we know of Puritans' approach to homosexuality comes from:

- Sodomy laws vs actual sodomy prosecutions
- Sermons
- The trial of Nicolas Sension – a man who paid and pressed male servants and young men into sleeping with him for 30 years
- The diary of Reverend Michael Wigglesworth – a minister and teacher at Harvard who struggled with his love/lust for men

Separatists arrived in Plymouth in 1620, followed by Puritans in Salem (1625) and Boston (1626). In the beginning, Puritans defaulted to British law, but eventually created their own sodomy laws with citation to Leviticus: Plymouth in 1636, Massachusetts Bay Colony in 1641, and New Haven in 1642.

Puritans showed a certain "tolerance" to homosexuality, which historians have struggled to explain. The same sodomy laws applied to bestiality, which brought extremely harsh punishment, including several executions. One explanation for this tolerance was they cared far more about threats to community peace than to sexual morality. Another is that Puritans strictly defined sodomy as penetration, accusations required at least two witnesses (which were hard to get), and false accusations of a capital crime could risk its own punishment.

For men who faced homosexual sodomy accusations, the death penalty was often avoided in favor of warnings or whippings unless children were involved. The only two men executed for sodomy were New Haven's John Knight, who assaulted a 14-year-old boy and (previously) a 14-year-old girl, and William Plaine, who "had corrupted a great part of the youth of Guilford by masturbations...above a hundred times."

Beginning in 1648, Massachusetts Bay updated its sodomy laws to absolve boys under 14 and victims of assault, and Plymouth followed suit in 1671. In other colonies, like New Netherlands, such people could still risk punishment.

The first (documented) conviction for lesbian behavior in America took place in 1649 with the prosecution of Sarah White Norman and Mary Vincent Hammon. Sarah Norman was required to publicly apologize; Mary Vincent received no punishment, as it is believed that she was only 15 years old at the time.

=== Aftermath of Puritans ===
Puritans held the usual bigotries of their time and place. However, they were unique among Christian communities for placing a heavy value in education and having a willingness to abandon traditions in pursuit of moral good. This began to result in diversity and conflicts in biblical interpretation, which led Puritanism to fracture into presbyterians, congregational branches, and sects for what is now Unitarian Universalism. These would eventually become some of the most LGBTQ-affirming Christian denominations in the US.

== Revolutionary Era ==
In 1771, Josiah Quincy Jr. and John Adams were opposing attorneys in an assault and battery case, John Gray vs Lendall/Lindall Pitts. Pitts began to flirt with a woman (either John Gray or a friend), whom he greatly liked. He later discovered this woman was a "cross-dressing man." He reacted with hostility and struck Gray's head, causing serious injury. Gray sued Pitts £300 ($66,000 in 2025) for physical damage. They were rewarded £5 ($1,100), raised to £18 ($4,000). Cross-dressing was illegal under Massachusetts law, but Gray (or the friend) suffered no repercussions, and the judge seems to have ignored this.

In 1776, Public Universal Friend (also known as The Friend) suffered an illness, after which they claimed to be reborn and began to live a genderless life. They preached throughout New England, and soon acquired a following, called "The Society of Universal Friends".

== 19th century ==
=== Webster's Dictionary ===
Noah Webster published the original Webster's American Dictionary of the English Language in 1828. He included several LGBT terms in his book; focusing on terms for gay sexual practices and ignoring lesbian sexual practices: bugger, buggery, pathic, pederast, pederastic, pederasty, sodomy, and sodomite. He occasionally cited the King James Version. For example, Webster cited First Epistle to the Corinthians VI to define the homosexual context of the term abuser. Another citation is the Book of Genesis 18 to associate the term cry to the Sodom and Gomorrah. One of the first public advocates for gay rights in America was the Presbyterian pastor Carl Schlegel.

=== Civil War ===
Retired physician Thomas P. Lowry cites letters and notes from soldiers during the Civil War noting stories of men "lying with men" in bed. Lowry's analysis of primary sources documents sexual practices throughout the era, and notes that sexuality was more fluid than previously noted. He underlines that the nature of fragmentary sources makes definitive conclusions hard, but notes two dismissals in the Navy for homosexual behavior.

Additionally, researchers at the National Archives found evidence of 250 women serving as men, although few continued to live on as men after the war. One such example is Albert Cashier, who was assigned female at birth, served as man during the Civil War, and lived as one after, until his death. He received a male veteran pension for the rest of his life. Cashier's sex was eventually discovered, but he kept his pension thanks to public pressure from his former comrades. The word "transgender," however, did not exist, according to the Oxford English Dictionary, making identification of LGBTQ soldiers complex.

=== Old West ===
The presence of homosexual and transgender people has been noted throughout the history of the American Frontier. The mutualistic nature of relationships between cowboys and the lack of women that worked with them facilitated the development of romantic and sexual relations between male cowboys. Such relationships manifested, for example, in stag parties where men would dance with another male dance partner with a patch over his crotch to signal his role as the "woman" in the relationship. These relationships were largely tolerated due to the scarcity of labor in the West until such work became increasingly mechanized.

=== Uranian poetry ===
The United States saw the rise of its own Uranian poetry after the Uranian ("Urnings") movement began to rise in the Western world. Walt Whitman denied his homosexuality in a letter after asked outright about his sexual orientation by John Addington Symonds. Bayard Taylor wrote Joseph and His Friend: A Story of Pennsylvania in 1870. Archibald Clavering Gunter wrote a lesbian story in 1896 that would serve as the basis for the 1914 film, "A Florida Enchantment."

=== Historical Figures ===
American presidents James Buchanan and his successor, Abraham Lincoln, were suspected of being homosexual. The sexuality of Abraham Lincoln has been considered for over a century. Perhaps the best evidence to connect Lincoln and homosexuality is a poem that he wrote in his youth that reads: "But Billy has married a boy".

Nineteenth-century Vermont residents Charity Bryant and Sylvia Drake were documented by Rachel Hope Cleves in her 2014 book Charity and Sylvia: A Same-Sex Marriage in Early America.

Susan Lee Johnson included the story of John Chaffee and Jason Chamberlain, a California couple who were together for more than 50 years until Chaffee's death in 1903, in her 2000 book Roaring Camp: The Social World of the California Gold Rush.

Around 1890, former acting First Lady Rose Cleveland started a lesbian relationship with Evangeline Marrs Simpson, with explicit erotic correspondence. This cooled when Evangeline married Henry Benjamin Whipple, but after his death in 1901 the two rekindled their relationship and in 1910 they moved to Italy together.

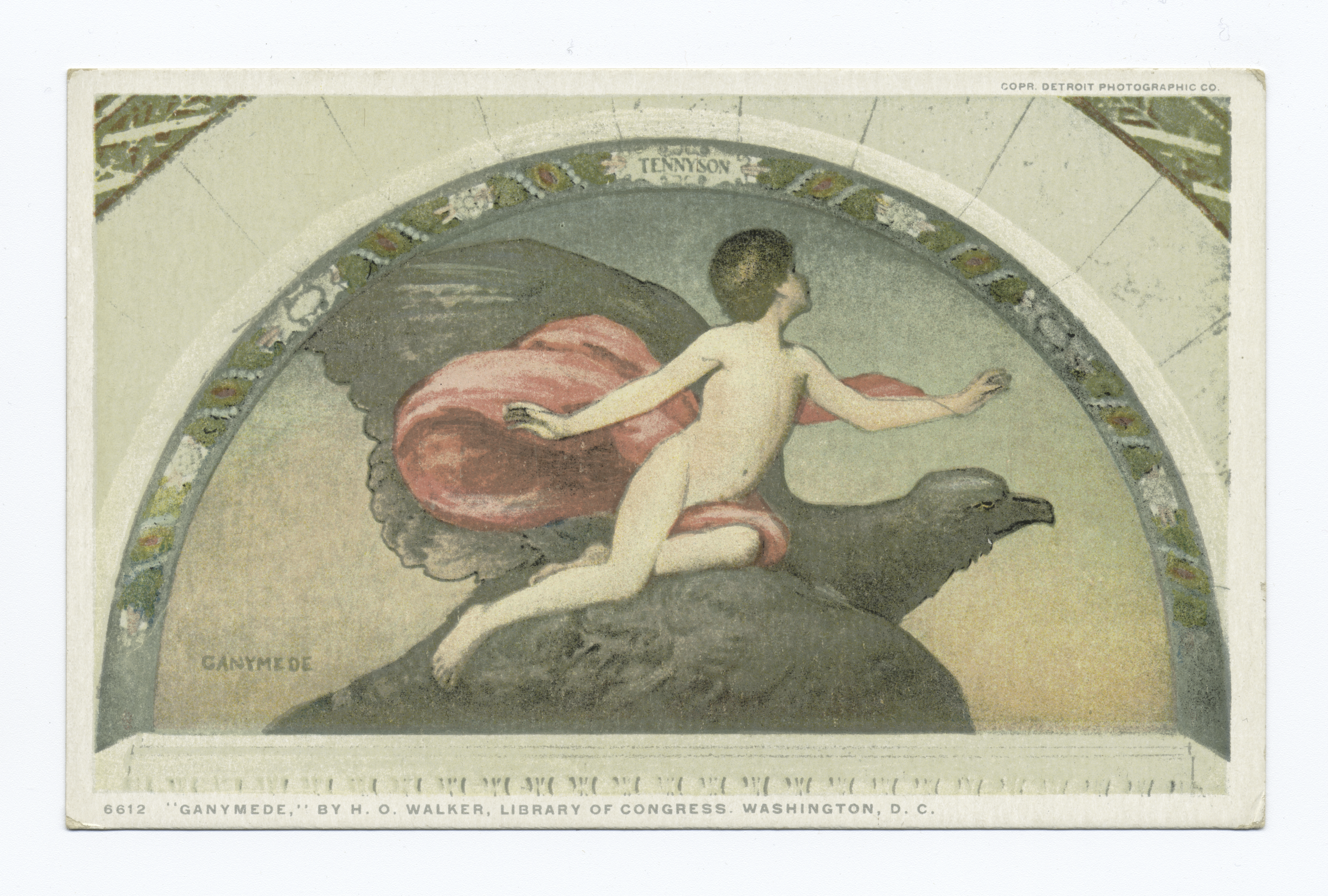
Ganymede by Henry Oliver Walker, ca. 1898, Library of Congress, Washington, D.C.

Henry Oliver Walker was commissioned in 1898 to paint a mural in the Library of Congress. What the eccentric artist painted was shocking to pious sympathies: a mural of the catamite Ganymede with Zeus in the depiction of an eagle, which was derived from Greek mythology.

William Dorsey Swann was the first person to describe himself as a drag queen. Swann was the first American on record who pursued legal and political action to defend the LGBTQ community's right to assemble. During the 1880s and 1890s, Swann organized a series of drag balls in Washington, D.C. Swann was arrested in police raids numerous times, including in the first documented case of arrests for female impersonation in the United States on April 12, 1888.

=== Legislation ===
Restrictions against loitering and solicitation of sex in public places were installed in the late 19th century by many states (namely to target, among other things, solicitation for same-sex sexual favors), and increasingly tighter restrictions upon "perverts" were common by the turn of the century. Sodomy laws in the United States were enacted separately over the course of four centuries and varied state by state.

== 1900–1969 ==
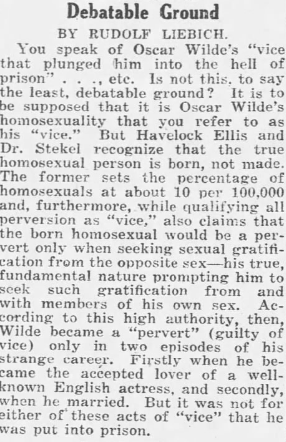
"Debatable Ground": a letter criticizing homophobia published in the Haldeman-Julius Weekly of Girard, Kansas, January 5, 1924.

=== Early LGBT rights organizations ===
In the United States, as early as the turn of the 20th century, several groups worked in hiding to avoid persecution and to advance the rights of homosexuals, but little is known about them. Edward Irenaeus Prime-Stevenson published Imre: A Memorandum in 1906 and The Intersexes in 1908. A better documented group is Henry Gerber's Society for Human Rights (formed in Chicago in 1924), which was quickly suppressed within months of its establishment. Serving as an enlisted man in occupied Germany after World War I, Gerber had learned of Magnus Hirschfeld's pioneering work. Upon returning to the U.S. and settling in Chicago, Gerber organized the first documented public homosexual organization in America and published two issues of the first gay publication, entitled Friendship and Freedom. Meanwhile, during the 1920s, LGBT persons found employment as entertainers or entertainment assistants for various urban venues in cities such as New York City.

=== 1920s media ===
Homosexuals were occasionally seen in Pre-Code Hollywood films. Buster Keaton's Seven Chances offered a rare joke about the female impersonator, Julian Eltinge. The Pansy Craze offered actors, such as Gene Malin, Ray Bourbon, Billy De Wolfe, Joe Besser, and Karyl Norman. The craze found itself in a wide variety of American films, from gangster films like The Public Enemy, to musicals like Wonder Bar and animated cartoons like Dizzy Red Riding Hood. Homosexuals also managed to take part in the then-illegal pornographic film industry.

Around 1929, The Surprise of a Knight became the first American gay pornographic film. A Stiff Game would be the second American gay pornographic film.

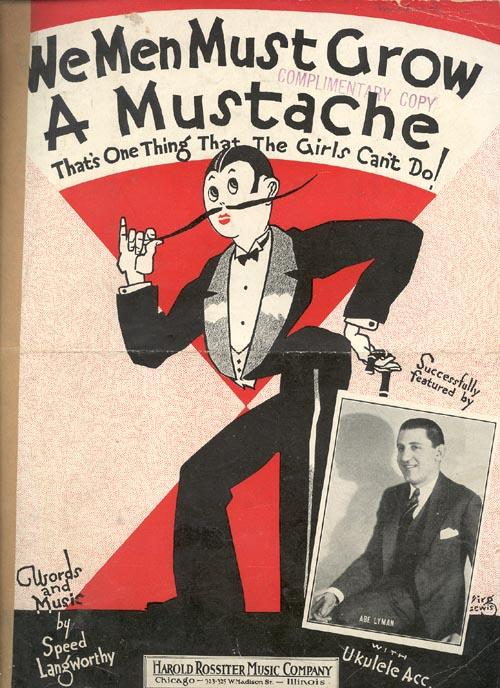
We Men Must Grow a Mustache by Speed Langworthy, 1922.

Homosexuality was also present in the music industry. In 1922, Norval Bertrand Langworthy (better known as Speed Langworthy) (b. May 15, 1901, Seward, Nebraska – d. March 22, 1999, Arizona) wrote the song We Men Must Grow a Mustache; Abe Lyman appeared on the sheet music. Edgar Leslie and James V. Monaco wrote Masculine Women, Feminine Men for Hugh J. Ward's 1926 production of the musical Lady Be Good. Homosexuality also found its way into African-American music. Ma Rainey, who is believed to have been a lesbian, recorded the song Prove it on Me Blues. According to pbs.org, the song is about her arrest for group sex, in which alleged lesbianism occurred. George Hannah decided in 1930 to record the song The Boy in the Boat." Kokomo Arnold recorded the song "Sissy Man Blues" in 1935. Pinewood Tom (Josh White), George Noble, and Connie McLean's Rhythm Boys followed with their own records.

While it seems that homosexuals enjoyed greater recognition in the media after World War I, many were still arrested and convicted through state sodomy laws. For example, Eva Kotchever headed a lesbian café called Eve's Hangout in Greenwich Village. It was stated about her business that "men are admitted but not welcome." Kotchever's indiscretion was so reckless that she wrote about lesbianism in her book, Lesbian Love. In 1926, the New York City Police Department raided her club, and Kotchever was arrested on an obscenity charge and deported to her native Poland. Kotchever, who was Jewish, would eventually fall victim to the Holocaust in Auschwitz.

=== Homophile Movement ===
During the late 1940s through the 1960s, a handful of radio and television news programs aired episodes that focused on homosexuality, with some television movies and network series episodes featuring gay characters or themes. The homophile movement began in the 1950s and 60s with the creation of several organizations, including the Mattachine Society, the Daughters of Bilitis and the Society for Individual Rights.

In 1948, Sexual Behavior in the Human Male was published by Alfred Kinsey, a work which was one of the first to look scientifically at the subject of sexuality. Kinsey claimed that approximately 10% of the adult male population (and about half that number among females) were predominantly or exclusively homosexual for at least three years of their lives.

In 1958, the United States Supreme Court ruled that the gay publication ONE, Inc., was not obscene and thus protected by the First Amendment. The California Supreme Court extended similar protection to Kenneth Anger's homoerotic film, Fireworks and Illinois became the first state to decriminalize sodomy between consenting adults in private.

Little change in the laws or mores of society was seen until the mid-1960s, when the sexual revolution began. Gay pulp fiction and Lesbian pulp fiction ushered in a new era. The physique movement also emerged with Mr. America. Athletic Model Guild produced much of the homoerotic content that proceeded the gay pornography business. This was a time of major social upheaval in many social areas, including views of gender roles and human sexuality.

=== Lavender Scare ===
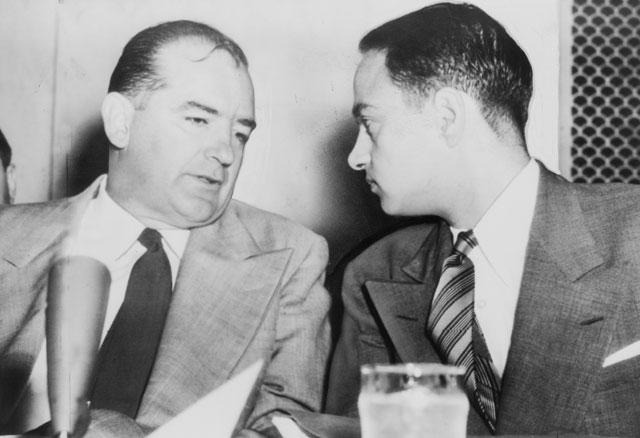
Joseph McCarthy and Roy Cohn during the Army–McCarthy hearings

The Lavender Scare was a moral panic about homosexual people in the United States government which led to their mass dismissal from government service during the mid-20th century. It contributed to and paralleled the anti-communist campaign which is known as McCarthyism and the Second Red Scare. Gay men and lesbians were said to be national security risks and communist sympathizers, which led to the call to remove them from state employment. It was also thought that due to the stigma around homosexuality, gay people were vulnerable to blackmail, which could lead to a breach in national security. Lesbians were at less risk of persecution than gay men, but some lesbians were interrogated or lost their jobs. The focus on persecuting homosexuals in state employment, through McCarthyism and the Second Red Scare, led to more alleged homosexuals being persecuted than alleged communists during the campaign.

The Lavender Scare normalized persecution of homosexuals through bureaucratic institutionalization of homophobia. Former U.S. senator Alan K. Simpson wrote: "The so-called 'Red Scare' has been the main focus of most historians of that period of time. A lesser-known element and one that harmed far more people was the witch-hunt McCarthy and others conducted against homosexuals."

=== Compton's Cafeteria riot ===
The Compton's Cafeteria riot occurred in August 1966 in the Tenderloin district of San Francisco. The riot was a response to the violent and constant police harassment of trans people, particularly trans women, and drag queens. The incident was one of the first LGBTQ-related riots in United States history, preceding the more famous 1969 Stonewall riots in New York City by three years. It marked the beginning of transgender activism in San Francisco.

The 1960s was a pivotal period for sexual, gender, and ethnic minorities, as social movements championing civil rights and sexual liberation came to fruition. Additionally, the 1950s created the foundation for the trans rights and gay liberation movements with the earlier Homophile movement. Though Stonewall is often heralded as the beginning of the trans rights movement, the Compton's Cafeteria Riots and the homophile movement came first. Social groups helped mobilize and even churches, like Glide Memorial Methodist Church in San Francisco, began reaching out to the transgender community. Nevertheless, many police officers resisted these movements and the increasing visibility of these groups, continuing to harass and abuse transgender people. This simultaneous rise in support for transgender rights on the one side and the unwillingness to accept these new ideas on the other created the strain that fueled the riot at Compton's Cafeteria in the summer of 1966. The incident began when a transgender woman resisted arrest by throwing coffee at a police officer. It was followed by drag queens and transgender women pouring into the streets, fighting back with their high heels and heavy bags.

== 1969–1999 ==
=== Stonewall riots ===
The Stonewall riots (also known as the Stonewall uprising, Stonewall rebellion, Stonewall revolution, or simply Stonewall) were a series of spontaneous riots and demonstrations against a police raid that took place in the early morning of June 28, 1969, at the Stonewall Inn, in the Greenwich Village neighborhood of Lower Manhattan in New York City, U.S. Although the demonstrations were not the first time American LGBTQ people fought back against government-sponsored persecution of sexual minorities, the Stonewall riots marked a new beginning for the gay rights movement in the United States and around the world.

American gays and lesbians in the 1950s and 1960s faced a legal system more anti-homosexual than those of some other Western and Eastern countries. (Note: Except for Illinois, which decriminalized sodomy in 1961, homosexual acts, even between consenting adults acting in private homes, were a criminal offense in every U.S. state at the time the Stonewall riots occurred: "An adult convicted of the crime of having sex with another consenting adult in the privacy of his or her home could get anywhere from a light fine to five, ten, or twenty years—or even life—in prison. In 1971, twenty states had 'sex psychopath' laws that permitted the detaining of homosexuals for that reason alone. In Pennsylvania and California sex offenders could be committed to a psychiatric institution for life, and [in] seven states they could be castrated." (Carter, p. 15) Castration, emetics, hypnosis, electroshock therapy and lobotomies were used by psychiatrists to attempt to cure homosexuals through the 1950s and 1960s.(Katz, pp. 181–197.)(Adam, p. 60.)) Early homophile groups in the U.S. sought to prove that gay people could be assimilated into society, and they favored non-confrontational education for homosexuals and heterosexuals alike. The last years of the 1960s, however, were very contentious, as many social movements were active, including the civil rights movement, the counterculture of the 1960s, and antiwar demonstrations. These influences, along with the liberal environment of Greenwich Village, served as catalysts for the Stonewall riots.

Very few establishments welcomed openly gay people in the 1950s and 1960s. Those that did were often bars, although bar owners and managers were rarely gay. The Stonewall Inn was owned by the Mafia and catered to an assortment of patrons. It was popular among the poorest and most marginalized people in the gay community: drag queens, representatives of the transgender community, effeminate young men, hustlers, and homeless youth. Police raids on gay bars were routine in the 1960s, but, in contrast to what was typical for raids at the time, the Mafia was not alerted by police prior to their arrival, nor was the NYPD's sixth precinct. Beyond this, raids typically occurred on weeknights in the early evening, when bar crowds were expected to be small. The Stonewall raid, in contrast, was to take place late on a Friday night, when crowd sizes were expected to be at their highest. Officers quickly lost control of the situation at the Stonewall Inn and attracted a crowd that was incited to riot. Tensions between New York City police and gay residents of Greenwich Village erupted into more protests the next evening and again several nights later. Within weeks, Village residents quickly organized into activist groups to concentrate efforts on establishing places for gay people to be open about their sexual orientation without fear of being arrested.

=== Gay Liberation ===
In the late 1960s, "liberation" philosophy had started to create different factions within the Civil Rights Movement, Black Power movement, anti-war movement, and feminist movement, and also engulfed the homophile movement. A new generation of young gay and lesbian Americans saw their struggle within a broader movement to dismantle racism, sexism, western imperialism, and traditional mores regarding drugs and sexuality. This new perspective on Gay Liberation had a major turning point with the Stonewall riots in 1969.

New gay liberation organizations were created, such as the Gay Liberation Front (GLF) in New York City and the Gay Activists Alliance (GAA). In keeping with the mass frustration of LGBT people, and the adoption of the socialistic philosophies that were being propagated in the late 1960s–1970s, these new organizations engaged in colorful and outrageous street theater. The GLF published "A Gay Manifesto," which was influenced by Paul Goodman's work titled "The Politics of Being Queer" (1969).

The group Dyketactics was the first LGBT group in the U.S. to take the police to court for police brutality in the case Dyketactics vs. The City of Philadelphia. Members of Dyketactics who took the police to court, now known as "The Dyketactics Six," were beaten by the Philadelphia Civil Defence Squad in a demonstration for LGBT rights on December 4, 1975.

Late in 1979, a new religious revival among conservative Evangelical Protestants and Roman Catholics ushered in the Republican coalition politically aligned with the Christian right that would reign in the United States between the years 1970s and 1980s, becoming another obstacle for the progress of the LGBTQ rights movement. During the HIV/AIDS epidemic of the 1980s, LGBTQ communities were further stigmatized as they became the focus of mass hysteria, suffered isolation and marginalization, and were targeted with extreme acts of violence.

The gay liberation movement spread to countries worldwide and heavily influenced many of the modern LGBT rights organizations. Out of this vein, several modern-day advocacy organizations were established with differing approaches: the Human Rights Campaign, formed in 1980, follows a more middle-class-oriented and reformist tradition, while other organizations such as the National Gay and Lesbian Task Force (NGLTF), formed in 1973, tries to be grassroots-oriented and support local and state groups to create change from the ground up.

=== Gay migration ===
In the 1970s, many gay people moved to cities such as San Francisco. Harvey Milk, a gay man, was elected to the city's Board of Supervisors, a legislative chamber often known as a city council in other municipalities. Milk was assassinated in 1978 along with the city's mayor, George Moscone. The White Night Riot on May 21, 1979, was a reaction to the manslaughter conviction and sentence given to the assassin, Dan White, which were thought to be too lenient. Milk played an important role in the gay migration and the gay rights movement.

The first national gay rights march in the United States took place on October 14, 1979, in Washington, D.C., involving perhaps as many as 100,000 people.

Historian William A. Percy considers that a third epoch of the gay rights movement began in the early 1980s, when AIDS received the highest priority and decimated its leaders, and lasted until 1998, when advanced antiretroviral therapy greatly extended the life expectancy of those with AIDS in developed countries. It was during this era that direct action groups such as ACT UP were formed.

=== Decriminalization of sexual activity ===
In 1962 Illinois was the first state in the United States to decriminalize private consensual sexual activity in same-sex couples. Although decriminalization of sexual relations was an important step, it was insufficient to guarantee full equality in other areas of life such as a right to life without discrimination.

Over the next several decades, laws prohibiting homosexual acts were repealed on a state-by-state basis. Connecticut was the next state to decriminalize homosexuality. Colorado, Oregon, Delaware, and Hawaii had decriminalized homosexuality by 1973. Ohio, Massachusetts, North Dakota, New Mexico, New Hampshire, California, West Virginia, Iowa, Maine, Indiana, South Dakota, Wyoming, Nebraska, Washington, New York decriminalized homosexuality in the 1970s; in the 1980s, Pennsylvania and Wisconsin followed suit.

In 1990 Mica England sued the Dallas Police Department for discrimination in The City of Dallas and Mack Vines/Mica England v. Mica England/The State of Texas. In 1994 the department changed its hiring policy. This had a statewide effect on state government employment. The Mica England Lawsuit also overturned the Homosexual Conduct Law in 34 counties in the First District Court of Appeal and the Third District Court of Appeal. A late appeal by the Dallas city Attorney at the State Supreme Court level prevented the Supreme Court from ruling for the whole state of Texas. Otherwise, the 21.06 statute would have been overturned statewide. The Mica England case is referred to and is used for discovery in current discrimination lawsuits.

In the 1990s, Kentucky, Nevada, Tennessee, Montana, Rhode Island also decriminalized homosexuality.

In 2003, the Supreme Court decriminalized homosexuality in Lawrence v. Texas, overturning laws in Alabama, Florida, Idaho, Kansas, Louisiana, Michigan, Mississippi, Missouri, North Carolina, Oklahoma, South Carolina, Texas, Utah, and Virginia.

=== "Don't ask, don't tell" and DOMA ===
The long-standing prohibition of gays serving openly in the United States military was reinforced under "Don't ask, don't tell" (DADT), a 1993 Congressional policy that allowed for homosexual people to serve in the military provided that they did not disclose their sexual orientation. The Defense of Marriage Act (DOMA) of 1996 barred the federal government from recognizing same-sex couples in any legal manner.

== 21st century ==
The tipping point of activism in favor of same-sex marriage came in 2008 when the California State Supreme Court ruled that the previous proposition which barred the legalization of same-sex marriage in California was unconstitutional under the United States Constitution. Over 18,000 couples then obtained legal licenses from May until November of the same year, when another statewide proposition reinstated the ban on same-sex marriage. This was received by nationwide protests against the ban and several legal battles which were projected to end up in the Supreme Court of the United States.

In the late 2000s and early 2010s, attention was also paid to the rise of suicides and the lack of self-esteem by LGBT children and teenagers due to homophobic bullying. The "It Gets Better Project", founded and promoted by Dan Savage, was launched to counter the phenomenon, and various initiatives were taken by both activists and politicians to impose better conditions for LGBT students in public schools.

=== Same-sex marriage ===
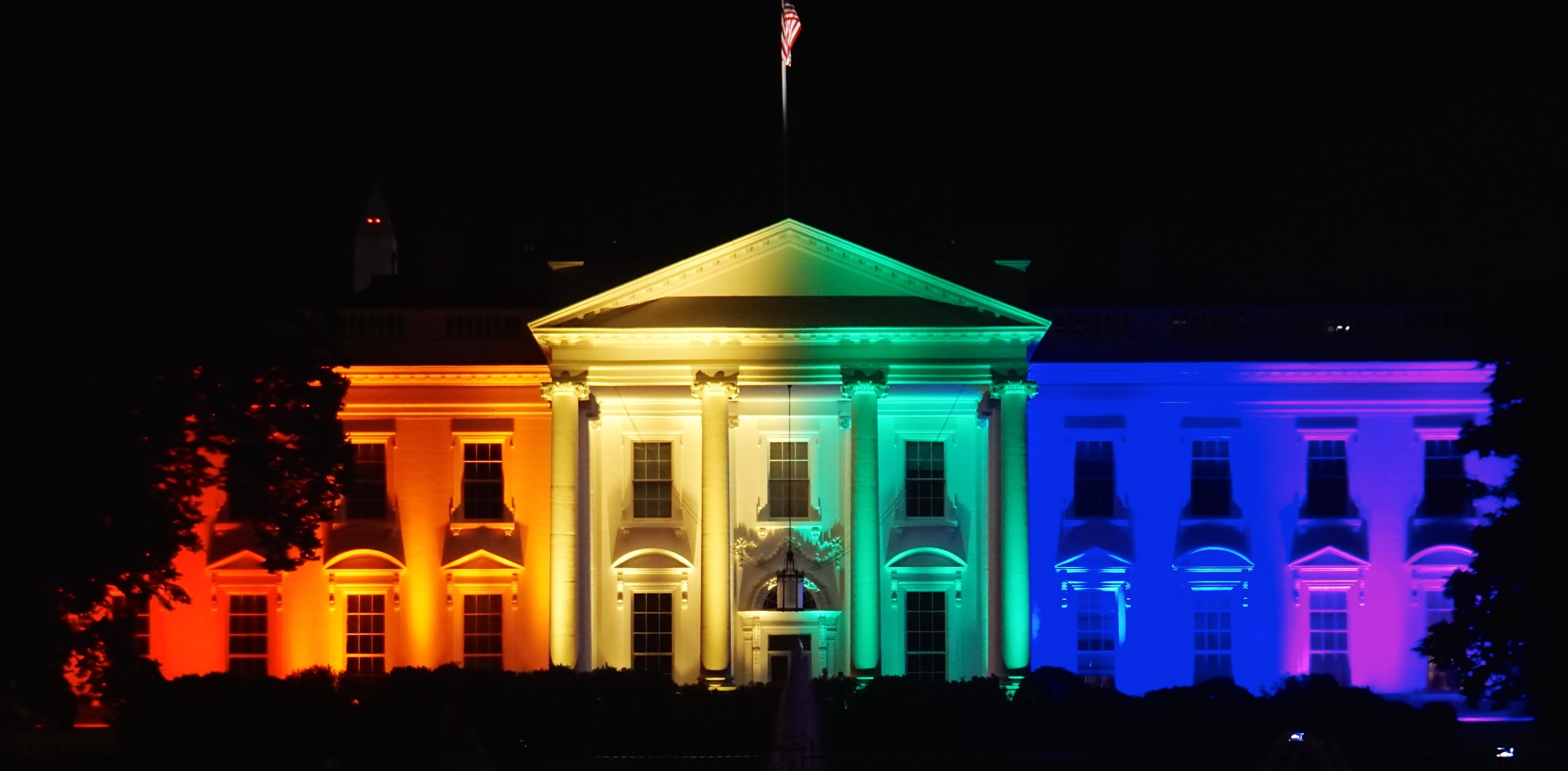
The White House after the ruling in the case of Obergefell v. Hodges on the night of June 26, 2015.

The first legal same-sex marriage ceremony in the United States happened on February 12, 2004 between Del Martin and Phyllis Lyon, when mayor of San Francisco Gavin Newsom ordered city hall to issue marriage licenses to same-sex couples. This decision resulted in the celebration of the first gay marriage in the United States, when Martin and Lyon became the first gay couple to tie the knot and get official recognition of their fifty year relationship (Marriage Equality New York).

On May 17, 2004, Massachusetts became the first U.S. state and the sixth jurisdiction in the world to legalize same-sex marriage following the Supreme Judicial Court's decision in Goodridge v. Department of Public Health six months earlier. Just as with the Hawaii decision, the legalization of same-sex marriage in Massachusetts provoked a reaction from opponents of same-sex marriage that resulted in further legal restrictions being written into state statutes and constitutions. On August 4, 2004, a Washington court ruled for the plaintiffs in a suit challenging that state's defense of marriage act. King County Superior Court Judge William L. Downing became the first trial judge in the nation to rule that a state law prohibiting same-sex marriages, or DOMA, was unconstitutional; the ruling was narrowly overturned on appeal in 2006. The movement to obtain marriage rights for same-sex couples expanded steadily from that time until in late 2014 lawsuits had been brought in every state that still denied marriage licenses to same-sex couples.

By late 2014, same-sex marriage had become legal in states that contained more than 70% of the United States population. In some jurisdictions legalization came through the action of state courts or the enactment of state legislation. More frequently it came as the result of the decisions of federal courts. On November 6, 2012, Maine, Maryland, and Washington became the first states to legalize same-sex marriage through popular vote. Same-sex marriage has been legalized in the District of Columbia and 21 Native American tribal nations as well.

The June 2013 decision of the U.S. Supreme Court in United States v. Windsor striking down the law barring federal recognition of same-sex marriage gave significant impetus to the progress of lawsuits that challenged state bans on same-sex marriage in federal court. Since that decision, with only a few exceptions, U.S. District Courts and Courts of Appeals have found state bans on same-sex marriage unconstitutional, as have several state courts. The exceptions have been a state court in Tennessee, U.S. district courts in Louisiana and Puerto Rico, and the U.S. Court of Appeals for the Sixth Circuit. The U.S. Supreme Court agreed to hear appeals from that circuit's decision.

On June 26, 2015, the U.S. Supreme Court struck down all state bans on same-sex marriage, legalized it in all fifty states, and required states to honor out-of-state same-sex marriage licenses in the case Obergefell v. Hodges.

=== Presidency of Barack Obama ===
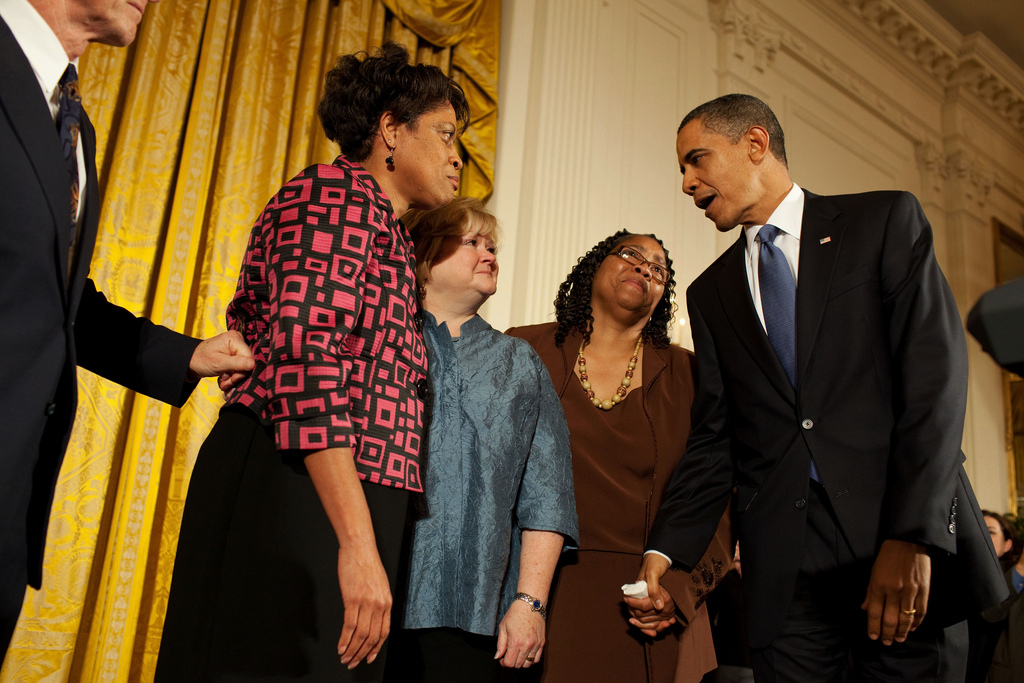
President Barack Obama greets Louvon Harris, left, Betty Byrd Boatner, right, both sisters of James Byrd Jr., and Judy Shepard at a reception commemorating the enactment of the Matthew Shepard and James Byrd Jr. Hate Crimes Prevention Act.

President Barack Obama took many definitive pro-LGBT rights stances. In 2009, his administration reversed Bush administration policy and signed the U.N. declaration that calls for the decriminalization of homosexuality. In June 2009, Obama became the first president to declare the month of June to be LGBT pride month; President Clinton had declared June Gay and Lesbian Pride Month. Obama did so again in June 2010, June 2011, June 2012, June 2013, June 2014, and June 2015.

=== 2005 ===
On June 19, 2005, the first East-Central Minnesota Pride celebration was held in Pine City, Minnesota. Organizers and historians have described the gathering as the first known rural Pride event in the United States.

=== 2009 ===
On June 17, 2009, President Obama signed a presidential memorandum allowing same-sex partners of federal employees to receive certain benefits. The memorandum does not cover full health coverage. On October 28, 2009, Obama signed the Matthew Shepard and James Byrd Jr. Hate Crimes Prevention Act, which added gender, sexual orientation, gender identity, and disability to the federal hate crimes law.

In October 2009, he nominated Sharon Lubinski to become the first openly lesbian U.S. marshal to serve the Minnesota district.

=== 2010 ===
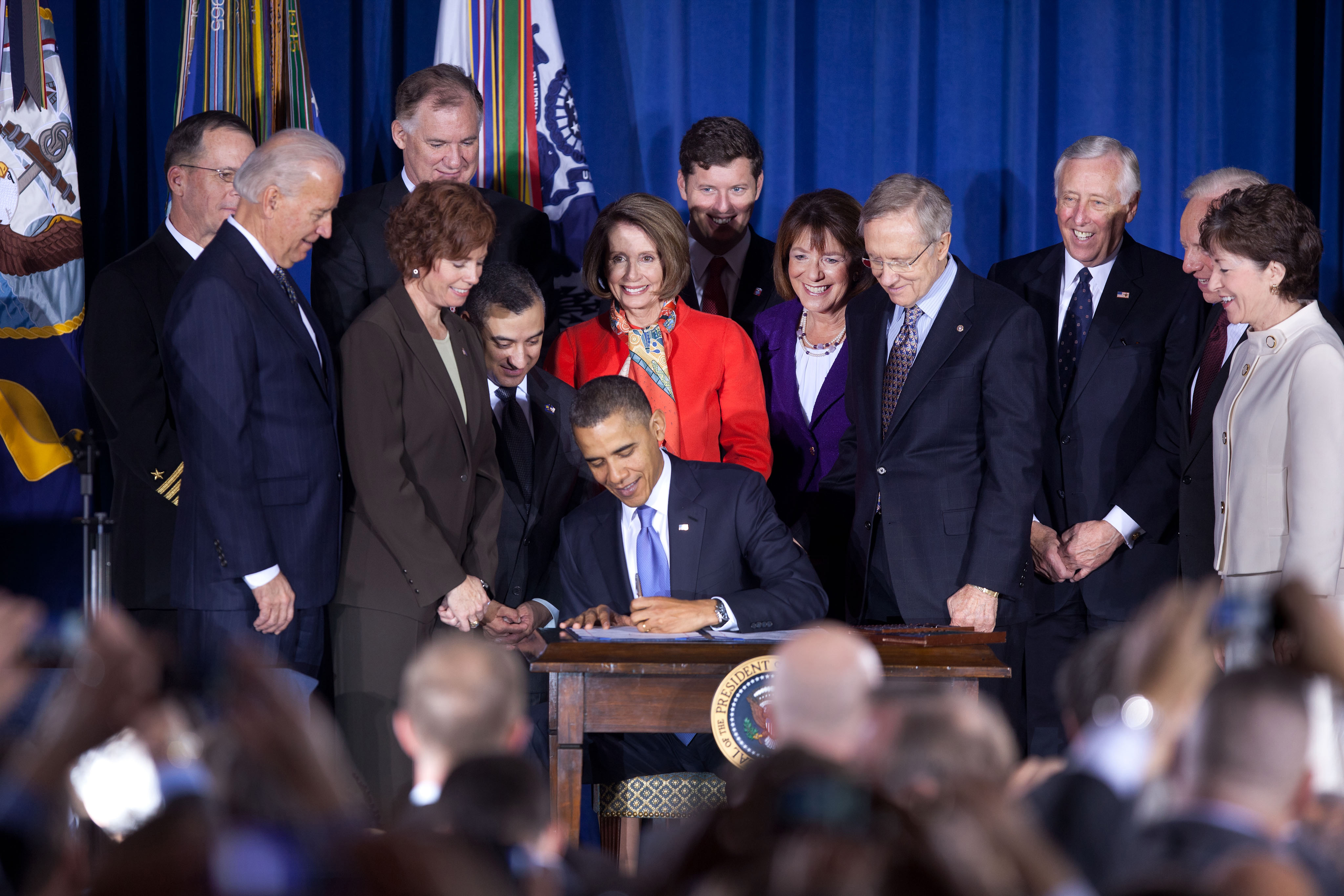
Obama signs the Don't Ask, Don't Tell Repeal Act of 2010.

On January 4, 2010, he appointed Amanda Simpson the Senior Technical Advisor to the Department of Commerce, making her the first openly transgender person appointed to a government post by a U.S. president. He had appointed the most U.S. gay and lesbian officials of any U.S. president, at the time.

At the start of 2010, the Obama administration included gender identity among the classes protected against discrimination under the authority of the Equal Employment Opportunity Commission (EEOC). On April 15, 2010, Obama issued an executive order to the Department of Health and Human Services that required medical facilities to grant visitation and medical decision-making rights to same-sex couples. In June 2010, he expanded the Family Medical Leave Act to cover employees taking unpaid leave to care for the children of same-sex partners. On December 22, 2010, Obama signed the Don't Ask, Don't Tell Repeal Act of 2010 into law.

=== 2011 ===
On February 23, 2011, President Obama instructed the Justice Department to stop defending the Defense of Marriage Act in court.

In March 2011, the U.S. issued a nonbinding declaration in favor of gay rights that gained the support of more than 80 countries at the U.N. In June 2011, the U.N. endorsed the rights of gay, lesbian, and transgender people for the first time, by passing a resolution that was backed by the U.S., among other countries.

On August 18, 2011, the Obama administration announced that it would suspend deportation proceedings against many undocumented immigrants who pose no threat to national security or public safety, with the White House interpreting the term "family" to include partners of lesbian, gay and bisexual people.

On September 30, 2011, the Defense Department issued new guidelines that allow military chaplains to officiate at same-sex weddings, on or off military installations, in states where such weddings are allowed.

On December 5, 2011, the Obama administration announced the United States would use all the tools of American diplomacy, including the potent enticement of foreign aid, to promote LGBT rights around the world.

=== 2012 ===
In March and April 2012, Obama expressed his opposition to state constitutional bans on same-sex marriage in North Carolina, and Minnesota.

On May 3, 2012, the Federal Bureau of Prisons agreed to add an LGBT representative to the diversity program at each of the 120 prisons it operates in the United States.

On May 9, 2012, Obama publicly supported same-sex marriage, the first sitting U.S. president to do so. Obama told an interviewer that:

Over the course of several years as I have talked to friends and family and neighbors when I think about members of my own staff who are in incredibly committed monogamous relationships, same-sex relationships, who are raising kids together, when I think about those soldiers or airmen or Marines or sailors who are out there fighting on my behalf and yet feel constrained, even now that Don't Ask Don't Tell is gone, because they are not able to commit themselves in a marriage, at a certain point I've just concluded that for me personally it is important for me to go ahead and affirm that I think same sex couples should be able to get married.

In the 2012 election, Obama received the endorsement of the following gay rights organizations: Equal Rights Washington, Fair Wisconsin, Gay-Straight Alliance, Human Rights Campaign, and the National Stonewall Democrats. The American Civil Liberties Union (ACLU) gave Obama a score of 100% on the issue of gays and lesbians in the US military and a score of 75% on the issue of freedom to marry for gay people.

=== 2013 ===
On January 7, 2013, the Pentagon agreed to pay full separation pay to service members discharged under "Don't Ask, Don't Tell."

Obama also called for full equality during his second inaugural address on January 21, 2013: "Our journey is not complete until our gay brothers and sisters are treated like anyone else under the law—for if we are truly created equal, then surely the love we commit to one another must be equal as well." It was the first mention of rights for gays and lesbians or use of the word gay in an inaugural address.

On March 1, 2013, Obama, speaking about Hollingsworth v. Perry, the U.S. Supreme Court case about Proposition 8, said "When the Supreme Court asks do you think that the California law, which doesn't provide any rationale for discriminating against same-sex couples other than just the notion that, well, they're same-sex couples—if the Supreme Court asks me or my attorney general or solicitor general, 'Do we think that meets constitutional muster?' I felt it was important for us to answer that question honestly. And the answer is no." The administration took the position that the Supreme Court should apply "heightened scrutiny" to California's ban—a standard under which legal experts say no state ban could survive.

On June 26, 2013, The Supreme Court invalidated The Defense of Marriage Act (DOMA), which prohibited federal recognition of same-sex marriages, in United States v. Windsor.

On August 7, 2013, Obama criticized Russia's anti-gay law.

On December 26, 2013, President Obama signed the National Defense Authorization Act for Fiscal Year 2014 into law, which repealed the ban on consensual sodomy in the UCMJ.

=== 2014 ===
On February 16, 2014, Obama criticized Uganda's anti-gay law.

On February 28, 2014, Obama agreed with Governor Jan Brewer's veto of SB 1062.

Obama included openly gay athletes in the February 2014 Olympic delegation, namely Brian Boitano and Billie Jean King (who was replaced by Caitlin Cahow, who was also openly gay.) This was done in criticism of Russia's anti-gay law.

On July 21, 2014, President Obama signed Executive Order 13672, adding "gender identity" to the categories protected against discrimination in hiring in the federal civilian workforce and both "sexual orientation" and "gender identity" to the categories protected against discrimination in hiring and employment on the part of federal government contractors and sub-contractors.

Obama was also criticized for meeting with the anti-gay Ugandan president Yoweri Museveni at a dinner with African heads of state in August 2014.

Later in August 2014 Obama made a surprise video appearance at the opening ceremony of the 2014 Gay Games.

=== 2015 ===
On February 10, 2015, David Axelrod's Believer: My Forty Years in Politics was published. In the book, Axelrod revealed that President Barack Obama lied about his opposition to same-sex marriage for religious reasons in the 2008 United States presidential election. "I'm just not very good at bullshitting," Obama told Axelrod, after an event where he stated his opposition to same-sex marriage, according to the book.

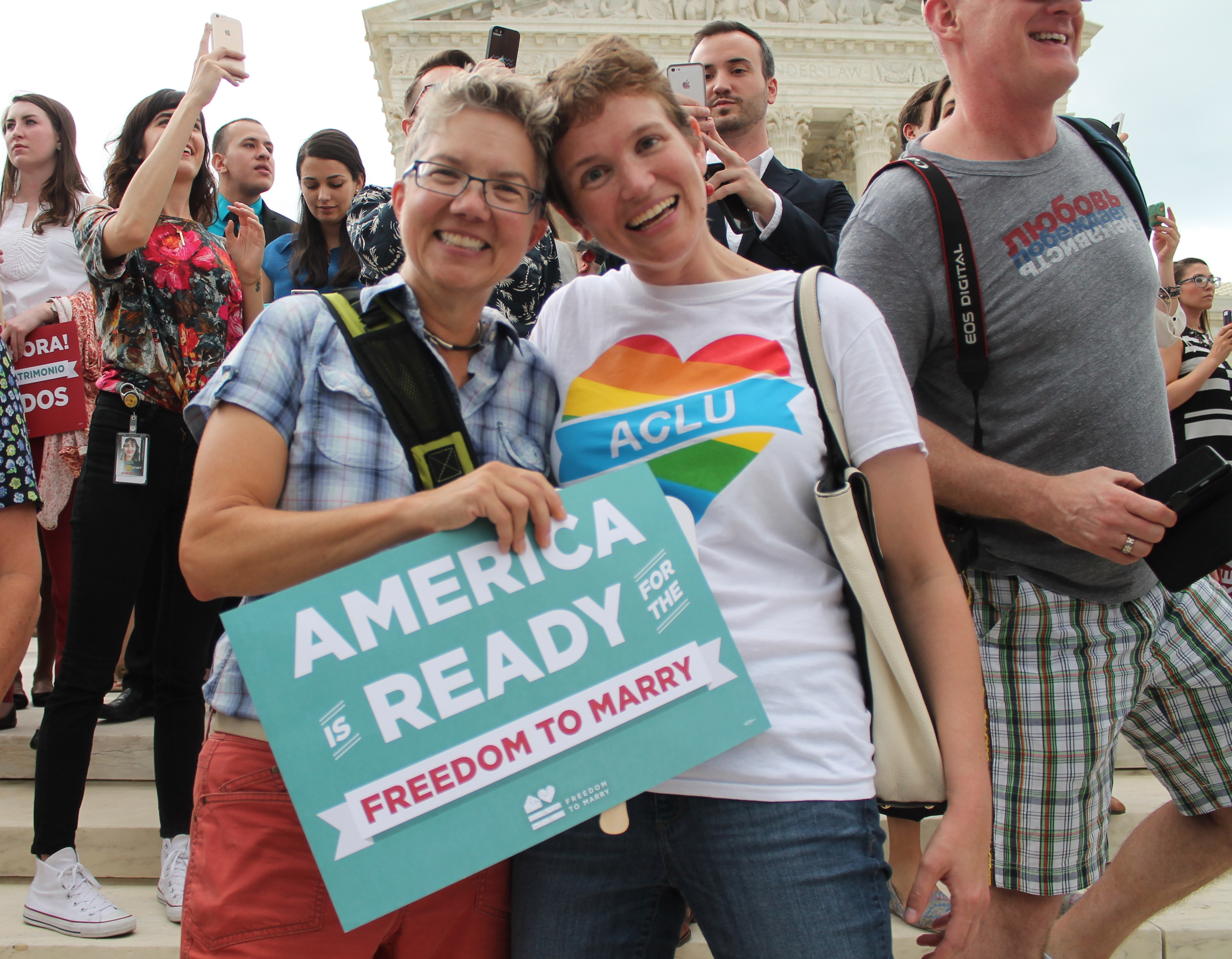
Couple celebrating decision in front of the US Supreme Court on June 26, 2015

On June 26, 2015, the U.S. Supreme Court struck down all state bans on same-sex marriage, legalized it in all fifty states, and required states to honor out-of-state same-sex marriage licenses in the case Obergefell v. Hodges.

In 2015 the United States appointed Randy Berry as its first Special Envoy for the Human Rights of LGBT Persons.

Also in 2015 the Obama administration announced it had opened a gender-neutral bathroom within the White House complex; the bathroom is in the Eisenhower Executive Office Building, next door to the West Wing.

Also in 2015, President Obama responded to a petition seeking to ban conversion therapy (inspired by the death of Leelah Alcorn) with a pledge to advocate for such a ban.

Also in 2015, when President Obama declared May to be National Foster Care Month, he included words never before included in a White House proclamation about adoption, stating in part, "With so many children waiting for loving homes, it is important to ensure all qualified caregivers have the opportunity to serve as foster or adoptive parents, regardless of race, religion, sexual orientation, gender identity, or marital status. That is why we are working to break down the barriers that exist and investing in efforts to recruit more qualified parents for children in foster care." Thus it appears he is the first president to explicitly say gender identity should not prevent anyone from adopting or becoming a foster parent.

On October 29, 2015, President Barack Obama endorsed Proposition 1. Subsequently, on November 10, 2015, President Barack Obama officially announced his support for the Equality Act of 2015.

=== 2016 ===
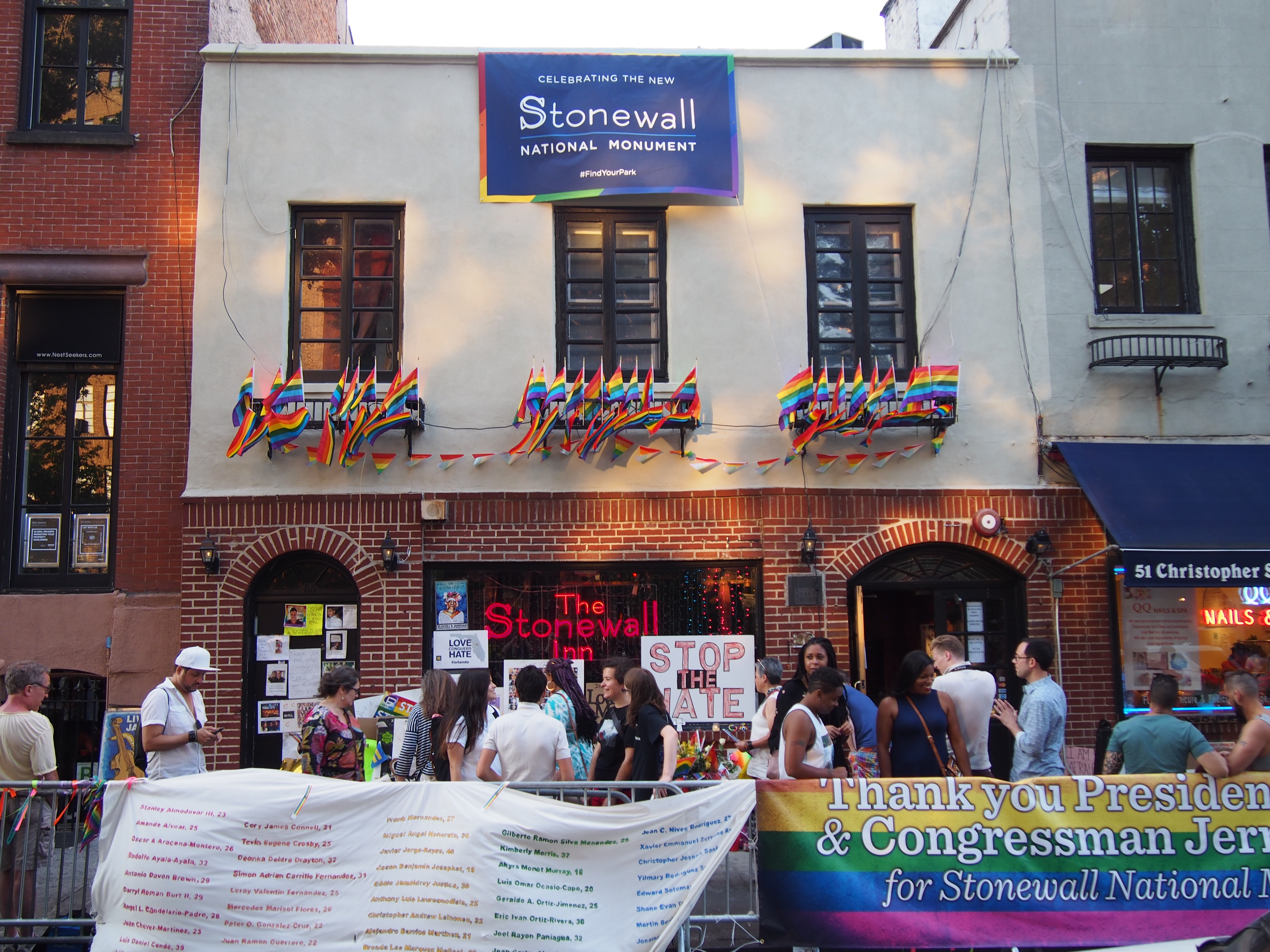
The Stonewall Inn at 53 Christopher Street in Greenwich Village, Manhattan, a designated U.S. National Historic Landmark and National Monument, as the site of the 1969 Stonewall Riots.

In June 2016, President Obama dedicated the new Stonewall National Monument in Greenwich Village, Lower Manhattan, as the first U.S. National Monument to honor the LGBT rights movement.

On October 20, President Obama endorsed Kate Brown as Governor of Oregon. On November 8, Brown, who is bisexual, became the United States' first openly LGBT person elected Governor. She has also come out as a sexual assault survivor. She assumed office in 2015 due to a resignation. During her tenure as Governor before her election, she signed legislation to ban conversion therapy on minors.

=== Pulse nightclub shooting ===
On June 12, 2016, 49 people, mostly of Latino descent, were shot and killed by Omar Mateen during Latin Night at the Pulse gay nightclub in Orlando, Florida. It was the deadliest attack against the LGBTQ community in American history and the second deadliest mass shooting in the United States. His ex-wife, Sitora Yusufiy, declared three days after the shooting that Mateen might have been hiding homosexuality from his family. Though the attack was initially assumed to be motivated by homophobia, later evidence suggests that Mateen was motivated by US airstrikes against ISIS and may not have known that Pulse was a gay nightclub.

=== Presidency of Donald Trump ===
During the 2016 Republican National Convention, following the Orlando nightclub shooting, Donald Trump said "As your president, I will do everything in my power to protect our LGBTQ citizens, from the violence and oppression of hateful foreign ideologies". At a campaign rally on October 29, 2016, Trump held up a Rainbow Flag on stage upside down marked with "LGBTs for Trump". On November 11, 2016, Trump appointed Peter Thiel to the executive committee of his presidential transition team. On November 13, 2016, during an interview with Lesley Stahl on 60 Minutes, Trump said that he was fine with the Obergefell v. Hodges Supreme Court decision and that it was irrelevant whether he supported same-sex marriage or not because the law was settled. Trump's decisions as president have put into question the sincerity of his comments as a candidate. On October 13, 2017, Trump became the first sitting president to address the Values Voter Summit, an annual conference sponsored by the Family Research Council, which is known for its anti-LGBT civil rights advocacy.

=== National LGBTQ Wall of Honor ===
The National LGBTQ Wall of Honor was inaugurated in June 2019 and is an American memorial wall in Greenwich Village, Lower Manhattan, New York City, dedicated to "LGBTQ pioneers, trailblazers, and heroes". The wall is located inside of the Stonewall Inn and is a part of the Stonewall National Monument, the first U.S. National Monument dedicated to LGBTQ rights and history. The first fifty nominees were announced in June 2019, and the wall was unveiled on June 27, 2019, as a part of the Stonewall 50 – WorldPride NYC 2019 events. Each year five additional names will be added .

=== 2020 ===
In 2020, the coronavirus pandemic in the United States led to cancellation of most pride parades across the United States during the traditional pride month of June. However, Brooklyn Liberation March, the largest transgender-rights demonstration in LGBTQ history, took place on June 14, 2020, stretching from Grand Army Plaza to Fort Greene, Brooklyn, focused on supporting Black transgender lives. It drew an estimated 15,000 to 20,000 participants.

In Bostock v. Clayton County, 590 U.S. ___ (2020),, a landmark decision, the Supreme Court ruled that Title VII of the Civil Rights Act of 1964 protects employees against discrimination on account of their sexual orientation or gender identity.

=== 2020s anti-LGBTQ movement ===
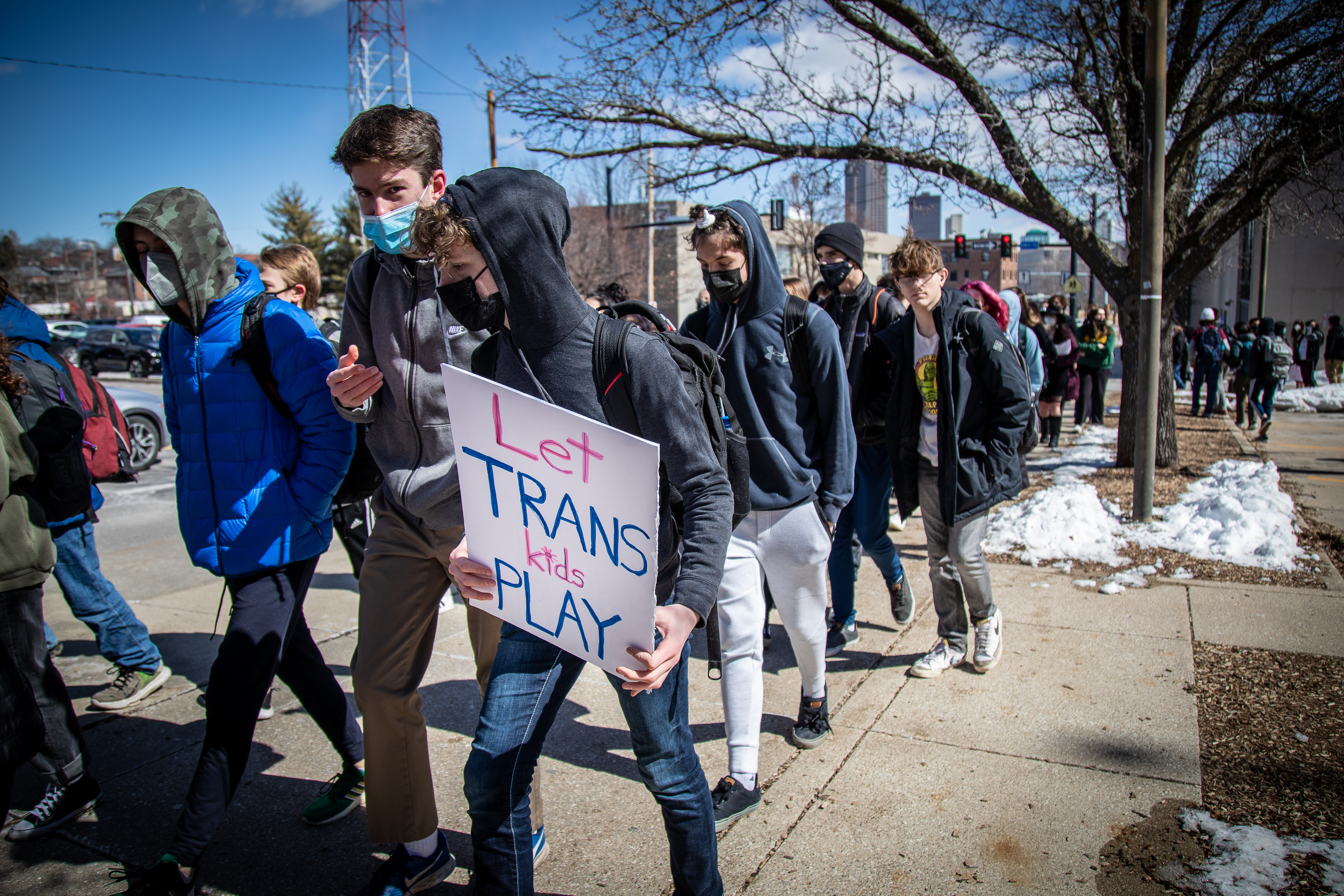
Students in Des Moines protesting an anti-trans law signed by Republican Governor Kim Reynolds in 2022.

In 2021, a significant conservative anti-LGBTQ movement began in the United States, which has largely focused on transgender issues. The movement has resulted in bathroom use restrictions, bans on gender transition, "don't say gay" laws, laws against drag performances, book bans, boycotts, and conspiracy theories around grooming. In the campaign leading up to the 2024 United States presidential election, Republicans spent over $200 million on ads related to transgender issues. The movement have also targeted rainbow capitalism, the corporate appropriation for gay symbols.

=== Presidency of Joe Biden ===
On January 20, 2021, Joe Biden took office as the 46th President of the United States. Pete Buttigieg (openly gay, a Democrat and the former Mayor of South Bend) took office as the 19th Secretary of Transportation on February 3, 2021. His nomination was confirmed on February 2, 2021, by a vote of 86–13, making him the first openly LGBT Cabinet member in U.S. history. (Note: Richard Grenell, who is also gay, was nominated Acting Director of National Intelligence by President Donald Trump in 2020; however, the Director of National Intelligence is not part of the Cabinet but rather a Cabinet-level office.) Nominated at age 38, he was also the youngest Cabinet secretary in the Biden administration and the youngest person ever to serve as Secretary of Transportation.

Biden also reversed the LGBT-targeting executive orders of his predecessor and signed Executive Order 13988, which directed all federal agencies, federal contractors and sub-contractors to review all policies which implement non-discrimination protections on the basis of sex and extend them to sexual orientation and gender identity, which extended beyond the scope of Obama's Executive Order 13672 of 2014 and Clinton's Executive Order 13087 of 1998.

=== 2022 ===
In 2022, to prevent the potential loss of the right to same-sex marriage, the United States House of Representatives passed the Respect for Marriage Act which would nullify DOMA and protect the nationwide recognition of same-sex and interracial marriages if performed legally. In July 2022, the bill passed 267–157, with 47 Republican representatives joining the Democrats. In December 2022, the United States Senate passed the bill 61–36, and the House again voted 258–169 to pass it.

The 2022 United States elections saw the largest number of openly-LGBT candidates appear on a general election ballot at 678, as well as the largest number of openly-LGBT winners of a national general election with at least 340 winning candidates. The LGBTQ Victory Fund endorsed more than 500 openly-LGBT candidates for office, the most in the organization's history.

=== 2023 ===
In the case 303 Creative LLC v. Elenis (2023), the Supreme Court ruled 6–3 that the state of Colorado cannot compel the designer to create work that violates her anti-LGBT values.

The state legislatures of Michigan and Minnesota passed anti-discrimination laws protecting sexual orientation and gender identity. In addition, the states of Minnesota and Maryland repealed their defunct sodomy laws.

=== 2025 ===
President Trump, through the power of executive orders, removed Executive Order 13988 of January 20, 2021 (Preventing and Combating Discrimination on the Basis of Gender Identity or Sexual Orientation). Alongside this, Trump has also made progress towards allowing people with negative views on LGBT individuals to adopt queer children, leading to possible Conversion Therapy scenarios.

On January 27, The Idaho House of Representatives voted for a resolution that calls for the Supreme Court to reconsider its 2015 Obergefell v. Hodges same sex marriage decision.

On March 28, Utah becomes the first US state to ban LGBTQ pride flags in government buildings and schools.

== Historiography ==
Scholars of U.S. LGBT history

- Nan Alamilla Boyd
- Michael Bronski
- Julio Capó Jr.
- Margot Canaday
- David Carter
- Eric Cervini
- George Chauncey
- John D'Emilio
- Madeline Davis
- St. Sukie de la Croix
- Jim Downs
- Martin Duberman
- Lisa Duggan
- Lillian Faderman
- Jules Gill-Peterson
- Lauren Jae Gutterman
- Chad Heap
- Emily K. Hobson
- John Howard
- John Ibson
- David K. Johnson
- Jonathan Ned Katz
- Elizabeth Lapovsky Kennedy
- James Kirchick
- Regina Kunzel
- Eithne Luibhéid
- Jen Manion
- Esther Newton
- Horacio Roque Ramírez
- Will Roscoe
- Leila Rupp
- Clare Sears
- Emily Skidmore
- Siobhan Somerville
- C. Riley Snorton
- Dean Spade
- Marc Stein
- Susan Stryker
- Stuart Timmons
- Timothy Winter-Stewart

== See also ==
- African-American LGBTQ community § History
- Biphobia
- Bisexuality in the United States
- History of gay men in the United States
- History of homosexuality in American film
- History of lesbianism in the United States
- History of transgender people in the United States
- History of LGBTQ rights under U.S. presidents
- Homophobia
- Lesbophobia
- LGBTQ demographics of the United States
- LGBTQ historic places in the United States
- LGBTQ people in the United States
- List of LGBTQ actions in the United States prior to the Stonewall riots
- Transphobia in the United States

=== History by state ===
- LGBTQ history in California
- LGBTQ history in Florida
- LGBTQ history in Hawaii
- LGBTQ history in Illinois
- LGBTQ history in Louisiana
- LGBTQ history in Michigan
- LGBTQ history in New York
- LGBTQ history in North Dakota
- LGBTQ history in South Dakota
- LGBTQ history in Texas

== Sources ==
- Carter, David (2004). Stonewall: The Riots that Sparked the Gay Revolution. St. Martin's Press. ISBN 978-0-312-34269-2.
- Duberman, Martin (1993). Stonewall. Penguin Books. ISBN 978-0-525-93602-2.
- Hoffman, Amy (2007). An Army of Ex-Lovers: My Life at the Gay Community News. University of Massachusetts Press. ISBN 978-1558496217.
- Johnson, David K. (2004). The Lavender Scare. Chicago: The University of Chicago Press. ISBN 9780226401904. OCLC 921180945.
