= Karl Schlegel =

Karl Schlegel may refer to:

- Karl Wilhelm Friedrich Schlegel (1772–1829), German poet, critic and scholar
- Karl Schlegel (aviator) (1893–1918), German World War I flying ace
- Carl Schlegel (1863-1922), German-American Presbyterian minister and gay rights activist
