= Speed Langworthy =

American lyricist

Norval Bertrand "Speed" Langworthy
- Born: May 15, 1901; Seward County, Nebraska
- Died: March 22, 1999 (aged 97)
- Occupations: Lyricist, Newspaper Magnate, International Relations Expert, Advertising Account Executive
- Known for: Lyricist, hit songs, newspaper business

Norval Bertrand "Speed" Langworthy (May 15, 1901 – March 22, 1999) was an American lyricist, newspaper magnate, international relations expert, and advertising account executive.

== Early life and education ==
Norval Bertrand "Speed" Langworthy was born in Seward County, Nebraska to Bertrand Scott Langworthy (1877 - 1920) and Eva Maude Norval (1879-1984). His father was a member of Sigma Alpha Epsilon in 1898. Langworthy's parents married on June 28, 1900. They moved from Nebraska to near Sheridan, Wyoming. Bertrand S. Langworthy took work as a cattle rancher. The family had moved to Buffalo, Wyoming by 1910. The elder Langworthy founded the Montana National Bank (First National Bank) in 1912. By 1920, Langworthy had moved to Billings, Montana. Langworthy was raised as a Seventh-day Adventist and relocated to Battle Creek, Michigan by 1920. Langworthy may have been a patient of Dr. John Harvey Kellogg, of the Kellogg's, at Battle Creek Sanitarium.

Langworthy attended high school in Billings, graduating from Culver Military Academy. He then enrolled at Beloit College, graduating with a degree in advertising and journalism. He earned the nickname "Speed" by running the 100-yard dash in ten seconds at Beloit.

== Career ==
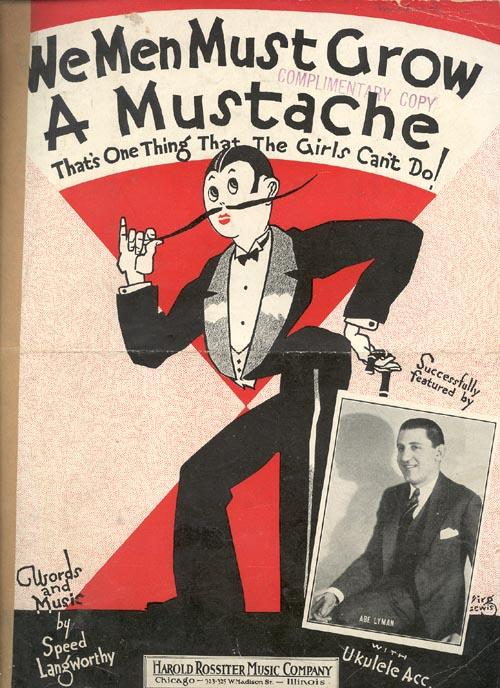
"We Men Must Grow A Mustache" by Speed Langworthy, 1922.

Speed Langworthy was a songwriter of novelty songs and musical comedy. His signature songs were "We Men Must Grow a Mustache" and "Christofo Columbo (Thought the world was roundo)." Langworthy's other songs did not find as great as success. He wrote "Winning the War at Culver" for D. H. Rathbun in 1920 from Battle Creek, Michigan. Langworthy wrote Youthtime is Springtime in 1923.

Langworthy became a fraternity member of Alpha Zeta in 1924. Langworthy wrote "I'd Love to Have a Sweetheart" for the Beloit fraternity in 1924. He also wrote "The Mother of Sigma Chi" for Sigma Chi.

Langworthy found success with his 1925 hit, "Christofo Columbo (Thought the world was roundo)". The song was recorded by the Max Terr Orchestra by Pathé.

"Dot's vot Looie uses" is a song written by Langworthy in 1925. The song pokes fun at the rise in Americans who still moonshine in defiance of Prohibition.

Langworthy and Jean Anthony Greif wrote "I Can't Live Without Just You" in 1926. Langworthy wrote "By the side of the Omelette Sea" (1926). In 1926, Langworthy wrote Ukollegiate Songs for the Ukulele and Four Chord Uke Song-Book (1926).

In 1927, Langworthy and Leslie O. Reed made a mockery of President Calvin Coolidge through the song, "I'd Like to Fish With the President! The Funny Song That Makes "Cal" Laugh!

His other song credits include "Meenie from Meeneesota" (1927), "I'm Painting your Face in the Moon" (1928) and "Me and Mah Razor" (1928). He wrote "Chick, Chick, Chicken!" (1929), "Ah Wed 300 Pounds" (1929), "Shake Yo' Shoes : With Piano" (1929).

Langworthy moved to write musical comedy for the T. S. Denison company in Chicago. He was a permanent fixture for the company's so-called Denison musicals in the late 1920s into the 1930s.

In 1928, he and Harry L. Alford wrote "Denison's mirthquake minstrel : opening chorus."

In 1929, he and Harry L. Alford wrote "Denison's seven-eleven minstrel : opening chorus" and "Denison's minstrel opening choruses and finalés: Seven-eleven." Langworthy, Alford, and Carl Hendrickson also wrote "Revue 5."

He co-wrote with Vernon Richner the Negro spiritual, "Gwine to Heaben Some Day."

In 1930, Langworthy teamed up with Fred Rose (songwriter), Geoffrey F Morgan, Leo Friedman and Harry L Alford to write "A dumb waiter, a musical comedy in two acts.

He co-wrote "A bold front, a musical comedy in two acts" in 1930 with Rose, Morgan, and Alford.

== Personal life ==
On June 28, 1928, Langworthy married June Lucille Judy. The couple had their first child, Robert Norval, in Chicago, on June 25, 1929. The couple enjoyed their early married life in a home in Evanston, Illinois. The couple had a daughter, June Judy, on January 4, 1943. In 1949 they moved to Hinsdale, Illinois where they lived until Norval retired and they moved to Tucson, Arizona, where they lived for the remainder of their lives.

== Later years ==
Langworthy retired as a lyricist to focus on international relations, advertising, and his newspaper business. He designed a portfolio and had it patented on June 12, 1945. The Langworthys had a taste for fraternities. Langworthy's father had been a fraternity member. Langworthy established his own fraternity, the Buckaroosters, in 1948. Langworthy's fraternity brothers included mostly his childhood friends, business associates, barbershop quartet. The Buckaroosters would perform barbershop quartets and follow the weather reports of the National Weather Service from Norman's Conoco station. The fraternity is still in existence today, meeting every single year annually for the last 75 years.

Langworthy wrote "4 chord "uke" instructor : the world's easiest ukulele song book" in 1950.

Langworthy's works remained in copyright in the postwar era. "Dot's vot Looie uses" was also still in copyright as of 1952. As of Sept. 30, 1953, Langworthy's Four Chord System was still in copyright. "Looking Out the Window" co-written with Vernon Richner was still in copyright as of 1955. "I'd Like to Fish With the President! The Funny Song That Makes "Cal" Laugh!" was in copyright on June 24, 1955. As of March 31, 1958, "A Bold Front" is in copyright. As of July 28, 1970, Earl Baumgarten and Langworthy's "Wild, Wild Roses" was in copyright.

Langworthy stayed in the Chicago metropolitan area until his retirement from advertising in 1967. He and his wife June then moved to Tucson, Arizona.

The Billings Gazette interviewed Langworthy in 1972. In the article it was reported that the Langworthy family had purchased a cabin near Big Timber, Montana in 1947 where they spent their summers. The cabin remains in the Langworthy family to this day.

Speed Langworthy died on March 22, 1999.

== Cultural impact ==
"Speed Langworthy's song "We Men Must Grow a Mustache" comically reflects one public desire for more manly men," writes Mary Katherine Killeen, "The cartoon man depicted on the sheet music cover is especially relevant because he highlights the performative nature of the masculine image. The illustrated character is depicted with his chest so inflated that his posture has hollowed his back, and his overly groomed manner of dress and style satirize the attempts of a Dandy affecting a more masculine image by growing a mustache."

== Bibliography ==
- Langworthy, William Franklin (1940). The Langworthy Family, Some Descendants of Andrew and Rachel (Hubbard) Langworthy. Rutland, Vermont: Tuttle.
