= Henry Oliver Walker =

American painter (1843–1929)

- Born: May 14, 1843; Boston, Massachusetts, US
- Died: January 14, 1929 (aged 85); Belmont, Massachusetts, US
- Education: École des Beaux-Arts

Henry Oliver Walker (May 14, 1843 – January 14, 1929) was an American painter of figures and portraits best known for his mural decorations. His works include a series of paintings honoring various poets for the Library of Congress and decorations for public buildings such as the Appellate Court House in New York City, Bowdoin College in Maine, the Massachusetts State House, the Minnesota State Capitol, and the Court House in Newark, New Jersey.

== Life ==
Walker was born in Boston, Massachusetts. In 1879, he went Paris, France to study painting under Léon Bonnat at the École des Beaux-Arts. After returning to the United States in 1882, he lived for a few years in Boston, then moved to New York and set up a studio there. In 1884, Walker exhibited two portraits at the Boston Art Club, and in 1885 he exhibited another portrait.

In 1888, at the suggestion of Thomas Dewing, he established a studio in Cornish, New Hampshire. In Cornish he was part of the Cornish Art Colony that included such artists as Dewing, Augustus Saint-Gaudens, Maxfield Parrish, Louis St. Gaudens, Charles A. Platt, and Kenyon Cox.

In 1888 he married Laura Marquand, a textile designer and decorative artist. He became a member of the National Academy of Design, New York, in 1902. Walker died in Belmont, Massachusetts.

== Gallery ==
Portrait of an Unknown Bearded Gentleman. Oil on canvas, 1886

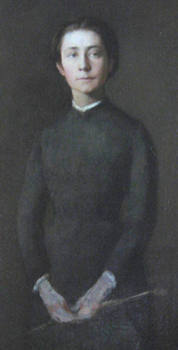
Detail from Laura Marquand, future wife of the artist, c. 1887

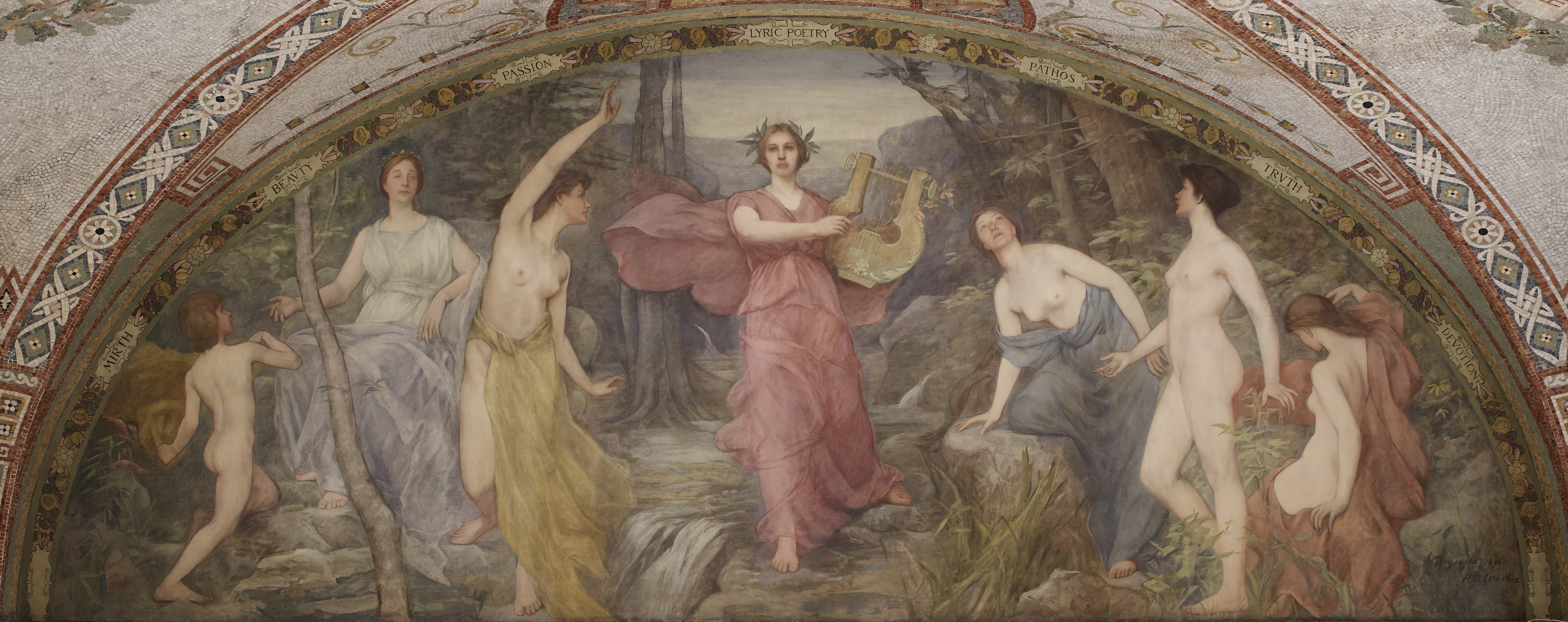
Lyric Poetry (1896), Library of Congress Thomas Jefferson Building, Washington, D.C.

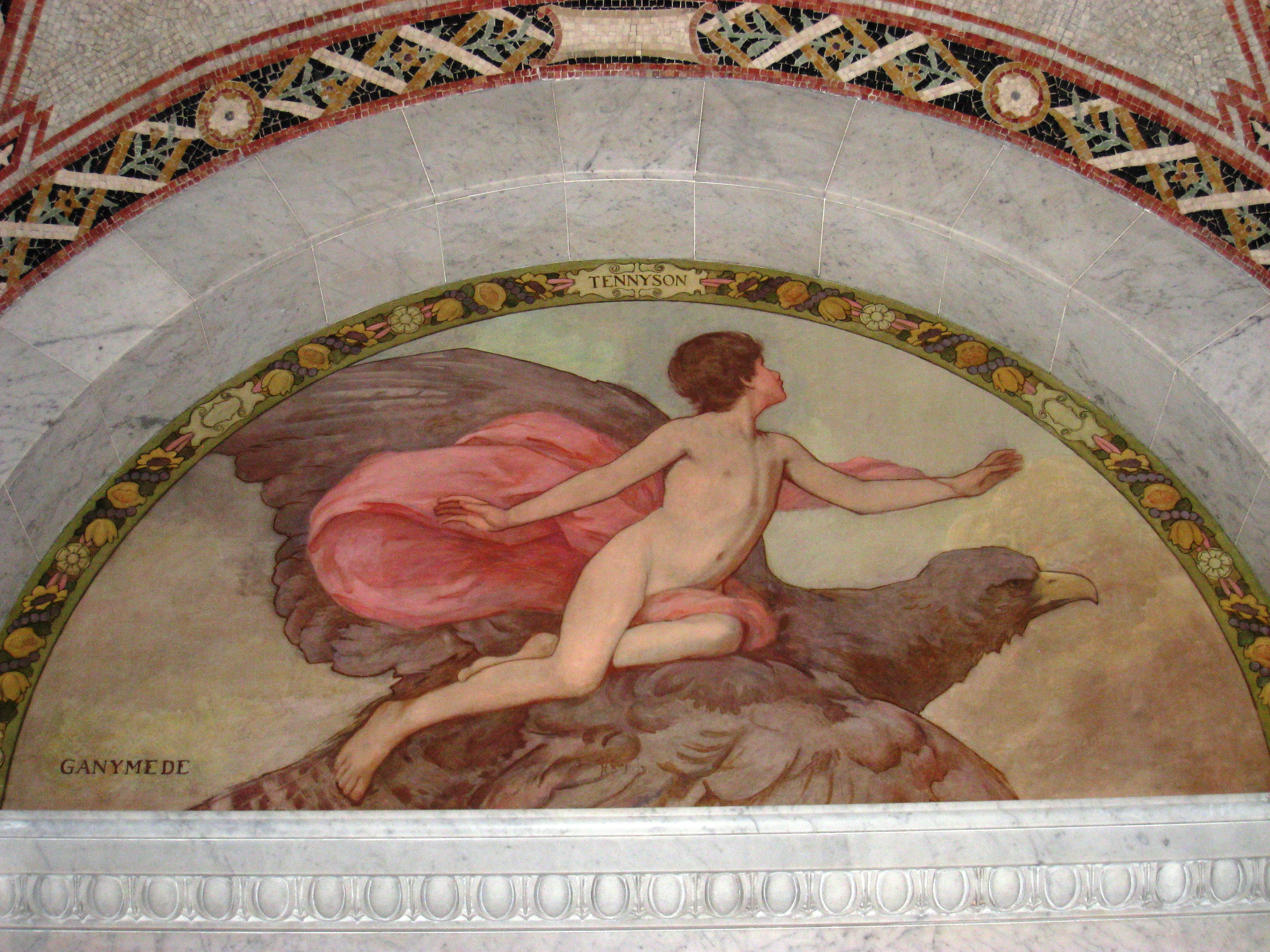
Ganymede (1896), Library of Congress Thomas Jefferson Building, Washington, D.C.

Adonis (1896), Library of Congress Thomas Jefferson Building, Washington, D.C

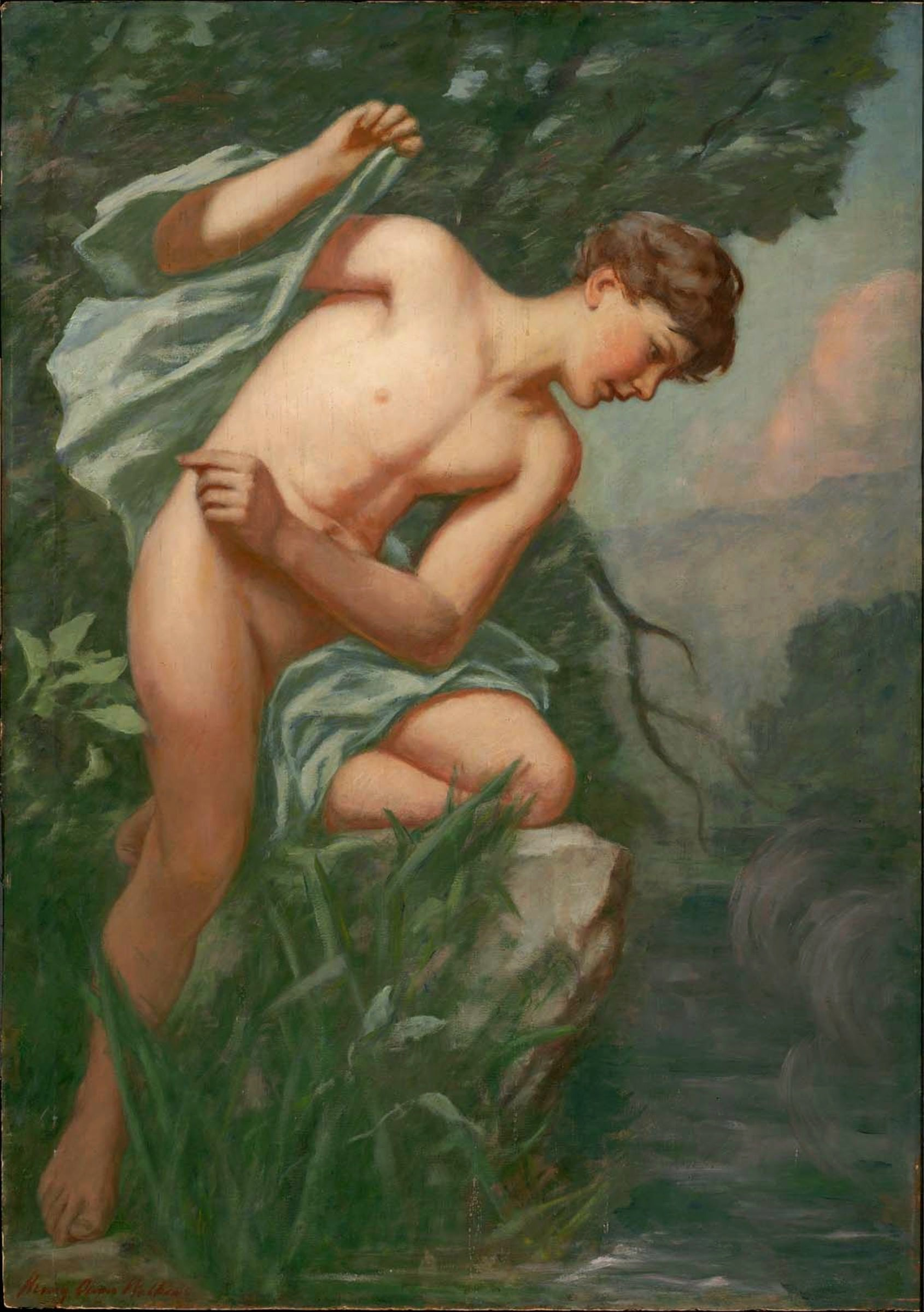
Narcissus (1890s), Museum of Fine Arts Boston

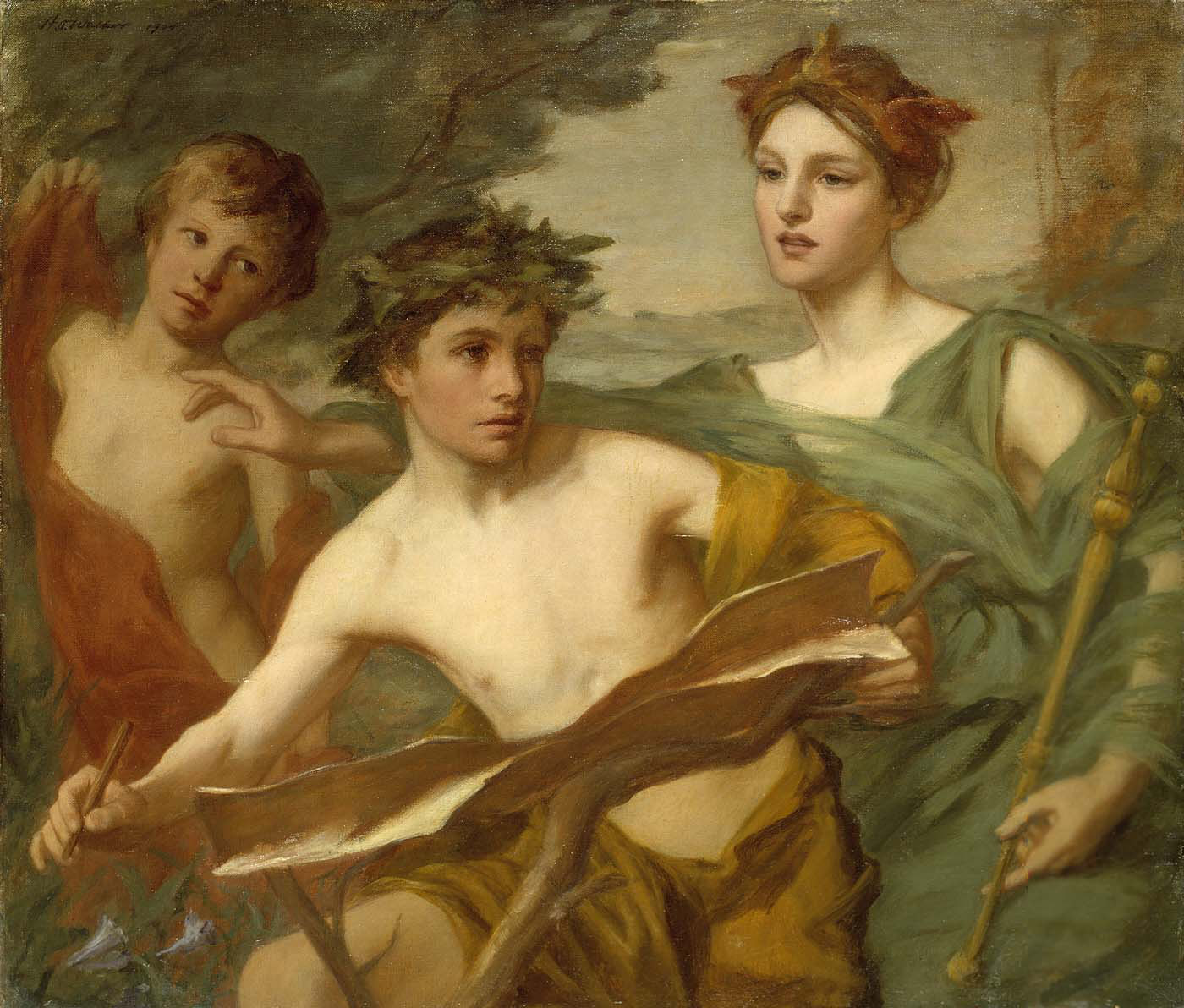
Musa Regina (1905), Smithsonian American Art Museum
