= Carl Schlegel =

German-American minister (1863–1922)

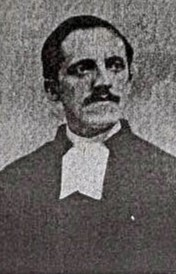
- Schlegel in 1898
- Born: March 29, 1863; Pfullingen, Germany
- Died: July 25, 1922 (aged 59); New York City, United States

Carl Schlegel (March 29, 1863 - July 25, 1922) was a German-American Presbyterian minister and gay rights activist.

== Life ==
Schlegel was born in Pfullingen, Germany on March 29, 1863. In 1878, Schlegel moved to the United States. He attended the Bloomfield Theological Seminary, graduating in 1895, and was ordained as a minister in 1896. He began his preaching career in New York City, serving a primarily German-speaking congregation. While he was serving as a minister, he was also a regular participant in meetings of the Scientific-Humanitarian Committee, a German-based organization that was the first gay rights advocacy group in the world. In a 1903 meeting of the group, Schlegel announced his intention to create a New York-based subcommittee and to organize other ministers to advocate for gay rights. In late 1903, Schlegel was arrested in Germany for an unspecified sexual offense. After returning to the United States, Schlegel continued working as a minister until resigning from his church in 1905 and moving to New Orleans.

While Schlegel found a new congregation, he was quickly faced with an investigation by the elders of his new church, who accused him of "Uranism" and of promoting "grossly immoral doctrines." In his defense against the allegations, Schlegel argued that he was not entirely opposed to the church's traditional teaching on same-sex relationships, but believed that the same sex laws should be applied to people of all sexualities equally, arguing that only those who used "compulsion," "offend[ed] publicly," or abused children should be punished. This defense backfired, however, as his position that sex laws should be applied equally to all people was interpreted as a defense of "the lawfulness and naturalness" of same-sex relationships.

He was dismissed by his church in 1907 and was also defrocked. After being dismissed, he returned to New York and became a spiritualist. He died on July 25, 1922 and was buried at the Cemetery of the Evergreens.

== Legacy ==
Schlegel's life was largely unnoticed by historians until 2019, when historian Jonathan Ned Katz uncovered mention of Schlegel's dismissals in the Presbyterian Historical Society's archives.
