= Terry Todd =

American powerlifter and historian (1938–2018)

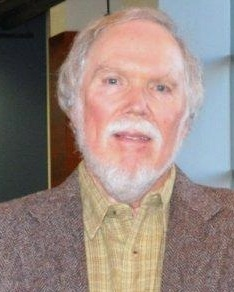
- Born: January 1, 1938; Austin, Texas, U.S.
- Died: July 7, 2018 (aged 80); Austin, Texas, U.S.
- Education: University of Texas, Austin
- Occupations: powerlifting, Olympic weightlifting, historian
- Height: 6 ft 2 in (1.88 m)
- Spouse: Jan Todd (m. 1973)

Competition record

Powerlifting

Representing United States

AAU US National Championships
1st	1964	+90kg
1st	1965	+90kg
2nd	1966	+90kg

Olympic weightlifting

Representing United States

Junior National Weightlifting Championships
1st	1963	+90kg

Terence Todd (January 1, 1938 – July 7, 2018) was an American powerlifter, Olympic weightlifter, author, researcher, historian, and a strength and physical culture promoter.

Todd was co-founder of the H.J. Lutcher Stark Center for Physical Culture and Sports, co-editor of Iron Game History: The Journal of Physical Culture, event director of the World's Strongest Man, and creator of the Arnold Strongman Classic. Todd also held a career as a journalist on the staff of Sports Illustrated magazine, as well as doing commentary for CBS, NBC, ESPN and National Public Radio.

== Early life and education ==
Todd was born in Beaumont, Texas, and moved to Austin, Texas while in elementary school. Todd was on the tennis team at Travis High School and began weight training after graduating to make his left arm as strong as his dominant tennis arm. He played on the varsity tennis team at the University of Texas at Austin in his freshman and sophomore years and then quit the team to pursue weightlifting. He majored in English as an undergraduate and completed his doctoral degree in the history and philosophy of education in 1966.

== Athletic history ==
Todd began as a weightlifter in 1956, and won the Junior Nationals in Olympic weightlifting in 1963. He then turned to powerlifting, and won the first two national championships in 1964 and in 1965 (the first official Senior Nationals) as a superheavyweight. At 1964 AAU Powerlifting Tournament Of America, Todd became the first man to Deadlift 700 lb (317.5 kg) in a documented and official setting with irrefutable evidence, hence initiating the inaugural official world record deadlift at 710 lb (322 kg). At 1965 AAU Senior Nationals Todd raised the world record to 740 lb (336 kg). At 1966 AAU Senior Nationals Todd became the first man to Squat 700 lb (317.5 kg) in wraps. His best bench press was 477 lb (216 kg). Todd retired from competition in 1967.

== Powerlifting Federation services ==
Todd was directly involved in the development of the sport of women's powerlifting. He helped his wife Jan Todd organize the first national women's meet in 1977, and coached the women's Canadian team, with Jan, from 1976 to 1979. In 1979, Todd was elected to the Executive Committee of the United States Powerlifting Federation. Todd lobbied for, and ultimately achieved autonomy for the women's committee, but finally abandoned the USPF when he could not convince the organization to institute a steroid testing program for men and women lifters. In the following few years, he also did color commentary for national and international powerlifting events for NBC, CBS, ESPN, and the BBC, some of which involved women's powerlifting.

In 1977, Todd published the first major book about powerlifting, called Inside Powerlifting. Todd covered the major national and international powerlifting events during the 1970s and 1980s for such magazines as Muscular Development and Iron Man. He also helped to introduce powerlifting to a larger audience through his articles in Sports Illustrated, covering such lifters as Lamar Gant, Bill Kazmaier, Larry Pacifico, and Jan Todd.

== Later years ==
Once he stopped competing, he became a college professor in 1967 at Auburn University. Todd taught at several universities in both the United States and Canada before finally returning to his alma mater, the University of Texas, in 1983.

In 1990, Todd and his wife Jan founded Iron Game History: The Journal of Physical Culture, a scholarly journal for the history of physical culture.

Todd and his wife Jan also founded the H.J. Lutcher Stark Center for Physical Culture and Sports, which is housed in the Darrell K Royal–Texas Memorial Stadium at The University of Texas in Austin. It contains more than 150,000 books, photos, films, magazines, letters, training courses, videotapes, posters, paintings and artifacts across its 27,500 square feet (2,550 m^{2}). The collection covers the history of competitive lifting, professional strongmen and strongwomen, sports nutrition, bodybuilding, naturopathy, conditioning for athletes, drug use in sports and alternative medicine. Todd retired from the classroom in the 1990s and served as the Director of the H.J. Lutcher Stark Center for Physical Culture and Sports until at least 2009.

In 2001, Todd was asked by Arnold Schwarzenegger to create a strongman contest for the annual Arnold Sports Festival, which is held in Columbus, Ohio.

In 2018, four months before his death, he and Jan were inducted into the International Sports Hall of Fame.

== Personal life ==
Todd met his wife Jan while in college at Mercer University. He fell in love with her at a barbecue, when he saw her flip a massive log without giggling or showing any false modesty. The two lived on a 300-acre (1.2 km^{2}) cattle ranch on the San Marcos River with a large collection of animals including five peacocks, a Percheron draft horse, 50 cattle, two Sicilian donkeys, an English Mastiff dog, an emu, and three Maine Coon cats.

Todd died on July 7, 2018, in Austin, Texas, at the age of 80. Former Governor of California Schwarzenegger released a statement on Twitter: "[Todd] was such a monster – a true force, but also a kind heart and a great storyteller".

== Personal records ==
- Squat – 720 lb (326.5 kg)
- Bench press – 515 lb (233.5 kg)
- Deadlift – 742 lb (336.5 kg)
