= James Lorimer =

James Lorimer may refer to:

- James Lorimer (Australian politician) (1831–1889)
- James Lorimer (South African politician) (born 1962)
- James Lorimer (advocate) (1818–1890), Scottish advocate and professor of public law
- James Gibson Lorimer (1923–2012), lawyer and political figure in British Columbia
- James J. Lorimer (1926–2022), American attorney and Arnold Festival co-founder
- James Lorimer (publisher), Canadian author and book publisher

== See also ==
- James Lorimer Ilsley (1894–1967), Canadian politician and jurist
