= Jan Todd =

American educator (born 1952)

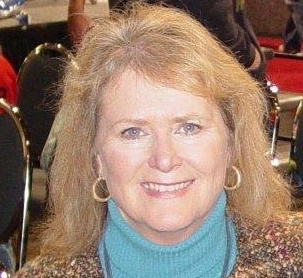
- Born: Janice Suffolk; May 22, 1952 (age 74); Pennsylvania, U.S.
- Occupations: powerlifter, historian, professor
- Spouse: Terry Todd (m. 1973; died 2018)

Janice Todd (née Suffolk; born May 22, 1952) is an American former powerlifter, historian, researcher and a strength and physical culture promoter. She is a professor and department chair in the Department of Kinesiology and Health Education at The University of Texas at Austin. Todd is a member of the sport management faculty, and teaches classes in sport history, sport philosophy, and sport and ethics. An active lecturer, Todd was named the Seward Staley Honor Lecturer for the North American Society for Sport History in 2008.

== Early life and education ==
Todd grew up in Western Pennsylvania in a low-income family. She went to college at Mercer University.

== Career ==
=== Powerlifting ===
Todd’s interest in the study of sport and physical culture was galvanized by her participation and success in the sport of powerlifting. During her powerlifting career, many publications, including Sports Illustrated magazine, considered her to be the strongest woman in the world. Arnold Schwarzenegger described her as a 'legend' and a "pioneer who led the way for strongwomen". Todd "bent bottle caps with her fingers, lifted her Ford Fiesta for fun and drove nails through wooden boards with her palms".

As a powerlifter, Todd set more than 60 national and world records, and was included in the Guinness Book of Records for over a decade. On 2 February 1978 she appeared on The Tonight Show Starring Johnny Carson, performing several lifts along with Johnny Carson. In 1982 she became the first woman inducted into the International Powerlifting Hall of Fame. She was inducted in the first class of the Women’s Powerlifting Hall of Fame (in 2004), and the 2009 class of the US National Fitness Hall of Fame. She also received the 2008 Oscar Heidenstam Foundation Lifetime Achievement Award for her contributions in the field of physical fitness. In 2018, she was inducted into the International Sports Hall of Fame.

==== Organizing and coaching powerlifting ====
Todd and her husband Terry Todd organized the first national women's powerlifting meet in 1977, and together coached the women's Canadian powerlifting team from 1976 to 1979.

=== Dinnie Stones ===
Todd is perhaps best known outside the powerlifting community for being the first woman to lift the Dinnie Stones in 1979 (which she did assisted with straps). No woman lifted them again until Leigh Holland-Keen in 2018.

== Personal records ==
Powerlifting:
Equipped (single ply):

- Squat – 540 lb (245 kg) (1980 USPF Atlanta Women's Open) (former world record)

→ First woman to squat 400 lb (181 kg) and 500 lb (227 kg) in a sanctioned meet

- Bench press – 204 lb (93 kg) (1980 USPF Atlanta Women's Open & 1981 USPF Women's Nationals)
- Deadlift – 474 lb (215 kg) (1980 USPF Atlanta Women's Open & 1983 USPF Women's Nationals) (former world record)
- Total – 1,218 lb (552 kg) (540 + 204 + 474 lb (245 + 93 + 215 kg)) (1980 USPF Atlanta Women's Open) (former world record)

→ First woman to total 1,000 lb (454 kg), 1,100 lb (499 kg) and 1,200 lb (544 kg)

Raw:

- Squat (w/ wraps) – 385 lb (175 kg) (1977 First All American Women's Power Meet)
- Bench press – 170 lb (77 kg) (1977 First All American Women's Power Meet)
- Deadlift – 415 lb (188 kg) (1977 First All American Women's Power Meet) (former world record)

→ First woman to deadlift 400 lb (181 kg) in a sanctioned meet

- Total – 970 lb (440 kg) (385 + 170 + 415 lb (175 + 77 + 188 kg)) (1977 First All American Women's Power Meet)

Strongman:

- Dinnie Stones (assisted lift with straps) – 733 lb (332 kg) stones (1979) (former world record)

→ First woman to lift the stones. The feat remained unmatched for 39 years (until Leigh Holland-Keen lifted them assisted in 2018) and unsurpassed for 40 years (until Emmajane Smith lifted them unassisted in 2019)

== Later years ==
Todd also serves as co-editor of Iron Game History: The Journal of Physical Culture, a scholarly journal for the history of physical culture. She and her husband founded Iron Game History together in 1990, while she was studying for her PhD in American Studies. In addition, she has written numerous articles on topics such as sport and exercise history, anabolic steroids, and strength training as well as two books: Physical Culture and the Body Beautiful: Purposive Exercise in the Lives of American Women (Mercer University Press, 1998), and Lift Your Way to Youthful Fitness (Little-Brown, 1985).

With her husband, Terry Todd, Jan Todd founded the H.J. Lutcher Stark Center for Physical Culture and Sports, which is housed in the Darrell K Royal–Texas Memorial Stadium at The University of Texas in Austin. It contains more than 150,000 books, photos, films, magazines, letters, training courses, videotapes, posters, paintings and artifacts across its 27,500 square feet (2,550 m^{2}). The collection covers the history of competitive lifting, professional strongmen and strongwomen, sports nutrition, bodybuilding, naturopathy, conditioning for athletes, drug use in sports and alternative medicine.

== Personal life ==
She met her husband Terry Todd while in college at Mercer University. He fell in love with her at a barbecue, when he saw her flip a massive log without giggling or showing any false modesty.

The two lived on a 300-acre (1.2 km^{2}) cattle ranch on the San Marcos River with a large collection of animals including five peacocks, a Percheron draft horse, 50 cattle, two Sicilian donkeys, an English Mastiff dog, an emu, and three Maine Coon cats.

Terry died on July 7, 2018, in Austin, Texas, at the age of 80.
