= ISHOF =

ISHOF may refer to:

- The International Space Hall of Fame in Alamogordo, New Mexico, US
- The International Sports Hall of Fame in Chicago, Illinois, US
- The International Swimming Hall of Fame in Fort Lauderdale, Florida, US
