= Runaway Nightmare =

1982 film by Mike Cartel

- DVD cover
- Directed by: Mike Cartel
- Written by: Mike Cartel
- Produced by: Eldon Short
- Starring: Mike Cartel; Al Valetta; Seeska Vandenberg; Georgia Durante; Jody Lee Olhava
- Edited by: Mike Cartel
- Release date: 1982
- Running time: 105 minutes
- Country: United States
- Language: English

Runaway Nightmare is a 1982 American dark comedy thriller film written, edited, directed by, and starring Mike Cartel. It also stars Al Valetta, Seeska Vandenberg, Georgia Durante, and Jody Lee Olhava, and follows two desert worm ranchers who find themselves caught between a female death cult and the mafia over precious stolen plutonium. The film developed a cult following and had a national theatrical re-release in 2014.

== Plot ==
Two Death Valley worm wranglers, Ralph (Mike Cartel) and Jason (Al Valetta) secretly watch strangers bury a coffin in an empty ravine. When the gravediggers leave, Ralph and Jason uncover the shallow grave to find a beautiful woman marked with the name "Fate" (Seeska Vandenberg) unconscious in the box.

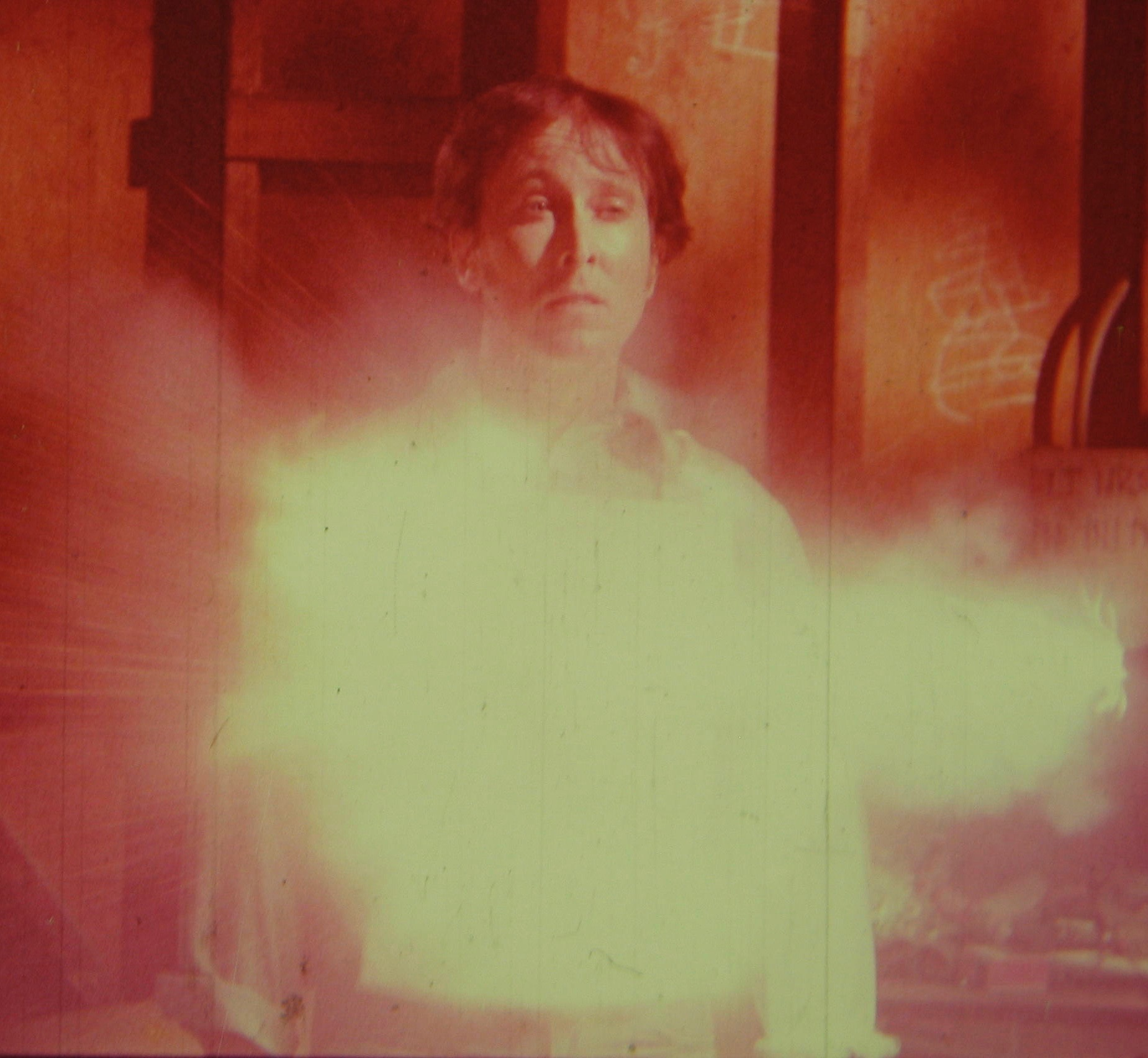
Ralph (Mike Cartel) takes a shotgun blast to the chest while wearing a cheap bullet-resistant vest.

After saving Fate's life, the worm ranchers get abducted by several female cultists who were searching for their recently vanished sister-member, Fate. At the cult commune, Ralph and Jason finish a series of lunatical ordeals that earn them membership in the clan. Amiable Jason quickly finds romance from the group while hostile Ralph is treated with contempt.

The cult boss, Hesperia (Cindy Donlan) tells the men that Fate had been negotiating with a gunrunning cartel to help her sell something priceless (referred to as platinum) on the world market for a fee, but was instead betrayed. The cartel group then buried Fate as a warning. Fate says the mysterious contraband is under guard at the cartel desert warehouse, that she knows intimately. Hesperia leads a break-in to steal back the platinum, using Ralph and Jason as expendable decoys.

The heist is successful but the outraged cartel follow the cult and attack the commune in a ferocious gun battle. Hesperia loads her girls and Jason in a helicopter from the commune roof to the worm ranch. Ralph is left behind, captured and brought back to the warehouse for a tortuous interrogation. At the moment before death, an explosion from a time bomb set earlier by Ralph saves him, while eliminating his tormentors.

Fate meets Ralph after answering his phone call for help. She drives to the commune, gets Ralph to tell where he hid the mysterious platinum box, then casually shoots him. Unknown to Fate, Ralph still wears an armored vest (under his shirt) from the earlier gunfight but plays dead as Fate drives away.

At the commune, Fate finds the invaluable suitcase as Ralph described and opens it immediately. Fate breaks the lock and lifts out a metal box – but it moves on the table, glowing as it slowly unseals. Fate fights to shut the lid while burning light from the box ignites walls, table, floor into fire as the commune, with Fate, vaporizes.

Ralph learns that Hesperia has abandoned her cult, flying away as mystically as she had arrived. With sly malice, Ralph puts the confused women to work on his worm ranch. While delighted with the arrangement, Ralph and Jason see what seems to be another human burial down their hill. This time, the coffin's payload is far worse, but may be just what vampiric Ralph has needed all along.

== Cast ==
- Mike Cartel as Ralph
- Al Valetta as Jason
- Seeska Vandenberg as Fate
- Georgia Durante as Leslie
- Jody Lee Olhava as Torchy
- Cindy Donlan as Hesperia
- Alexis Alexander as Vampiria
- Cheryl Gamson as Pepper
- Debbie Poropat as Sadie
- Roselyn Royce as Zero
- Kathy Mojas as Pandora
- Ina Rose Fortman as Clio
- Mari Cartel as Andromeda
- Jodie Perbix as Electra
- Donna Paris as Butch
- J. Christopher Senter as Mr. X
- Evelyn King Kennedy as Skitso
- Karen Stride as Masey

== Production ==
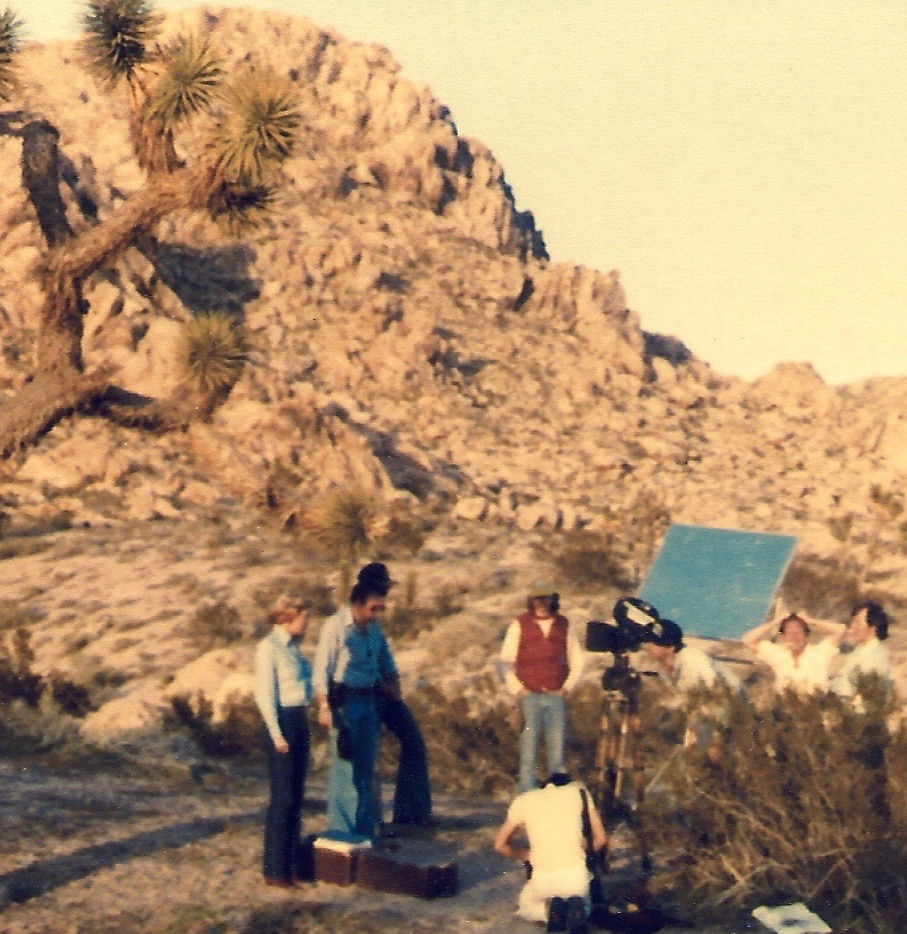
Cartel's weekend desert 6-person crew rushes remaining shots before the sun sets.

The unfinished second draft of Runaway Nightmare was rushed into production by Mike Cartel after having taken over direction of his ailing film project Bitter Heritage in late 1978.

With a 48-hour turnaround and pre-production, Runaway Nightmare began filming with the same Bitter Heritage crew and location set. For casting, Cartel asked actors Al Valetta and Georgia Durante from Bitter Heritage to join the production while Cartel's wife, Mari filled most of the actress roles with model/actress acquaintances from her days as a Jack LaLanne health spa manager and aerobics teacher.

After a horrific three-week schedule, Cartel was unsatisfied with the coverage (while editing himself) and started shooting on weekends with a skeleton crew, cheap Friday-Monday rentals, scratch track sound, staged from his own home studio with movable sets and unpaid or deferment-paid actors while going without insurance or permits. Everything except lab and raw stock bills were bargained or bartered as filming labored for another two years, although there were weeks when nothing was filmed.

Cartel also saved money by doing his own dangerous stunts that included taking a shotgun blast to his chest while wearing a cheap bullet-resistant vest; crashing through a glass window door; falling down a concrete cellar staircase; having a "stunt" bottle smashed across his face, then doing a barroom fight scene with a very large bar patron he met the morning of the improvised sequence.

=== Music ===
Runaway Nightmare features three individual songs that play during the film, including two written for the movie, "Hard to Find" and "Sunnin'", and "If You Won't Say You Love Me", written by Cartel's mother and released by Imperial Records in 1955.

== Release ==
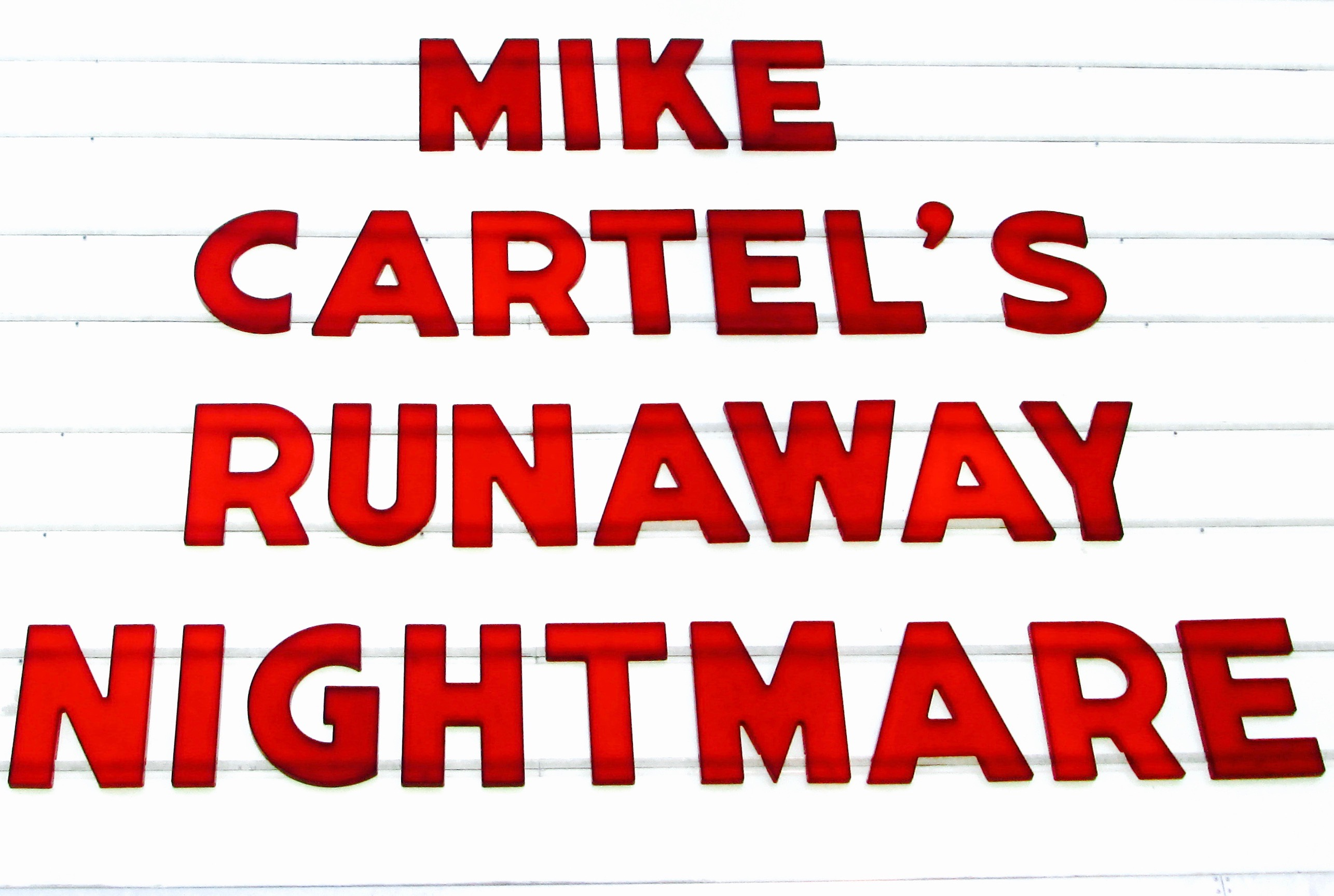
L.A. movie marquee for Runaway Nightmare theatrical premiere, July 22, 2014

Cartel spent another year in post-production until the project arrived in 1982 as an 8460-foot answer print. Contracted with one distributor, Cartel later discovered Runaway Nightmare online as a home video, marketed by a completely different distributor (with unauthorized nude inserts spliced into several scenes) where it was released as one of the first straight-to-video VHS cassettes.

After several years without fanfare, the "underground" film Runaway Nightmare slowly developed a loyal cult following.

A film restoration and distribution company, Vinegar Syndrome, approached Cartel in 2013 regarding his possible interest in a modern "director's cut" (without the bizarre nudity) release of Runaway Nightmare in several forms of media.

In early June 2014, Runaway Nightmare arrived on DVD, Ultra HD Blu-ray, and even a retro-VHS version from Tyler Babtist's Videonomicon. An audio commentary came with the new release where Cartel could finally explain his singular production backstory, scene by scene with film historian/filmmaker Howard S. Berger, moderator (film preservationist/distributor) Joe Rubin and polymath Mari Cartel.

The next month, Runaway Nightmare premiered in its first 35 mm showing as a theatrical release, followed by a national cinema tour.

== Critical reception ==
Joe Yanick of Diabolique Magazine called the film "an enigma; a sexploitation without the nudity; a rare hybrid quasi-exploitative-horror-comedy-western-noir that has been salvaged from the past [...] let yourself go and have some fun."
