= International Sports Hall of Fame =

American non-profit organization

International Sport Hall of Fame
- Discipline: Sports and physical culture
- Awarded for: "Outstanding career achievements and giving back to the society"
- Location: Chicago, Illinois
- Country: United States
- Presented by: Dr. Robert M. Goldman; Fairfax Hackley

History
- Editions: 15
- First winner: Class of 2012
- Most recent: Class of 2026
- Website: ishof.net

The International Sports Hall of Fame (ISHOF) is a section 501(c)(3) non-profit organization established in 2012 by Dr. Robert M. Goldman to honor exceptional athletes and sporting figures for their accomplishments and dedication to furthering the fields of sports and physical culture.

The inductees are bestowed with their own official ISHOF emblem, a gold lapel pin, a gold medallion, a hand crafted gold medal and the inclusion into the H.J. Lutcher Stark Center for Physical Culture and Sports which is an archive and museum dedicated to the study and preservation of the world of physical culture.

== Nominations ==
With its mission being 'inspiring future generations of athletes by honoring the sports heroes of today, potential induction candidates from worldwide are picked and shortlisted by a twenty-member 'Global Advisory Board' chaired by the president Dr. Robert M. Goldman and vice president Fairfax Hackley. The winners are selected based on their past and present contributions to the sports world and their charitable works mentoring youth and inspiring future generations of athletes with a "giving back" mindset.

== Induction Ceremonies ==
Since its inauguration in 2012, the Hall of Fame Induction ceremony was held in conjunction with the Arnold Schwarzenegger Sports Festival, in Columbus, Ohio. From 2024 onwards, the event was moved to Las Vegas and held in conjunction with the Olympia Weekend. Each year, five to seven individuals are selected to be inducted.

As of 2026, 84 individuals have been inducted to the International Sports Hall of Fame.

== Inductees ==
Class of 2012

- Arnold Schwarzenegger (Austria) (United States) - 7x Mr. Olympia, 5x Mr. Universe, actor, former Governor of California
- James J. Lorimer (United States) - Co-founder of Arnold Sports Festival
- Jack LaLanne (United States) and Elaine LaLanne (United States) - Fitness and nutrition / motivational speakers
- Randy Couture (United States) - 6x UFC World Champion
- Corey Everson (United States) - 6x Ms. Olympia
- Mark Henry (United States) - Arnold Strongman Classic, weightlifting, and powerlifting champion, WWE Superstar

Class of 2013

- Bruno Sammartino (United States) (Italy) - World Wrestling Federation Champion, WWE Hall of Famer
- Franco Columbu (United States) (Italy) - 2x Mr. Olympia
- Archie Griffin (United States) - 2x Heisman Trophy Winner
- Earl 'The Pearl' Monroe (United States) - NBA Hall of Famer
- Blaine Carew Wilson (United States) - 5x Gymnastics national champion

Class of 2014

- Joe Weider (Canada) , Ben Weider (Canada) and Betty Weider (United States) - Founders of IFBB, fitness magazines publishers
- Lee Haney (United States) - 8x Mr. Olympia
- Jason Statham (United Kingdom) - Martial artist, actor, British national diving team
- Cynthia Rothrock (United States) - 5x Martial arts world champion
- Dan Gable (United States) - Olympic gold medalist in freestyle wrestling, coach

Class of 2015

- Evander Holyfield (United States) - 4x Heavyweight boxing champion
- Ed Coan (United States) - Powerlifting world champion, set 70+ world records
- Paul 'Triple H' Levesque (United States) - WWE Champion, sports administrator
- Lenda Murray (United States) - 8x Ms. Olympia
- Don 'The Dragon' Wilson (United States) - 11x world champion in kickboxing and actor
- Michael Jai White (United States) - Martial artist and actor

Class of 2016

- Ronnie Coleman (United States) - 8x Mr. Olympia
- Kurt Angle (United States) - Olympic gold medalist in freestyle wrestling, WWE Champion
- Royce Gracie (Brazil) - 1st UFC Champion
- Johnny Bench (United States) - Hall of fame baseball catcher
- AnnMaria De Mars (United States) - 1st American world judo champion

Class of 2017

- Lou Ferrigno (United States) - Mr. Universe, actor
- Bill Kazmaier (United States) - 3x World's Strongest Man, 2x powerlifting world champion
- Herschel Walker (United States) - Heisman Trophy & college football hall of famer
- Dr. Thomas Rosandich (United States) - Founder U.S. Sports Academy
- Apolo Ohno (United States) - Olympic speed skating champion

Class of 2018

- Dr. Terry Todd (United States) and Dr. Jan Todd (United States) - Powerlifting world champions, authors / publishers / historians
- Bas Rutten (United States) (Netherlands) - MMA world champion, actor
- Ronda Rousey (United States) - UFC champion, Olympic judo bronze medalist
- Phil Keoghan (New Zealand) - Sports documentarian

Class of 2019

- Benny 'The Jet' Urquidez (United States) - 5x Kickboxing world champion
- Rocky Bleier (United States) - 4x Super Bowl winner, Pittsburgh Steelers
- Tim Kennedy (United States) - MMA fighter, Special Forces soldier, actor
- Michael Buffer (United States) - Ring announcer
- David Goggins (United States) - Guinness World Record holder, Navy SEAL, ultra marathon runner

Class of 2020

- Lesley Visser (United States) - National Football League sportscaster, first female NFL analyst
- Johnny Damon (United States) - Major League Baseball player
- Kirstie Ennis (United States) - Amputee outdoor climber, former US Marine Corps Sergeant, public speaker
- Forrest Griffin (United States) - UFC Champion and Hall of Famer
- Eddie George (United States) - National Football League player

Class of 2021

- Jay Cutler (United States) - 4x Mr. Olympia
- Ernie Reyes Sr. (United States) - Martial artist, actor and fight choreographer
- Billy Blanks (United States) - Martial artist, creator of the Tae Bo exercise program
- Marcus Allen (United States) - National Football League player
- Peter Westbrook (United States) - 13x national Sabre champion and Olympic bronze medalist
- Stephanie McMahon (United States) - WWE executive

Class of 2022

- Ron Van Clief (United States) - Grandmaster Martial artist and actor
- Shannon Knapp (United States) - Martial artist, women's MMA pioneer
- Stipe Miocic (United States) - UFC Champion
- Vinny Paz (United States) - Lightweight and light middleweight Boxing champion
- Frank Shamrock (United States) - UFC Champion
- Burt Watson (United States) - Manager and sports promoter

Class of 2023

- Hafþór Júlíus Björnsson (Iceland) - World's Strongest Man, 3x Arnold Strongman Classic, broke 100+ world records
- Jackie Joyner-Kersee (United States) - 6x Olympic medalist in track and field, heptathlon world record holder
- Kayla Harrison (United States) - 2x Olympic judo gold medalist, 2x women’s MMA champion
- Richard Sorin (United States) - Strongman and grip strength specialist, founder of Sorinex exercise equipment
- Ronnie Lott (United States) - 4x NFL Super Bowl champion, pro football hall of famer

Class of 2024

- Phil Heath (United States) - 7x Mr. Olympia
- Brian Shaw (United States) - 4x World's Strongest Man, 3x Arnold Strongman Classic
- Jim Plunkett (United States) - 2x Super Bowl Champion
- Miesha Tate (United States) - UFC and Strikeforce Woman's MMA Champion
- J. J. Perry (United States) - Martial Arts Master, Stunt Legend, Film Producer
- Bruce Buffer (United States) - UFC Announcer

Class of 2025

- Ryan Crouser (United States) - 3x Olympic gold medalist, Shot put world record holder
- Fred Biletnikoff (United States) - NFL hall of famer
- Nancy Lieberman (United States) - Basketball hall of famer
- Bill Wallace (United States) - World champion Martial Artist
- Cydney Gillon (United States) - 8x Figure Olympia
- Leigh Steinberg (United States) - Sports Agent, Author

Class of 2026

- Vitomir Maricic: World Champion Free Diver
- Garry Kasparov: World Champion Chess Grandmaster
- Dexter Jackson: Mr. Olympia
- Forrest Griffin: UFC Hall of Famer
- The Harlem Globetrotters Organization

== Advisory Board ==
Global Advisory Board

- Dr. Robert M. Goldman - Founder and President
- Marcus Allen - NFL Hall of Famer and Super Bowl MVP
- Rick Collins - Attorney, General Counsel to the International Society of Sports Nutrition
- Randy Couture - UFC World Champion
- Prof. Dr. Eduardo DeRose - International Olympic Committee Medical Commission
- Dr. Nick DiNubulie - Former Team Orthopedic Consultant, NBA Philadelphia 76ers
- Dr. Ronald Klatz - Co-Founder A4M
- Alan Goldberg - Founder, Action Martial Arts Magazine
- Fairfax Hackley - Senior V.P., ISHOF
- Mark Henry - Arnold Strongman Classic Champion, WWE World Champion
- Jim Manion - President, IFBB Pro League
- Dr. Joseph Maroon - Team Neurosurgeon, NFL Pittsburgh Steelers
- Earl 'The Pearl' Monroe - NBA Hall of Fame
- Dan O'Malley - Professional Boxer and Wrestler
- Lenda Murray - American professional female bodybuilder and 8x Ms. Olympia.
- Gunnar Peterson - American celebrity trainer, author, businessman, and actor
- Dan Solomon - President, Mr. Olympia
- Bert Sorin - President Sorinex Exercise Equipment Company and Champion Highland Games and hammer thrower
- Dr. Jan Todd - Powerlifting world champion, historian, and Professor at University of Texas-Austin.
- Dr. James Stoxen - President, Team Doctors
- Grandmaster Ron Van Clief - Grandmaster, Actor, ISHOF Inductee of 2022
- Chef Rush - Celebrity Chef, Veteran, and Motivational Speaker.
- Christian Drapeau: Founder, Chief Science Officer - STEMREGEN
- Ryan Riley: CEO STEMREGEN, author
- Nodari Rizun: Founder Pürblack, human rights attorney, inventor, nature.com published scientist.
- Keith Dawkins- President of the Harlem Globetrotters Organization

Deceased Past members

- James J. Lorimer - Co-Founder Arnold Schwarzenegger Sports Festival
- Dr. Thomas Rosandich - Founder, U.S. Sports Academy
- Dr. Terry Todd - Powerlifting world champion, author, publisher and historian
- David P. Webster - Physical Culture Historian and author
- Franco Columbu - 2x Mr. Olympia
- Bruno Sammartino - World Wrestling Federation Champion, WWE Hall of Famer
- Richard Sorin - Strongman and grip strength specialist, founder of Sorinex exercise equipment
- Peter Westbrook - 13x national Sabre champion and Olympic bronze medalist
