= George F. Jowett =

English-born Canadian strongman (1891 - 1969)and weightlifter

George Fuisdale Jowett
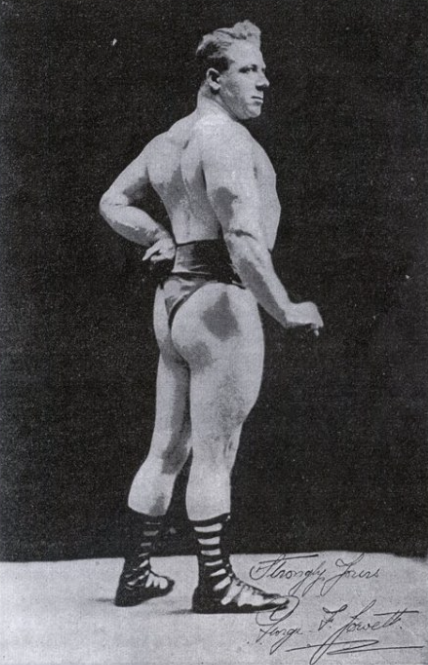
- Born: 23 December 1891; England
- Died: 11 July 1969 (aged 77); Ontario, Canada
- Occupations: Strongman, weightlifter, magazine editor, author
- Spouse: Bessie Jowett
- Children: 1 daughter

George Fuisdale Jowett (23 December 1891 – 11 July 1969) was an English-born Canadian strongman, weightlifter, magazine editor and author. He was a co-founder of the American Continental Weightlifting Association, the editor of Strength magazine, and the president of the Jowett Institute. He became known as "The Father of American Weightlifting."

== Life ==
Jowett was born on 23 December 1891, in England. He emigrated to Canada in 1911, and served in the Canadian Expeditionary Force in World War I.

Jowett moved to Pennsylvania in 1923, where he became a strongman and a weightlifter. He competed against other strongmen at a police meet in Pittsburgh in September 1923. By 1927, he was billing himself as the "world's strongest man" in The Morning Call. Jowett was the editor of Strength magazine from 1924 to 1927, and he authored several books about strength training.

Jowett co-founded the American Continental Weightlifting Association (ACWLA) with Ottley Russell Coulter and David P. Willoughby in the early 1920s, and he served as its president. He subsequently served as the director of the Breitbart Institute of Physical Culture in New York City, and he founded the Jowett Institute in 1927. He later founded the Body Sculpture Club in England. By 1955, he was described in Muscle Builder magazine as "The Father of American Weightlifting."

Jowett joined the staff of Strength magazine in the early 1920s. Bob Hoffman recruited Jowett to work on his new weightlifting magazine, Strength & Health, in 1932, and he took responsibility for most of the editorial work. He left the magazine in 1934, upset at Hoffman's support of the competing Amateur Athletic Union over Jowett's ACWLA.

With his wife Bessie, Jowett has a daughter, Phyllis. They resided in Riverside Heights, Ontario, Canada. Jowett died in 1969 in Winchester, Ontario, Canada.

== Selected works ==
- Jowett, George F. (1926). The Key to Might and Muscle. Philadelphia: Milo Publishing Company. OCLC 8823080.
- Jowett, George F. (1929). The Strongest Man That Ever Lived. Philadelphia: Milo Publishing Company. OCLC 936928410.
- Jowett, George F. (1938). The Atlas of Anatomy. Philadelphia. OCLC 26675479.
- Jowett, George F. (1938). The Science of Exercise Specialization. Philadelphia. OCLC 26675490.
