= The Jack LaLanne Show =

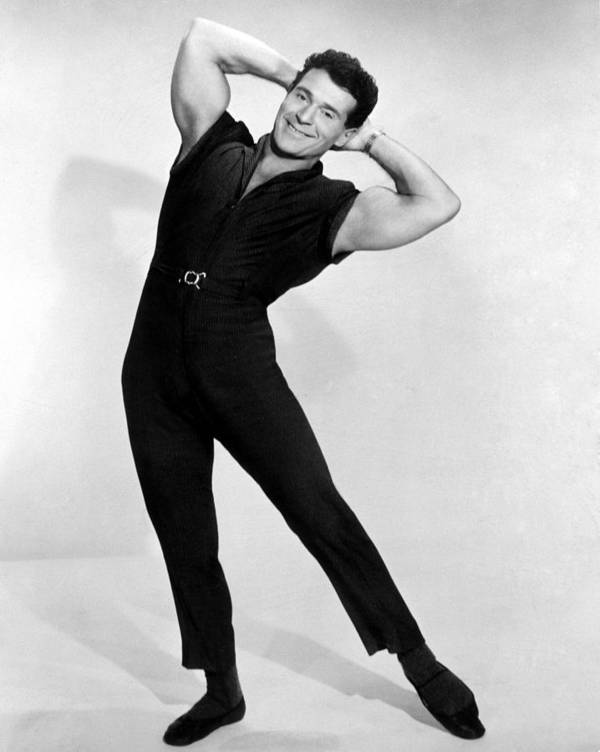
- Jack LaLanne in 1961
- Genre: Exercise, fitness
- Presented by: Jack LaLanne
- Country of origin: United States
- Original language: English

Original release
- Network: KGO-TV (1951–59); Syndication (1959–85)
- Release: 1951 – 1985

The Jack LaLanne Show is an American exercise television show hosted by Jack LaLanne that ran from 1951 to 1985. The 30-minute series was broadcast daily from Mondays through Fridays.

== Background ==
Beginning in 1951, the program was broadcast locally on KGO-TV in San Francisco. After it was picked up for national syndication in 1959, it became the longest-running televised exercise program.

The series had more than 3,000 episodes, which were later shown as reruns on ESPN Classic.

== Format ==
Vincent LoBrutto, in his book, TV in the USA, described LaLanne as "one of early television's great pitchmen", saying that he was "full of charisma and vitality and determined to make everyone look and feel better." He engaged viewers in conversation and used items like rubber cords, chairs, and broomsticks when he needed props for exercises. An organ, similar to the ones heard in baseball stadiums, played background music during his exercise routines.

LaLanne often used his white German shepherd dog, Happy, in his program. The dog's tricks attracted children to the program, so that LaLanne could say to the children: "You go get Mother or Daddy, Grandmother, Grandfather, whoever is in the house. You go get them, and you make sure they exercise with me."

During an audiotaped interview shortly after President Kennedy's assassination, Former First Lady Jacqueline Kennedy said that her husband was a regular viewer of the program during his time in the White House. During the interview, Kennedy made a tongue-in-cheek reference to LaLanne as "that awful exercise man".
