= Ottley Russell Coulter =

American strongman

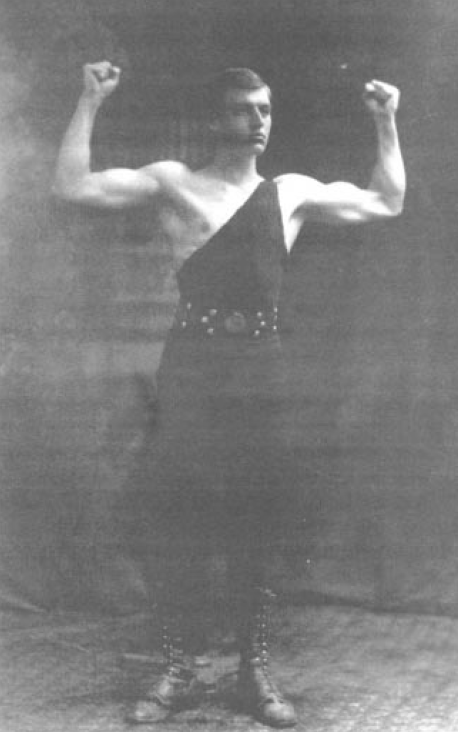
- Coulter in 1911
- Born: June 6, 1890; Parkman, Ohio, U.S.
- Died: December 17, 1976; Lemont Furnace, Pennsylvania, U.S.
- Education: Hiram College
- Occupation(s): Strongman, weightlifter, police officer
- Spouse: Ethel Alexander
- Children: 3

Ottley Russell Coulter (June 6, 1890 - December 17, 1976) was an American strongman, circus performer, weightlifter and police officer. He was a co-founder of the American Continental Weightlifting Association, and the author of a book about strength athletics.

== Early life ==
Coulter was born on June 6, 1890, in Parkman, Ohio. He attended Hiram College for two years and dropped out.

== Career ==
Coulter began his career as a circus performer from 1912 to 1916, including for the Ringling Bros. and Barnum & Bailey Circus. He also worked for US Steel. In the late 1910s, he became a municipal police officer in Lemont Furnace, Pennsylvania. To discourage the use of firearms, Coulter taught hand-to-hand combat in the police department.

An early bodybuilder, Coulter was also a wrestler and powerlifter. In the 1920s, he co-founded the American Continental Weightlifting Association with George F. Jowett and David P. Willoughby. He was an early proponent of tracking progress in the performance of weight-lifters. Coulter wrote articles in Strength, a magazine published by Alan Calvert, in the 1920s. In 1952, he authored of a book about strength athletics.

== Personal life and death ==
Coulter collected books and magazines related to physical culture. His collection is stored at the H.J. Lutcher Stark Center for Physical Culture and Sports.

With his Scottish-born wife née Ethel Alexander, Coulter had three children. They resided in Lemont Furnace. His wife predeceased him in 1972.

Coulter died on December 17, 1976, in Lemont Furnace, at age 86. He was buried in the Sylvan Heights Cemetery.

== Selected works ==
- Coulter, Ottley R. (1952). How to Perform Strongman Stunts.
