= Thomas Rosandich =

American sports personality (?–2020)

Thomas P. Rosandich (died 2020) was an American sports administrator and coach.

== Biography ==
Rosandich career began in the early 1950s, with his involvement in football and track and field coaching, which earned him induction into the Helms Track and Field Hall of Fame. Among the athletes he coached were notable Olympic and world record holders such as Bob Mathias, Josh Culbreath, Al Cantello, and Bob Gutowski.

In addition to his coaching roles, Rosandich served as a Sports Ambassador for the United States Department of State, where he was tasked with building international relations through sport in 43 nations. During his time in the Marine Corps, he led the national team of then-Malaya to international competitions and was later appointed as the National Track and Field coach for Indonesia. During his tenure in Indonesia, Rosandich contributed to the establishment of the Southeast Asian Games.

Following his overseas assignments, Rosandich founded the Olympia Sport Village in Upson, Wisconsin, which served as an all-season sports camp. He also founded the Paavo Nurmi Marathon in Hurley, Wisconsin, in 1969.

Rosandich held the position of Athletic Director at both the University of Wisconsin–Parkside and the University of Wisconsin–Milwaukee, where he made contributions to the development of sports facilities and programs.

In response to issues identified in the U.S. Olympic team's performance at the 1972 Munich Games, Rosandich founded the United States Sports Academy in 1972. The Academy expanded its international presence, starting with a contract with the State of Bahrain in 1976 to oversee their national sports programs.

Rosandich also established the Academy's Awards of Sport in 1984 to recognize significant contributions to the sports profession. and in 2017, was inducted into the International Sports Hall of Fame.
