= Anna Hiss =

American physical education teacher (1893–1972)

Anna Hiss (May 11, 1893 – January 28, 1972) was a 20th-century American professor instrumental in improving physical education by professionalizing the field, establishing university degrees, and developing programs for preparing physical education teachers. She was also a professor of physical education at the University of Texas at Austin and older sister of Donald Hiss and Alger Hiss. She was a founder of Delta Kappa Gamma which became an international society for educators.

== Background ==
Anna Hiss was born on May 11, 1893, in Baltimore, Maryland, to Mary "Minnie" Lavinia (née Hughes) and Charles Alger Hiss. She was the eldest of five children: Anna, Mary Ann (1895), Bosley (1900), Alger (1904), and Donald (1906). In 1906, her father committed suicide. In 1926, her brother Bosley Hiss died of Bright's disease. In 1929, her sister Mary Ann committed suicide.

As a child, she attended the Aloha Kanaka camp. She studied at Bryn Mawr School, then Hollins College (1911–1912), and graduated from the Sargent School of Physical Education in Boston (1917).

== Career ==
Hiss taught briefly at the Friends School in Baltimore.

=== UT Austin ===
In 1918, Hiss started teaching at the University of Texas and served there for 36 years until retirement in 1957.

In 1918, her first role was to teach "physical training" to women. In 1921, she received a promotion to director. In 1925, her four-year curriculum to train teachers in women's physical education received approval. By 1948, she had become a full professor. Harry Ransom had her designed professor emeritus upon her retirement.

From 1921 to 1929, she founded sports clubs on campus, including swimming, dance, tennis, horseback riding, fencing, and archery. In the late 1920s, she secured funding for a women's gymnasium, built in 1931. During the 1930s, she administered a three-year course for physical training called "Freshman Fundamentals." She had tennis courts constructed and playing fields for field hockey, archery, golf, and volleyball.

In 1923, she helped found the Texas Athletic Federation of College Women, which she directed for its first four years.

Upon the United States' entry into the Second World War, physical preparation was emphasized at the University of Texas at Austin, with a "War Conditioning Course" offered to male students, covering judo, boxing, wrestling, and grenade throwing. While women were barred from combat roles, Hiss, director of physical training for women at the time, introduced a specialized wartime class. An obstacle course, labeled as the nation's only one designed for women, was constructed beside the Women's Gym. The course featured balance beams, parallel bars, hoops, hanging ropes, and a high fence to enhance strength and stamina.

=== Delta Kappa Gamma ===
Hiss co-founded the Delta Kappa Gamma, a national teachers' honor society.

== Personal life and death ==
Anna Hiss never married.

Hiss continued her higher education, earning a BS from Columbia University (1936) and conducting graduate studies at the University of Colorado, University of Wisconsin, Stanford University, Columbia University, Mills College, and abroad. In 1949, Boston University awarded her an honorary doctorate.

She studiously avoided publicity during the criminal trials against her brother Alger Hiss, an American government official accused in 1948 of having spied for the Soviet Union in the 1930s. During his imprisonment, she was one of only seven people with whom he corresponded.

She did not support intercollegiate sports.

She petitioned to have the Speedway closed through campus.

Anna Hiss died at age 79 on January 28, 1972, at Long Green nursing home in Baltimore.

== Publications ==
Hiss contributed articles to the Journal of Health and Physical Education.

== Awards, honors, legacy ==
In summing up her career, Delta Kappa Gamma stated: "She was instrumental in the establishment of the professional degree for physical education and the program for the preparation of teachers in the physical education field."

- 1949: Honorary Doctorate from Boston University
- 1974: Anna Hiss Gymnasium at the University of Texas at Austin renamed as such in her honor. The H.J. Lutcher Stark Center for Physical Culture and Sports was initially housed there, but moved to a 27,500-square-foot (2,550 m^{2}) facility on the 5th floor of the new North End Zone structure of Darrell K Royal–Texas Memorial Stadium in 2008.

== See also ==
- Alger Hiss
- Donald Hiss
