= James J. Lorimer =

American attorney and mayor (1926–2022)

Jim Lorimer (October 7, 1926 – November 24, 2022) was an attorney and Special Agent of the F.B.I. who organized the Arnold Sports Festival since 1989. Lorimer served as Mayor and Vice Mayor of Worthington, Ohio, for 52 years.

== Early life and education ==
Lorimer was born on October 7, 1926, in Bristol, Pennsylvania. He served in the U.S. Navy during World War II. In 1949, he graduated with a Bachelor of Arts degree from Ursinus College and in 1951, Jim earned a law degree from the Penn State Dickinson School of Law.

== Career ==
Lorimer founded the Ohio Track Club woman's team. He was chair of the US Olympic Committee for Women's Sports. He worked as an FBI agent and an executive at Nationwide Insurance.

== Personal life and death ==
In 1949, Lorimer married Martha Jean Whittaker. They had three children and four grandchildren. He died on November 24, 2022, at the age of 96.

== Awards and honors ==
In 2005 Iron Man awarded Lorimer its Lifetime Achievement Award. In 2002, he received the Arnold Schwarzenegger Classic Lifetime Achievement Award and in 2012, was inducted into the International Sports Hall of Fame.
