= Elaine LaLanne =

American fitness and nutrition guru (born 1926)

- Born: Elaine Doyle; March 19, 1926 (age 100); Minneapolis, Minnesota, U.S.
- Other name: First Lady of Fitness
- Occupation: Fitness expert
- Spouse: Jack LaLanne

Elaine LaLanne (née Doyle; born March 19, 1926), also known as Lala LaLanne, is American fitness and nutrition guru and author. She is nicknamed the First Lady of Fitness.

== Life and career ==
Elaine Doyle was born in Minneapolis, Minnesota on March 19, 1926. She was married to fellow fitness guru Jack LaLanne until his death in 2011. Elaine has stated that prior to meeting Jack at the age of 27, she "never exercised" and had lived on a diet of "chocolate doughnuts, candy, soda, frankfurters and ice cream for years". She was inducted into the National Fitness Hall of Fame in 2017. As of October 2023, aged 97, LaLanne was still exercising every day in her home gym.

== Bibliography ==
- Fitness After Fifty (1986, revised version 1989)
- Dynastride! Elaine LaLanne's Complete Walking Program for Fitness After 50 (1988)
- Eating Right for a New You: Peak Nutrition for Fitness After Fifty (1992)
- Total Juicing: Over 125 Healthful and Delicious Ways to Use Fresh Fruit and Vegetable Juices and Pulp (1992)
- If You Want to Live, Move!: Putting the Boom Back Into Boomers (2019)
- Pride & Discipline: The Legacy of Jack LaLanne (2022)
