= H.J. Lutcher Stark Center for Physical Culture and Sports =

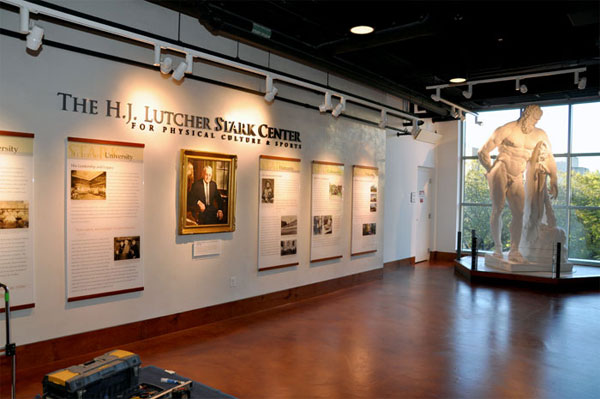
H.J. Lutcher Stark Center for Physical Culture and Sports Entrance

H.J. Lutcher Stark Center for Physical Culture and Sports is the world's foremost archive and museum dedicated to the study and preservation of the world of physical culture. It is located at the University of Texas at Austin. Through the donations of the Nelda C. and H.J. Lutcher Stark Foundation and the Betty and Joe Weider Foundation, the Stark Center opened in 2009, providing access to the center's extensive collection of materials on weight training, bodybuilding, athletic conditioning, alternative medicine, and other forms of self-improvement. The collection, considered the largest of its kind, comprises thousands of books and magazines, an extensive photograph collection, correspondence files, posters, videotapes, films, and artifacts. The center's directors, Drs. Jan and Terry Todd, both former powerlifting athletes, are committed to preserving the history of physical culture.

Although the Stark Center's collection is rooted in the study of physical culture, it contains more than 4000 books about competitive sports, thousands of rare photographs of athletes, and several hundred magazine titles about sports, including full runs of such magazines as Sports Illustrated. The Stark Center holdings also include the 2500-volume Edmund Hoffman Golf collection, as well as photographs, artifacts and papers donated by professional golfers Ben Crenshaw and Tom Kite, both alumni from the University of Texas. Another significant sub-collection is an alternative medicine library consisting of the personal libraries of Dr. Christopher Gian-Cursio, Dr. Jesse Mercer Gehman, and Dr. Herbert Shelton, all of whom were naturopathic physicians in the early 20th century. The Stark Center also owns a substantial collection of art, all of which illustrate the strong bond between physical culture and the art of the human form. One of the showpieces of this collection, and the symbol of the center, is the 10’6” plaster replica of the Farnese Hercules, known for its outstanding musculature.

== Origins ==
Dr. Terry Todd began collecting books and magazines in the field of physical culture in the late 1950s. As a doctoral student at the University of Texas, he was encouraged in this effort by his weightlifting coach, Professor Roy J. McLean, who eventually created the Stark Center's first endowment, which became known in the mid-1980s as the Todd-McLean Physical Culture Collection. In the mid-1960s, Todd met Ottley Coulter, a former circus strongman who by then had accumulated what many experts believed was the largest collection of materials in this field in the United States. Coulter allowed Todd to use this collection for his research, and they became friends. In 1975, after Coulter's death, the Todds (Terry and his wife Jan) were given the first option to purchase his collection, which they accepted.

The Todds joined the faculty at the University of Texas in 1983, bringing with them their collections of books, materials, photographs, and artifacts, and a goal to preserve the history of physical culture. The Todds continued to accumulate more materials for their collection—described in 1999 by sport historian John Fair as “the single most important archive in the world” in this field.

== Facility ==
Initially housed in Anna Hiss Gym, the Stark Center moved to a 27,500-square-foot (2,550 m^{2}) facility on the 5th floor of the new North End Zone structure of Darrell K Royal–Texas Memorial Stadium in 2008. The Stark Center library has almost 15,000 linear feet (over two miles) of “compact shelving”, allowing for the storage of twice as much material as can be stored on traditional library shelves.

The Stark Center encompasses the following:

- The Joe and Betty Weider Physical Culture Museum—a 10,000-square-foot (930 m^{2}) gallery space featuring permanent, rotating, and interactive exhibits related to physical fitness, weight training, health promotion, aerobic exercise and so on;
- The Reading Room – a large and comfortable room where students, faculty and visitors may read, study, or browse through the center's collection of current books and magazines;
- The Center Archives—an access-controlled area housing the Todd-McLean Physical Culture Collection, other related collections, and books, magazines, and materials dealing with general sports;
- The Art Gallery—a public space housing permanent and rotating exhibits of sculpture and original paintings in the area of physical culture and sport.

In addition, the Stark Center includes a large seminar/conference room, nine staff offices, a controlled research area where rare books and photographs can be examined by visitors, and a cataloguing and processing room.
