= Jack LaLanne =

American fitness and nutrition guru and motivational speaker (1914–2011)

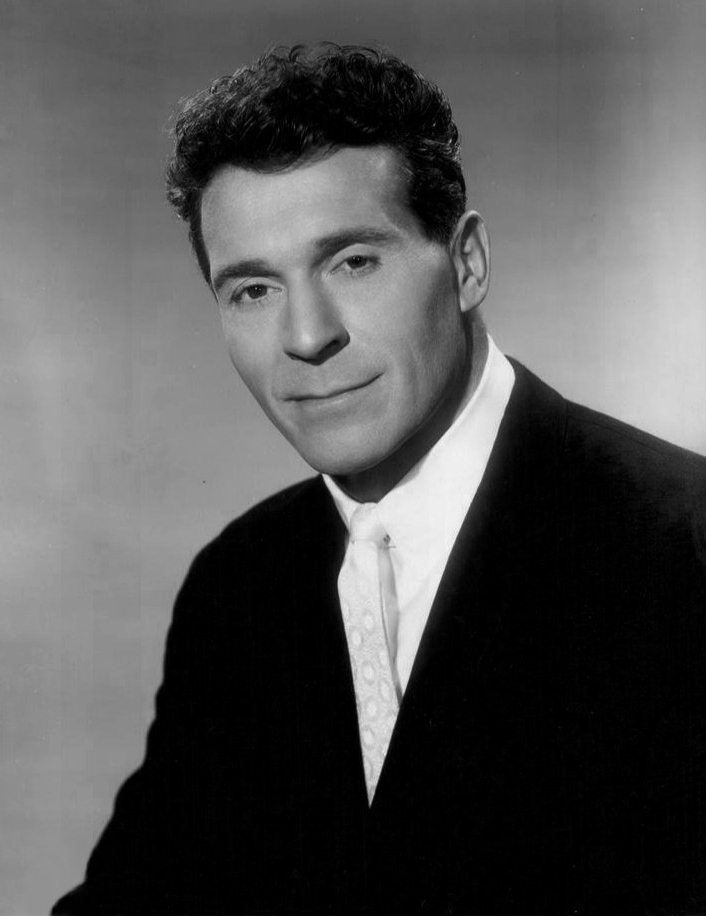
- LaLanne in 1961
- Born: Francois Henri LaLanne; September 26, 1914; San Francisco, California, U.S.
- Died: January 23, 2011 (aged 96); Morro Bay, California, U.S.
- Resting place: Forest Lawn Memorial Park, Hollywood Hills, California, U.S.
- Occupations: Fitness expert; television host; inventor; entrepreneur; motivational speaker
- Years active: 1936–2009
- Television: The Jack LaLanne Show
- Height: 5 ft 6 in (1.68 m)
- Spouses: Irma Navarre (m. 1942; div. 1948) Elaine Doyle (m. 1959)
- Children: 4 (2 biological)
- Website: Official website

Francois Henri "Jack" LaLanne (/ləˈleɪn/; September 26, 1914 – January 23, 2011) was an American fitness and nutrition guru and motivational speaker. He described himself as being a "sugarholic" and a "junk food junkie" until he was 15 years old. He also had behavioral problems but "turned his life around" after listening to a public lecture about the benefits of good nutrition by health food pioneer Paul Bragg. During his career, he came to believe that the country's overall health depended on the health of its population, and he referred to physical culture and nutrition as "the salvation of America". He was nicknamed the "Godfather of Fitness".

LaLanne hosted the first and longest-running nationally syndicated fitness television program, The Jack LaLanne Show, from 1951 to 1985. He published numerous books on fitness and was widely recognized for publicly preaching the health benefits of regular exercise and a good diet. He started working out with weights when they were an oddity. As early as 1936, at the age of 21, he opened the nation's first modern health club in Oakland, California, which became a prototype for dozens of similar gyms bearing his name, later licensing them to Bally.

One of LaLanne's 1950s television exercise programs was aimed toward women, whom he also encouraged to join his health clubs. He invented a number of exercise machines, including the pulley and leg extension devices and the Smith machine, as well as protein supplement drinks, resistance bands, and protein bars. He also popularized juicing and the jumping jack. He produced his own series of videos so viewers could be coached virtually. He pioneered coaching the elderly and disabled to exercise in order to enhance their strength and health.

LaLanne also gained recognition for his success as a bodybuilder and for his prodigious feats of strength. At the age of 70, handcuffed and shackled, he towed 70 boats, carrying a total of 70 people, a mile and a half through Long Beach Harbor. Steve Reeves credited LaLanne as his inspiration to build his muscular physique while keeping a slim waist. Arnold Schwarzenegger, as governor of California, placed him on his Governor's Council on Physical Fitness, and on the occasion of LaLanne's death he credited LaLanne for being "an apostle for fitness" by inspiring "billions all over the world to live healthier lives".

LaLanne was inducted into the California Hall of Fame and has a star on the Hollywood Walk of Fame.

== Early life ==
LaLanne was born in San Francisco, California, the son of Jennie (née Garaig) and Jean/John LaLanne, French immigrants from Oloron-Sainte-Marie. Both entered the US in the 1880s as young children at the Port of New Orleans. LaLanne had two older brothers, Ervil, who died in childhood (1906–1911), and Norman (1908–2005), who nicknamed him "Jack".

He grew up in Bakersfield, California, and later moved with his family to Berkeley, California, circa 1928. In 1939, his father died at the age of 58 in a San Francisco hospital, which LaLanne attributed to "coronary thrombosis and cirrhosis of the liver". In his book The Jack LaLanne Way to Vibrant Health, LaLanne wrote that as a boy he was addicted to sugar and junk food. He had violent episodes directed against himself and others, describing himself as "a miserable kid ... it was like hell".

Besides having a bad temper, LaLanne also suffered from headaches and bulimia, and temporarily dropped out of high school at the age of 14. The following year, aged 15, he heard health food pioneer Paul Bragg give a talk on health and nutrition, focusing on the "evils of meat and sugar". Bragg's message had a powerful influence on LaLanne, who then changed his life and started focusing on his diet and exercise. In his own words, he was "born again". He also began exercising daily (although while serving during World War II as a Pharmacist Mate First Class at the Sun Valley Naval Convalescent Hospital, LaLanne stated that he started bodybuilding at "age 13"). Describing his change of diet, LaLanne stated, "I had to take my lunch alone to the football field to eat so no one would see me eat my raw veggies, whole bread, raisins and nuts. You don't know the crap I went through".

Writer Hal Reynolds, who interviewed LaLanne in 2008, noted that he became an avid swimmer and trained with weights.

[LaLanne] found two men working out in a back room, who kept weights in a locked box. When he asked them if he could use their weights, they laughed at him and said, "Kid, you can't even lift those weights." So he challenged them both to a wrestling match with the bet that if he could beat them, they would give him a key to the box. After he beat them both, they gave him a key and he used their weights until he was able to buy his own.

LaLanne went back to school, where he made the high school football team. He later attended college in San Francisco where he earned a Doctor of Chiropractic degree. He studied Henry Gray's Anatomy of the Human Body and concentrated on bodybuilding and weightlifting.

== Fitness career ==
=== Early wrestling career ===
LaLanne won the American Athletic Foundation Wrestling Championship in 1930 and the American Athletic Union medal for wrestling in 1936. He was put on the 1936 Olympic wrestling team but was taken off the team because he was "charging money for exercise" by opening a gym and thus "considered a professional".

=== Health clubs ===
Arnold Schwarzenegger said of Lalanne, "It doesn't matter where you go, there's a health club, and it all started with Jack LaLanne."

In 1936, he opened the nation's first health and fitness club in Oakland, California, where he offered supervised weight and exercise training and gave nutritional advice. His primary goal was to encourage and motivate his clients to improve their overall health. Doctors, however, advised their patients to stay away from his health club, a business totally unheard of at the time, and warned their patients that "LaLanne was an exercise 'nut', whose programs would make them 'muscle-bound' and cause severe medical problems". LaLanne recalls the initial reaction of doctors to his promotion of weight lifting:

People thought I was a charlatan and a nut. The doctors were against me‍—‌they said that working out with weights would give people heart attacks and they would lose their sex drive.

LaLanne designed the first leg extension machines, pulley machines using cables, weight selectors, and many other inventions, none of which he patented, that are now standard in the fitness industry. He invented the original model of what became the Smith machine. He invented resistance bands, which he marketed as the Glamour Stretcher for women and the Easy Way for men with different tensions. LaLanne encouraged women to lift weights (though at the time it was thought this would make women look masculine and unattractive), and he was the first to have a coed health club. By the 1980s, Jack LaLanne's European Health Spas numbered more than 200. He eventually licensed all his health clubs to the Bally company, now known as Bally Total Fitness. Though not associated with any gym, LaLanne continued to lift weights until his death.

=== Books, television and other media ===
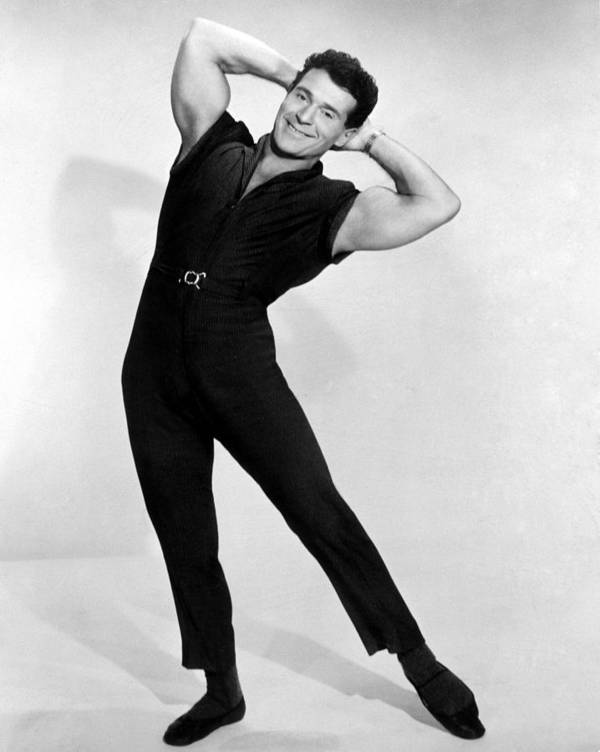
Jack LaLanne in 1961

LaLanne presented fitness and exercise advice on television for 34 years. The Jack LaLanne Show was the longest-running television exercise program. According to the SF Chronicle TV program archives, it first began on 28 September 1953 as a 15-minute local morning program (sandwiched between the morning news and a cooking show) on San Francisco's ABC television station, KGO-TV, with LaLanne paying for the airtime himself as a way to promote his gym and related health products. LaLanne also met his wife Elaine while she was working for the local station. In 1959, the show was picked up for nationwide syndication, and continued until 1985.

The show was noted for its minimalist set, where LaLanne inspired his viewers to use basic home objects, such as a chair, to perform their exercises along with him. Wearing his standard jumpsuit, he urged his audience "with the enthusiasm of an evangelist," to get off their couch and copy his basic movements, a manner considered the forerunner of today's fitness videos. In 1959, LaLanne recorded Glamour Stretcher Time, a workout album that provided phonograph-based instruction for exercising with an elastic cord called the Glamour Stretcher.

As a daytime show, much of LaLanne's audience were stay-at-home mothers. LaLanne's wife Elaine LaLanne was part of the show to demonstrate the exercises and to show that doing them would not ruin the figures or musculature of women. LaLanne also included his dog Happy as a way to attract children to the show. Later in the run, another dog named Walter was used, with LaLanne claiming "Walter" stood for "We All Love To Exercise Regularly".

LaLanne published several books and videos on fitness and nutrition, appeared in movies, and recorded a song with Connie Haines. He marketed exercise equipment, a range of vitamin supplements, and two models of electric juicers. These include the "Juice Tiger", as seen on Amazing Discoveries with Mike Levey, and "Jack LaLanne's Power Juicer". It was on the show that LaLanne introduced the phrase "That's the power of the juice!". However, in March 1996, 70,000 Juice Tiger juicers, 9% of all its models, were recalled after 14 injury incidents were reported. The Power Juicer is still sold in five models.

LaLanne played the role of "Hercules" in the Christmas television movie, "The Year Without a Santa Claus" starring John Goodman, in 2006, his last acting role.

LaLanne celebrated his 95th birthday with the release of a new book titled Live Young Forever.

== Personal health routine ==
=== Diet ===
One of LaLanne's sayings was "If man made it, don't eat it."

LaLanne blamed heavily processed foods for many health problems. For most of his life, he eschewed sugar and white flour while eating many fruits and vegetables, and he ate a mostly dairy-free and a pescatarian diet that included lots of egg whites and fish. He also took vitamin supplements and protein supplements. The New York Times reported in his obituary that he avoided snacks and ate two meals a day, although he once said that he ate three meals a day.

His breakfast, after working out for two hours, consisted of hard-boiled egg whites, a cup of broth, oatmeal with soy milk, and seasonal fruit. Other sources say that breakfasts were homemade protein shakes: one was a protein powder shake with wheat germ, brewer's yeast, bone meal, juice, and handfuls of vitamins and minerals consisting of "100 liver-yeast tablets, 15,000 milligrams of vitamin C, 2000 units of B, some boron and some zinc, also 75 alfalfa and kelp tablets".

Another shake LaLanne consumed consisted of egg whites and soybean with carrot juice, celery juice, and some fruit. One source reported that his lunch was four boiled egg whites, five servings of fresh fruit, plus five raw vegetables. For dinner, he and his wife typically ate a high-protein salad with egg whites along with fish (often salmon) and some wine. He did not drink coffee.

He once described his diet by saying, "At least eight to 10 raw vegetables and three to four pieces of fresh fruit a day. I have natural grains, beans, brown rice, lentils, wheat. And I get most of my protein from fish and egg whites. I eat no meat of any kind. I drink my breakfast. Half carrot juice, half celery juice and then I put an apple and a banana in it and 50 grams of protein made out of egg whites and soybean. For lunch I'll have three pieces of fresh fruit, three to six egg whites and whole wheat toast. And Elaine makes soup for me with vegetables but no cream or butter. Elaine and I eat out practically every night, but we have the restaurants trained. We call them that we're coming in, and they'll have a raw vegetable salad and I'll have oil dressing loaded up with chopped garlic. I take my own pita bread made out of whole wheat with no salt or oils. And I'll have a baked potato and fish."

=== Exercise ===
When exercising, LaLanne worked out repetitively with weights until he experienced "muscle fatigue" in whatever muscle groups he was exercising, or when it became impossible for him to go on with a particular routine; this is most often referred to as "training to failure". LaLanne moved from exercise to exercise without stopping. To contradict critics who thought this would leave him tightly musclebound and uncoordinated, LaLanne liked to demonstrate one-handed balancing. His home contained two gyms and a pool that he used daily.

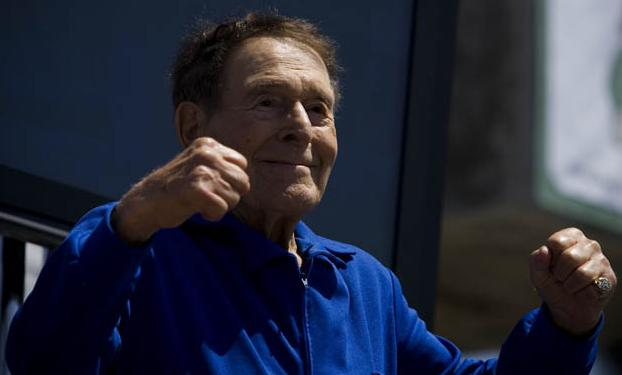
LaLanne receiving a Lifetime Achievement Award in 2007 at Muscle Beach in Venice Beach, California

He continued with his two-hour workouts into his 90s, which also included walking. He stated, "If I died, people would say 'Oh look, Jack LaLanne died. He didn't practice what he preached.'"

LaLanne summed up his philosophy about good nutrition and exercise:

"Dying is easy. Living is a pain in the butt. It's like an athletic event. You've got to train for it. You've got to eat right. You've got to exercise. Your health account, your bank account, they're the same thing. The more you put in, the more you can take out. Exercise is king and nutrition is queen: together, you have a kingdom."

He said that since the average person doesn't have the time to exercise two hours per day, he recommended 30-minute workouts, 3-4 times a week, and changing one's routine every 2–3 weeks.

=== Views on food additives and drugs ===
LaLanne often stressed that artificial food additives, drugs, and processed foods contributed to making people mentally and physically ill. As a result, he writes, many people turn to alcohol and drugs to deal with symptoms of ailments, noting that "a stream of aches and pains seems to encompass us as we get older". He refers to the human bloodstream as a "River of Life", which is "polluted" by "junk foods" loaded with "preservatives, salt, sugar, and artificial flavorings".

Relying on evidence from The President's Council on Physical Fitness, he also agreed that "many of our aches and pains come from lack of physical activity". As an immediate remedy for symptoms such as constipation, insomnia, tiredness, anxiety, shortness of breath, or high blood pressure, LaLanne states that people will resort to various drugs: "We look for crutches such as sleeping pills, pep pills, alcohol, cigarettes, and so on."

== Family ==
LaLanne was married to his second wife, Elaine Doyle LaLanne, for more than five decades. They had four children between the two of them: Yvonne LaLanne, a daughter from his first marriage; Janet Doyle and Dan Doyle, a daughter and son, respectively, from Elaine's first marriage; and Jon LaLanne, a son they had together. Yvonne is a chiropractor in California; Dan and Jon are involved in the family business, BeFit Enterprises, which they and their mother and sister plan to continue. Elaine's daughter from her first marriage, Janet Doyle, died in a car accident at age 21 in 1974.

== Death ==
LaLanne often said, "I can never die; that would ruin my image!" He died of respiratory failure due to pneumonia at his home on January 23, 2011. He was 96. According to his family, he had been sick for a week but refused to see a doctor. They added that he had been performing his daily workout routine the day before his death. He is buried at Forest Lawn Memorial Park in Hollywood Hills, California.

== LaLanne's feats ==
(As reported on Jack LaLanne's website)

- 1954 (age 40) – Swam the entire 8,981-foot (1.7 mi; 2.7 km) length of the Golden Gate in San Francisco, under water, with 140 lb (64 kg; 10 st) of air tanks and other equipment strapped to his body; a world record.
- 1955 (age 41) – Swam from Alcatraz Island to Pier 43 in San Francisco while handcuffed. When interviewed afterwards, he was quoted as saying that the worst thing about the ordeal was being handcuffed, which significantly reduced his ability to do a jumping jack.
- 1956 (age 42) – Set what was claimed as a world record of 1,033 push-ups in 23 minutes on You Asked For It, a television program hosted by Art Baker.
- 1957 (age 43) – Swam the Golden Gate channel while towing a 2,500 lb (1,130 kg; 180 st) cabin cruiser. The swift ocean currents turned this one-mile (1.6 km) swim into a swimming distance of 6.5 miles (10.5 km).
- 1958 (age 44) – Maneuvered a paddleboard nonstop from Farallon Islands to the San Francisco shore. The 30-mile (48 km) trip took 9.5 hours.
- 1959 (age 45) – Did 1,000 push-ups and 1,000 chin-ups in 1 hour, 22 minutes, to promote The Jack LaLanne Show going nationwide. LaLanne said this was the most difficult of his stunts, but only because the skin on his hands started ripping off during the chin-ups. He felt he couldn't stop because it would have been seen as a public failure.
- 1974 (age 60) – For the second time, he swam from Alcatraz Island to Fisherman's Wharf. Again, he was handcuffed, but this time he was also shackled and towed a 1,000 lb (450 kg; 71 st) boat, according to his obituary in Los Angeles Times in 2011 and his website. However, according to an account of this event published the day after it occurred in the Los Angeles Times, written by Philip Hager, a Times staff writer, LaLanne was neither handcuffed nor shackled if each of those terms has the conventional meaning of "tightly binding the wrists or ankles together with a pair of metal fasteners". Hager says that LaLanne "had his hands and feet bound with cords that allowed minimal freedom". But "minimal" clearly did not mean "no" freedom, since elsewhere in the article Hager describes LaLanne's method of propulsion through the water as "half-breast-stroke, half-dog paddle", which is how you swim with your hands tied.
- 1975 (age 61) – Repeating his performance of 21 years earlier, he again swam the entire length of the Golden Gate Bridge, underwater and handcuffed, but this time he was shackled and towed a 1,000 lb (450 kg; 71 st) boat.
- 1976 (age 62) – To commemorate the "Spirit of '76," United States Bicentennial, he swam one mile (1.6 km) in Long Beach Harbor. He was handcuffed and shackled, and he towed 13 boats (representing the 13 original colonies) containing 76 people.
- 1979 (age 65) – Towed 65 boats in Lake Ashinoko, near Tokyo. He was handcuffed and shackled, and the boats were filled with 6,500 lb (2,950 kg; 460 st) of Louisiana Pacific wood pulp.
- 1980 (age 66) – Towed 10 boats in North Miami, Florida. The boats carried 77 people, and he towed them for over one mile (1.6 km) in less than one hour.
- 1984 (age 70) – He towed 70 rowboats, one with several guests, from the Queen's Way Bridge in the Long Beach Harbor to the Queen Mary, 1 mile.

== Awards and honors ==
On June 10, 2005, then governor Arnold Schwarzenegger launched the California Governor's Council on Physical Fitness and Sport. In his address, Schwarzenegger paid special tribute to LaLanne, who he credited with demonstrating the benefits of fitness and a healthy lifestyle for 75 years. In 2008, he inducted LaLanne into the California Hall of Fame and personally gave him an inscribed plaque at a special ceremony.

In 2007, LaLanne was awarded The President's Council's Lifetime Achievement Award. The award is given to "individuals whose careers have greatly contributed to the advancement or promotion of physical activity, fitness, or sports nationwide". Winners are chosen based on the "individual's career, the estimated number of lives the individual has touched through his or her work, the legacy of the individual's work, and additional awards or honors received over the course of his or her career".

=== Other honors ===
- 1963: Founding member of President's Council on Physical Fitness under President Kennedy
- President's Council of Physical Fitness Silver Anniversary Award
- Governor's Council on Physical Fitness Lifetime Achievement Award
- The Horatio Alger Association of Distinguished Americans
- American Academy of Achievement, 1975
- American Cancer Society
- American Heart Association
- American Medical Association
- WBBG Pioneer of Fitness Hall of Fame
- APFC Pioneer of Fitness Hall of Fame
- Patriarch Society of Chiropractors
- NFLA – Healthy American Fitness Award
- Received an Award from the Oscar Heidenstam Foundation Hall of Fame
- Received National Academy of Television Arts & Sciences Gold Circle Award commemorating over 50 years in the Television Industry
- IHRSA Person of the Year Award
- Jack Webb Award from the Los Angeles Police Historical Society
- Interglobal's International Infomercial Award
- The Freddie, Medical Media Public Service Award
- Freedom Forum Al Neuharth Free Spirit Honoree
- Lifetime Achievement Award from Club Industry
- 1992 (age 78): The Academy of Body Building and Fitness Award
- 1994 (age 80): The State of California Governor's Council on Physical Fitness Lifetime Achievement Award
- 1996 (age 82): The Dwight D. Eisenhower Fitness Award
- 1999 (age 85): The Spirit of Muscle Beach Award
- 2002 (age 88): A star on the Hollywood Boulevard Walk of Fame. At his induction ceremony, LaLanne did pushups on the top of his star.
- 2005 (age 91): The Jack Webb Award from the Los Angeles Police Department Historical Society; the Arnold Classic Lifetime Achievement Award; the Interglobal's International Infomercial Award; the Freddie Award; the Medical Media Public Service Award; Free Spirit honoree at Al Neuharth's Freedom Forum; Inaugural Inductee into the National Fitness Hall of Fame
- 2008 (age 94): Inducted by California Governor Arnold Schwarzenegger (fellow 2005 inductee of the National Fitness Hall of Fame) and Maria Shriver into the California Hall of Fame
- 2012 (posthumously): Together with his wife, inducted into the International Sports Hall of Fame.

== Filmography ==
LaLanne appeared as himself in the following films and television shows:

- You Bet Your Life (1961)
- Peter Gunn (1960) – LaLanne appeared in an episode with Craig Stevens.
- Mister Ed (1961), episode "Psychoanalyst Show" (as "Instructor"), (1963), episode "Doctor Ed"
- The Addams Family (Season 2, 1966), episode "Fester Goes on a Diet"
- Batman (man on roof with girls, uncredited cameo) (1966)
- Here's Lucy (Season 2, 1969), episode "Lucy and the Bogie Affair"
- Rowan & Martin's Laugh-In (Episode #5.14, 1971), Guest Performer
- Fit & Fun Time (kids TV pilot) (1972)
- The Richard Simmons Show (1982)
- The Chevy Chase Show
- Repossessed (1990)
- Amazing Discoveries (1991)
- The Simpsons (Season 10, 1999), episode "The Old Man and the 'C' Student"
- Beefcake (1999)
- Hollywood's Magical Island: Catalina (2003)
- "Mostly True Stories: Urban Legends Revealed" (2004)
- Penn & Teller: Bullshit! (Season 2, 2004)
- The Year Without a Santa Claus (2006), Hercules
- "How To Live Forever" (Documentary, 2009)
