= Sports nutrition =

Study and practice of nutrition to improve performance

Nutrition is important in all sports

Sports nutrition is the study and practice of nutrition and diet for maintaining and improving athletic performance. Nutrition is part of many sports training regimens, being used in strength sports (such as weightlifting and bodybuilding) and endurance sports (e.g., cycling, running, swimming, rowing). Sports nutrition focuses on the type, as well as the quantity, of fluids and food taken by an athlete. It deals with consuming nutrients, such as vitamins, minerals, carbohydrates, proteins, and fats.

== Factors influencing nutritional requirements ==
Differing conditions and objectives suggest the need for athletes to ensure that their sports nutritional approach is appropriate for their situation. Factors that may affect an athlete's nutritional needs include type of activity (aerobic vs. anaerobic), gender, weight, height, body mass index, workout or activity stage (pre-workout, intro-workout, recovery), and time of day.

A nutritious diet will mitigate disturbances in performance. The key to a proper diet is a variety of foods, obtaining a balance of macronutrients, vitamins, and minerals.

=== Gender ===
There are obvious physical differences between male and female anatomy, while physiology is the same for the most part, how they metabolize nutrients will vary. Men have less total body fat but tend to carry most of their fat in the adipose tissue of their abdominal region. Adipose tissue is indirectly mediated by androgen receptors in muscle. On the other hand, women have more total body fat that is carried in the subcutaneous layer of their hip region. Women metabolize glucose by direct and indirect control of expression of enzymes.

=== Anaerobic exercise ===
Weightlifting is an anaerobic exercise

During anaerobic exercise, the process of glycolysis breaks down the sugars from carbohydrates for energy without the use of oxygen. This type of exercise occurs in physical activity such as power sprints, strength resistances and quick explosive movement where the muscles are being used for power and speed, with short-time energy use. After this type of exercise, there is a need to refill glycogen storage sites in the body (the long simple sugar chains in the body that store energy), although they are not likely fully depleted.

To compensate for this glycogen reduction, athletes will often take in large amounts of carbohydrates, immediately following their exercise. Typically, high-glycemic-index carbohydrates are preferred for their ability to rapidly raise blood glucose levels. For the purpose of protein synthesis, protein or individual amino acids are ingested as well. Branched-chain amino acids are important since they are most responsible for the synthesis of protein. According to Lemon et al. (1995) female endurance runners have the hardest time getting enough protein in their diet. Endurance athletes in general need more protein in their diet than the sedentary person. Research has shown that endurance athletes are recommended to have 1.2 to 1.4 g of protein per kg of body weight in order to repair damaged tissue. If the athlete consumes too few calories for the body's needs, lean tissue will be broken down for energy and repair. Protein deficiency can cause many problems such as early and extreme fatigue, particularly long recovery, and poor wound healing. Complete proteins such as meat, eggs, and soy provide the athlete with all essential amino acids for synthesizing new tissues. However, vegetarian and vegan athletes frequently combine legumes with a whole grain to provide the body with a complete protein across the day's food intake. A popular combination being rice and beans.

Spada's research on endurance sports nutrition (2000) and where the types of carbohydrates come from will be explained. He advises for carbohydrates to be unprocessed and/or whole grains for optimal performance while training. These carbohydrates offer the most fuel, nutritional value, and satiety. Fruits and vegetables contribute important carbohydrate foundation for an athlete's diet. They provide vitamins and minerals that are lost through exercise and later needed to be replenished. Both fruits and vegetables improve healing, aid in recovery, and reduce risks of cancer, high blood pressure, and constipation. Vegetables offer a little more nutritional value than fruits for the amount of calories, therefore an athlete should strive to eat more vegetables than fruits. Dark-colored vegetables usually have more nutritional value than pale colored ones. A general rule is the darker the color the more nutrient dense it is. Like all foods, it is very important to have a variety. To get the most nutritional value out of fruits and vegetables it is important to eat them in their natural, unprocessed form without added nutrients or sugar.

Often in the continuation of this anaerobic exercise, the product from this metabolic mechanism builds up in what is called lactic acid fermentation. Lactate is produced more quickly than it is being removed and it serves to regenerate NAD^{+} cells on where it's needed. During intense exercise when oxygen is not being used, a high amount of ATP is produced and pH levels fall causing acidosis or more specifically lactic acidosis. Lactic acid build up can be treated by staying well-hydrated throughout and especially after the workout, having an efficient cool down routine and good post-workout stretching.

Intense activity can cause significant and permanent damage to bodily tissues. In order to repair, vitamin E and other antioxidants are needed to protect muscle damage. Oxidation damage and muscle tissue breakdown happens during endurance running so athletes need to eat foods high in protein in order to repair these muscle tissues. It is important for female endurance runners to consume proper nutrients in their diet that will repair, fuel, and minimize fatigue and injury. To keep a female runner's body performing at its best, the ten nutrients need to be included in their diets.

=== Aerobic Exercise ===
Aerobic exercise is also known as cardio because it is a form of cardiovascular conditioning. This includes exercises such as running, cycling, swimming and rowing. Athletes involved in aerobic exercise are typically looking to increase their endurance. These athletes are training their slow twitch muscle fibers to be better at taking in oxygen and getting it to their muscles. This is done by two mechanisms, glycolysis and aerobic respiration. Anaerobic glycolysis is also referred to as the "short term energy system", and is mostly used for high-intensity training, such as sprinting, and any sports which require quick bursts of speed. Slow twitch muscles are smaller in diameter and are slow to contract. These fibers don't store much glycogen, instead they use lipids and amino acids to generate energy. It has been shown that amino acids contributed around 3% of the total energy expenditure during endurance exercise. With a high concentration of myoglobin that stores oxygen, the slow twitch muscle fibers have plenty of oxygen to function properly. These factors help make slow twitch muscle fibers fatigue resistant so athletes can have endurance in their sport. There are many options for supplements that athletes can take to assist with endurance like glycerol and guarana.

== Supplements ==
Dietary supplements contain one or more dietary ingredients (including vitamins; minerals; amino acids; herbs or other botanicals; and other substances) or their constituents is intended to be taken by mouth as a pill, capsule, tablet, or liquid. Athletes may choose to take dietary supplements to assist in improving their athletic performance. Many other supplements exist, including performance enhancing supplements (steroids, blood doping, creatine, human growth hormone), energy supplements (caffeine), and supplements that aid in recovery (protein, BCAAs).

=== Energy supplements ===
Athletes sometimes turn to energy supplements to increase their ability to exercise more often. Common supplements to increase an athlete's energy include: Caffeine, Guarana, Vitamin B12, and Asian ginseng. Guarana is another supplement that athletes take to enhance their athletic ability, it is frequently used for weight loss and as an energy supplement.

Caffeine, a common energy supplement, can be found in many different forms such as pills, tablets or capsules, and can also be found in common foods, such as coffee and tea. A 2009 study from the University of Texas reports that caffeinated energy drinks increase sporting performance. They found that after drinking an energy drink, 83% of participants improved their physical activity parameters by an average of 4.7%. This was attributed to the effects of caffeine, sucrose and Vitamin B in the drink - however scientific consensus does not support the efficacy of using Vitamin B as a performance enhancer. To explain the performance improvement the writers report an increase in blood levels of epinephrine, norepinephrine and beta-Endorphin. The adenosine receptor antagonism of caffeine accounts for the first two, while the latter is accounted for by the Neurobiological effects of physical exercise.

The effectiveness of caffeine to mask fatigue has been explored since the early 1900s and its use in sports nutrition became popular in the 1970s when this effect became highly recognized. The caffeine found in energy drinks and coffee shows an increased reaction performance and feelings of energy, focus and alertness in quickness and reaction anaerobic power tests. In other words, consuming an energy drink or any drink with caffeine increases short time/rapid exercise performance (like short full-speed sprints and heavy power weight lifting). Caffeine is chemically similar to adenosine, a type of sugar that helps in the regulation of important body processes, including the firing of neurotransmitters. Caffeine takes the place of adenosine in the brain, attaching itself to the same neural receptors affected by adenosine, and causing neurons to fire more rapidly, hence caffeine's stimulating effects.

Carbohydrates are also a very common form of energy supplements, as all sugars are carbohydrates. Products like Gatorade and Powerade are formulated with simple sugars such as sucrose and dextrose. Carbohydrates are necessary as they maintain blood glucose levels and restore muscle glycogen levels.

=== Recovery supplements ===
Common supplements to help athletes recover from exercising include protein and amino acid supplements. The main use for athletes to take dietary proteins are enhance muscle repair and growth. The intake of protein is a part of the nutrient requirements for the normal athlete and is an important component of exercise training. In addition, it aids in performance and recovery. A 2018 meta-review recommended that individuals may take up to 1.6 g/kg/day of protein with a confidence interval spanning from 1.03 to 2.20 so “it may be prudent to recommend ~2.2 g protein/kg/d for those seeking to maximise resistance training-induced gains in FFM.”. FFM is an abbreviation for fat free mass. Dietary protein intake for well-trained athletes should occur before, during and after physical activity as it is advantageous in gaining muscle mass and strength. In healthy individuals with good kidney function there is no evidence that consuming a high protein diet has any deleterious effects. A bountiful protein diet must be paired with a healthy, well-rounded meal plan and regular resistance exercise. Characteristics of this particular diet include the type of exercise, intensity, duration and carbohydrate values of diet.

Post-exercise nutrition is an important factor in a nutrition plan for athletes as it pertains to the recovery of the body. Traditionally, sports drinks such as Gatorade and Powerade, are consumed during and after exercise because they effectively rehydrate the body by refueling the body with carbohydrates, minerals and electrolytes. Electrolytes regulate the body's nerve and muscle function, blood pH, blood pressure, and the rebuilding of damaged tissue. These types of drink are commonly made of the carbohydrates glucose and sucrose in water and has been seen to improve football players' performance.

A substitute for sports drinks is milk, which contains many electrolytes, carbohydrates, and other elements that help to make it a more effective post-exercise beverage than traditional sports drinks. It is true that milk helps replace fluids and electrolytes lost after the athlete has worked out. A recovery drink is supposed to replenish the sugar lost, and help recover the muscles to be able to workout at full intensity by the next time they workout. When compared to plain water or sports drinks, research supported by the Dairy and Nutrition Council suggests that chocolate milk is more effective at replacing fluids lost through sweat and maintaining normal body fluid levels. Athletes drinking chocolate milk following exercise-induced dehydration had fluid levels about 2 percent higher (on initial body mass) than those using other post-exercise recovery beverages. These results allowed for prolonged performance, especially in repeated bouts of exercise or training.

=== Performance-enhancing substances ===
In the extreme case of performance-enhancing substances, athletes, particularly bodybuilders may choose to use illegal substances such as anabolic steroids. These compounds which are related to the hormone testosterone, can quickly build mass and strength, but have many adverse effects such as high blood pressure and negative gender specific effects. Blood doping, another illegal ergogenic, was discovered in the 1940s when it was used by World War II pilots. Blood doping also known as blood transfusions, increases oxygen delivery to exercising tissues and has been demonstrated to improve performance in endurance sports, such as long-distance cycling. Blood doping is banned by International Olympic Committee and other International Sport Authorities and Federations.

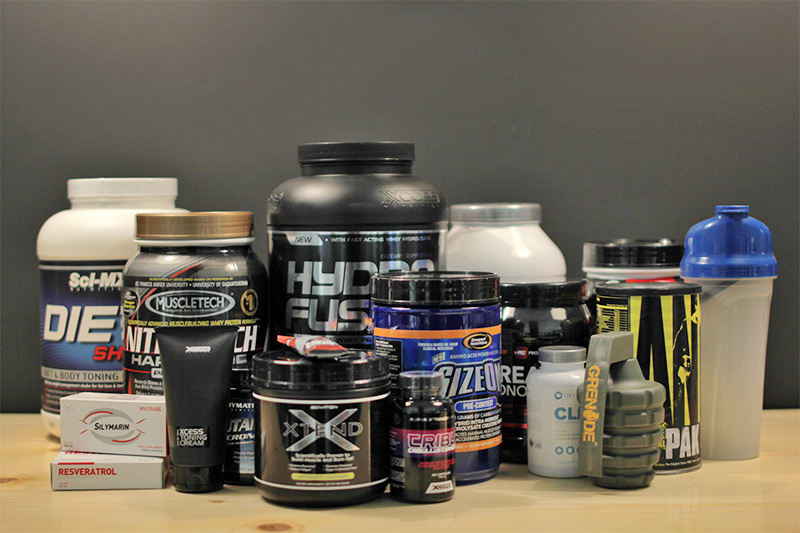
An assortment of supplements.

The supplement creatine may be helpful for well-trained athletes to increase exercise performance and strength in relation with their dietary regimen.

Other popular studies done on supplements include androstenedione, chromium, and ephedra. The findings show that there are no substantial benefits from the extra intake of these supplements, yet higher health risks and costs.

== See also ==
- Category:Dietary supplements
- Energy bar
- Protein (nutrient)
- Sports drink/Energy drink
- Multivitamin
- Ninja diet
- Bodybuilding
- Bodybuilding supplements
- High-protein diet
- Nutritionist
