= Postal Service Reform Act of 2022 =

United States congressional bill addressing the finances of the US Postal Service

- Long title: An Act to provide stability to and enhance the services of the United States Postal Service, and for other purposes.
- Enacted by: the 117th United States Congress
- Number of co-sponsors: 102

Citations
- Public law: Pub. L. 117–108 (text) (PDF)
- Statutes at Large: 136 Stat. 1127

Codification
- Titles amended: Title 39—Postal Service

Legislative history
- Introduced in the House of Representatives as H.R. 3076 by Carolyn Maloney (D–NY) on May 11, 2021; Committee consideration by House Oversight and Reform, House Energy and Commerce, and House Ways and Means; Passed the House of Representatives on February 8, 2022 (342–92); Passed the Senate on March 8, 2022 (79–19); Signed into law by President Joe Biden on April 6, 2022

The Postal Service Reform Act of 2022 is a federal statute intended to address "the finances and operations of the U.S. Postal Service (USPS)", specifically to lift budget requirements imposed on the Service by the Postal Accountability and Enhancement Act and require it to continue six-day-a-week delivery of mail.

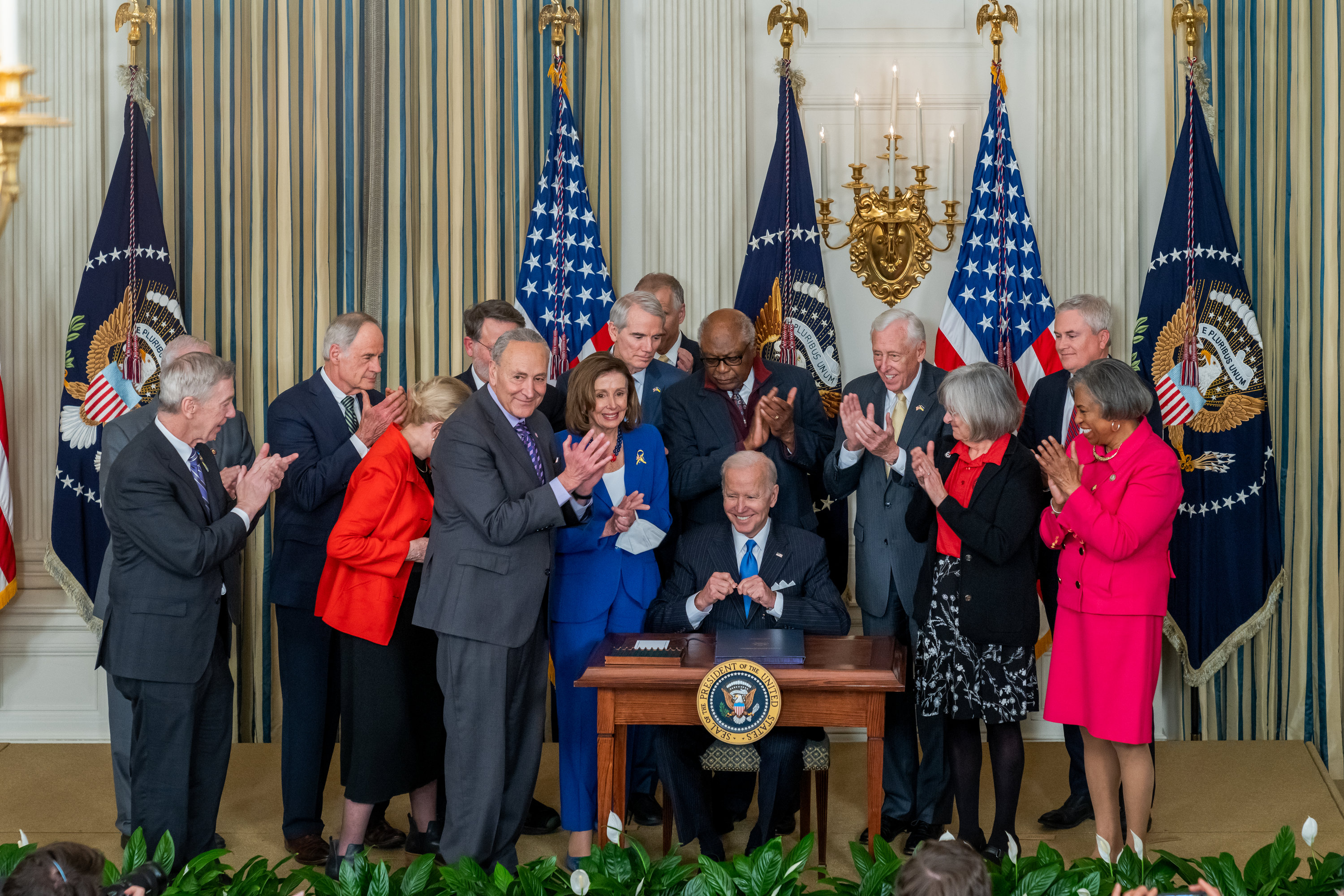
President Joe Biden signs the Postal Service Reform Act in the State Dining Room of the White House on April 6, 2022

The act was introduced on May 11, 2021, by Representative Carolyn Maloney (D-NY). The House of Representatives then passed the bill by 342–92 on February 8, 2022. On March 8, 2022, the Senate voted 79–19 to pass the bill. President Biden signed the bill into law on April 6, 2022.

== Background ==
Similar bills to the Postal Service Reform Act have been proposed in recent years, but none passed. The Postal Accountability and Enhancement Act (PAEA), passed in 2006, required the USPS to pre-fund benefits for future retirees, and this cost the agency about $5.5 billion annually. The PAEA required the USPS to pre-fund these health benefits more than fifty years in advance. This requirement caused the USPS to accumulate billions in debt annually in recent years. The USPS Fairness Act would have allowed the USPS to still continue to pay benefits from the accumulated funding (about $56.8 billion in 2020) until depleted, but the intended purpose of the USPS Fairness Act was to remove the pre-funding requirements placed on the agency by the PAEA. That bill passed in the House (309—106) in 2019 but died in the Senate.

== Provisions ==
The Postal Service Reform Act of 2022:

- Enacts the USPS Fairness Act, eliminating the requirement to pre-fund retiree benefits
- Requires retiring postal employees to enroll in Medicare parts A and B to receive USPS health care benefits
- Requires continued transportation of letters and packages in an integrated network, so growth in package delivery volume benefits first class mail delivery
- Requires delivery of mail six days a week (except federal holidays, emergencies, and areas not scheduled for regular six-day delivery as of April 6, 2022)
- Creates an exception to the PAEA's prohibition of USPS non-postal services by authorizing the USPS to rent property and provide non-postal services for state and local governments (such as processing license and permit transactions) to raise revenue.
- Requires the USPS to set performance targets and publish performance metrics on its website
- Requires the USPS to review cost allocation accounting for its monopoly services
- Reduces mailing fees for rural newspapers
- Requires a study on efficiency of mailing flats
- Requires detailed operational reports to the Postal Regulatory Commission, President, Congress every six months
- Adjusts language concerning standards for choosing mail transportation methods, a provision requested by Republicans in support of Postmaster General Louis DeJoy's decision to end domestic air mail service
- Abolishes the Inspector General of the Postal Regulatory Commission, with its "duties and responsibilities" being assumed by the United States Postal Service Office of Inspector General
