= RVE =

RVE may refer to:

- Radicalization into violent extremism
- Remote Video Encoding
- Representative volume element
- Rotavirus E
