= Click-N-Ship =

United States Postal Service label printing means

Click-N-Ship is a service offered by the United States Postal Service that allows customers to create pre-paid Ground Advantage, Priority Mail, and Priority Mail Express shipping labels on ordinary printer paper at commercial postage rates. (Note: The USPS provides most of the free Flat Rate envelopes and boxes at local post offices. Customers can also order all of the free Flat Rate envelopes and boxes on the USPS website--delivery to the customer is also free.) The labels include delivery confirmation numbers to track date and time of delivery or attempted delivery, as well as the ability to purchase extra services such as signature confirmation and insurance. Other than the cost of postage, there is no fee for creating labels, unless the customer opts to have a pre-printed label delivered to their residence.

After affixing the label, customers may ship a package by depositing it in a USPS collection box, bringing it to a post office, giving it to their regular mail carrier, or requesting a pickup.
