= Postal Accountability and Enhancement Act =

United States federal statute

- Acronyms (colloquial): PAEA
- Enacted by: the 109th United States Congress
- Effective: December 20, 2006

Citations
- Public law: 109-435

Legislative history
- Introduced in the House as the Postal Accountability and Enhancement Act (H.R. 6407) by Tom Davis (R-VA) on December 7, 2006; Committee consideration by House Government Reform Committee; Passed the House on December 8, 2006 (voice vote); Passed the Senate on December 9, 2006 (unanimous consent); Signed into law by President George W. Bush on December 20, 2006

Major amendments
- Postal Service Reform Act of 2022

The Postal Accountability and Enhancement Act (PAEA) or the Postal Act of 2006 is a United States federal statute enacted by the 109th United States Congress and signed into law by President George W. Bush on December 20, 2006. It was meant to overhaul the United States Postal Service (USPS) after a financial crisis affected the Service in 2001. It was the first major overhaul of the USPS since the Service became an independent agency in 1970.

== Background ==
=== Postal Reorganization Act of 1970 ===
In 1970, Richard Nixon signed the Postal Reorganization Act of 1970 into law. This law transformed the United States Post Office Department into the modern United States Postal Service. This was in response to a growing deficit in the post-war years and a nationwide strike by postal workers.

=== 2001 Postal Crisis ===
In 2001, an economic crisis was predicted for the Service that led Congressional leaders to hold hearings on what factors might cause a full blown crisis. These factors included falling revenue, falling mail volume due to competition, and increasing debt. When the crisis did hit, it was found that the lengthy rate setting process, higher personnel costs compared to competitors, and the increased usage of the internet all contributed to the crisis. The American Postal Workers Union (APWU) claimed that the $12 billion in annual discounts given to private mailers for pre-sorting mail was also to blame.

=== President's Commission on the United States Postal Service ===
In December of 2002, President Bush created the Commission on the United States Postal Service. It was this Commission's job to research the falling revenue of the Service and provide recommendations to the President about what actions could be taken to remedy the situation. In its final report, the Commission recommended that the Service should;

- remain a public entity to provide a public good rather than becoming a private corporation,
- better define the role of the Service and its monopoly by establishing a "Postal Regulatory Board,"
- focus on providing only services related to mail and shipping,
- use the Postal Regulatory Board to overhaul the rate setting process in order to increase efficiency,
- and update its aging infrastructure to increase revenue and efficiency.

=== Postal Civil Service Retirement System Funding Reform Act of 2003 ===
In 2003, Congress passed the Postal Civil Service Retirement System Funding Reform Act of 2003 as a stopgap measure to increase revenue in the Service. While it provided some relief, it also created an escrow account from which the Service had to pay in to yet could not withdraw from. It also made the Service liable for certain benefits granted to military and veteran employees, which was usually paid for by the United States Treasury and which no other government organization had to independently pay for.

== Legislative history ==
The bill was introduced in the United States House of Representatives by Tom Davis, a Republican from Virginia, and cosponsored by Republican John M. McHugh of New York and Democrats Henry Waxman of California and Danny K. Davis of Illinois. As the chair of the Senate Oversight committee, Senator Susan Collins of Maine shepherded the bill's passage through the Senate. The bill was approved during the lame duck session of the 109th Congress, and approved via voice vote in the House and by unanimous consent in the Senate.

According to Tom Davis, the Bush administration threatened to veto the legislation unless they added the provision regarding funding the employee benefits in advance with the objective of using that money to reduce the federal deficit. When he signed the bill on December 20, 2006, Bush issued a signing statement that says that the government can open mail under emergency conditions, though Waxman asserted that the government cannot do this without a search warrant.

== Provisions ==
=== Postal Regulatory Commission ===
Title VI replaced the Postal Rate Commission with the Postal Regulatory Commission (PRC). The PRC was granted a greater scope of responsibilities and the power to issue subpoenas.

=== Postal Service Retiree Health Benefits Fund ===
Title VIII established the Postal Service Retiree Health Benefits Fund (PSRHBF) and established a payment schedule that determined how much the Service owed at the end of each fiscal year. For the first ten years after the bill was passed, the scheduled payments ranged between $5.4 billion to $5.8 billion. On June 30 of each year starting in 2017, the Service was required to update the amounts owed based on any liability for or surplus of the Fund until 2056 or within 15 years, whichever comes later.

Section 802 returned certain obligations relating to veteran benefits back to the United States Treasury.

Section 803 released the funds held in the escrow account to be used for the PSRHBF.

=== Rate setting ===
Title II overhauled the process in which the USPS needed to change the rate of products, limiting any increase to the consumer price index. The process that the USPS needed to go through to change rates was also significantly more efficient than the older rate setting system, going from a six month or more process to a two month process.

=== Minor provisions ===
- Section 101 provided a legal definition for "postal service."
- Section 102 limited the ability of the Service to provide "non-postal services."
- Title III provided service standards for the Service to achieve.
- Section 403 prohibited unfair competition on the part of the Service.
- Title VII required reports and studies to be done on the implementation of the PAEA.

== Impact on the Service ==
Between 2007 and 2016, the USPS lost $62.4 billion; the inspector general of the USPS estimated that $54.8 billion of that (87%) was due to prefunding retiree benefits. By the end of 2019, the USPS had $160.9 billion in debt, due to growth of the Internet, the Great Recession, and prepaying for employee benefits as stipulated in PAEA. Mail volume decreased from 97 billion to 68 billion items from 2006 to 2012. The employee benefits cost the USPS about $5.5 billion per year; USPS began defaulting on this payment in 2012. The COVID-19 pandemic further reduced income due to decreased demand in 2020.

Columnist Dan Casey wrote in a July 2014 op-ed in The Roanoke Times that the PAEA is "one of the most insane laws Congress ever enacted". Bill Pascrell, a Democratic House member from New Jersey, said in 2019 that it was rushed through Congress without due consideration, and referred to it as "one of the worst pieces of legislation Congress has passed in a generation". In May 2020, a segment on Last Week Tonight with John Oliver examined the law and its impact on the USPS, demonstrating that it has contributed to its debt. It has been alleged that this legislation contributed to the 2020 United States Postal Service crisis.

The Act was also found to have caused the price of certain products like Money Orders to increase multiple times, becoming increasingly non-competitive, in turn contributing to its reduced volume and non-profitability in the space.

The USPS Fairness Act, introduced in 2021 with bipartisan support by Peter DeFazio in the U.S. House and by Steve Daines and Brian Schatz in the U.S. Senate, would undo substantial parts of the PAEA. It eventually passed the Senate as part of the Postal Service Reform Act of 2022.
