= Multiline optical-character reader =

Type of mail sorting machine

A multiline optical-character reader, or MLOCR, is a type of mail sorting machine that uses optical character recognition (OCR) technology to determine how to route mail through the postal system.

MLOCRs work by capturing images of the front of letter-sized mailpieces, and extracting the entire address from each piece. It looks up the postal code within each address in a master database, prints a barcode representing this information on the mailpiece, and performs an initial sort. All of this occurs in a fraction of a second as the mailpiece passes through the machine. After this point, mail is further sorted by barcode sorters that read this barcode to determine its destination throughout its journey all the way down to the walk sequence of the mail carrier.

The United States Postal Service has used remote bar coding since 1992. In the United States, if the MLOCR is not able to decode the address, then the mailpiece is placed on "hold" by printing a unique fluorescent barcode on the back of the mailpiece, and the mailpiece is then set aside for further processing by the Remote Bar Coding System (formerly called Remote Video Encoding). An image of the mailpiece is sent to a Remote Encoding Center where a human data conversion operator manually inspects the image. The operator converts the information on the mailpiece into abbreviated codes and enters the data into the computer. This data is sent back to the MLOCR site where it is matched with the unique barcode on the back of the un-coded mailpiece, and a barcode is then printed on the mailpiece like the rest of the mail. All this effort is invested up front into deciphering the destination of each mailpiece and printing the correct barcode, so that the mailpiece will never need to be manually examined again until it reaches the hands of the letter carrier who will carry it to the final delivery point. A Delivery Bar Code Sorter is repeatedly used at each point in the USPS system to read the barcode and sort the mailpiece to a tray corresponding to the next leg of its journey towards its final destination.

The United States Postal Service is the largest user of these machines; however, large volume mailers and mail consolidators also have their own MLOCR systems to barcode outgoing mail in order to receive significant postage discounts.

An option called FASTforward can be added to an MLOCR that allows it to automatically forward mail to a new address. This additional computer hardware/software combination looks up decoded addresses in the National Change of Address database to see if the recipient has recently moved. If so, a POSTNET barcode representing the new address is sprayed on the mailpiece thus routing it to new address although the old address is still visible—a testament to the degree at which mail can be mechanically sorted.

Generally, all OCR-equipped letter sorting machines ordered since the late 1980s have been equipped with OCR systems capable of reading multiple lines of address.
