= United States Postal Service =

Independent agency of the U.S. federal government

- Government signature used since 1993

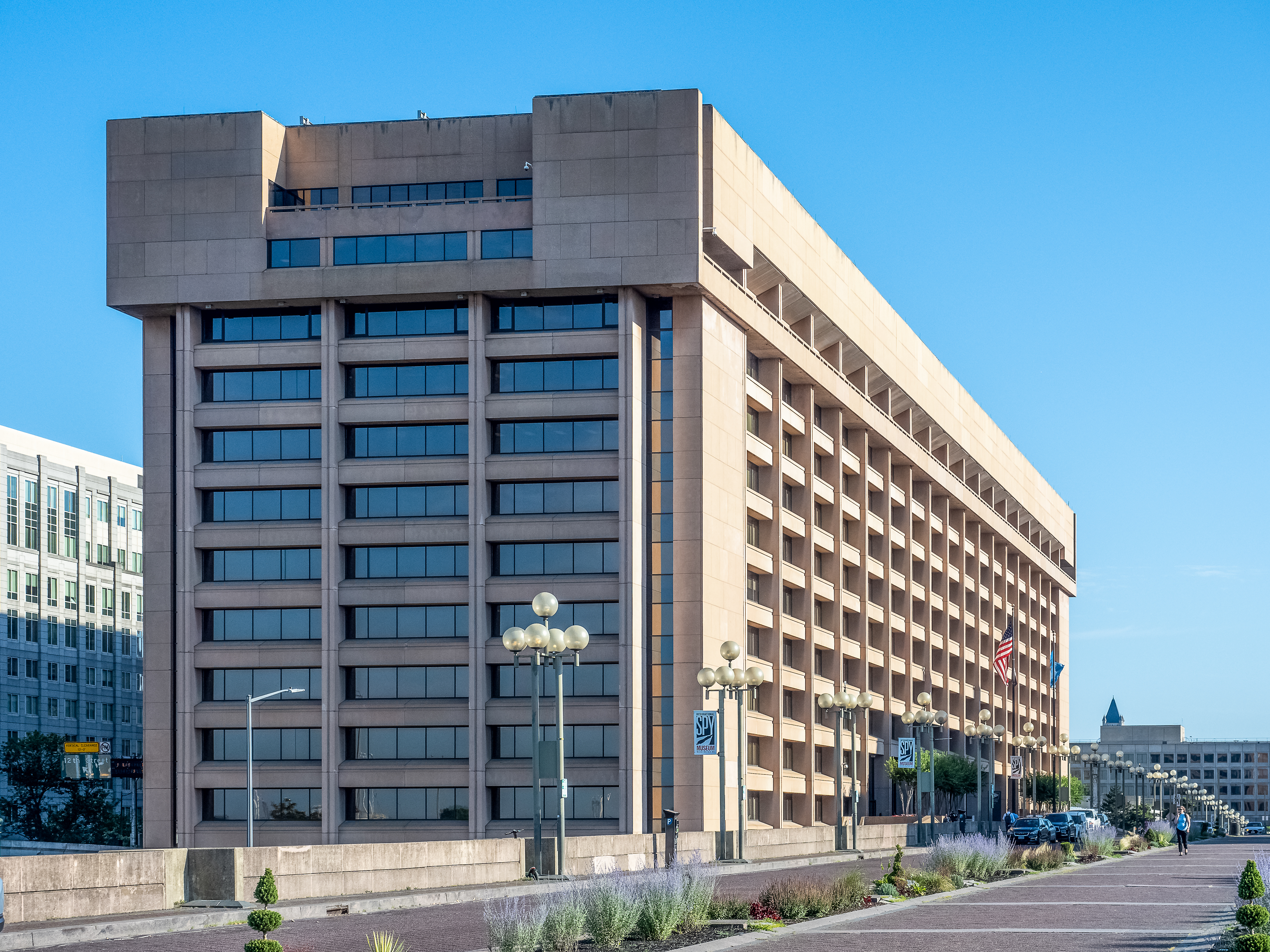
- USPS Headquarters in Washington, D.C. (2024)

Agency overview
- Formed: July 1, 1971; 55 years ago Washington, D.C., U.S.
- Preceding agency: United States Post Office Department
- Jurisdiction: U.S. federal government
- Headquarters: 475 L'Enfant Plaza SW Washington, D.C. 20260-0004 U.S.
- Employees: 640,000 (525,377 career personnel, 114,623 pre-career personnel) as of 2024
- Agency executive: David Steiner, Postmaster General
- Key document: Postal Clause of the United States Constitution
- Website: usps.com

Footnotes
- Revenue (2026): ▲$82.9 billion
- Net income (2026): ▼ −$6.5 billion

The full eagle logo, used in various versions from 1970 to 1993

The United States Postal Service (USPS; also known as the Post Office, U.S. Mail, or simply the Postal Service) is an independent agency of the executive branch of the United States federal government responsible for providing postal service in the United States, its insular areas and associated states. It is one of a few government agencies explicitly authorized by the Constitution of the United States. The USPS began operations in 1971, replacing the United States Post Office Department, a Cabinet department. As of March 29, 2024, the USPS has 525,377 career employees and 114,623 pre-career employees.

The USPS has a monopoly on traditional letter delivery within the United States and operates under a universal service obligation (USO), both of which are defined across a broad set of legal mandates, which obligate it to provide uniform price and quality across the entirety of its service area. The Post Office has exclusive access to letter boxes marked "U.S. Mail" and personal letterboxes in the U.S., but has to compete against private package delivery services, such as United Parcel Service, FedEx, and DHL.

== History ==
The first national postal agency in the US, known as the United States Post Office was founded by the Second Continental Congress in Philadelphia on July 26, 1775, at the beginning of the American Revolution. Benjamin Franklin was appointed the first postmaster general; he also served a similar position for the American colonies. The Postal Clause was then included in the United States Constitution when it was ratified in 1788, authorizing the U.S. Congress to "establish post offices and post roads"; the original intent of the clause was to facilitate interstate communication as well as to create a source of revenue for the early United States. The Post Office Department was then created in 1792 with the passage of the Postal Service Act. It was elevated to a cabinet-level department in 1872, and was transformed by the Postal Reorganization Act of 1970 into the U.S. Postal Service as an independent agency.

In 1844, entrepreneur and legal theorist Lysander Spooner challenged the Post Office's monopoly by founding the American Letter Mail Company, which offered lower rates and faster service between major cities. Although popular with customers, his enterprise was ultimately shut down by federal legal pressure, prompting Congress to reinforce the postal monopoly in 1851.

The Post Office Department owned and operated the first public telegraph lines in the United States, starting in 1844 from Washington to Baltimore, and eventually extending to New York, Boston, Buffalo, and Philadelphia. In 1847, the telegraph system was privatized, except for a period during World War I, when it was used to accelerate the delivery of letters arriving at night.

Between 1942 and 1945, "V-Mail" (for "Victory Mail") service was available for military mail. Letters were converted into microfilm and reprinted near the destination, to save room on transport vehicles for military cargo.

The United States Information Agency (USIA) helped the Post Office Department, during the Cold War, to redesign stamps to include more patriotic slogans. On March 18, 1970, postal workers in New York City—upset over low wages and poor working conditions, and emboldened by the Civil Rights Movement—organized a strike. The strike initially involved postal workers in only New York City, but it eventually gained support of over 210,000 postal workers across the nation. While the strike ended without any concessions from the federal government, it did ultimately allow for postal worker unions and the government to negotiate a contract which gave the unions most of what they wanted, as well as the signing of the Postal Reorganization Act by President Richard Nixon on August 12, 1970. The act replaced the cabinet-level Post Office Department with a new federal agency, the U.S. Postal Service, and came into effect on July 1, 1971.

Among the changes from the Postal Reorganization Act, a key aspect was the requirement for the USPS to be self-financing, which introduced a conflict with its other requirement to provide a nationwide service. The next major legislation affecting the service, the Postal Accountability and Enhancement Act, was passed in 2006. This act limited the services that the Postal Service could offer to only those it already provided and also established a requirement for the USPS to save money for the medical benefits of future retirees. The Act set a goal to save $5 billion per year for the first 10 years of a 50-year schedule, however within 6 years the Postal Service began to default on its payments.

=== Declining mail volume ===
First-class mail volume peaked in 2001 at 103.65 billion, declining to 52.62 billion by 2020 due to the increasing use of email and the World Wide Web for correspondence and business transactions. The Postal Service experienced lower revenues as mail use declined in the 2010s. Private courier services, such as FedEx and United Parcel Service (UPS), directly compete with USPS for the delivery of packages.

=== Internal streamlining and delivery slowdown ===
In response, the USPS has increased productivity each year from 2000 to 2007, through increased automation, route re-optimization, and facility consolidation. Despite these efforts, the organization saw an $8.5 billion budget shortfall in 2010, and was losing money at a rate of about $3 billion per quarter in 2011.

=== Elimination of Saturday delivery averted ===
On January 28, 2009, Postmaster General John E. Potter testified before the Senate that, if the Postal Service could not readjust its payment toward the contractually funding earned employee retiree health benefits, as mandated by the Postal Accountability & Enhancement Act of 2006, the USPS would be forced to consider cutting delivery to five days per week during June, July, and August. H.R. 22, addressing this issue, passed the House of Representatives and Senate and was signed into law on September 30, 2009. However, Postmaster General Potter continued to advance plans to eliminate Saturday mail delivery.

In February 2013, the USPS announced that in order to save about $2 billion per year, Saturday delivery service would be discontinued except for packages, mail-order medicines, Priority Mail, Express Mail, and mail delivered to Post Office boxes, beginning August 10, 2013. However, the Consolidated and Further Continuing Appropriations Act, 2013, passed in March, reversed the cuts to Saturday delivery.

=== Post office closures ===
On December 5, 2011, the USPS announced it would close more than half of its mail processing centers, eliminate 28,000 jobs and reduce overnight delivery of First-Class Mail. At peak mail volume in 2006, the USPS operated 673 facilities. New delivery standards were issued in January 2015 in which the majority of single-piece (not presorted) first-class mail started being delivered in two days instead of one. Large commercial mailers can still have first-class mail delivered overnight if delivered directly to a processing center in the early morning. In 2014, this represented only 11% of first-class mail. In May 2012, the service announced it had modified its plan. Instead, rural post offices would remain open with reduced retail hours (some as little as two hours per day) unless there was a community preference for a different option.

=== Delivering for America reform plan ===
In March 2021, the Postal Service launched a 10-year reform plan called Delivering for America, intended to improve the agency's financial stability, service reliability, and operational efficiency. The plan includes $40 billion in investments meant to improve USPS technology and facilities. In April 2022, the Postal Service Reform Act of 2022 was signed into law. It lifted financial burdens placed on the USPS by the 2006 Postal Accountability and Enhancement Act.

=== Retirement funding and payment defaults ===
The Postal Accountability and Enhancement Act of 2006 (PAEA) obligated the USPS to fund the present value of earned retirement obligations (essentially past promises which have not yet come due) within a ten-year time span.

In 2012, in order to be able to meet obligations for payroll and continuing its operations, the Postal Service defaulted on payments due for retirements benefits in August and again in September that year. In September 2014, it defaulted on the payments for the fourth time, and continued to default into 2017. The Postal Service sought financial reforms from Congress for relief from the funding obligation and debt from the defaults. Legislation was introduced in Congress in 2016 as well as in 2019, aiming to remove the benefits funding obligations, however no new legislation was passed until the 2022 Postal Service Reform Act (PSRA). The PSRA was signed into law in April 2022. It forgave $57 billion in Postal Service debt and released it from the obligation to set aside funds for future retirees' healthcare, as well as adding requirements for delivery timing and reporting on performance metrics, and allowing the Postal Service to offer some non-mail services.

The U.S. Office of Personnel Management (OPM) is the main bureaucratic organization responsible for the human resources aspect of many federal agencies and their employees. The PAEA created the Postal Service Retiree Health Benefit Fund (PSRHB) after Congress removed the Postal Service contribution to the Civil Service Retirement System (CSRS). Most other employees that contribute to the CSRS have 7% deducted from their wages. Currently, all new employees contribute into Federal Employee Retirement System (FERS) once they become a full-time regular employees.

On September 30, 2014, the USPS failed to make a $5.7 billion payment on this debt, the fourth such default. In 2017, the USPS defaulted on some of the last lump-sum payments required by the 2006 law, though other payments were also still required.

Proposals to cancel the funding obligation and plan a new schedule for the debt were introduced in Congress as early as 2016. A 2019 bill entitled the "USPS Fairness Act", which would have eliminated the pension funding obligation, passed the House but did not proceed further. As of March 8, 2022, the Postal Service Reform Act of 2022, which includes a section entitled "USPS Fairness Act" cancelling the obligation, has passed both the House and the Senate; President Joe Biden signed the bill into law on April 6, 2022.

=== COVID-19 test kits to Americans ===
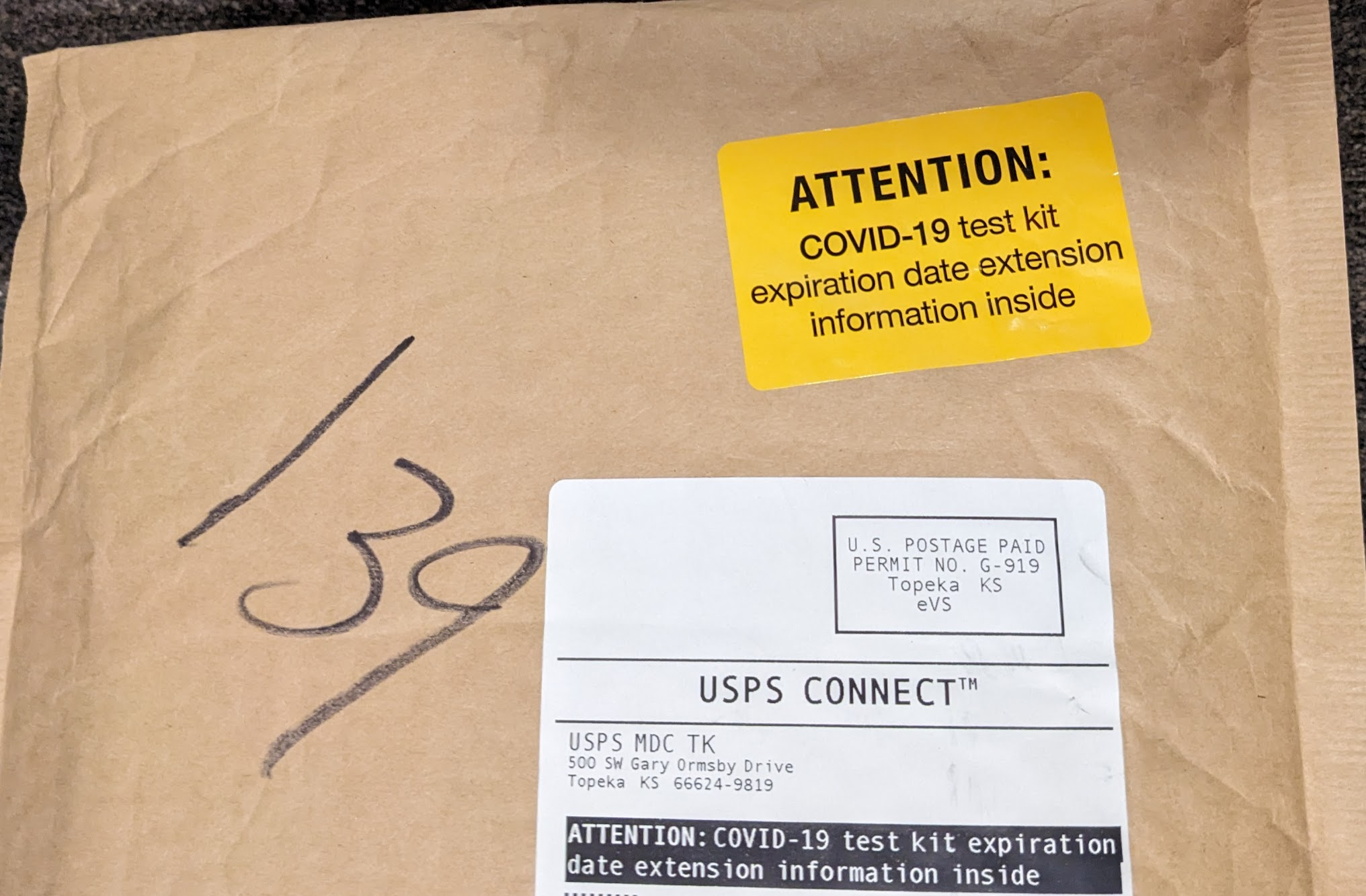
COVID-19 test kits distributed by the USPS, photographed in 2023

Postmaster General DeJoy helped the USPS deliver approximately 380 million home test kits from January 2022 through May 2022. As of March 2024, when the program concluded, the USPS had delivered over 1.8 billion free COVID-19 test kits. In September 2024, the distribution of free at-home COVID-19 tests was re-started.

== Operations ==
=== Deliveries ===
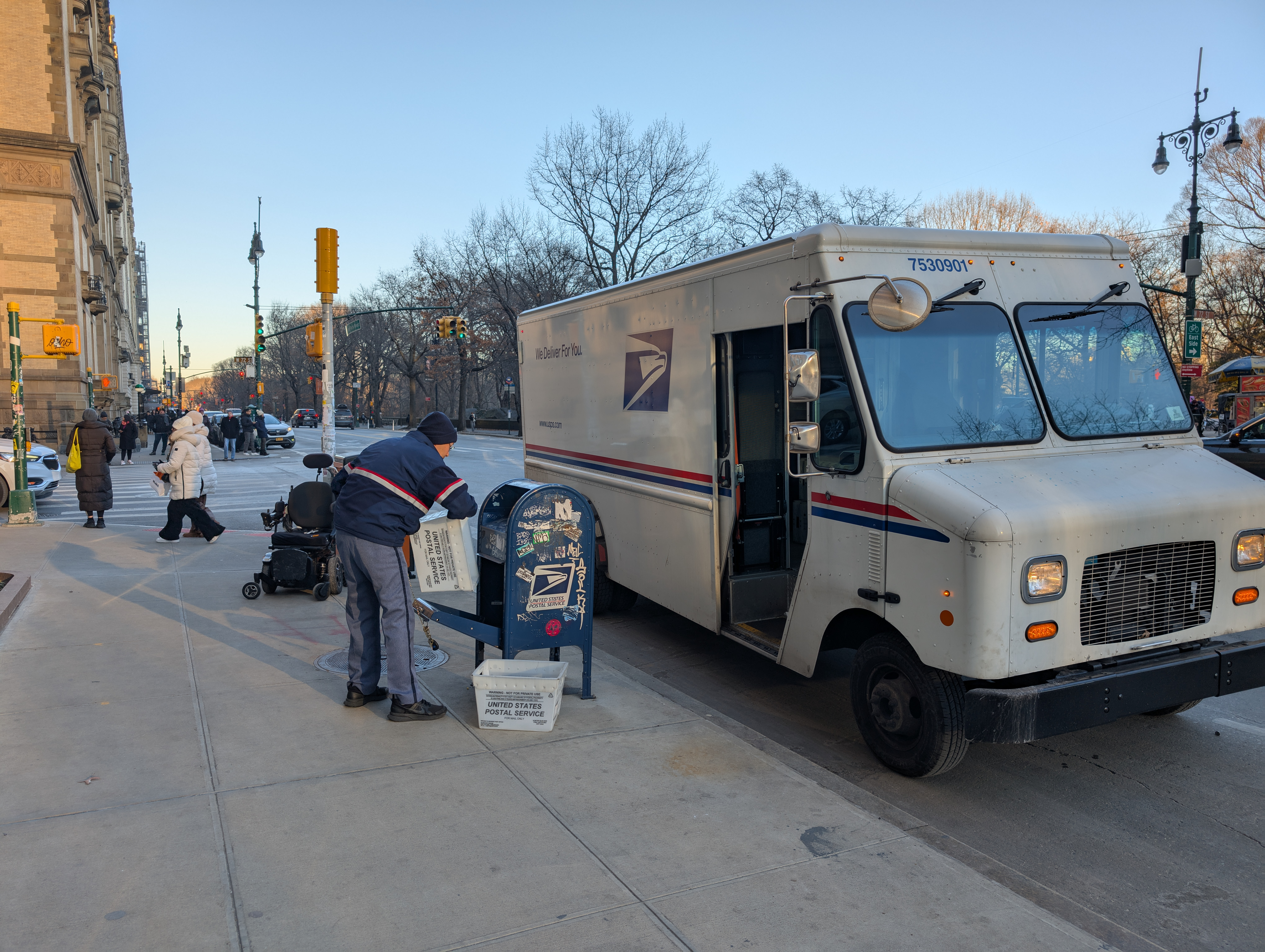
A letter carrier empties a mailbox in New York City

In the 2025 fiscal year, the Postal Service operated 30,972 retail offices in the U.S., and delivered a total of 108.7 billion packages and pieces of mail to 170.4 million delivery points in fiscal year 2025.

USPS delivers mail and packages Monday through Saturday as required by the Postal Service Reform Act of 2022; on Sundays only Priority Express and packages for Amazon.com are delivered. The USPS delivers packages on Sundays in most major cities. During the four weeks preceding Christmas since 2013, packages from all mail classes and senders were delivered on Sunday in some areas. Parcels are also delivered on holidays, with the exception of Thanksgiving and Christmas. The USPS started delivering Priority Mail Express packages on Christmas Day in select locations for an additional fee.

The holiday season between Thanksgiving and Christmas is the peak period for the Postal Service, representing a total volume of 11.7 billion packages and pieces of mail during this time in 2022. As part of Delivering for America, the Postal Service has introduced three new parcel shipping offerings: USPS Connect in June 2022, USPS Ground Advantage in July 2023, and Priority Next Day in March 2025. It has also installed 348 new package sorting machines within its facilities. As of September 2023, the Postal Service is able to process approximately 70 million packages per day, up from 53 million in 2021, and 60 million in 2022. The USPS announced in July 2022 that it would be building 60 new regional processing and distribution centers in order to replace smaller, redundant facilities. One of the first of these facilities, a 700,000-square-foot building in Gastonia, North Carolina, opened in November 2023. In an effort to stabilize its workforce, the Postal Service converted 150,000 of its pre-career workers into full-time employees between October 2020 and September 2023. Delivering for America has attempted to stabilize the Postal Service's finances by adjusting service times for mail and package delivery.

=== Fleet ===
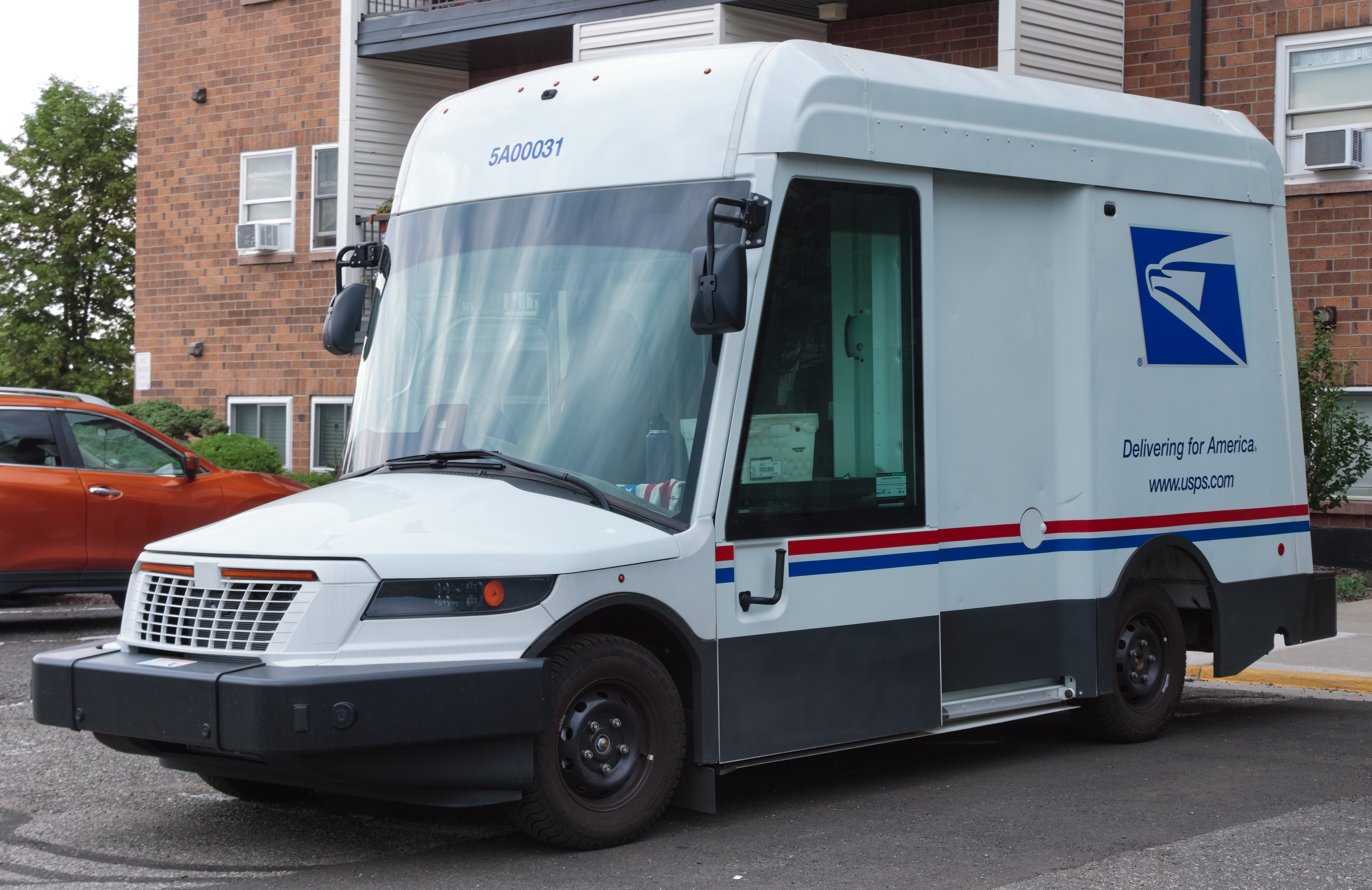
A Next Generation Delivery Vehicle (NGDV) in Golden, Colorado. The USPS plans to purchase over 165,000 NGDVs.

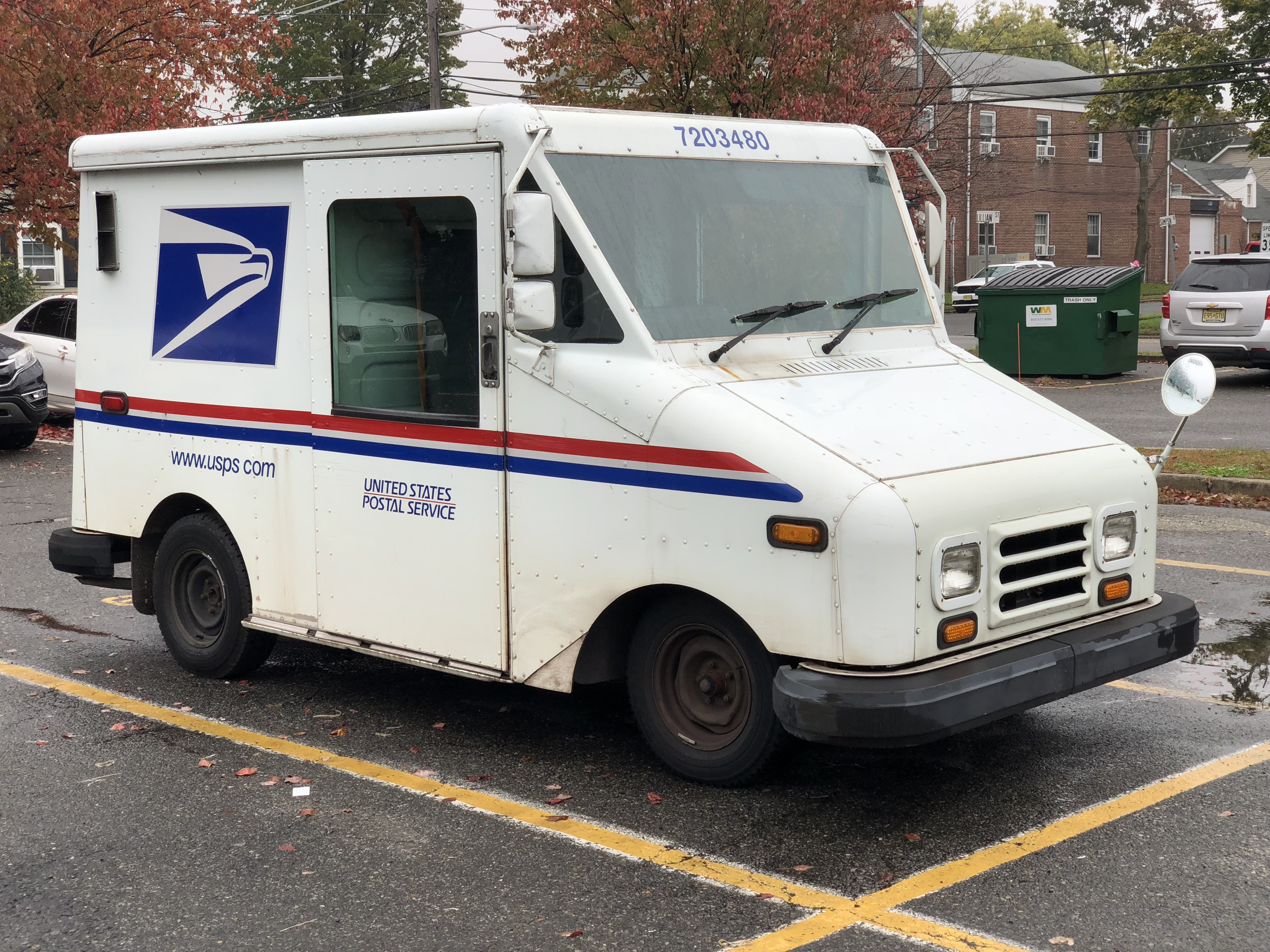
A Grumman LLV in Edison, New Jersey. LLVs were manufactured from 1987 to 1994, and many remain in service.

The USPS operates one of the largest civilian vehicle fleets in the world, with over 235,000 vehicles as of 2024, the majority of which are the distinctive and unique Chevrolet/Grumman LLV (long-life vehicle), and the similar, newer Ford-Utilimaster FFV (flexible-fuel vehicle), originally also referred to as the CRV (carrier route vehicle). The LLVs were built from 1987 to 1994 and lack air conditioning, airbags, anti-lock brakes, and space for the large modern volume of e-commerce packages, the Grumman fleet ended its expected 24-year lifespan in fiscal year 2017. The LLV replacement process began in 2015, and after numerous delays, a $6 billion contract was awarded in February 2021 to Oshkosh Defense to finalize design and produce 165,000 vehicles over 10 years. The Next Generation Delivery Vehicle (NGDV) will have both gasoline and battery electric versions. Half of the initial 50,000 vehicles will be electric, as will all vehicles purchased after 2026.

The number of gallons of fuel used in 2009 was 444 million, at a cost of US$1.1 billion. For every penny increase in the national average price of gasoline, the USPS spends an extra US$8 million per year to fuel its fleet.

The fleet is notable in that many of its vehicles are right-hand drive, an arrangement intended to give drivers the easiest access to roadside mailboxes. Some rural letter carriers use personal vehicles. All contractors use personal vehicles. Standard postal-owned vehicles do not have license plates. These vehicles are identified by a seven-digit number displayed on the front and rear.

==== Electrifying the USPS fleet ====
Starting in 2026, all delivery truck purchases are scheduled to be electric vehicles, partly in response to criticism from the Environmental Protection Agency and an environmental lawsuit, and also due to availability of new funding provided by the Inflation Reduction Act of 2022. The Act included $3 billion for electric USPS vehicles, supporting the initiative by Postmaster General DeJoy and the Biden Administration to add 66,000 electric vehicles to the fleet by 2028. The electric fleet will be composed of 9,250 EVs manufactured by Ford; 11,750 commercial off-the-shelf EVs; and 45,000 Oshkosh Next Generation Delivery Vehicles. In February 2023, the Postal Service announced its purchase of the Ford EVs as well as 14,000 electric vehicle charging stations. The fleet electrification plan is part of the Postal Service's initiative to reduce carbon emissions from fuel and electricity 40 percent and emissions from contracted services 20 percent by 2030. The bulk of the savings comes from less expensive 'fuel' and less required maintenance. Other benefits include less pollution where children live and play.

In August 2024, the USPS deployed the first new vehicles from its fleet modernization project at its Topeka Sorting and Delivery Center in Kansas, including: an electric vehicle with higher clearance for routes delivering a high number of packages, and an electric delivery vehicle produced in partnership with Canoo that is a "pod-like" smaller van.

== Budget ==
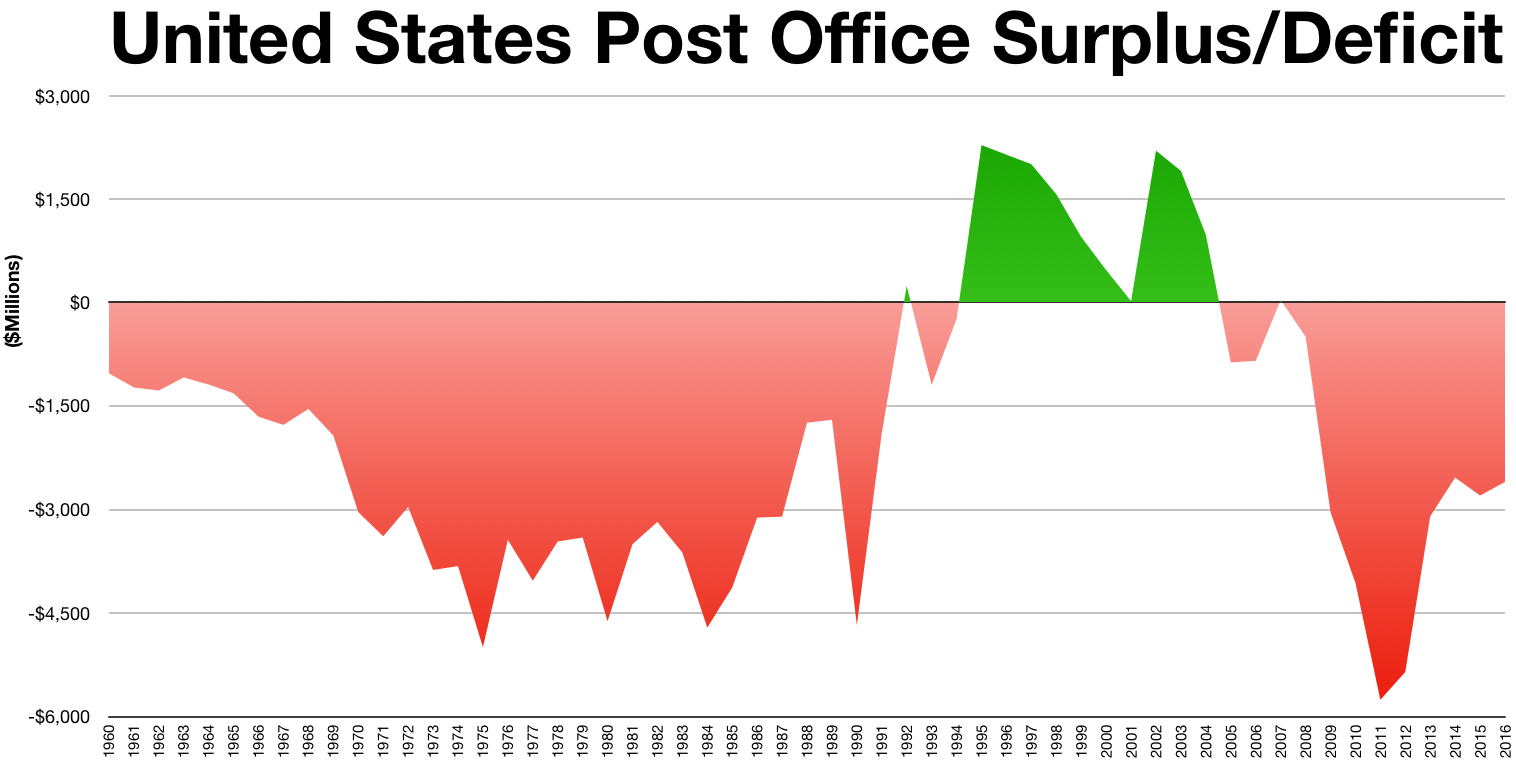
United States Postal Service surplus/deficit

In fiscal year 2022, the Postal Service had $78.81 billion in revenue and expenses of $79.74 billion. Due to one-time appropriations authorized by the Postal Service Reform Act of 2022, the agency reported a net income of $56.04 billion. In the 2023 fiscal year, revenue had increased to $79.32 billion, but reported a net loss of $6.48 billion. In the 2024 fiscal year, revenue increased to $79.53 billion but reported a net loss of $9.5 billion.

=== Rate increases ===
Congress has limited rate increases for First-Class Mail to the cost of inflation, unless approved by the Postal Regulatory Commission. A 3¢ surcharge above inflation increased the 1 oz (28 g) rate to 49¢ in January 2014, but this was approved by the commission for two years only. The U.S. Postal Service filed notice with the Postal Regulatory Commission (PRC) of mailing services price changes to take effect on July 12, 2026, including a 4¢ increase in the price of a First-Class Mail Forever stamp from 78¢ to 82¢.

In 2020, the Postal Regulatory Commission gave the Postal Service increased authority to raise postage rates in order to cover its operating costs. Between 2021 and 2023, USPS has raised the postage rate four times. In May 2023, USPS reported a $2.5 billion loss over the year's first quarter, with approximately $500 million of that figure related to costs within the agency's control. It also reported that its projected ten-year losses had been reduced from $160 billion to $70 billion.

In February 2025, the Postal Service announced new service standards for first-class mail, periodicals, marketing mail, and package services. These new standards, which include allowing postal workers to travel a greater distance for deliveries and replacing three-digit regional ZIP code add-ons with five-digit ones, are intended to improve delivery network reliability and save the agency approximately $36 billion between 2025 and 2035.

=== Loans ===
In April 2020, Congress approved a $10 billion loan from the Treasury to the post office. According to The Washington Post, officials under Treasury Secretary Steven Mnuchin suggested using the loan as leverage to give the Treasury Department more influence on USPS operations, including making them raise their charges for package deliveries, a change long sought by President Trump.

=== DeJoy reform ===
In May 2020, the Board of Governors of the United States Postal Service appointed Louis DeJoy as Postmaster General. DeJoy was the first appointee in two decades to come from outside the postal service. Prior to the appointment, he was the founder and CEO of the logistics and freight company New Breed Logistics and was a major Republican Party donor and fundraiser for Donald Trump.

DeJoy immediately began taking measures to reduce costs, such as banning overtime and extra trips to deliver mail. While DeJoy admitted that these measures were causing delays in mail delivery, he said they would eventually improve service.

== Elections influence ==
In the summer of 2020, a presidential election year, more than 600 high-speed mail sorting machines were scheduled to be dismantled and removed from postal facilities, raising concerns that mailed ballots for the November 3 election might not reach election offices on time. Mail collection boxes were removed from the streets in many cities; after photos of boxes being removed were spread on social media, a postal service spokesman said they were being moved to higher traffic areas but that the removals would stop until after the election. On August 18, 2020, after days of heavy criticism and the day after lawsuits against the Postal Service and DeJoy personally were filed in federal court by several individuals, DeJoy announced that he would roll back all the changes until after the November election. He said he would reinstate overtime hours and roll back service reductions. However, 95% of the mail sorting machines that were planned for removal had already been removed. On December 27, 2020, the Consolidated Appropriations Act of 2021 forgave the previous $10 billion loan.

=== Coronavirus pandemic and voting by mail ===
The percentage of American voters who vote by mail or absentee ballots more than tripled since 1996, spiking in 2020 during the COVID pandemic.

Voting by mail has become an increasingly common practice in the United States, with 25% of voters nationwide mailing their ballots in 2016 and 2018. The coronavirus pandemic of 2020 was predicted to cause a large increase in mail voting because of the possible danger of congregating at polling places. For the 2020 election, a state-by-state analysis concluded that 76% of Americans were eligible to vote by mail in 2020, a record number. The analysis predicted that 80 million ballots could be cast by mail in 2020 – more than double the number in 2016. The Postal Service sent letters to 46 states in July 2020, warning that the service might not be able to meet each state's deadlines for requesting and casting last-minute absentee ballots. The House of Representatives voted to include an emergency grant of $25 billion to the post office to facilitate the predicted flood of mail ballots, but the bill never reached the Senate floor for a vote.

A March 2021 report from the Postal Service's inspector general found that the vast majority of mail-in ballots and registration materials in the 2020 election were delivered to the relevant authorities on time. The Postal Service handled approximately 135 million pieces of election-related mail between September 1 and November 3, delivering 97.9% of ballots from voters to election officials within three days, and 99.89% of ballots within seven days.

=== 2026 election procedures ===
Trump signed an executive order in March that gave the USPS an unprecedented role in screening states’ mail ballot programs. Election officials have already expressed deep concerns about having to use a system that has not gone through extensive testing and training procedures

A whistleblower reported that the new requirements were unclear, but USPS leadership assured that what needed to be done was clear. The plan is to require election officials to upload voter registration to the USPS with the barcode associated with each mail in ballot. The USPS has stated it will not deliver the entire batch of ballots in which are there are any unregistered ballots.

== Handling of live animal shipments ==
The Postal Service has faced criticism over its handling of live animal shipments. Media reports have documented delays in the delivery of animals, as well as instances in which animals arrived dead or in poor condition. In 2025, approximately 12,000 chicks were left unattended in a USPS truck at a Delaware distribution center for several days, resulting in the deaths of thousands of birds.

== Governance and organization ==
The Board of Governors of the United States Postal Service sets policy, procedure, and postal rates for services rendered. It has a similar role to a corporate board of directors. Of the eleven members of the Board, nine are appointed by the president and confirmed by the U.S. Senate (see 39 U.S.C. § 202). The nine appointed members then select the United States postmaster general, who serves as the board's tenth member, and who oversees the day-to-day activities of the service as chief executive officer (see 39 U.S.C. §§ 202–203). The ten-member board then nominates a deputy postmaster general, who acts as chief operating officer, to the eleventh and last remaining open seat.

The independent Postal Regulatory Commission (formerly the Postal Rate Commission) is also controlled by appointees of the president confirmed by the Senate. It oversees postal rates and related concerns, having the authority to approve or reject USPS proposals.

The USPS is often mistaken for a state-owned enterprise or government-owned corporation (e.g., Amtrak) because it operates much like a business. It is, however, an "establishment of the executive branch of the Government of the United States", (39 U.S.C. § 201) as it is controlled by presidential appointees and the postmaster general. As a government agency, it has many special privileges, including sovereign immunity, eminent domain powers, powers to negotiate postal treaties with foreign nations, and an exclusive legal right to deliver first-class and third-class mail. Indeed, in 2004, the U.S. Supreme Court ruled in a unanimous decision "The Postal Service is not subject to antitrust liability. In both form and function, it is not a separate antitrust person from the United States but is part of the Government, and so is not controlled by the antitrust laws" such as the Sherman Antitrust Act of 1890. Unlike a state-owned enterprise, the USPS lacks a transparent ownership structure and is not subject to standard rules and norms that apply to commercial entities. The USPS also lacks commercial discretion and control.

18 U.S.C. § 1725 creates a statutory monopoly on access to letter boxes by authorizing the federal government to impose fines against anyone who "knowingly and willfully deposits any mailable matter" in such letter boxes "on which no postage has been paid". The U.S. Supreme Court has upheld this monopoly against a First Amendment freedom of speech challenge; it thus remains illegal in the U.S. for anyone, other than the employees and agents of the USPS, to deliver mail pieces to letter boxes marked "U.S. Mail".

The Postal Service also has a Mailers' Technical Advisory Committee and local Postal Customer Councils, which are advisory and primarily involve business customers. The USPS assigns city names to various postal addresses; these assignments do not always correspond with municipal boundaries. Mailing address names may stay the same even if city boundaries change.

=== Funding and privatization proposals ===
Since the Postal Reorganization Act came into effect in 1971, the USPS has been mandated to be self-financing and rely solely on revenue from stamps and package deliveries to support itself. In 1982, postal stamps were changed to be categorized as products rather than a form of taxation, and since then, the Postal Service has no longer received taxpayer funding.

Since the 1990s, Republicans have been discussing the idea of privatizing the U.S. Postal Service. In 2017, President Trump criticized the postal service's relationship with Amazon. Amazon maintains that the Postal Service makes a profit from their contract. Trump's administration proposed turning USPS into "a private postal operator" as part of a June 2018 governmental reorganization plan, although there was strong bipartisan opposition to the idea in Congress.

== Universal service obligation and monopoly status ==
=== Legal basis and rationale ===
Article I, section 8, Clause 7 of the U.S. Constitution grants Congress the power to establish post offices and post roads, which has been interpreted as a de facto Congressional monopoly over the delivery of first-class residential mail—which has been defined as non-urgent residential letters (not packages). Accordingly, no other system for delivering first-class residential mail—public or private—has been tolerated, absent Congress's consent. The mission of the Postal Service is to provide the American public with trusted universal postal service. While not explicitly defined, the Postal Service's universal service obligation (USO) is broadly outlined in statute and includes multiple dimensions: geographic scope, range of products, access to services and facilities, delivery frequency, affordable and uniform pricing, service quality, and security of the mail. While other carriers may claim to voluntarily provide delivery on a broad basis, the Postal Service is the only carrier with a legal obligation to provide all the various aspects of universal service.

Proponents of universal service principles claim that since any obligation must be matched by the financial capability to meet that obligation, the postal monopoly was put in place as a funding mechanism for the USO, and it has been in place for over a hundred years. It consists of two parts: the Private Express Statutes (PES) and the mailbox access rule. The PES refer to the Postal Service's monopoly on the delivery of letters, and the mailbox rule refers to the Postal Service's exclusive access to customer mailboxes.

Proponents of universal service principles further claim that eliminating or reducing the PES or mailbox rule would affect the ability of the Postal Service to provide affordable universal service. If, for example, the PES and the mailbox rule were to be eliminated, and the USO maintained, then either billions of dollars in tax revenues or some other source of funding would have to be found.

Some proponents of universal service principles suggest that private communications that are protected by the veil of government promote the exchange of free ideas and communications. This separates private communications from the ability of a private for-profit or non-profit organization to corrupt. Security for the individual is in this way protected by the United States Post Office, maintaining confidentiality and anonymity, as well as government employees being much less likely to be instructed by superiors to engage in nefarious spying. It is seen by some as a dangerous step to extract the universal service principle from the post office, as the untainted nature of private communications is preserved as assurance of the protection of individual freedom of privacy.

However, as the recent notice of a termination of mail service to residents of the Frank Church–River of No Return Wilderness indicates, mail service has been contracted to private firms such as Arnold Aviation for many decades. KTVB-TV reported:

=== 2008 report on universal postal service and the postal monopoly ===
The Postal Act of 2006 required the Postal Regulatory Commission (PRC) to submit a report to the president and Congress on universal postal service and the postal monopoly in December 2008. The report must include any recommended changes. The Postal Service report supports the requirement that the PRC is to consult with and solicit written comments from the Postal Service. In addition, the Government Accountability Office was required to evaluate broader business model issues by 2011.

On October 15, 2008, the Postal Service submitted a report to the PRC on its position related to the Universal Service Obligation (USO). It said no changes to the USO and restriction on mailbox access were necessary at that time, but increased regulatory flexibility was required to ensure affordable universal service in the future.

In February 2013, the Postal Service announced that starting August 2013, Saturday delivery would be discontinued. Congress traditionally includes a provision in an annual continuing resolution that requires six-day delivery; it did so again in March 2013, and the Postal Service was forced to continue Saturday delivery.

=== Monopoly and competition ===
Due to the postal monopoly, neither FedEx nor United Parcel Service (UPS) are allowed to deliver non-urgent letters, and may not directly ship to U.S. Mail boxes at residential and commercial destinations. However, both companies have transit agreements with the USPS in which an item can be dropped off with either FedEx or UPS who will then provide shipment up to the destination post office serving the intended recipient where it will be transferred for delivery to the U.S. Mail destination, including Post Office Box destinations. These services also deliver packages which are larger and heavier than USPS will accept.

Although USPS and UPS are direct competitors, USPS contracts with UPS for air transport of 2–3 Day Priority Mail and Priority Mail Express (typically delivered overnight).

== Law enforcement agencies ==
Under the Mail Cover Program USPS photographs the front and back of every piece of U.S. mail as part of the sorting process, enabling law enforcement to obtain address information and images of the outsides of mail as part of an investigation without the need for a warrant.

=== Postal Inspection Service ===
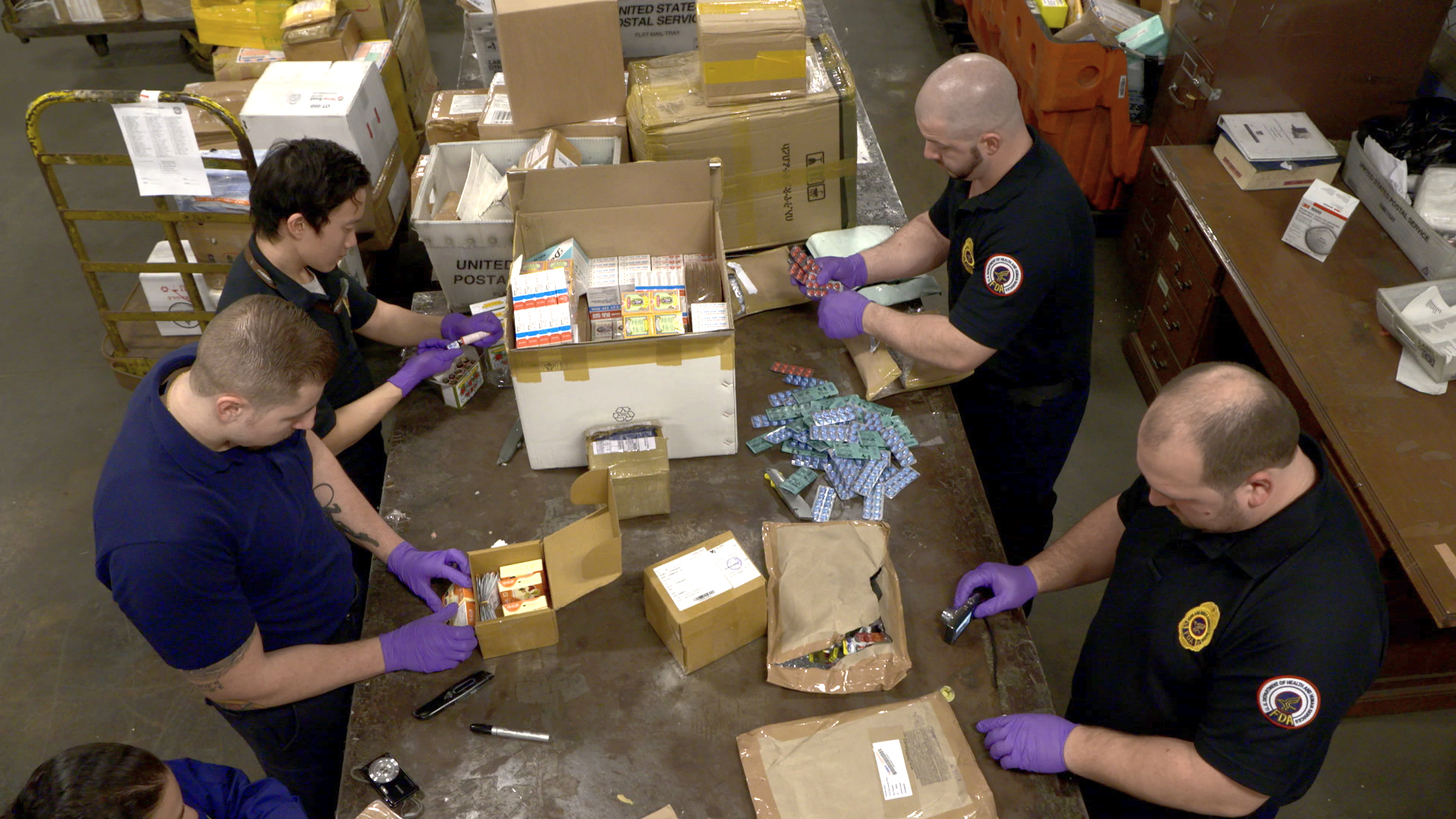
The Food and Drug Administration inspects packages for illegal drug shipments.

The United States Postal Inspection Service (USPIS) is one of the oldest law enforcement agencies in the U.S. Founded by Benjamin Franklin on August 7, 1775, its mission is to protect the Postal Service, its employees, and its customers from crime and protect the nation's mail system from criminal misuse. Postal Inspectors enforce over 200 federal laws providing for the protection of mail in investigations of crimes that may adversely affect or fraudulently use the U.S. Mail, the postal system or postal employees.

The USPIS has the power to enforce the USPS monopoly by conducting search and seizure raids on entities they suspect of sending non-urgent mail through overnight delivery competitors. According to the American Enterprise Institute, a private conservative think tank, the USPIS raided Equifax offices in 1993 to ascertain if the mail they were sending through FedEx was truly "extremely urgent". It was found that the mail was not, and Equifax was fined $30,000.

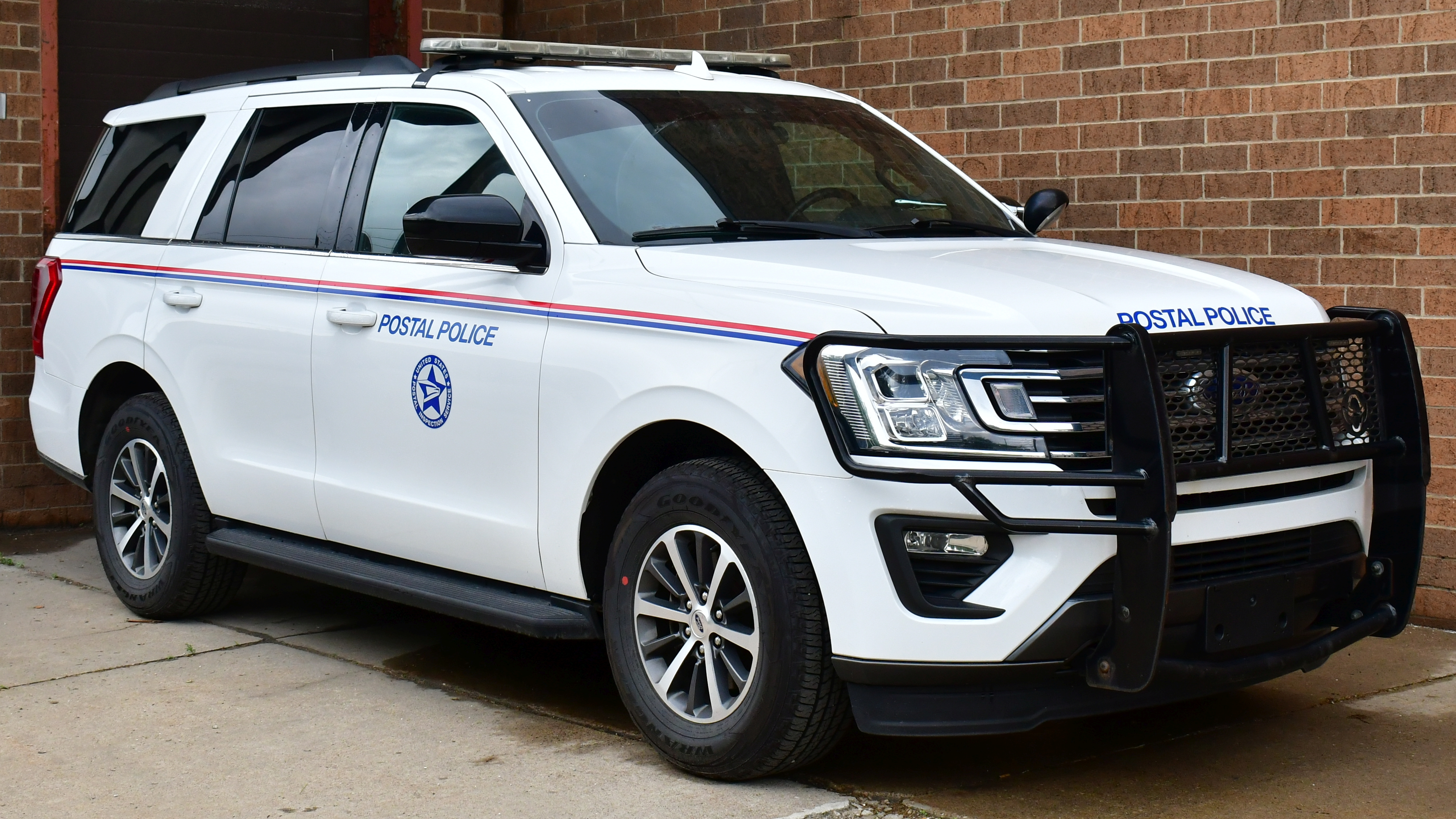
United States Postal Police car in Cleveland, Ohio

The PIS oversees the activities of the Postal Police Force who patrol and secure major postal facilities in the United States.

=== Office of Inspector General ===
The United States Postal Service Office of Inspector General (OIG) was authorized by law in 1996. Prior to the 1996 legislation, the Postal Inspection Service performed the duties of the OIG. The inspector general, who is independent of postal management, is appointed by and reports directly to the nine presidentially appointed, Senate–confirmed members of the Board of Governors of the United States Postal Service. The OIG's primary purpose is to prevent, detect and report fraud, waste and program abuse, and promote efficiency. The OIG has "oversight" responsibility for all activities of the Postal Inspection Service.

== How delivery services work ==
=== Elements of addressing and preparing domestic mail ===
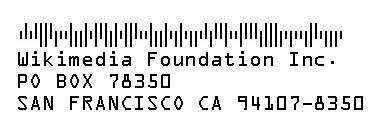
Example of an Intelligent Mail barcode

All mailable articles (e.g., letters, flats, machinable parcels, irregular parcels, etc.) shipped within the United States must comply with an array of standards published in the USPS Domestic Mail Manual (DMM). Before addressing the mailpiece, one must first comply with the various mailability standards relating to attributes of the actual mailpiece such as: minimum/maximum dimensions and weight, acceptable mailing containers, proper mailpiece sealing/closure, utilization of various markings, and restrictions relating to various hazardous (e.g., explosives, flammables, etc.) and restricted (e.g., cigarettes, smokeless tobacco, etc.) materials, as well as others articulated in § 601 of the DMM.

Undeliverable mail that cannot be readily returned, including mail without a return address, is treated as dead mail at the Mail Recovery Center in Atlanta, Georgia.

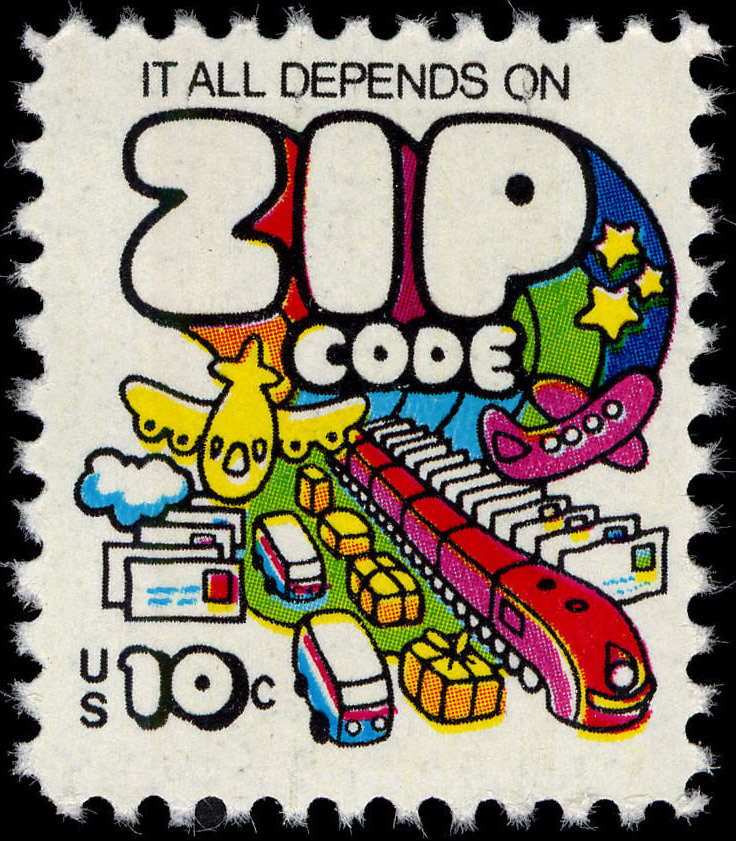
1973 stamp design promoting the then-new ZIP Code

The USPS maintains a list of proper abbreviations.

The format of a return address is similar. Though some style manuals recommend using a comma between the city and state name when typesetting addresses in other contexts, for optimal automatic character recognition, the Post Office does not recommend this when addressing mail. The official recommendation is to use all upper case block letters with proper formats and abbreviations, and leave out all punctuation except for the hyphen in the ZIP+4 code. If the address is unusually formatted or illegible enough, it will require hand-processing, delaying that particular item. The USPS publishes the entirety of their postal addressing standards.

Postal address verification tools and services are offered by the USPS and third-party companies to help ensure mail is deliverable by fixing formatting, appending information such as ZIP Code and validating the address is a valid delivery point. Customers can look up ZIP Codes and verify addresses using USPS Web Tools available on the official USPS website and Facebook page, as well as on third-party sites.

==== Delivery Point Validation ====
Delivery Point Validation (DPV) provides the highest level of address accuracy checking. In a DPV process, the address is checked against the AMS data file to ensure that it exists as an active delivery point. The USPS provides DPV on their website as part of the ZIP Code Lookup tool; there are also companies that offer services to perform DPV in bulk.

=== Paying postage ===
Postage can be paid via:

- Stamps purchased online at usps.com, at a post office, from a stamp vending machine or "Automated Postal Center" which can also handle packages, or from a third party (such as a grocery store)
- Pre-cancelled stamps for bulk mailings
- Postal meter
- Prepaid envelope
- Shipping label purchased online and printed by the customer on standard paper (e.g., with Click-N-Ship, or via a third-party such as PayPal or Amazon shipping)

All unused U.S. postage stamps issued since 1861 are still valid as postage at their indicated value. Non-denominated stamps and those with values denominated by a letter are "valid at the original prices of issue". Additionally, Forever Stamps have been sold since 2007, which will always be valid for First-Class Mail up to 1 ounce (28 g), regardless of rate changes. In 2011, all first-class one ounce stamps, except for those sold in select coil sizes, "became forever stamps".

The cost of mailing a 1 oz (28 g) First-Class letter increased to 73 cents on July 14, 2024.

==== Postage meters ====
A postage meter is a mechanical device used to create and apply physical evidence of postage (or franking) to mailed matter. Postage meters are regulated by a country's postal authority; for example, in the United States, the United States Postal Service specifies the rules for the creation, support, and use of postage meters. A postage meter imprints an amount of postage, functioning as a postage stamp, a cancellation and a dated postmark all in one. The meter stamp serves as proof of payment and eliminates the need for adhesive stamps.

==== PC Postage ====
In addition to using standard stamps, postage can now be printed in the form of an electronic stamp, or e-stamp, from a personal computer using a system called Information Based Indicia. This online PC Postage method relies upon application software on the customer's computer contacting a postal security device at the office of the postal service.

=== International services ===
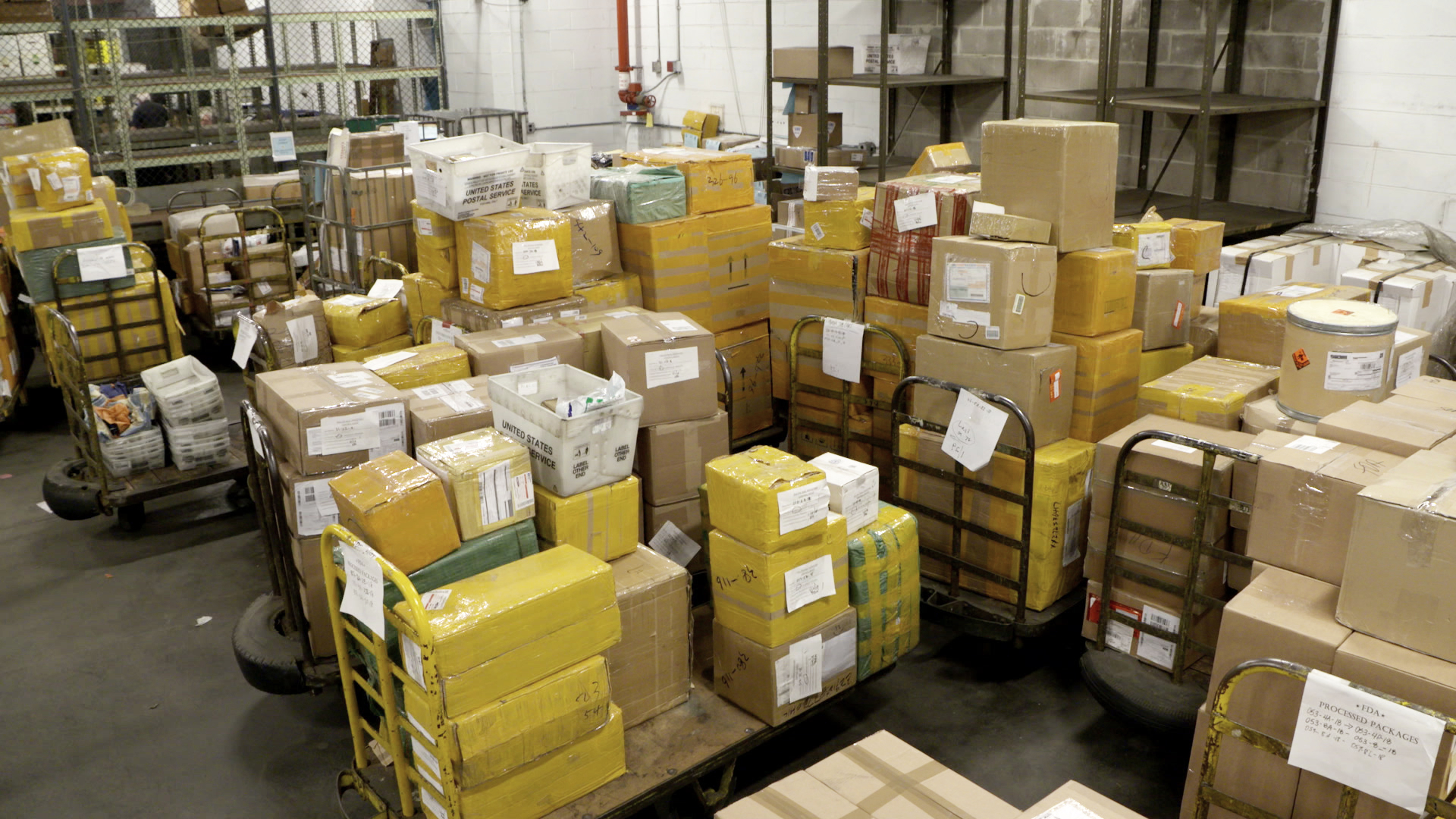
Packages awaiting inspection at the International Mail Facility at John F. Kennedy International Airport

In May 2007, the USPS restructured international service names to correspond with domestic shipping options. Formerly, USPS International services were categorized as Airmail (Letter Post), Economy (Surface) Parcel Post, Airmail Parcel Post, Global Priority, Global Express, and Global Express Guaranteed Mail. The former Airmail (Letter Post) is now First-Class Mail International, and includes small packages weighing up to four pounds (1.8 kg). Economy Parcel Post was discontinued for international service, while Airmail Parcel Post was replaced by Priority Mail International. Priority Mail International Flat-Rate packaging in various sizes was introduced, with the same conditions of service previously used for Global Priority. Global Express is now Priority Mail Express International, while Global Express Guaranteed was unchanged. All international package services come with USPS tracking up until the point it leaves the US, with further tracking availability dependent on the destination country. First-Class Mail letters and flats are not trackable. On September 29, 2024, Global Express Guaranteed service was suspended to all destinations.

One of the major changes in the updated naming and services definitions is that USPS-supplied mailing boxes for Priority and Express mail are allowed for international use. These services are offered to ship letters and packages to almost every country and territory on the globe. The USPS contracts with various commercial and freight airlines to transport mail and packages to their destination. The Fly America act of 1974 mandates that the postal service must use a US Flag Carrier whenever one is available, regardless of cost. Exceptions apply for destinations not served by US carriers.

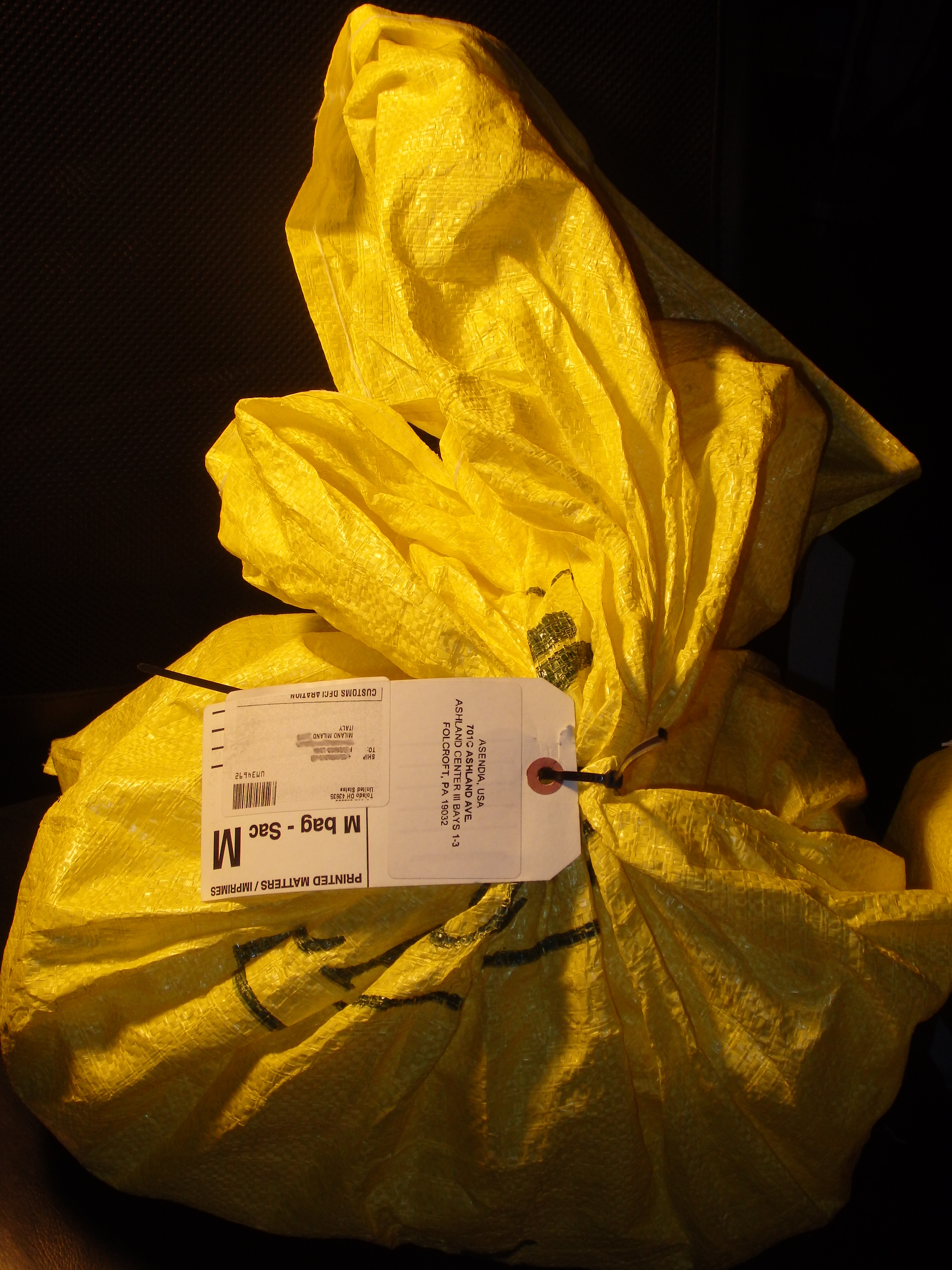
An m-bag

The USPS provides an M-bag service for international shipment of printed matter; previously surface M-bags existed, but with the 2007 elimination of surface mail, only airmail M-bags remain. The term "M-bag" is not expanded in USPS publications; M-bags are simply defined as "direct sacks of printed matter ... sent to a single foreign addressee at a single address"; however, the term is sometimes referred to informally as "media bag", as the bag can also contain "discs, tapes, and cassettes", in addition to books, for which the usual umbrella term is "media"; some also refer to them as "mail bags".

The Department of Defense and the USPS jointly operate a postal system to deliver mail for the military; this is known as the Army Post Office (for Army and Air Force postal facilities) and the Fleet Post Office (for Navy, Marine Corps, and Coast Guard postal facilities). Military mail is billed at domestic rates when being sent from the United States to a military outpost, and is free when sent by deployed military personnel. The overseas logistics are handled by the Military Postal Service Agency in the Department of Defense. Outside of forward areas and active operations, military mail service speeds vary greatly based on location. First-Class takes 7–18 days, Priority 7–18 days, Parcel Select and Media Mail 18–45 days, and Priority Mail Express military takes 3 days, though it is only available to select European, North American, and Pacific posts.

Three independent countries with a Compact of Free Association with the U.S. (Palau, the Marshall Islands, and the Federated States of Micronesia) have a special relationship with the United States Postal Service:

- Each associated state maintains its own government-run mail service for delivery to and pickup from retail customers.
- The associated states are integrated into the USPS addressing and ZIP Code system.
- The USPS is responsible for transporting mail between the United States and the associated states, and between the individual states of the Federated States of Micronesia.
- The associated states synchronize postal services and rates with the USPS.
- The USPS treats mail to and from the associated states as domestic mail. Incoming mail does require customs declarations because, like some U.S. territories, the associated states are outside the main customs territory of the United States.

==== Discontinuation of international surface mail ====
In 2007, the US Postal Service discontinued its outbound international surface mail ("sea mail") service, mainly because of increased costs. Returned undeliverable surface parcels had become an expensive problem for the USPS, since it was often required to take such parcels back.

Domestic surface mail (now "USPS Ground Advantage") remains available. Surface mail transportation also remains available to certain overseas military and diplomatic posts.

Alternatives to international surface mail include:

- International Surface Air Lift (ISAL). The service includes neither tracking nor insurance; but it may be possible to purchase shipping insurance from a third-party company. This service uses air transportation to leave the US but is then entered into the destination country's surface mail network.
- USPS Commercial ePacket. The service is trackable.
- Ordinary first-class international airmail.

Senders can access the International Surface Air Lift and ePacket services through postal wholesalers. Some examples of such wholesalers include:

- Asendia USA (accessible through the Shippo website to users who have an Asendia account),
- Globegistics (now owned by Asendia), and
- APC Postal Logistics.

If a sender sends an ISAL mailing directly through the USPS (without a wholesaler as an intermediary), the minimum weight is 50 pounds per mailing.

=== Sorting and delivery process ===
Mail flow through national infrastructure, as of 2005

Processing of standard sized envelopes and cards is highly automated, including reading of handwritten addresses. Mail from individual customers and public USPS mailboxes is collected by letter carriers into plastic tubs, which are taken to one of approximately 251 Processing and Distribution Centers (P&DCs) across the United States. Each P&DC sorts mail for a given region (typically with a radius of around 200 miles (320 km)) and connects with the national network for interregional mail.

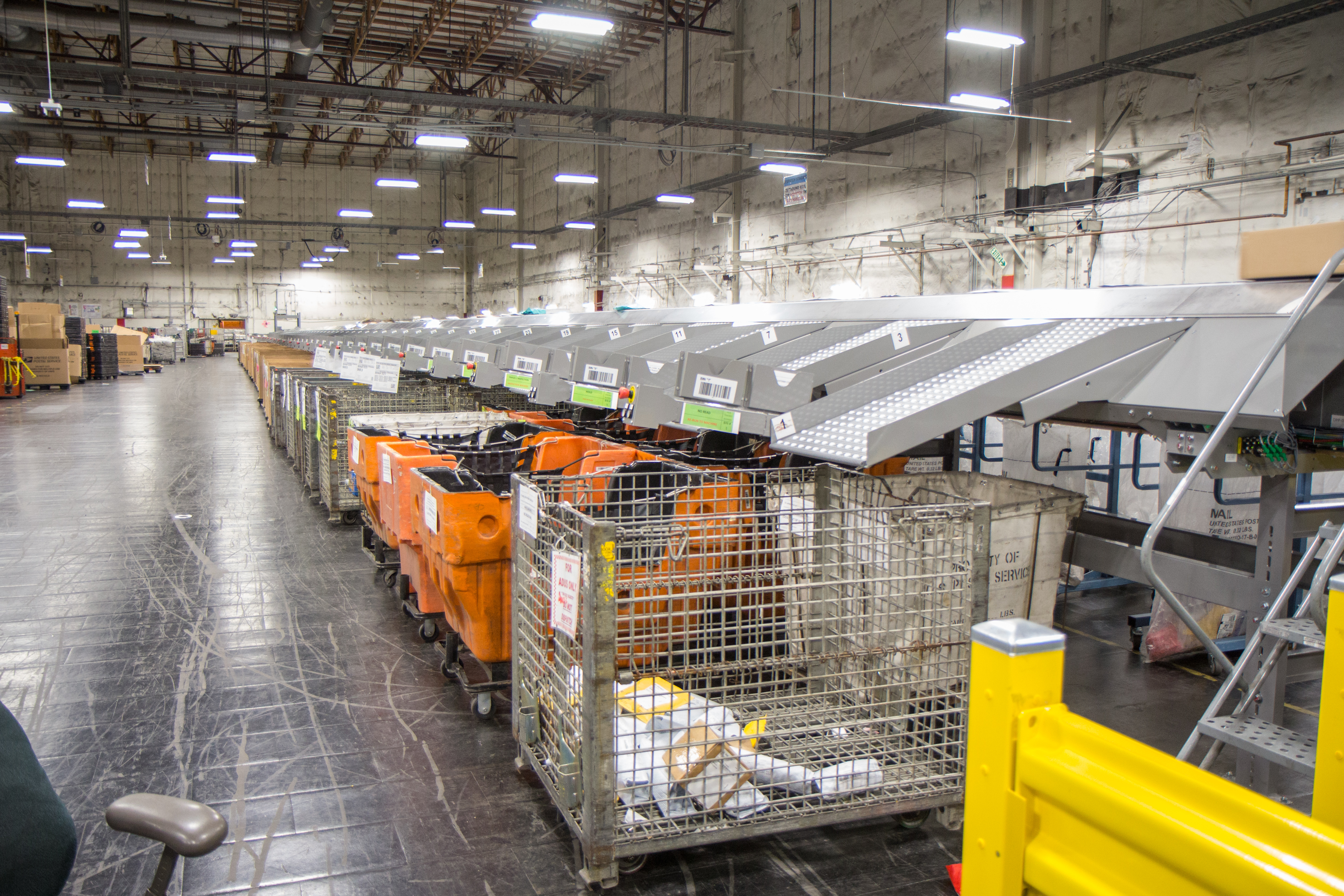
Package sorting equipment in the Seattle Processing & Distribution Center, 2015

Since the late 20th century, the USPS has been reducing point-to-point links in favor of a spoke-hub distribution paradigm, with sorting work tightly concentrated at the hubs. During the 2010s, the USPS consolidated mail sorting for large regions into the P&DCs on the basis that most mail is addressed to faraway destinations, but for cities at the edge of a P&DC's region, this means all locally addressed mail must travel long distances (that is, to and from the P&DC for sorting) to reach nearby addresses.

At the P&DC, mail is emptied into hampers which are automatically dumped into a Dual Pass Rough Cull System (DPRCS). As mail travels through the DPRCS, large items, such as packages and mail bundles, are removed from the stream. As the remaining mail enters the first machine for processing standard mail, the Advanced Facer-Canceler System (AFCS), pieces that passed through the DPRCS but do not conform to physical dimensions for processing in the AFCS (e.g., large envelopes or overstuffed standard envelopes) are automatically diverted from the stream. Mail removed from the DPRCS and AFCS is manually processed or sent to parcel sorting machines.

In contrast to the previous system, which canceled and postmarked the upper right corner of the envelope, thereby missing any stamps which were inappropriately placed, the AFCS locates indicia (stamp or metered postage mark) regardless of the orientation of the mailpiece as it enters the machine, and cancels it by applying a postmark. Detection of indicia enables the AFCS to determine the orientation of each mailpiece and sort it accordingly. The AFCS rotates and flips over mailpieces as needed, so all mail is sorted right-side up and faced in the same direction in each output bin. Mail is sorted by the AFCS into three categories: mail already affixed with a bar code and addressed (such as business reply envelopes and cards); mail with machine printed (typed) addresses; and mail with handwritten addresses. Mail with typed addresses goes to a Multiline Optical Character Reader (MLOCR) which reads the ZIP Code and address information and prints the appropriate bar code onto the envelope (formerly POSTNET, later Intelligent Mail). Mail with handwritten addresses and illegible typed addresses is diverted from the mailstream to the Remote Bar Coding System (RBCS). Images of such mailpieces are transmitted through RBCS to the Remote Encoding Center, where humans (data entry clerks) read each image and type in the most likely address. Each mailpiece held for RBCS processing is sprayed with an ID Tag, a fluorescent bar code. When address data comes back from the Remote Encoding Center, RBCS uses the ID Tag bar code to identify the corresponding mailpiece and prints the appropriate bar code, then returns the mailpiece to the mailstream.

Processed mail is imaged by the Mail Isolation Control and Tracking (MICT) system to allow easier tracking of hazardous substances. Images are taken at more than 200 mail processing centers, and are destroyed after being retained for 30 days.

If a customer has filed a change of address card and his or her mail is detected in the mailstream with the old address, the mailpiece is sent to a machine that automatically connects to a Computerized Forwarding System database to determine the new address. If this address is found, the machine will paste a label over the former address with the current address and the appropriate bar code. The mail is returned to the mailstream to be forwarded to the addressee's new location.

Mail with addresses that cannot be read and bar coded by any of the foregoing automated systems is separated for human intervention. Local postal workers can read the address and manually code and sort mail according to the ZIP Code on the article. If the address still cannot be read, mail is either returned to the sender (First-Class Mail with a valid return address) or is sent to the Mail Recovery Center in Atlanta, Georgia (formerly known as the dead letter office). At this office, the mail is opened to try to find an address to forward to. If an address is found, the contents are resealed and delivered. Otherwise, the items are held for 90 days in case of inquiry by the customer; if they are not claimed, they are either destroyed or auctioned off at the monthly Postal Service Unclaimed Parcel auction to raise money for the service.

Once the mail is bar coded, it is automatically sorted by a Delivery Bar Code Sorter (DBCS) that reads the bar code, identifies the destination of the mailpiece, and sends it to an appropriate tray that corresponds to the next segment of its journey.

There are necessarily two P&DCs for every domestic mailpiece which correspond to the regions in which the sender and recipient are located. The USPS calls these, respectively, the origin and destination P&DCs. Mail for which they are the same (because the senders are located in the same region as the recipients) is either trucked to the appropriate local post office, or kept in the building for carrier routes served directly from the P&DC itself. Out-of-region mail is trucked to the closest airport and then flown, usually as baggage on commercial airlines, to the airport nearest the destination station. At the destination P&DC, mail is again read by a DBCS which sorts items to local post offices; this includes grouping mailpieces by individual letter-carrier route.

At the carrier route level, 95% of letters arrive pre-sorted; the remaining mail must be sorted by hand. In 2009, the Post Office was working to increase the percentage of automatically sorted mail, including a pilot program to sort "flats". UPS is the primary air transport supplier to USPS for Priority and Express Mail. Priority Mail and Express Mail are transported from origin processing centers to the closest UPS-served airport, where they are handed off to UPS. UPS then flies them to the destination airport and hands them back to USPS for transport to the local post office and delivery.

After consolidating sorting work into the P&DCs, the USPS in August 2022 initiated a pilot program to consolidate delivery work into Sorting and Delivery Centers (S&DCs). As of 2022, the USPS was still running "delivery units" out of most of its post offices, meaning that most carrier routes were based at post offices and there were dozens of delivery units in each metropolitan area. The USPS planned to merge many delivery units in each metropolitan area into S&DCs, which implied that many letter carriers would have to endure longer commutes to S&DCs and drive longer delivery routes, while many post offices would be reduced to retail stores with no back-end mail processing capability on site. However, the USPS hoped to save money on the trucking fleet moving mail between its facilities. A 2023 audit by the USPS inspector general found that the facilities selected to serve as the initial S&DCs were operating smoothly and functioning as expected, but criticized the USPS for immediately consolidating workers into the S&DCs before they had been upgraded with adequate amenities like restrooms, break rooms, and locker rooms appropriately sized for such large numbers of employees.

==== Types of postal facilities ====
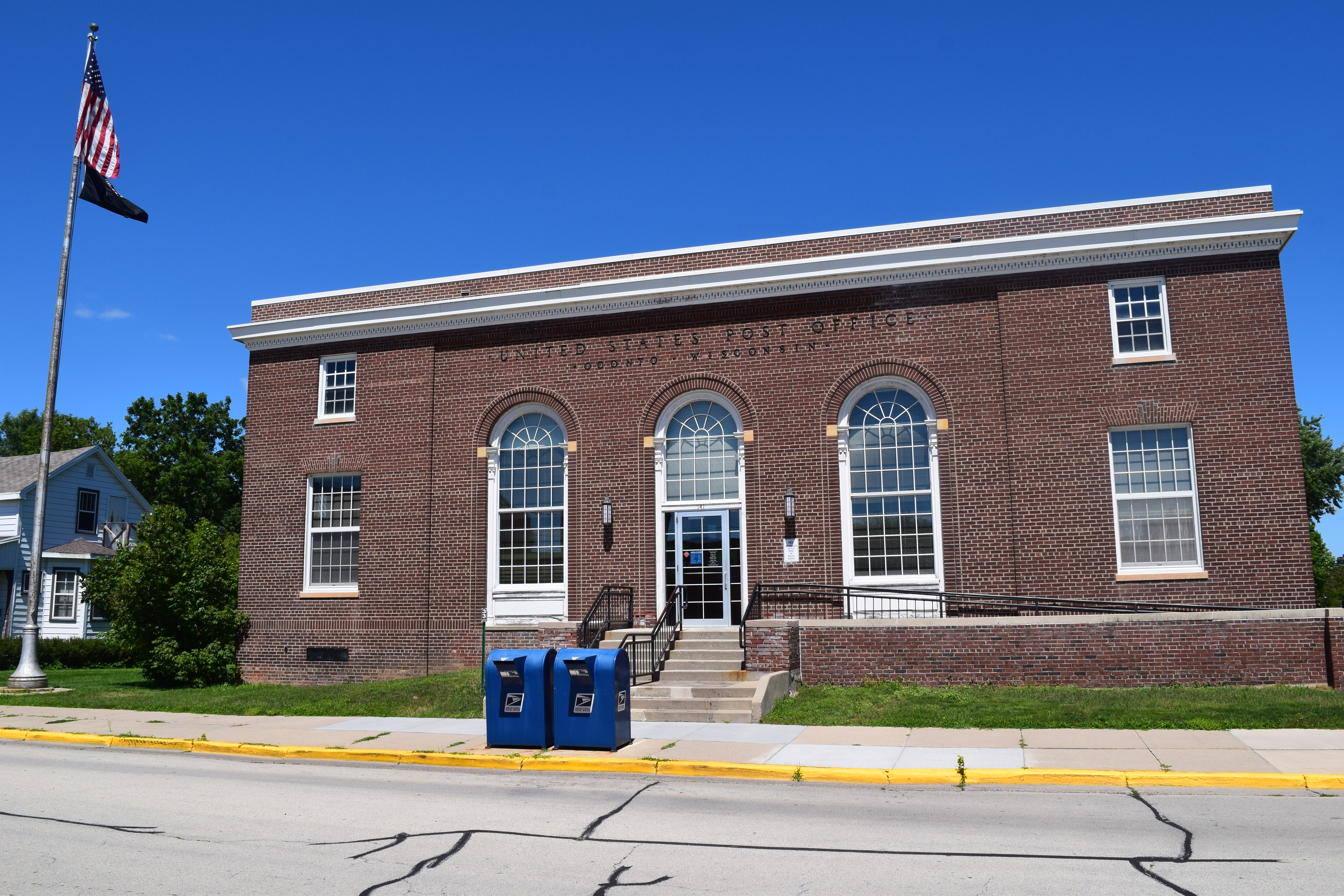
The National Register of Historic Places-listed main post office in Oconto, Wisconsin, built in 1922

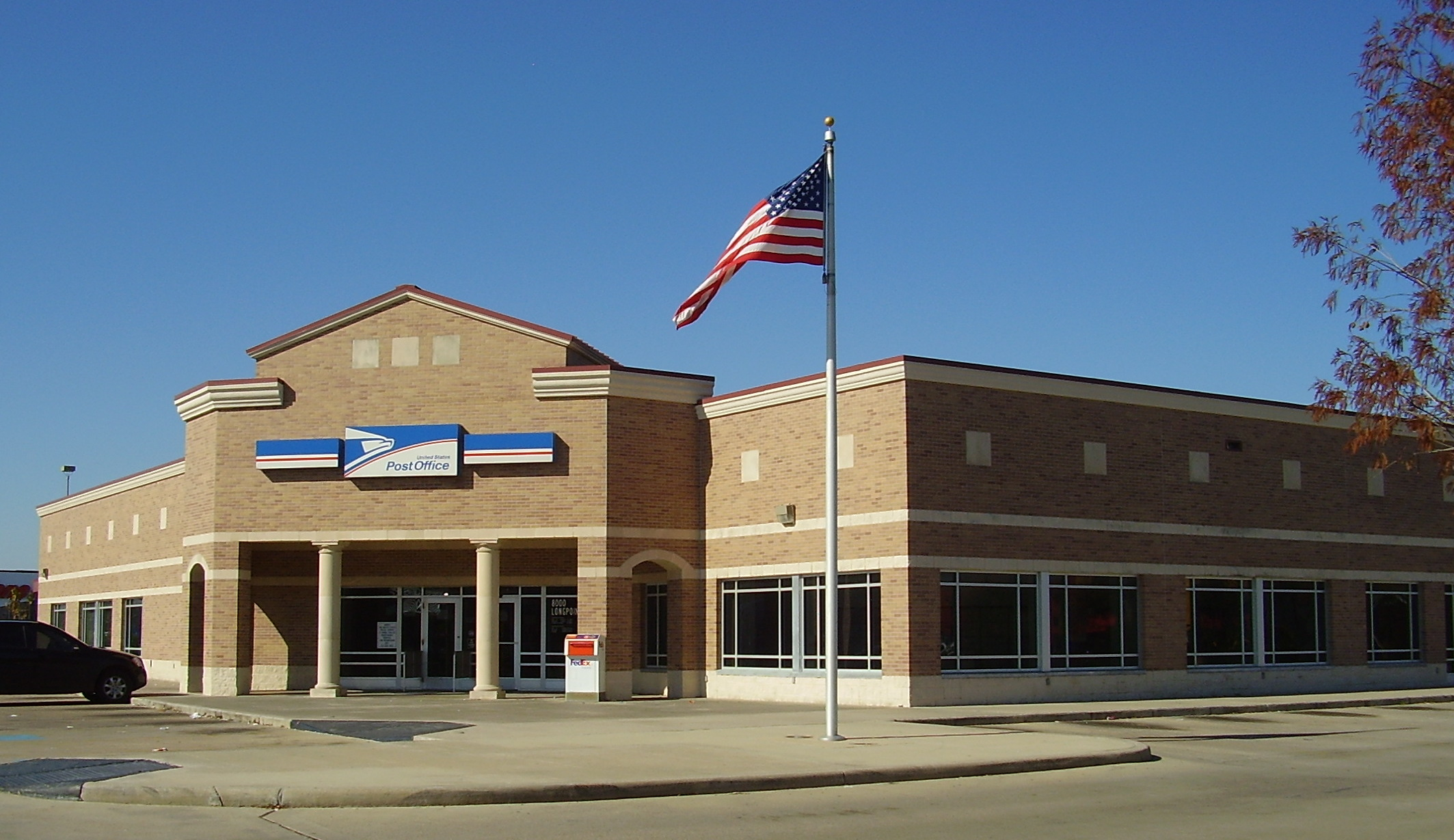
A typical post office station in the Spring Branch area of Houston, Texas

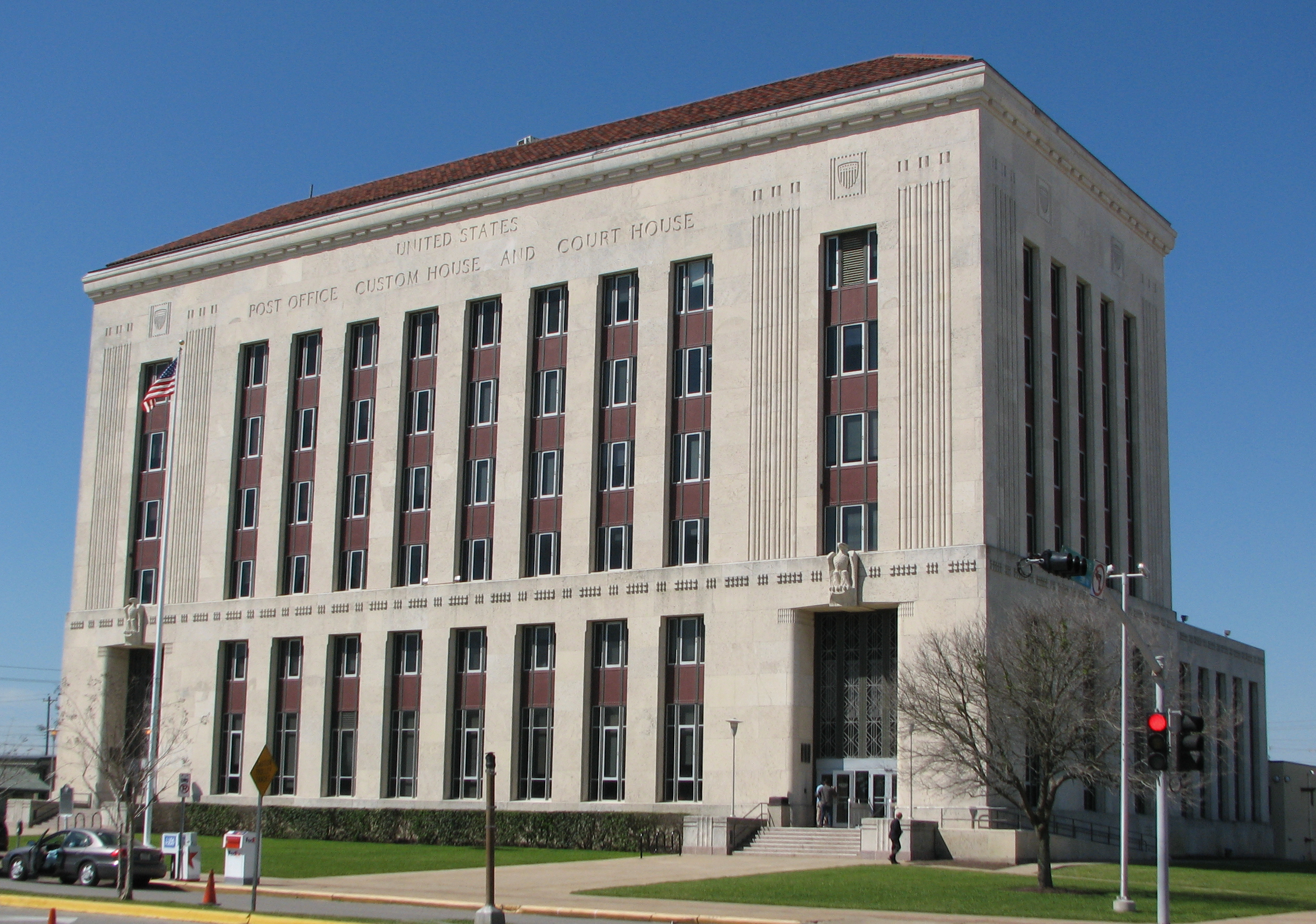
A combined Post Office, Customs House, and Federal Court House in Galveston, Texas

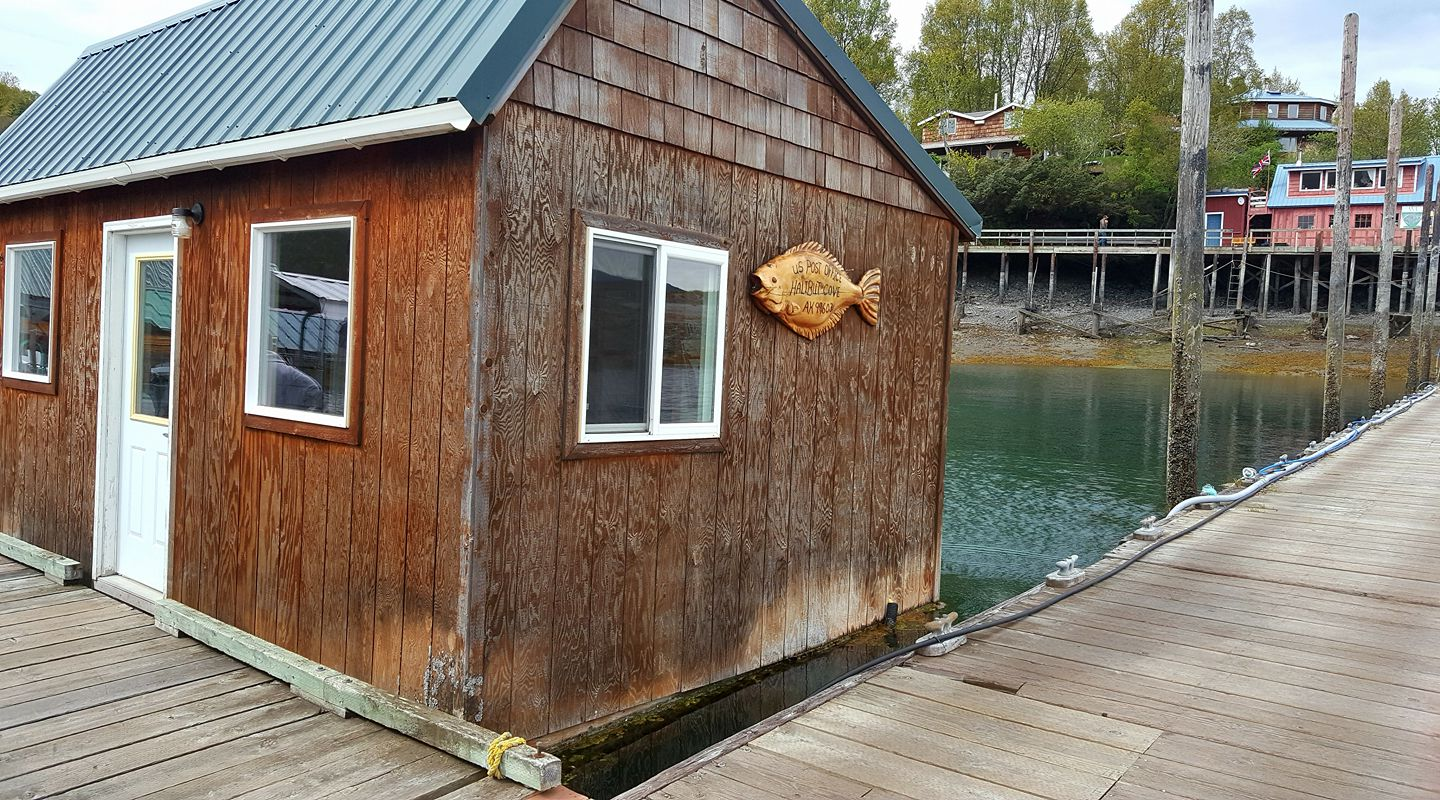
Floating post office, Halibut Cove, Alaska

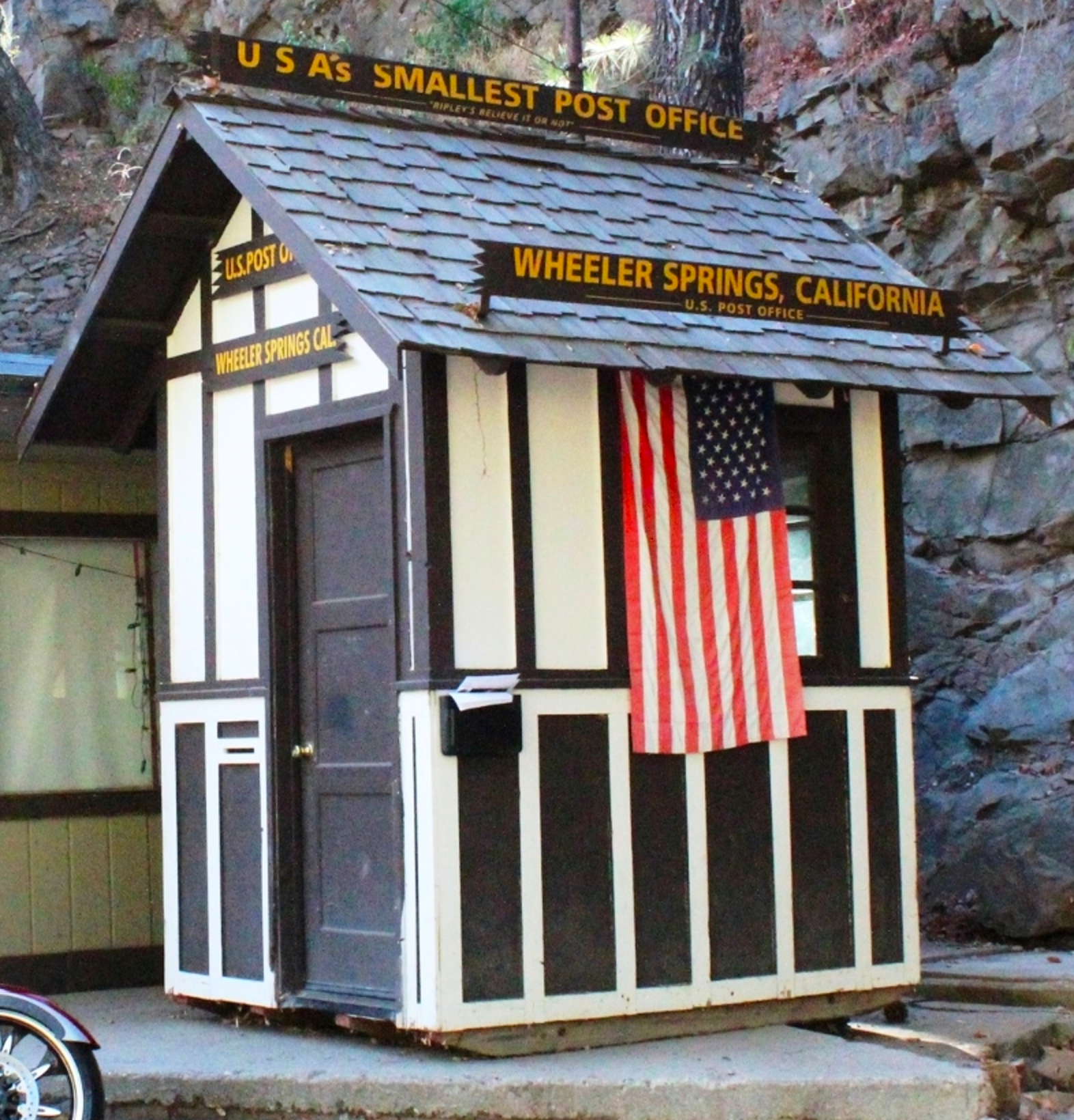
Wheeler Springs, CA, was home to the smallest post office in the U.S.

Although its retail postal facilities are called post offices in regular speech, the USPS recognizes several types of postal facilities, including the following:

- A main post office (formerly known as a general post office) is the primary postal facility in a community.
- A station or post office station is a postal facility that is not the main post office, but that is within the corporate limits of the community.
- A branch or post office branch is a postal facility that is not the main post office and that is outside the corporate limits of the community.
- A classified unit is a station or branch operated by USPS employees in a facility owned or leased by the USPS.
- A contract postal unit (or CPU) is a station or branch operated by a contractor, typically in a store or other place of business.
- A community post office (or CPO) is a contract postal unit providing services in a small community in which other types of post office facilities have been discontinued.
- An approved shipper is an independent shipping business licensed to use certain USPS branding and signage, but which does not receive any financial compensation from USPS and may opt to charge higher rates for postage. Approved Shippers may also accept packages for other carriers such as UPS or FedEx.
- A finance unit is a station or branch that provides window services and accepts mail, but does not provide delivery.
- A village post office (VPO) is an entity such as a local business or government center that provides postal services through a contract with the USPS. First introduced in 2011 as an integral part of the USPS plan to close low volume post offices, village post offices will fill the role of the post office within a ZIP Code.
- A processing and distribution center (P&DC, or processing and distribution facility, formerly known as a General Mail Facility) is a central mail facility that processes and dispatches incoming and outgoing mail to and from a designated service area (251 nationwide).
- A sectional center facility (SCF) is a P&DC for a designated geographical area defined by one or more three-digit ZIP Code prefixes.
- An international service center (ISC) is an international mail processing facility. There are four such USPS facilities in the continental United States, located in Chicago, New York, Miami, and Los Angeles.
- A network distribution center (NDC), formerly known as a bulk mail center (BMC), was a central mail facility that processed bulk rate parcels as the hub in a hub and spoke network. The NDC network was dismantled in 2022–2023 as part of modernization efforts, with NDC duties being returned to the P&DC network. Each of the 20 NDCs is being repurposed to serve the new network.
- An auxiliary sorting facility (ASF) is a central mail facility that processes bulk rate parcels as spokes in a hub and spoke network.
- A remote encoding center (REC) is a facility at which clerks receive images of problem mail pieces (those with hard-to-read addresses, etc.) via secure Internet-type feeds and manually type the addresses they can decipher, using a special encoding protocol. The mail pieces are then sprayed with the correct addresses or are sorted for further handling according to the instructions given via encoding. The total number of RECs is down from 55 in 1998 to just 1 center in December 2016. The last REC is in Salt Lake City, Utah.
- A remotely managed post office (RMPO) is an office with part-time window hours that is staffed by a Postal Service employee but managed remotely by a postmaster at a larger office.
- A part-time post office (PTPO) is a Post Office that offers part-time window service hours, is staffed by a Postal Service employee, and reports to a district office.

While common usage refers to all types of postal facilities as "substations", the USPS Glossary of Postal Terms does not define or even list that word. Post Offices often share facilities with other governmental organizations located within a city's central business district. In those locations, often courthouses and federal buildings, the building is owned by the General Services Administration while the U.S. Postal Services operates as a tenant. The USPS retail system has approximately 36,000 post offices, stations, and branches.

==== Self-Service Kiosks ====
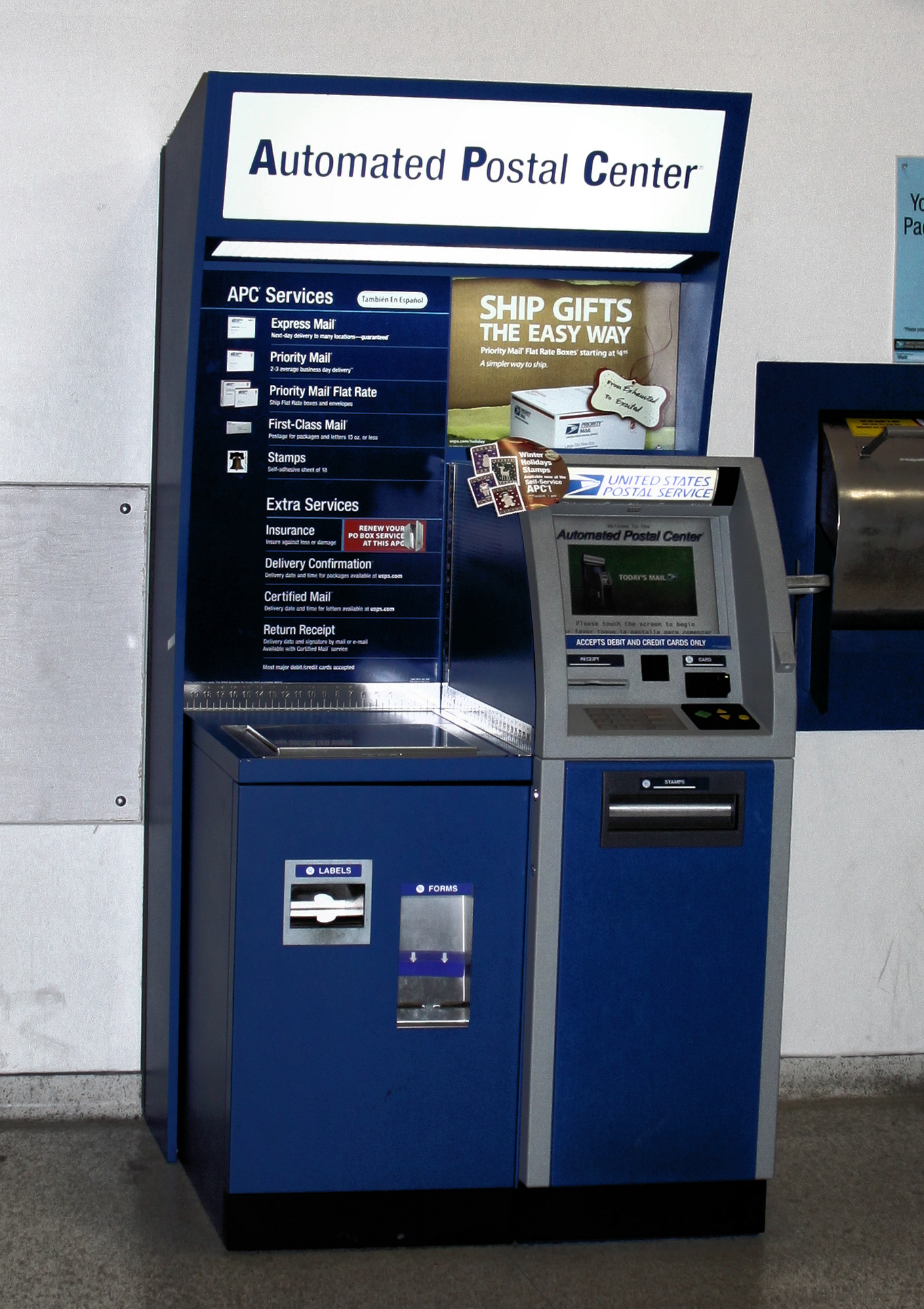
A 24-hour Automated Postal Center kiosk inside the Webster, Texas main post office

In 2004, the USPS began deploying Automated Postal Centers (APCs) at USPS locations. In the early 2010s, the USPS renamed APCs to Self-Service Kiosks (SSKs). Self-Service Kiosks are automated and are able to weigh and mail parcels, letters and flats, renew postal office boxes, and print postage.

==== Evolutionary Network Development (END) program ====
In February 2006, the USPS announced that they plan to replace the nine existing facility-types with five processing facility-types:

- Regional Distribution Centers (RDCs), which will process all classes of parcels and bundles and serve as Surface Transfer Centers;
- Local Processing Centers (LPCs), which will process single-piece letters and flats and cancel mail;
- Destination Processing Centers (DPC), sort the mail for individual letter-carrier route;
- Airport Transfer Centers (ATCs), which will serve as transfer points only; and
- Remote Encoding Centers (RECs).

Over a period of years, these facilities are expected to replace Processing & Distribution Centers, Customer Service Facilities, Bulk Mail Centers, Logistic and Distribution Centers, annexes, the Hub and Spoke Program, Air Mail Centers, and International Service Centers. The changes are a result of the declining volumes of single-piece First-Class Mail, population shifts, the increase in drop shipments by advertising mailers at destinating postal facilities, advancements in equipment and technology, redundancies in the existing network, and the need for operational flexibility. The program was ended in early 2007 after an analysis revealed that the significant amount of capital investment required to implement the END network concept would not generate the benefits originally anticipated.

==== Airline and rail division ====
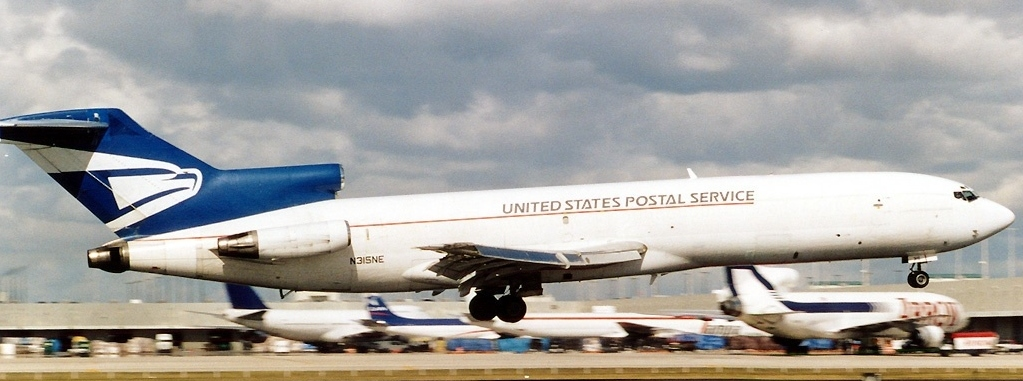
A former United States Postal Service Boeing 727-200 aircraft at Miami International Airport in 1999

The United States Postal Service does not directly own or operate any aircraft or trains, although both were formerly operated. The mail and packages are flown on airlines with which the Postal Service has a contractual agreement. The contracts change periodically. Contract airlines have included: UPS, FedEx Express, American Airlines, United Airlines, Delta Air Lines, Kalitta Air, AmeriJet, Amazon, Northern Air Cargo, and others.

The last air delivery route in the continental U.S., to residents in the Frank Church–River of No Return Wilderness, was scheduled to be ended in June 2009. The weekly bush plane route, contracted out to an air taxi company, had in its final year an annual cost of $46,000, or $2400/year per residence, over ten times the average cost of delivering mail to a residence in the United States. This decision has been reversed by the U.S. postmaster general.

==== Parcel forwarding and private interchange ====
Private US parcel forwarding or US mail forwarding companies focusing on personal shopper, relocation, Ex-pat and mail box services often interface with the United States Postal Service for transporting of mail and packages for their customers.

=== Delivery timing ===
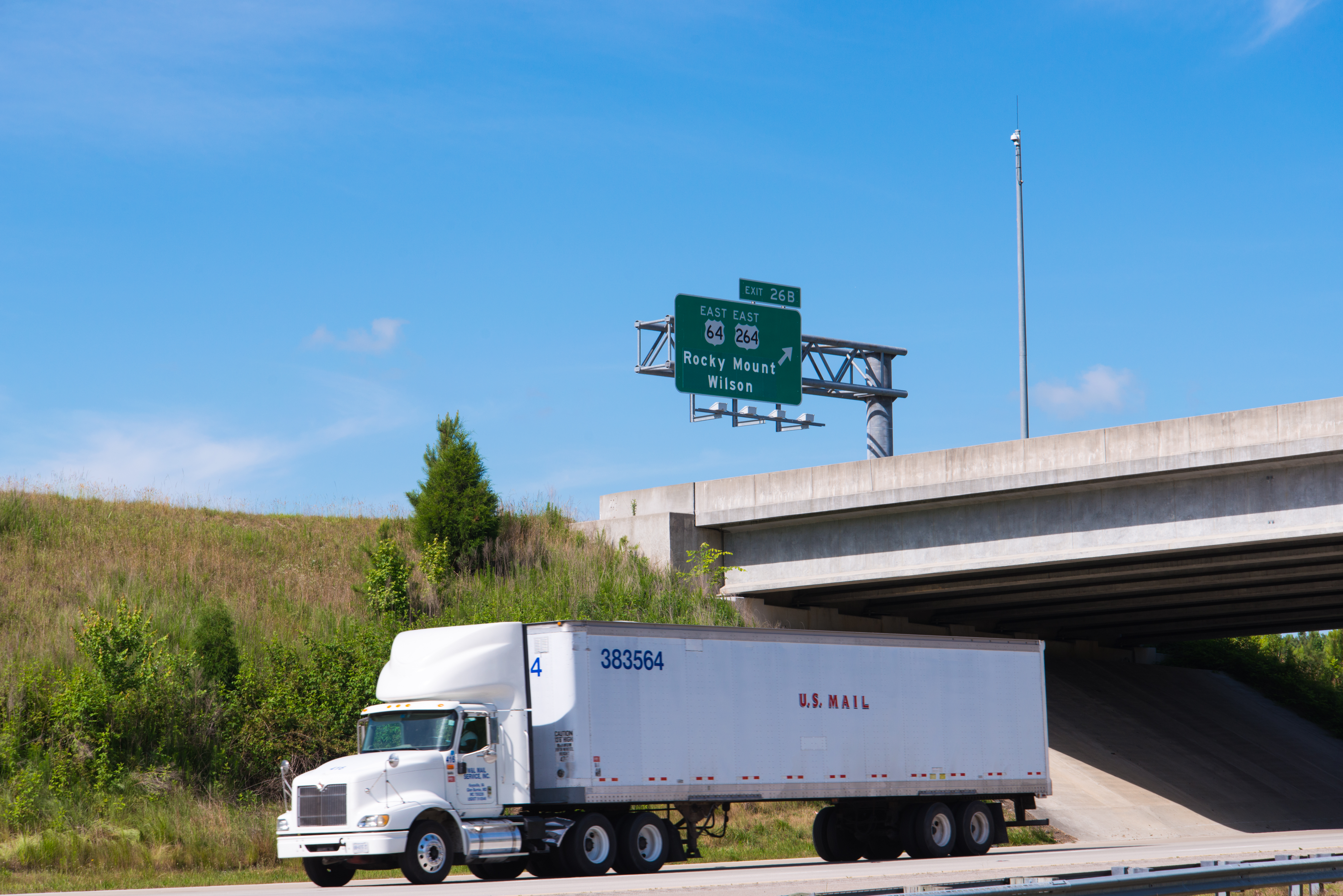
A contractor-operated U.S. Mail semi-truck in Knightdale, North Carolina

==== Delivery days ====
From 1810, mail was delivered seven days a week. In 1828, local religious leaders noticed a decline in Sunday-morning church attendance because of local post offices' doubling as gathering places. These leaders appealed to the government to intervene and close post offices on Sundays. The government, however, declined, and mail was delivered seven days a week until 1912. Since then, U.S. Mail (with the exception of Express Mail) has not been delivered on Sunday.

Saturday delivery was temporarily suspended in April 1957, because of lack of funds, but quickly restored. Budget problems prompted consideration of dropping Saturday delivery starting around 2009. This culminated in a 2013 announcement that regular mail services would be cut to five days a week, which was reversed by Congress before it could take effect. (See the section Revenue decline and planned cuts.)

==== Direct delivery vs. customer pickup ====
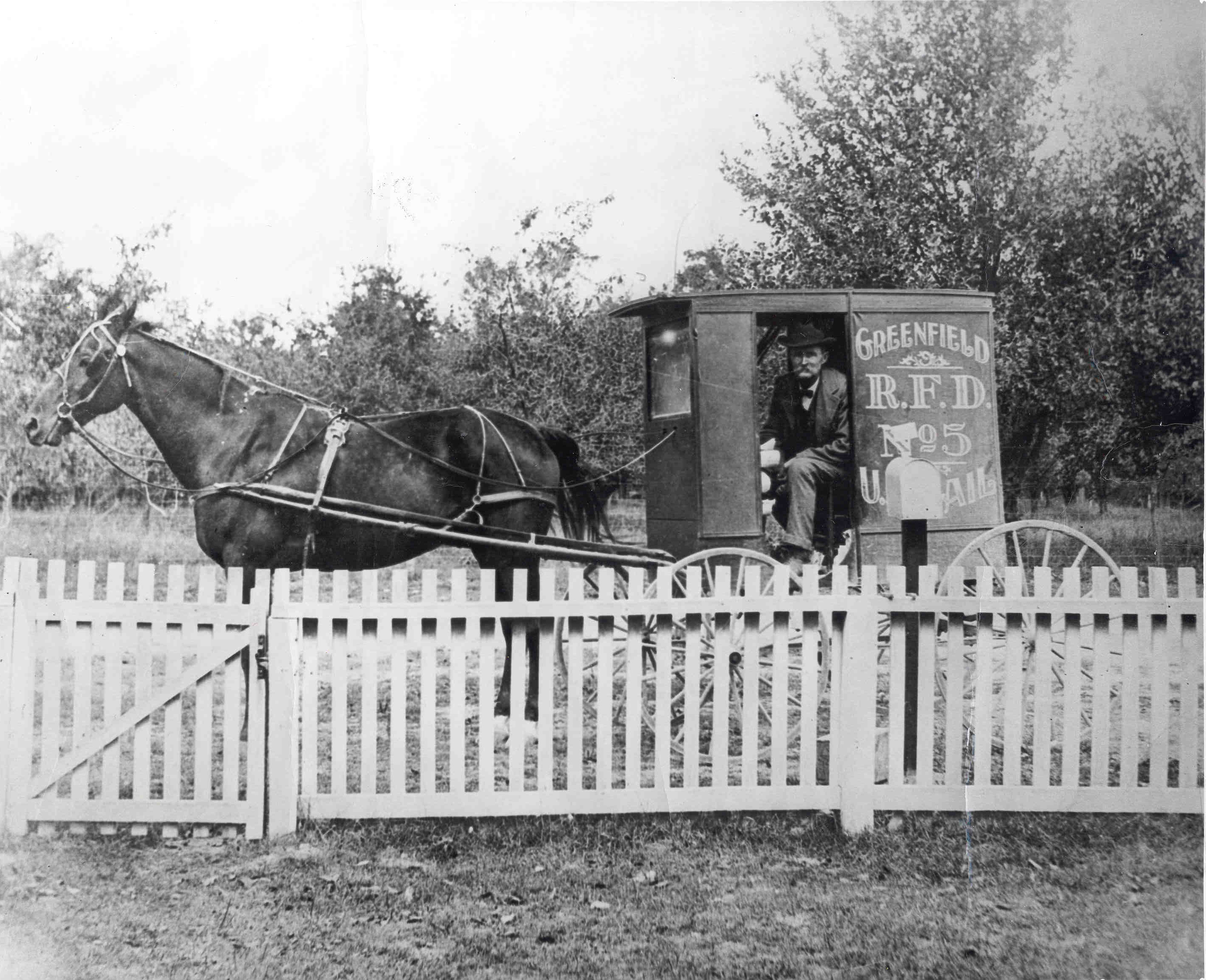
Rural Free Delivery letter carrier near Greenfield, Indiana, 1905

Originally, mail was not delivered to homes and businesses, but to post offices. In 1863, "city delivery" began in urban areas with enough customers to make this economical. This required streets to be named, houses to be numbered, with sidewalks and lighting provided, and these street addresses to be added to envelopes. The number of routes served expanded over time. In 1891, the first experiments with Rural Free Delivery began in less densely populated areas.

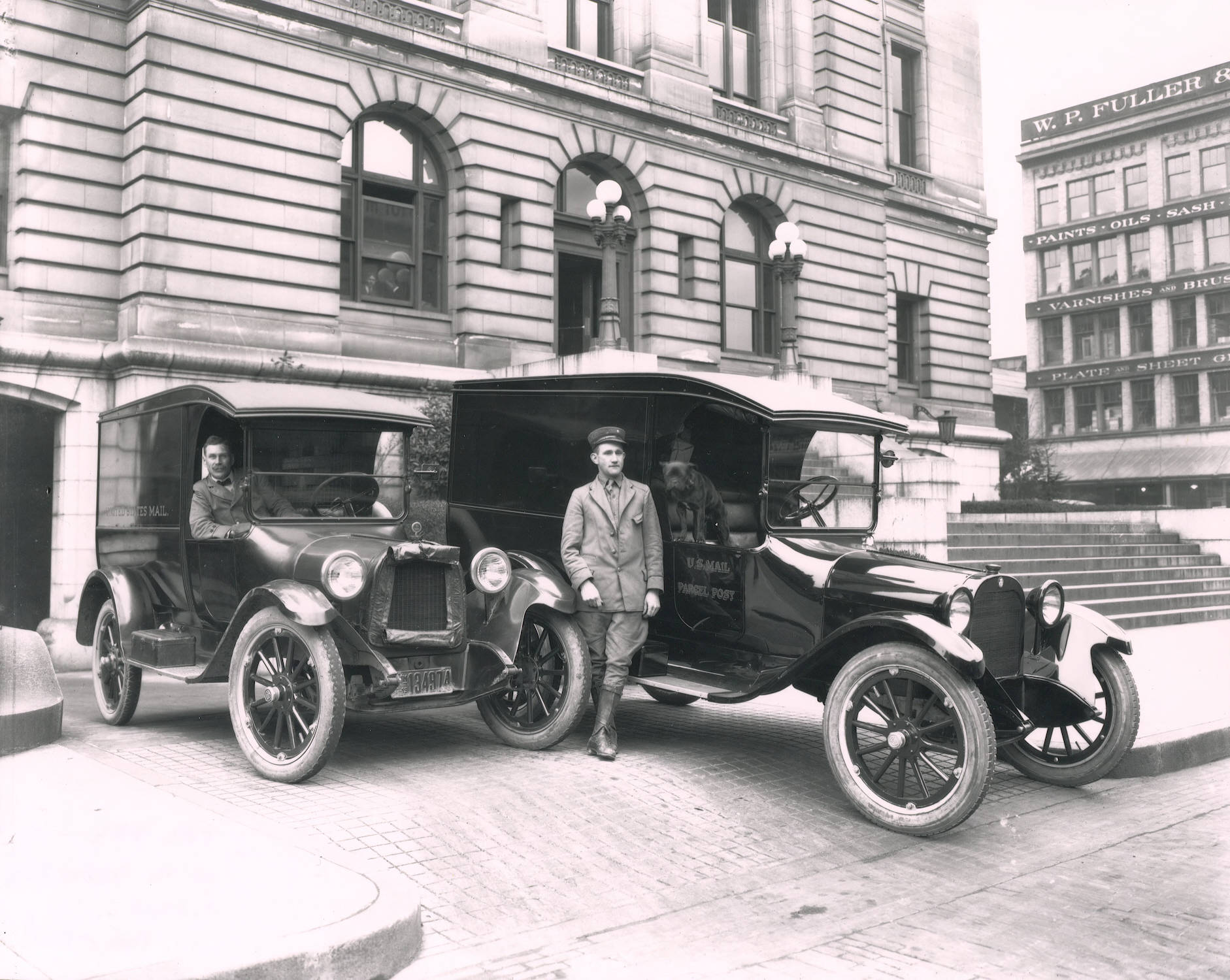
City letter carriers with their trucks in Tacoma, Washington, 1919

To compensate for high mail volume and slow long-distance transportation which saw mail arrive at post offices throughout the day, deliveries were made multiple times a day. This ranged from twice for residential areas to up to seven times for the central business district of Brooklyn, New York. In the late 19th century, mail boxes were encouraged, saving carriers the time it took to deliver directly to the addressee in person. During the 1910s and 1920s, they were phased in as a requirement for service. In the 1940s, multiple daily deliveries began to be reduced, especially on Saturdays. By 1990, the last twice-daily deliveries in New York City were eliminated.

Since then, mail is delivered once a day to most private homes and businesses. The USPS still distinguishes between city delivery (where carriers generally walk and deliver to mailboxes hung on exterior walls or porches, or to commercial reception areas) and rural delivery (where carriers generally drive). With "curbside delivery", mailboxes are at the ends of driveways, on the nearest convenient road. "Central point delivery" is used in some locations, where several nearby residences share a "cluster" of individual mailboxes in a single housing.

Some customers choose to use post office boxes for an additional fee, for privacy or convenience. This provides a locked box at the post office to which mail is addressed and delivered (usually earlier in the day than home delivery). Customers in less densely populated areas where there is no city delivery and who do not qualify for rural delivery may receive mail only through post office boxes. High-volume business customers can also arrange for special pick-up.

Another option is the old-style general delivery, for people who have neither post office boxes nor street addresses. Mail is held at the post office until they present identification and pick it up. Some customers receive free post office boxes if the USPS declines to provide door-to-door delivery to their location or a nearby box. People with medical problems can request door-to-door delivery. Homeless people are also eligible for post office boxes at the discretion of the local postmaster, or can use general delivery.

==== Special delivery ====
From 1885 to 1997, a service called special delivery was available, which caused a separate delivery to the final location earlier in the day than the usual daily rounds.

==== Same-day trials ====
In December 2012, the USPS began a limited one-year trial of same-day deliveries directly from retailers or distribution hubs to residential addresses in the same local area, a service it dubbed "Metro Post". The trial was initially limited to San Francisco and the only retailer to participate in the first few weeks was 1-800-FLOWERS. In November 2013, the Postal Service began regular package delivery on Sundays for Amazon customers in New York and Los Angeles, which it expanded to 15 cities in May 2014. Amazon Sunday delivery has been expanded to most major markets as of September 2015.

==== Forwarding and holds ====
Residential customers can fill out a form in-person or online to forward mail to a new address, and can also send pre-printed forms to any of their frequent correspondents. They must have a valid address to forward their mail from and to, and verify their identity. They can also put their mail on "hold", for example, while on vacation. The Post Office will store mail during the hold, instead of letting it overflow in the mailbox. These services are not available to large buildings and customers of a commercial mail receiving agency, where mail is subsorted by non-Post Office employees into individual mailboxes.

==== First-class packages ====
In April 2022, the USPS announced it would slow deliveries of almost one third of first-class packages as it sought to rely less on air transportation and find cost savings. In July 2023, USPS eliminated First-Class package service and replaced it with USPS Ground Advantage. USPS also greatly reduced the use of air transportation for First Class Mail letters and flats.

== Financial services ==
Postal money orders provide a safe alternative to sending cash through the mail, and are available in any amount up to $1,000. Like a bank check, money orders are cashable only by the recipient. Unlike a personal bank check, they are prepaid and therefore cannot be returned because of insufficient funds. Money orders are a declining business for the USPS, as companies like PayPal, Venmo and others are offering electronic replacements. From 1911 to 1967, the Postal Service also operated the United States Postal Savings System, not unlike a savings and loan association with the amount of the deposit limited. A January 2014 report by the inspector general of the USPS suggested that the agency could earn $8.9 billion per year in revenue by providing financial services, especially in areas where there are no local banks but there is a local post office, and to customers who currently do not have bank accounts.

== Employment ==
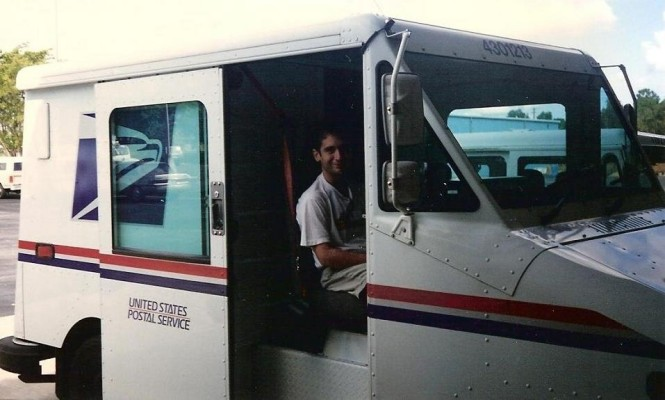
A Rural Letter Carrier from Fort Myers, Florida

The Postal Service is the nation's second-largest civilian employer. As of 2023, it employed 525,469 career employees and 115,000 non-career personnel, divided among offices, processing centers, and actual post offices. The United States Postal Service would rank 43rd on the 2021 Fortune 500 list, if it was a private company and ranks 136 on Global Fortune 500 list. A major round of job cuts, early retirements, and a construction freeze were announced on March 20, 2009.

=== Workplace violence ===
In the early 1990s, widely publicized workplace shootings by disgruntled employees at USPS facilities led to a Human Resource effort to provide care for stressed workers and resources for coworker conflicts. Due to media coverage, postal employees gained a reputation among the general public as more likely to be mentally ill. The USPS Commission on a Safe and Secure Workplace found that "Postal workers are only a third as likely as those in the national workforce to be victims of homicide at work." In the documentary Murder by Proxy: How America Went Postal, it was argued that this number failed to factor out workers killed by external subjects rather than by fellow employees.

This series of events in turn has influenced American culture, as seen in the slang term "going postal".

== In fiction ==
- In the film Miracle on 34th Street (1947), the identity of Kris Kringle (played by Edmund Gwenn) as the one and only "Santa Claus" was validated by a state court, based on the delivery of 21 bags of mail (famously carried into the courtroom) to the character in question. The contention was that it would have been illegal for the United States Post Office to deliver mail that was addressed to "Santa Claus" to the character "Kris Kringle" unless he were, in fact, the one and only Santa Claus. Judge Henry X. Harper (played by Gene Lockhart) ruled that since the U.S. Government had demonstrated through the delivery of the bags of mail that Kris Kringle was Santa Claus, the State of New York did not have the authority to overrule that decision.
- The novel Post Office (1971), written by poet and novelist Charles Bukowski, is a semi-autobiographical account of his life over the years as a letter carrier. Bukowski would, under duress, quit and years later return as a mail clerk. His personal account would detail the work at lengths as frustrating, menial, boring, and degrading.
- David Brin's novel The Postman (1985) portrays the USPS and its returned services as a staple to revive the United States government in a post-apocalyptic world. It was adapted as a film starring Kevin Costner and Larenz Tate in 1997.
- In 2015, The Inspectors, which depicts a group of postal inspectors investigating postal crimes, debuted on CBS. The series uses the USPIS seal and features messages and tips from the Chief Postal Inspector at the end of each episode.
- Signed, Sealed, Delivered (original title: Dead Letters), also known as Lost Letter Mysteries, is an American-Canadian drama/romantic comedy television series that aired on the Hallmark Channel from April 20 through June 22, 2014.
- In the horror film Jacob's Ladder (1990), the main character Jacob Singer (played by Tim Robbins) is an army veteran and letter carrier in New York City.

== See also ==
- Postage stamps and postal history of the United States
- Postal Union of the Americas, Spain and Portugal
- List of national postal services#The Americas
- United States Mail Ship
