= Title 39 of the United States Code =

U.S. federal statutes on the Postal Service

Title 39 of the United States Code outlines the role of United States Postal Service in the United States Code. This title was formerly not divided into parts, but was divided into chapters. This title was divided into six parts by Public Law 86–682 of 2 September 1960. This title was divided into five parts by the Postal Reorganization Act of 1970 (Public Law 91–375):

- Part I—General
- Part II—Personnel
- Part III—Modernization and Fiscal Administration
- Part IV—Mail Matter
- Part V—Transportation of Mail

== Part I — General ==
Part I

- Chapter 1 — Postal policy and definitions
- Chapter 2 — Organization
- Chapter 4 — General authority
- Chapter 5 — Postal Regulatory Commission
- Chapter 6 — Private carriage of letters

== Part II — Personnel ==
Part II

- Chapter 10 — Employment within the Postal Service
- Chapter 12 — Employee-management agreements

== Part III — Modernization and Fiscal Administration ==
Part III

- Chapter 20 — Finance
- Chapter 22 — Convict labor
- Chapter 24 — Appropriations and annual report
- Chapter 26 — Debts and collection
- Chapter 28 — Strategic planning and performance management
- Chapter 29 — Property management

== Part IV — Mail Matter ==
Part IV

- Chapter 30 — Nonmailable matter
- Chapter 32 — Penalty and franked mail
- Chapter 34 — Armed forces and free postage
- Chapter 36 — Postal rates, classes, and services
- Chapter 37 — Nonpostal services

== Part V — Transportation of Mail ==
Part V

- Chapter 50 — General
- [Chapter 52 — Repealed]
- Chapter 54 — Transportation of mail by air
- Chapter 56 — Transportation of mail by vessel
