= Remote Bar Coding System =

Method of sorting mail

Remote Bar Coding System (RBCS), also called Remote Video Encoding (RVE) is a method used by the United States Postal Service during mail sorting to encode the address of letter-sized mailpieces that are not decipherable by a Multiline Optical Character Reader (MLOCR). When an MLOCR does not recognize a valid address on a letter (usually due to hand-written addressing), it sends an image of the mailpiece to a central RBCS (RVE) site where more sophisticated optical character recognition software is able to interpret many hand-written addresses using neural net and fuzzy logic algorithms. If this does not succeed, human operators visually examine the image and enter the address. In both cases, the data is sent back to the originating mail facility where mailpieces are then automatically matched back up with data through the use of a unique fluorescent barcode printed on the back during initial MLOCR attempt and receive a POSTNET barcode representing the full address.

The Remote Bar Coding System consists of hundreds of MLOCR machines, which capture an image of mailpieces throughout the USPS network, the communications hardware and software that transmit this data to the remote site, the specialized hardware and software that initially attempt to interpret the image, and the terminals and human operators that encode the most difficult images.

The system has been in use since 1992. Its algorithms are continually improved by incorporating the results of human operators. Furthermore, successive generations of MLOCR hardware and software would incorporate some of the advances made in computer-based Remote Encoding, in order to minimize the number of mailpieces that need to go through this extra step.
