= George J. Schoeneman =

American government official

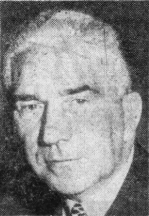
- Schoeneman in 1951

29th Commissioner of Internal Revenue
- In office July 1, 1947 – July 31, 1951
- President: Harry S. Truman
- Preceded by: Joseph D. Nunan Jr.
- Succeeded by: John B. Dunlap

Personal details
- Born: March 4, 1889 Newport, Rhode Island, U.S.
- Died: February 11, 1966 (aged 76) Atlanta, Georgia, U.S.
- Party: Democratic

George J. Schoeneman (March 4, 1889 – February 11, 1966) was an American administrator who served as the Commissioner of Internal Revenue from 1947 to 1951. Prior to that, Schoeneman had served in various roles at the Post Office Department from 1911 to 1919, the Internal Revenue Bureau from 1920 to 1945, and as an assistant to President Harry S. Truman from 1945 to 1947.

== Early life ==
George J. Schoeneman was born in a lighthouse in Newport, Rhode Island, United States, on March 4, 1889, to parents Charles and Catherine Schoeneman. At the time of his birth, Charles served as the lighthouse keeper. Schoeneman attended Newport public schools.

== Career ==
Schoeneman entered the federal government workforce in 1911, when he was hired as a stenographer for the U.S. Post Office Department, where he worked until 1919. At the time of his move to Washington, D.C., he planned to study law at nights, though he quickly became involved in government work and did not have time. He served as executive clerk to the Postmaster General, press relations chief, and assistant superintendent of the division of equipment and supplies during his time there. In the following year, he worked as a secretary of the Federal Reserve Board.

In 1920, Schoeneman moved to the Internal Revenue Bureau as chief of the collector's personnel. By 1929, he was a deputy commissioner for the bureau and held that position up until 1944, when he became assistant commissioner.

In May 1945, President Harry S. Truman made him an administrative assistant for his administration, becoming the special executive assistant just a few months later. In the role, Schoeneman coordinated nearly the entirety of the staff at the White House.

=== Commissioner of Internal Revenue ===
In 1947, following the resignation of Joseph D. Nunan Jr., Schoeneman was selected to serve as Commissioner of Internal Revenue. The New Republic reported in 1951 that Schoeneman was endorsed by both Nunan and former commissioner Robert E. Hannegan, adding that "the machinery they had established over the previous four years continued to function." At the time, the Internal Revenue Bureau was wrapped up in numerous collection scandals.

Schoeneman, liked and respected in Washington as an honest gentleman, was reluctant to question the activities of the local collectors. He appears, from the record, to have been overly gentle in dealing with misconduct in the Bureau.

— Helen Fuller, The New Republic (November 11, 1951)

Schoeneman announced his resignation on June 27, 1951, saying he could "no longer physically stand the strain of the long hours and heavy responsibilities" that his position entailed. His resignation was effective of July 31 that year, and Schoeneman was succeeded by John B. Dunlap.

== Later life and death ==
Schoeneman relocated to Atlanta, Georgia, after his resignation. He died there on February 11, 1966.

== Personal life ==
Schoeneman married Lorena Rouse on October 4, 1916. Together, they had two daughters: Ruth and Bettymae. During his career, his family resided in Chevy Chase, Maryland.
