= Airline deregulation =

Deregulation in the airline sector

Airline deregulation is the process of removing government-imposed entry and price restrictions on airlines affecting, in particular, the carriers permitted to serve specific routes. In the United States, the term usually applies to the Airline Deregulation Act of 1978. A new form of regulation has been developed to some extent to deal with problems such as the allocation of the limited number of slots available at airports.

== Introduction ==
As jets were integrated into the market in the late 1950s and early 1960s, the industry experienced dramatic growth. By the mid-1960s, airlines were carrying roughly 100 million passengers and by the mid-1970s, over 200 million Americans had traveled by air. This steady increase in air travel began placing serious strains on the ability of federal regulators to cope with the increasingly complex nature of air travel. The onset of high inflation, low economic growth, falling productivity, rising labor costs and higher fuel costs proved problematic to the airlines.

Although it is generally recognized that the purpose behind government regulation is to create a stable industry.

In order to address these growing concerns airline deregulation began in the U.S. in 1978. It was, and still is, a part of a sweeping experiment to ultimately reduce ticket prices and entry controls holding sway over new airline hopefuls.

Globally, state supported airlines are still relatively common, maintaining control over ticket prices and route entry, but many countries have since deregulated their own domestic airline markets. A similar but less laissez-faire approach has been taken by the European Union, Australia, United Kingdom, Scandinavia, Ireland and select South and Central American nations.

== In the United States ==
In the early days of interstate air travel, the prevalent thought at the time was that government regulation was necessary to protect and promote the fledgling industry. For example, the then dominant rail industry was forbidden from a financial interest in airlines to prevent them from smothering competition in the industry. Congress created the Civil Aeronautics Authority, which became the Civil Aeronautics Board (CAB), and gave the CAB the power to regulate airline routes, control entry to and exit from the market, and mandate service rates, to investigate accidents, certify aircraft and pilots, to create rules for air traffic control (ATC) and to recommend new rules to prevent repetition of previous accidents. Additional airline safety regulation came later with the passage of the Federal Aviation Act of 1958, which created the Federal Aviation Administration (FAA) as a separate regulatory body.

=== Civil Aeronautics Board ===
In 1938 the U.S. government, through the Civil Aeronautics Board (CAB), regulated many areas of commercial aviation such as routes, fares and schedules. The CAB had three main functions: to award routes to airlines, to limit the entry of air carriers into new markets, and to regulate fares for passengers.

Much of the established practices of commercial passenger travel within the U.S., went back even farther, to the policies of Walter Folger Brown, the U.S. postmaster general from 1929 to 1933 in the administration of President Herbert Hoover. After passage of the Air Mail Act of 1930, also known as the McNary-Watres act, Brown had changed the mail payments system to encourage the manufacture of passenger aircraft instead of mail carrying aircraft. His influence was crucial in awarding contracts so as to create four major domestic airlines: United, American, Eastern, and Transcontinental and Western Air (TWA). Contracts for each of three transcontinental air mail routes were awarded to United Aircraft and Transport Corporation (later United), Robertson Aircraft Corporation (later American), and Transcontinental Air Transport (later TWA). The contract for the New York to Washington route was awarded to Eastern Air Transport, which would later become Eastern Air Lines. By 1933, United, American, TWA, and Eastern accounted for about 94% of air mail revenue. Similarly, Brown had also helped give Pan American a monopoly on international routes. (See also the U.S. Centennial of Flight Commission)

Typical regulatory thinking from the 1940s onward is evident in a Civil Aeronautics Board report. In the absence of particular circumstances presenting an affirmative reason for a new carrier, there appears to be no inherent desirability of increasing the present number of carriers merely for the purpose of numerically enlarging the industry.

=== Airline Deregulation Act ===
The Airline Deregulation Act of 1978 removed many of the previously mentioned controls. Prior to deregulation, it was required that airlines first seek regulatory approval to serve any given route. Thus incumbent airline operators could raise barriers to the challenge of new competition. This system was dismantled as a result of the Airline Deregulation Act. (See also the Centennial of Flight Commission) It also dismantled the notion of a flag carrier.

The Airline Deregulation Act was preceded, by a year, by the Air Cargo Deregulation Act of 1977, that substantially removed limitations on competition in domestic air freight.

== Post-deregulation ==
In the wake of deregulation, airlines adopted new strategies and consumers experienced a new market. Below are the marquee effects of deregulation.

=== Hub and spoke ===
In the immediate aftermath of deregulation, many large airlines adopted a hub-and-spoke system. In this system, several smaller routes ("spokes") are connected to a single larger route ("hubs") are selected an airport, the hub, as the point for flights from a number of origination cities, the spokes. Because hubs allowed passenger travel to be consolidated in "transfer stations", capacity utilization increased, decreasing costs and lowering ticket prices.

=== Low-cost carriers ===
While deregulation led legacy airlines to switch to a hub-and-spoke model, the old point-to-point transit model was quickly adopted by the new generation of low-cost carriers (LCCs) that emerged in the 1970s and 80s. While previously, LCCs such as Southwest Airlines were only permitted to serve routes that did not cross state borders (placing them outside the purview of the CAB), deregulation allowed low-cost airlines to choose their own domestic routes, fares, and schedules, increasing competition across state lines and creating new markets outside the two largest states (California and Texas). As the cost of flying dropped, the number of potential customers increased, making many smaller routes viable.

=== Price ===
Base ticket prices have declined steadily since deregulation. The inflation-adjusted 1982 constant dollar yield for airlines has fallen from 12.3 cents in 1978 to 7.9 cents in 1997, and the inflation-adjusted real price of flying fell 44.9% from 1978 to 2011. Along with a rising U.S. population and the increasing demand of workforce mobility, these trends were some of the catalysts for dramatic expansion in passenger miles flown, increasing from 250 million passenger miles in 1978 to 750 million passenger miles in 2005.

=== Service quality ===
Over the past several years the public's view of airline service quality has shown a significant drop. According to the 2008 American Customer Satisfaction Index, a University of Michigan study of 80,000 consumers' expectations and preferences, the major US airlines ranked last among all the industries surveyed. In 2009, the airlines have moved up to being one point ahead of Cable & Satellite TV and the newspaper industry (though results for all industries were not available at the time of this writing).

In 2011 Congress finally responded to repeated calls for the United States government to pass an "Air Passenger Bill of Rights" to provide specific requirements about what must happen to air passengers in certain conditions. The push for the bill stemmed from several high-profile passenger strandings over the last several years. On April 25, 2011, the Enhancing Airline Passenger Protections rule, 76 Fed. Reg. 32,110, was enacted. Among other items, the rule includes raising the minimum "denied boarding compensation" to customers with valid tickets yet still not allowed to board the aircraft. The legislation further penalizes airlines up to $27,500 a passenger if left stranded aboard an aircraft, on a tarmac for more than three hours. In 2010, the largest trade associations representing airline management interests before Capitol Hill, Airlines for America and the Regional Airline Association, opposed this legislation stating that they could self-regulate themselves and they already had begun implementing systems by which to mitigate any tarmac delays. Later American Eagle, an RAA airline member, was the first airline to be fined under the new legislation. A total settlement including fines and compensation paid to passengers totaled $800,000 for tarmac delays incurred in Chicago in May 2011.

Deregulation advocate Alfred Kahn noted a deterioration in the quality of airline service following deregulation, including the "turmoil" of massive restructuring of airline routes, price wars, conflicts with airline employee unions, airline bankruptcies, and industry consolidation. He also noted unexpected congestion and delays "that have plagued air travelers in recent years". However, he also argued that such congestion and delays was also a sign of deregulation success (because they were caused by lower prices leading Americans to book more flights). Kahn considered the turmoil, congestion, and delays to be unforeseen "surprises" from deregulation, but believed they continued to support deregulation in spite of these events.

=== Competition among carriers ===
A major goal of airline deregulation was to increase competition between airline carriers, leading to price decreases. As a result of deregulation, barriers to entry into the airlines industry for a potential new airline decreased significantly, resulting in many new airlines entering the market, thus increasing competition.

=== Effects on airline staff ===
A key indicator of the volatility of deregulation from 1976 to 1986 in the U.S. revolves around employee affairs. Airlines saw a 39% increase in employees (according to Alfred Kahn), and saw continued yet less rapid growth throughout the 1990s. Subsequently, between 2000 and 2008, 100,000 jobs were shed - approximately 20% - and formerly busy hub airports (such as Pittsburgh and St. Louis) reduced staffing due to a significantly decreased number of flights.

Immediately following the September 11th attacks, the Air Transportation Safety and System Stabilization Act provided the U.S. airlines with $15 billion in loans and an additional $5 billion in grants by the U.S. government. Despite these loans and grants, nearly every major carrier fired 20% of its staff, with United and American both cutting 20,000 jobs. It is difficult to determine the precise job losses due to the effects of deregulation, given such layoffs. Then-retired former CEO of American Airlines Robert Crandall stated, "I'm not sure 9/11 by itself had any particular profound impact [on the industry], but it exacerbated the problems they had before 9/11."

Although regular pay-cuts had become commonplace in the years following deregulation, of the employees remaining after September 11, 2001, the average pay cut has been 18%, with many of the highest earners seeing as much as 40% reductions. Further, virtually every regularly scheduled airline has shifted its pension obligations to its employees.

According to a study by economist David Card, deregulation resulted in the shift of approximately 5,000 to 7,000 airline mechanic jobs from the major trunk airlines to smaller carriers between 1978 and 1984. Because such smaller carriers typically pay less than the major airlines, the average hourly wage of airline mechanics decreased by up to 5 percent; however, this decrease is said to be relatively small.

=== Open Skies ===
Beyond the domestic liberalization of the airlines in the U.S., Open Skies agreements are bilateral agreements between the U.S. and other countries to open the aviation market to foreign access and remove barriers to competition. The U.S. has Open Skies agreements with more than 125 countries. The US government states that Open Skies agreements have been successful at removing many of the government-implemented barriers to competition and allowing airlines to have foreign partners, access to international routes to and from their home countries, and freedom from many traditional forms of economic regulation.

== Criticisms ==
With long standing companies like Braniff, TWA, and Pan Am disappearing through bankruptcy since 1978, the years since 2000 have seen every remaining legacy carrier file for bankruptcy at least once, with the exception of Alaska Airlines. US Airways filed twice in the same number of years. During the same time period, Southwest Airlines continued to expand its route structure, buy new airplanes, and hire more employees, while remaining profitable. JetBlue, a new airline that started up in 1999, "was one of only a few U.S. airlines that made a profit during the sharp downturn in airline travel following the September 11, 2001 attacks. For many years, analysts had predicted that JetBlue's growth rate would become unsustainable. Despite this, the airline continued to add planes and routes to the fleet at a brisk pace. JetBlue is one of the largest airlines in the Northeast United States."

Various proposals have been made by labor unions, former management and industry analysts, including federal price controls and mandated routes served by major airlines with the intent of increasing both prices and competition.

In June 2008 former CEO of American Airlines, Robert Crandall stated,

The consequences of deregulation have been very adverse. Our airlines, once world leaders, are now laggards in every category, including fleet age, service quality and international reputation. Fewer and fewer flights are on time. Airport congestion has become a staple of late-night comedy shows. An even higher percentage of bags are lost or misplaced. Last-minute seats are harder and harder to find. Passenger complaints have skyrocketed. Airline service, by any standard, has become unacceptable.

Crandall has also criticized deregulation for causing airlines to cut services to smaller airports, resulting in a "relatively unsatisfactory transportation network;" he argues that this "has accelerated the movement of people toward the big cities and has discouraged the creation of medium-sized cities."

== See also ==
- Wright Amendment, a U.S. Federal law to protect one Texas airport (Dallas/Fort Worth International Airport) from competition only months after the Airline Deregulation Act of 1978 was signed into law.
- Deregulation of Australian aviation

== Notes ==
Source 1 needs updating to Table 1-37: U.S. Air Carrier Aircraft Departures, Enplaned Revenue Passengers, and Enplaned Revenue Tons | Bureau of Transportation Statistics. (n.d.). Retrieved December 11, 2015, from https://www.bts.gov/content/us-air-carrier-aircraft-departures-enplaned-revenue-passengers-and-enplaned-revenue-tons

== References and further reading ==
- Avent-Holt, Dustin. (2012) "The political dynamics of market organization: Cultural framing, neoliberalism, and the case of airline deregulation." Sociological Theory 30.4 (2012): 283–302.
- Brown, John Howard. (2014) "Jimmy Carter, Alfred Kahn, and airline deregulation: Anatomy of a policy success." Independent Review 19.1 (2014): 85-99 online.
- Button, Kenneth, ed. (2017) Airline deregulation: international experiences (Routledge, 2017).
- Button, Kenneth. (2015) "A Book, the Application, and the Outcomes: How Right Was Alfred Kahn in the Economics of Regulation about the Effects of the Deregulation of the US Domestic Airline Market?." History of Political Economy 47.1 (2015): 1-39.
- Goetz, Andrew R., and Timothy M. Vowles. (2009) "The good, the bad, and the ugly: 30 years of US airline deregulation." Journal of Transport Geography 17.4 (2009): 251–263. online
- Goetz, A. R., Sutton, J. C., (1997), "The Geography of Deregulation in the U.S. Airline Industry," Annals of the Association of American Geographers 87#2 (Jun., 1997), pp. 238–262,
- Kahn, A. E. (1988), "Surprises of Airline Deregulation", American Economic Review, Papers and Proceedings 78, no. 2: 316–22.
- McDonnell, Gary. (2015) "What Caused Airline Deregulation: Economists or Economics?." Independent Review 19.3 (2015): 379-395 online.
- Morrison, Steven, and Clifford Winston. (2010) The economic effects of airline deregulation (Brookings Institution Press, 2010).
- Poole, R. W. Jr., Butler V., (1999), "Airline Deregulation: The Unfinished Revolution," Regulation, vol. 22, no. 1, Spring 1999, pp. 8.,
- Rose, Nancy L. (2012) "After airline deregulation and Alfred E. Kahn." American Economic Review 102.3 (2012): 376-80 online.
- Sinha, Dipendra. (2018) Deregulation and liberalisation of the airline industry: Asia, Europe, North America and Oceania (Routledge, 2019).
- Thierer, A. D. (1998), 20th Anniversary of Airline Deregulation: Cause for Celebration, Not Re-Regulation, (The Heritage Foundation) ^{[unfit]}
- Williams, George. (2017) The airline industry and the impact of deregulation (Routledge, 2017).
