= Jesse M. Donaldson =

53rd U.S. Postmaster General (1885–1970)

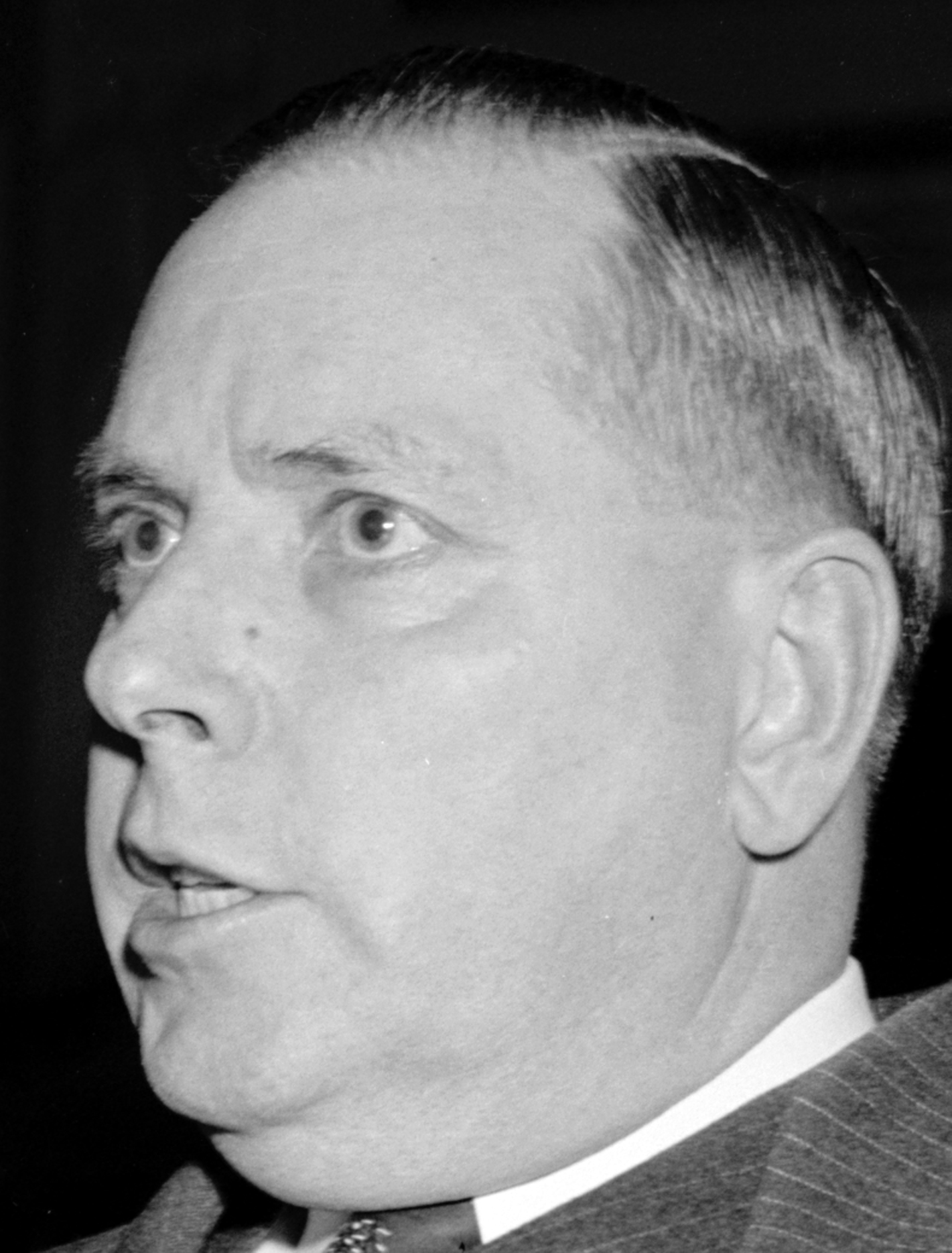
- Donaldson in 1939

53rd United States Postmaster General
- In office December 16, 1947 – January 20, 1953
- President: Harry S. Truman
- Preceded by: Robert E. Hannegan
- Succeeded by: Arthur Summerfield

Personal details
- Born: Jesse Monroe Donaldson; August 17, 1885 Shelbyville, Illinois, U.S.
- Died: March 25, 1970 (aged 84) Kansas City, Missouri, U.S.
- Resting place: Forest Hill Calvary Cemetery; Kansas City, Missouri, U.S.
- Party: Democratic
- Spouse: Nell Graybill (m. 1911)
- Children: 3

Jesse Monroe Donaldson (August 17, 1885 – March 25, 1970) was the first United States Postmaster General to have started his career as a letter carrier.

== Biography ==
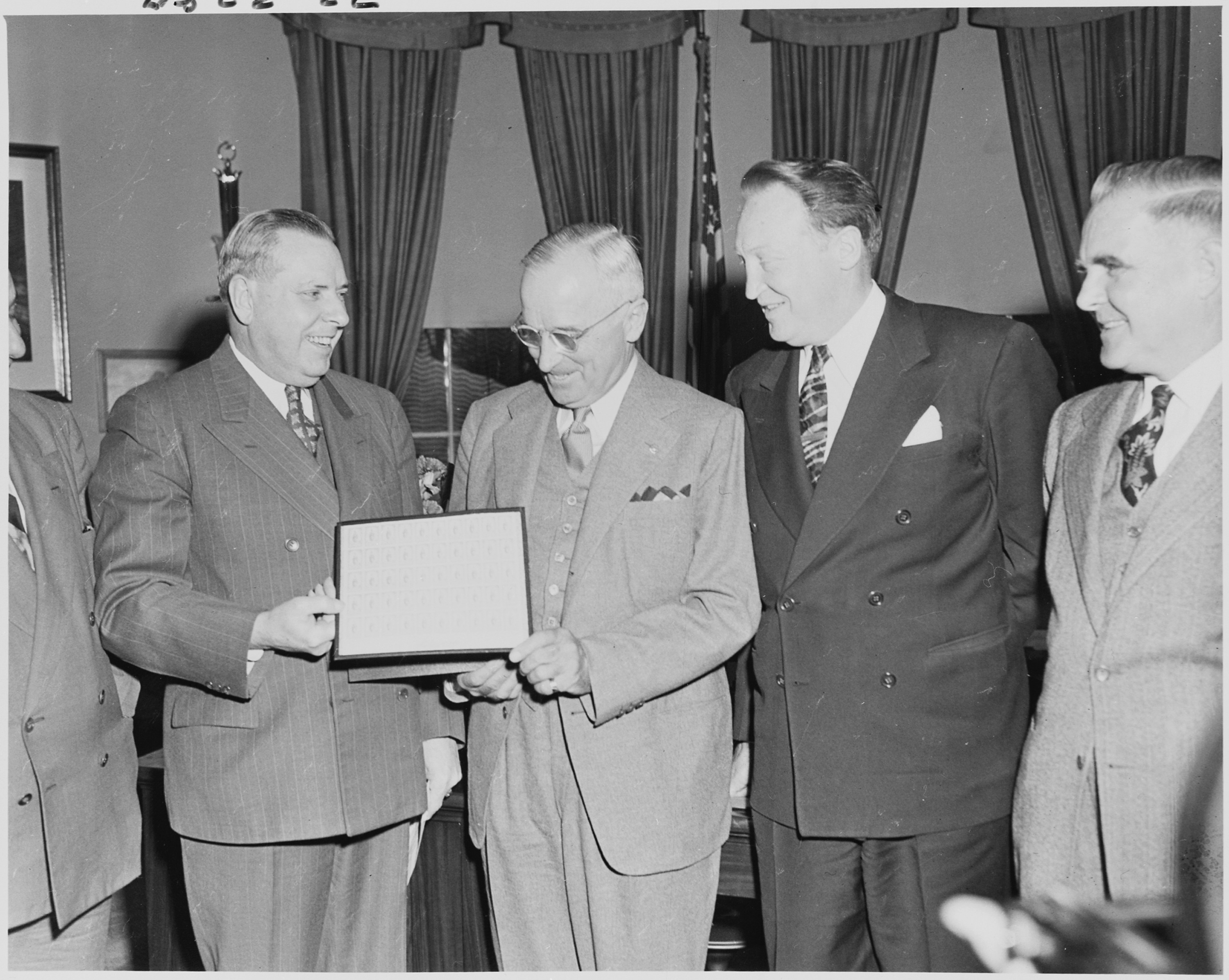
Postmaster General Jesse M. Donaldson (left) at the President Truman's Oval Office to taking his new Freedom Stamps, (April 1950).

Donaldson was born in Shelbyville, Illinois. He was the son of merchant and local postmaster Moses Martin Donaldson, and his wife, Amanda Saletha Little. Donaldson was a Methodist and a Freemason. Donaldson married Nell Fern Graybill on August 14, 1911, with whom he had three children. Donaldson began his postal career in 1908, as the one of three mailmen for the Shelbyville, Illinois, then rose through the ranks of the department.

He was appointed U.S. Postmaster General by President Harry S. Truman on December 16, 1947, following the resignation of Robert E. Hannegan. He served for the remainder from the Truman's administration until January 20, 1953. During this the period, he modernized the postal service and also announced the "3 cent Gold Star Mothers" stamp in recognition of the Sullivan brothers' and his mother.

Donaldson died at St. Luke's Hospital in Kansas City, Missouri, on March 25, 1970. He was buried at the Forest Hill Calvary Cemetery in Kansas City, Missouri.

Political offices
Preceded by Robert E. Hannegan	United States Postmaster General; Served under: Harry S. Truman; 1947 – 1953	Succeeded by Arthur E. Summerfield
