= Frank C. Walker =

American lawyer and politician (1886–1959)

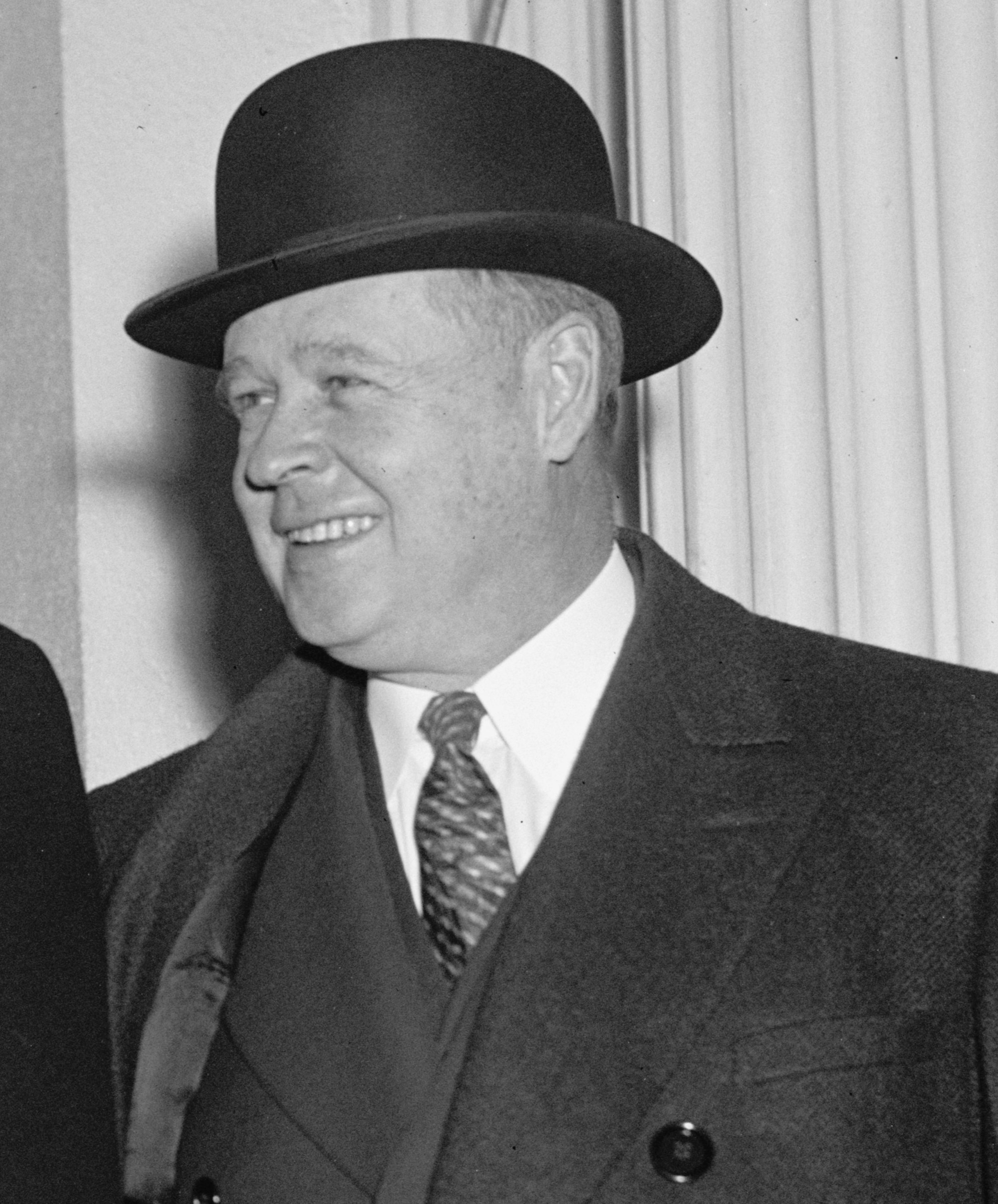
- Walker leaving the White House with DNC executives W. Forbes Morgan and James Farley after meeting with President Franklin D. Roosevelt (December 30, 1936)

Chair of the Democratic National Committee
- In office January 18, 1943 – January 23, 1944
- Preceded by: Edward J. Flynn
- Succeeded by: Robert E. Hannegan

51st United States Postmaster General
- In office September 10, 1940 – May 8, 1945
- President: Franklin D. Roosevelt; Harry S. Truman
- Preceded by: James Farley
- Succeeded by: Robert E. Hannegan

Executive Director of the National Emergency Council
- In office 1933–1935
- Appointed by: Franklin D. Roosevelt
- Preceded by: position established
- Succeeded by: Donald R. Richberg

Treasurer of the Democratic National Committee
- In office July 31, 1932 – January 17, 1934
- Preceded by: James W. Gerard
- Succeeded by: Walter J. Cummings

Member of the Montana House of Representatives from Silver Bow County
- In office January 6, 1913 – January 4, 1915
- Preceded by: multi-member district
- Succeeded by: multi-member district

Personal details
- Born: Frank Comerford Walker; May 30, 1886 Plymouth, Pennsylvania, U.S.
- Died: September 13, 1959 (aged 73) New York City, U.S.
- Party: Democratic
- Spouse: Hallie Boucher
- Children: 2
- Relatives: Thomas Joseph Walker (brother)
- Education: Gonzaga University (BA); University of Notre Dame (LLB)

Military service
- Branch/service: United States Army
- Rank: First Lieutenant
- Battles/wars: World War I

Frank Comerford Walker (May 30, 1886 – September 13, 1959) was an American lawyer and politician. He was the United States Postmaster General from 1940 until 1945, and the chairman of the Democratic National Committee from 1943 until 1944.

== Biography ==
Frank Walker was born in Plymouth, Pennsylvania, the son of David Walker (1848–1902), a grocer, and his wife, Ellen Comerford (1851–1916). His father moved his family to Montana about 1890, where he became the foreman of the Butte City Copper Mine. He died in 1902 of tuberculosis.

Frank Walker attended Gonzaga University in Spokane, Washington for three years and earned a law degree from Notre Dame in 1909. He then joined his older brother Thomas in a law practice in Butte, Montana. In 1913, he was elected to a term as a Montana state representative.

During World War I, Walker volunteered for the U.S. Army. He became a first lieutenant and saw action on the Western Front. After the war, he returned to his law practice.

He married Hallie Victoria Boucher (1892–1969) at Butte on November 11, 1914. They had two children, Thomas and Laura.

In 1925, he moved to New York City to become manager and general counsel of Comerford Theatres, a chain of movie theaters owned by his uncle Michael E. Comerford. For a time he was the pro-bono legal advisor to the Motion Picture Theater Owners of America, a trade organization.

In New York, Walker expanded his political activities, and became an early supporter of Franklin D. Roosevelt. In 1931, he co-founded the Roosevelt for President Society, and from 1932 to 1934, served as Treasurer of the Democratic National Committee (DNC). Until Roosevelt's death, Walker was one of his closest advisers.

When Roosevelt became President in 1933, he appointed Walker executive secretary of the National Emergency Council, a New Deal agency related to the NRA.

In 1940, Walker became Postmaster General (succeeding James Farley, who had also been DNC Chairman and Roosevelt's campaign manager). As Postmaster General, Walker continued his role as political adviser, often taking part in matters far removed from the Post Office. For example, during the negotiations which preceded the December 1941 attack on Pearl Harbor, he was in regular contact with Japanese Ambassador Nomura.

In 1943, Walker became Chairman of the DNC, serving until 1944, when he stepped down and was succeeded by Robert Hannegan. In May 1945, Walker announced his retirement as Postmaster General, to allow President Harry Truman to appoint his own candidate to the office. Truman selected Hannegan to succeed Walker in this office too, effective July 1.

Later in 1945, Truman appointed Walker as a member of the first U.S. delegation to the United Nations.

He died in New York City on September 13, 1959, at the age of 73 and was buried in St. Patrick's Cemetery, Butte, Montana.

Political offices
Preceded by James Farley	United States Postmaster General; 1940–1945	Succeeded by Robert E. Hannegan
Party political offices
Preceded by Edward J. Flynn	Chair of the Democratic National Committee; 1943–1944	Succeeded by Robert E. Hannegan
