= Winton M. Blount =

American industrialist and postmaster general (1921–2002)

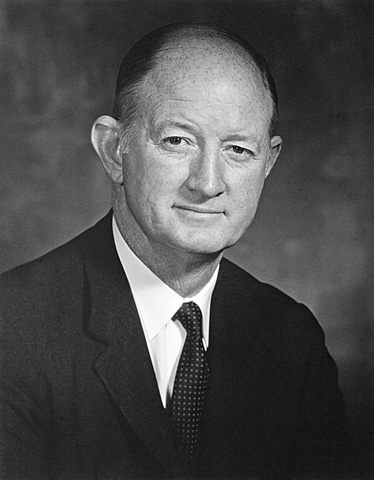

62nd United States Postmaster General
- In office January 22, 1969 – January 1, 1972
- President: Richard Nixon
- Preceded by: W. Marvin Watson
- Succeeded by: E. T. Klassen

Personal details
- Born: Winton Malcolm Blount; February 1, 1921 Union Springs, Alabama, U.S.
- Died: October 24, 2002 (aged 81) Highlands, North Carolina, U.S.
- Party: Republican

Military service
- Allegiance: United States
- Branch/service: United States Army
- Unit: United States Army Air Forces
- Battles/wars: World War II

Winton Malcolm Blount, known as Red Blount (February 1, 1921 – October 24, 2002), was an American philanthropist and politician who served as the United States Postmaster General from January 22, 1969, to January 1, 1972. He founded and served as the chief executive officer of the large construction company, Blount International, based in Montgomery, Alabama.

Blount was the last postmaster general when the position was within the presidential Cabinet.

== Background ==
Born in Union Springs, Alabama, Blount served in the United States Army Air Forces during World War II, having trained as a B-29 pilot. However, the war ended before his training was completed. Blount's first name was spelled with a "y" on his birth certificate, but he used Winton as an adult in his business dealings to avoid having to explain the unusual spelling.

In 1946, Blount and his brother William Houston Blount started a building contractor company, Blount Brothers. The company worked on such construction projects as the First Avenue Viaduct in Birmingham, the Louisiana Superdome in New Orleans, and Cape Canaveral's Complex 39A which launched Apollo 11 in Florida.

In 1952, Blount was appointed the Alabama Chairman of Citizens for Eisenhower, then in 1960 Southeastern Campaign Chairman for Richard M. Nixon's unsuccessful presidential campaign against John F. Kennedy. In 1961, Blount was elected President of the Alabama Chamber of Commerce; in 1968, President of the United States Chamber of Commerce.

In 1964, Blount was appointed by U.S. President Lyndon B. Johnson to the National Citizens Committee for Community Relations to advise the White House on the enforcement of the new Civil Rights Act of 1964 even though Blount had expressed doubts about the new law.

In 1969, Blount was appointed as the Postmaster General by U.S. President Richard Nixon, and he supervised the transition in 1971 of the U.S. Post Office Department from a Cabinet-level department of the U.S. government to a special independent executive agency. He was thus the last Cabinet-level Postmaster General, and he served as the first director of the new U.S. Postal Service. Blount's assistant Postmaster General was James M. Henderson.

In 1971, Blount's profile was depicted alongside that of Benjamin Franklin's on the face of a silver proof coin commemorating the inauguration of the new Postal Service. The commemorative coin was offered in a carrier with one stamp bearing a Philadelphia postmark from the old Post Office, and another from Washington D.C., placed by the new Postal Service.

== U.S. Senate campaign, 1972 ==
Blount faced in the general election the long-term incumbent Democrat, John Sparkman, who had been the 1952 Democratic candidate for vice president against Richard M. Nixon. From May 1972 to November 1972, George W. Bush transferred from the Texas Air National Guard to serve as the political director in Blount's campaign.

The final results were Sparkman 654,491 (65.3 percent) to Blount's 347,523 (34.7 percent). Blount carried only traditionally Republican Winston and Houston counties and lost his home county of Montgomery.

== Later years ==
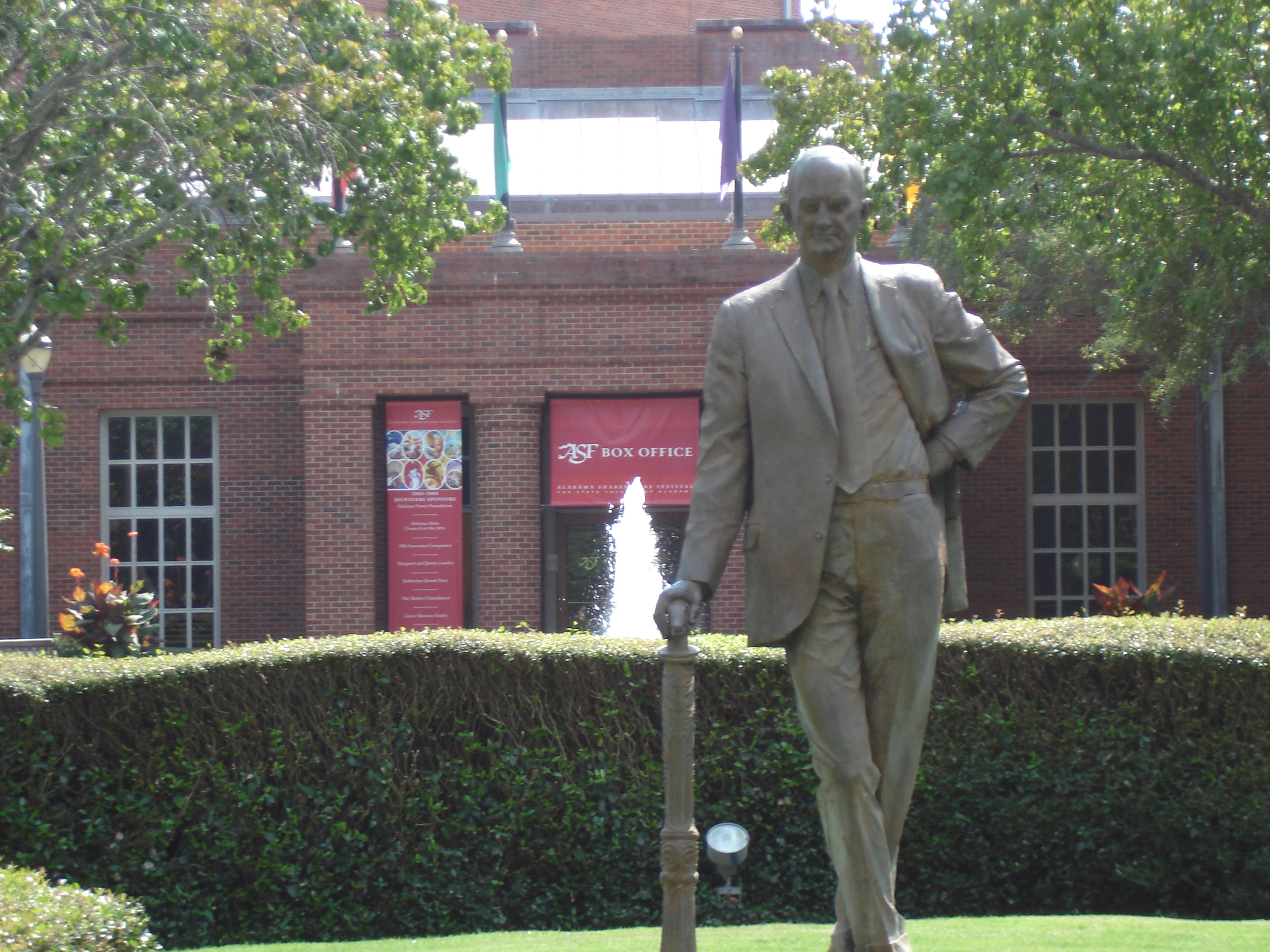
Winton Blount statue in Montgomery, Alabama

In 1973, Blount returned to Blount International, Inc., becoming its president once again in 1974. From 1981 to 1984 Blount, Inc., built the King Saud University in Riyadh, Saudi Arabia.

In 1980, Blount served as national chairman of John Connally's unsuccessful primary campaign, with the nomination being won by Ronald W. Reagan of California.

In 1996, the Greenwich Publishing Group published his autobiography called Doing It My Way, which he had co-written with Richard Blodgett.

In 1999, Blount International, Inc., was sold to Lehman Brothers company for $1.35 billion.

== Personal life ==
Blount was married twice. Blount first married Mary Katherine Archibald in 1942 and later divorced her in 1981. He had 5 children with Mary Katherine. Blount later married Carolyn Self in 1981. Blount died in Highlands, North Carolina, at the age of eighty-one. He was buried at Greenwood Cemetery in Montgomery, Alabama.

== Legacy ==
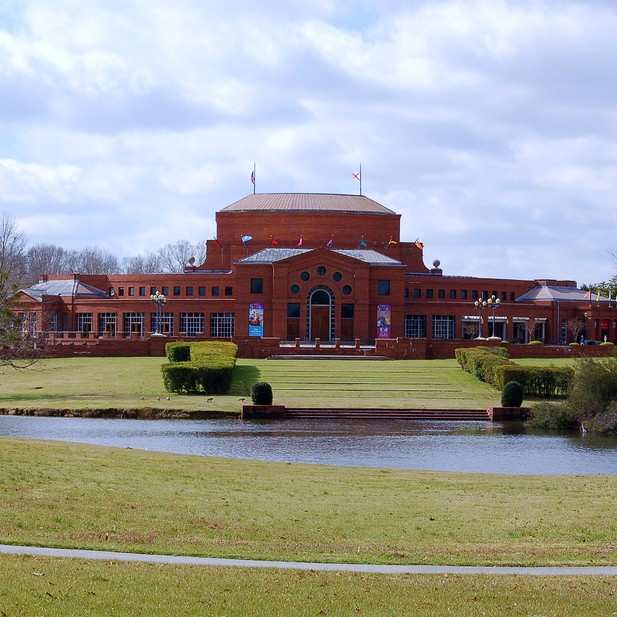
Carolyn Blount Theatre

Blount and his wife Carolyn, were philanthropists and notable patrons of the arts. Together they founded the Blount Cultural Park in Montgomery, which is home to the Montgomery Museum of Fine Arts and the Alabama Shakespeare Festival. The Blounts donated the land and a 100,000 square foot theater as the new home of the Alabama Shakespeare Festival in 1985. The cost was $21.5 million and at the time was the largest private donation to an American theater.

In 1980, Blount received the Golden Plate Award of the American Academy of Achievement.

The Winton M. Blount Elementary School in Montgomery County, completed in 2003, is named in his honor. Located on the city's rapidly growing east side, it is one of the largest elementary schools in the region.

The Blount Scholars Program (originally The Blount Undergraduate Initiative), a liberal arts honors program, was started at the University of Alabama in 1999 after Blount donated several million dollars. Blount Scholars reside in the Blount Living Learning Center on campus.

The Winton M. Blount Center for Postal Studies and the Winton M. Blount Research Chair, both at the Smithsonian National Postal Museum, were founded with an endowment from the Blount estate.

Political offices
Preceded by W. Marvin Watson	United States Postmaster General; 1969–1972	Succeeded by E. T. Klassen
Party political offices
Preceded by John Grenier	Republican nominee for U.S. Senator from Alabama (Class 2); 1972	Vacant Title next held by Albert L. Smith Jr.
