= Paul N. Carlin =

American politician and businessman (1931–2018)

Paul Carlin

66th United States Postmaster General
- In office January 1, 1985 – January 7, 1986
- President: Ronald Reagan
- Preceded by: William F. Bolger
- Succeeded by: Albert Vincent Casey

Personal details
- Born: August 25, 1931 San Diego, California, U.S.
- Died: April 25, 2018 (aged 86) Arlington, Virginia, U.S.
- Party: Republican
- Education: University of Wyoming (BA)

Military service
- Branch/service: United States Army
- Rank: First lieutenant

Paul Nestor Carlin (August 25, 1931 – April 25, 2018) was an American businessman and former United States Postal Service official. He served as the United States Postmaster General from January 1, 1985 to January 7, 1986.

== Education ==
Carlin was born in San Diego, California on August 25, 1931. Carlin received a bachelor's degree from the University of Wyoming in 1954, where he was an all-star track athlete. Carlin was an All-American runner for the Wyoming Cowboys track and field team, finishing 3rd in the 880 yards at the 1953 NCAA track and field championships. He served in the United States Army for two years and taught athletics at the University of Baghdad in Iraq as a Fulbright professor.

== Career ==
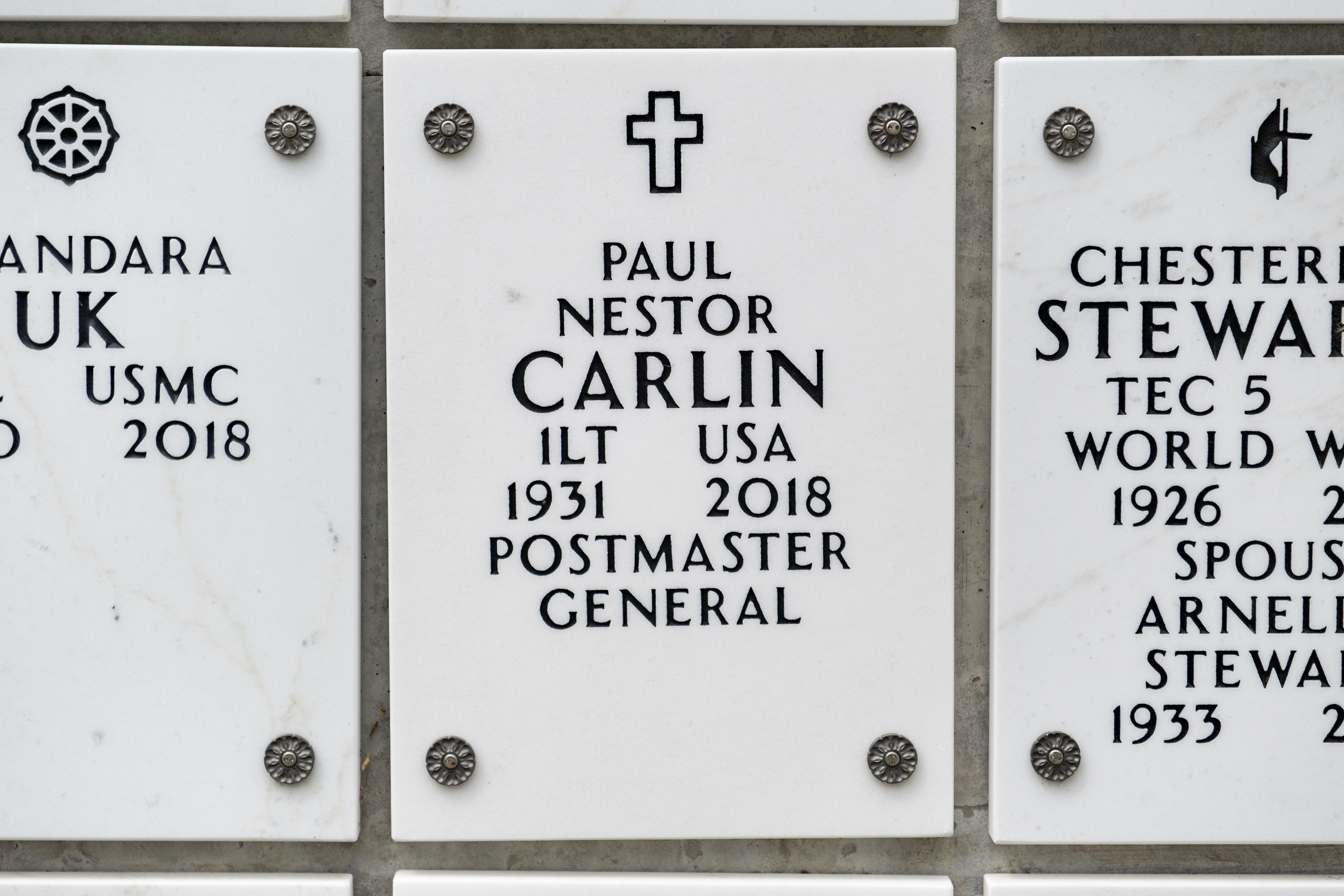
Grave at Arlington National Cemetery

During the 1960s, he was employed by the National Association of Counties where he served as assistant director of federal affairs, a position in which he lobbied Congress. He later held a similar position, director of federal and congressional relations, with the National School Boards Association, until 1968. He then joined the National Audio-Visual Association as vice president and educational director.

Carlin went into government as President Richard Nixon's liaison with Congress on postal matters. He went on to become a specialist in labor and employee relations at United States Postal Service headquarters, chief of the eastern postal region, and chief of the central postal region.

On November 14, 1984, the board of governors of the Postal Service selected Carlin from among 35 candidates to become the Postmaster General effective on January 1, 1985.

The Postal Service faced a deficit during Carlin's first fiscal year in office. Between October 1, 1984 (the start of the fiscal year) and July 1, 1985, the Postal Service had a $385 million deficit, due in part to an unanticipated increase in mail volume and changes in airline routes and schedules which required the Postal Service to renegotiate contracts with airlines and reschedule operations. In order to reduce the deficit, Carlin imposed a 3.5% pay cut on 35 top postal executives (including himself), and delayed a scheduled 3.2% pay increase for 714 other managers. Other cost-cutting measures taken by the Postal Service during his administration included cutting back on overtime hours worked and delaying or canceling the issuance of certain stamps. The Postal Service's deficit for the fiscal year as a whole came to $251.5 million.

Carlin's service as Postmaster General was cut short after just over a year when the board of governors fired him on January 6, 1986. He was allowed to remain as an adviser to the board of governors at a reduced salary. John McKean, chairman of the board of governors, explained Carlin's firing by saying, "The governors felt there was a changing environment that required a different marketplace perspective." Carlin's replacement, Albert V. Casey, related in his memoir the explanations McKean and vice-chairman Peter Voss gave him as to why Carlin was being fired. According to Casey, McKean and Voss told him that Carlin had failed to reduce the number of postal employees, that he had been slow to make decisions about purchasing equipment for automation, that he delegated too much authority, and was too subservient to the White House, in addition to running the $251 million deficit for the fiscal year.

In June 1986, Carlin filed suit against the board of governors to get his job as Postmaster General back. Carlin claimed that he had been fired for refusing to steer a contract for sorting equipment to a company favored by Voss, the vice-chairman of the board. (About a month before Carlin filed suit, Voss had pleaded guilty to taking illegal payoffs in relation to the contract and resigned from the board.) However, Carlin's lawsuit was dismissed on the grounds that the Postal Reorganization Act did not allow judicial review of the board's decision to fire a Postmaster General. According to the district court, Congress had granted the board authority to fire a Postmaster General "for a good reason, bad reason or no reason at all."

== Business ==
After leaving the Postal Service, Carlin co-founded (with Eugene C. Johnson) a company called Business Mail Express Inc. in 1990 and sold it in 1995. In 1998, he and Johnson established a company called Mail2000, which was intended to speed mail delivery by helping businesses presort mass mailings. In 2001, United Parcel Service purchased Mail2000 for an estimated $100 million. He died on April 25, 2018, in Arlington, Virginia, from pneumonia and bronchitis at the age of 86.

Government offices
Preceded by William F. Bolger	United States Postmaster General; January 1, 1985 – January 7, 1986	Succeeded by Albert V. Casey
