= Doug Tulino =

Acting United States Postmaster General in 2025

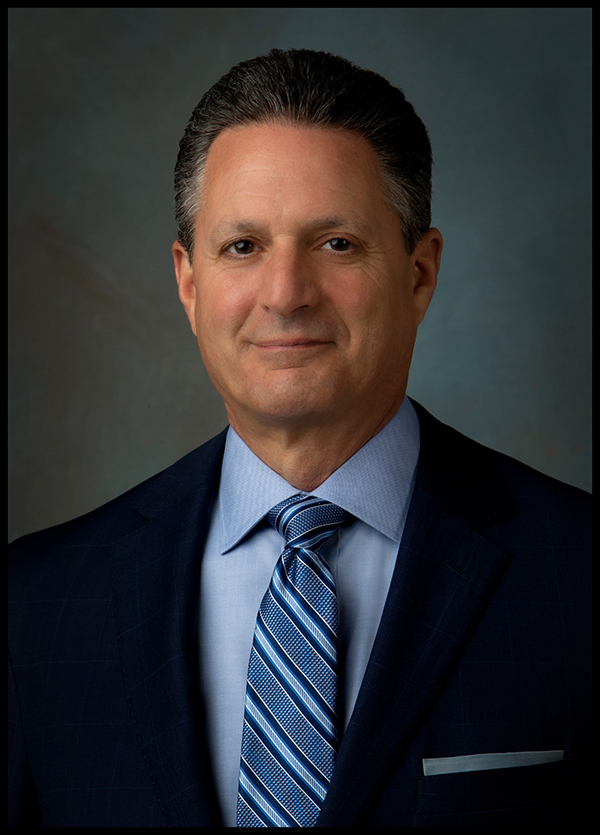
- Official portrait, 2025

United States Postmaster General
- Acting
- In office March 25, 2025 – July 14, 2025
- President: Donald Trump
- Preceded by: Louis DeJoy
- Succeeded by: David P. Steiner

Personal details
- Born: Douglas Tulino
- Education: Kent State University (BBA)

Douglas Tulino is an American government official who served as acting United States Postmaster General from March 24, 2025, through July 14, 2025. He is a member of the Board of Governors, has served as Deputy Postmaster General since May 2021, and chief human resources officer since November 2020.

== Education ==
Tulino graduated from Kent State University with a bachelor's degree in business administration.

== Career ==
In 1980, Tulino began his career with the United States Postal Service as a management associate in Chicago, Illinois. In 2005, Tulino became a labor relations vice president with the United States Postal Service. He was responsible for collective bargaining, contract negotiations, and arbitration administration. In November 2020, he became chief human resources officer, and in May 2021, he was appointed Deputy Postmaster General by Postmaster General Louis DeJoy. In early 2025, a fake letter claiming to be from Tulino was shared online, claiming that the USPS was likely to reject a tentative agreement. The USPS and the National Association of Letter Carriers confirmed that the letter was false.

=== Acting Postmaster General ===
On March 24, 2025, upon the resignation of DeJoy, Tulino was appointed acting Postmaster General.

He gave a keynote address at the National Postal Forum in April 2025.

Government offices
Preceded by Louis DeJoy	United States Postmaster General; 2025	Succeeded by David P. Steiner
