= Alvin McCoy =

American journalist

Alvin Scott McCoy (July 14, 1903 – March 12, 1988) was an American journalist of The Kansas City Star who won the Pulitzer Prize in 1954 for a series of articles published the previous year that drove C. Wesley Roberts to resign as chairman of the Republican National Committee.

== Biography ==
Alvin Scott McCoy was born on July 14, 1903, in Cheney, Kansas. He received an A.B. degree in 1925 from the University of Kansas at Lawrence, majoring in chemistry.

After spending two years at Ford Motor Company in Dodge City, Kansas, and one year traveling around the world in 1928 and 1929, McCoy was first employed in newspaper work as a reporter of the Evening Eagle in Wichita, Kansas.

He spent eighteen months on this newspaper and on the Wichita Morning Eagle.

In November, 1930, he joined the Kansas City Star as a reporter and worked on general assignments.

Years later, McCoy served as the Star's Pacific War correspondent in 1945. That same year he began covering Kansas state politics, legislature, news and features. He also did some editorial writing as well as scientific stories.

C. Wesley Roberts was accused of collecting a $10,000 commission on the sale of a hospital to the State of Kansas which the state already owned.

== Distinctions ==
- President of William Allen White Foundation at the School of Journalism at University of Kansas
- Member of the Kansas University Endowment association
- Member of the research committee of the Kansas Association of School Boards

== Bibliography ==
- The Pulitzer Prize Archive: A History and Anthology of Award Winning Materials in Journalism, Letters and Arts, Volume 6, Editor Heinz-Dietrich Fischer, Publisher Walter de Gruyter, ISBN 3598301707, 9783598301704, 420 pages.
