= Howard Putnam =

American businessman (born 1937)

Howard D. Putnam (born August 21, 1937) is an American businessman. He was CEO of Southwest Airlines for three years, and later CEO of Braniff International Airways at the time of its bankruptcy.

== Career ==
When Putnam was 23 years old, he was a sales representative for Capital Airlines. He joined United Airlines when Capital was acquired by United in 1961. 17 years on, he became Group Vice President, Marketing at United Airlines before leaving to head Southwest Airlines.

From August 1978 to 1981, Putnam was President and CEO of Southwest Airlines. He left Southwest in September 1981 to head ailing Braniff.

In 1982, he had a conversation with American Airlines CEO Robert Crandall, in which he was told by Crandall that if Braniff raised their prices, American would too. Putnam declined, but the U.S. Federal Government later brought an antitrust action against Crandall and American based on a recording of the conversation. Putnam was president of Braniff when it ceased operation in bankruptcy on May 12, 1982.

He is currently a motivational speaker and author of The Winds of Turbulence: A Ceo's Reflections on Surviving and Thriving on the Cutting Edge of Corporate Crisis. He also produced a DVD:Pass It On, Share The W.I.S.H., which was scheduled for release on April 1, 2007.
