= Guy Gabrielson =

American politician

Chair of the Republican National Committee
- In office August 5, 1949 – July 12, 1952
- Preceded by: Hugh Scott
- Succeeded by: Arthur Summerfield

Personal details
- Born: Guy George Gabrielson; May 22, 1891 Sioux Rapids, Iowa, U.S.
- Died: May 1, 1976 (aged 84) Point Pleasant, New Jersey, U.S.
- Party: Republican
- Education: University of Iowa; Harvard Law School

Guy George Gabrielson (May 22, 1891 – May 1, 1976) was a Republican politician from New Jersey. He served as chairman of the Republican National Committee from 1949 to 1952, and was a member of the New Jersey General Assembly from 1925 to 1929, and was its Speaker in 1929.

An attorney who later became a corporate executive, after leaving elective politics, Gabrielson turned to Republican politics. He rose through the ranks of Republican activists. He became a member of the Republican National Committee in 1944 and its chairman in 1948, leaving both posts in 1952.

Gabrielson was controversial at the 1952 Republican National Convention because of his support for presidential hopeful Ohio Senator Robert A. Taft, but was greeted with cheers when he opened the Convention.

After dissolving his law firm in 1959, Gabrielson served as a corporate executive, retaining several posts in the years before his 1976 death.

== Early life and career ==
Gabrielson was born May 22, 1891, in Sioux Rapids, Iowa, the son of Frank A. Gabrielson and Ida (Janson) Gabrielson. In 1918, Gabrielson had married Cora Speer.

A lawyer in private life, he was also politically active in New Jersey, serving in the state's General Assembly from 1925 to 1929, and as Speaker during the 1929 session. Gabrielson lost his seat as the Depression triggered an increasing Democratic wave.

== Republican politics ==
With few prospects in elective politics, he turned to Republican politics and became Republican National Committeeman from New Jersey in 1948. He was then elected Chairman of the RNC in 1949.

In a 1950 article in The New York Times in the wake of McCarthyism, he said homosexuals working for the American government were "perhaps as dangerous as the actual Communists".

In 1951, Gabrielson became embroiled in a loan scandal, and freshman Senator Richard Nixon (R-Calif.) called for his ouster, as well as that of Democratic National Committee chairman William M. Boyle, a close ally of President Harry S. Truman, who had a similar loan involvement. Nixon feared Gabrielson would favor California's senior senator, William F. Knowland for any national office, and desired his ouster to clear his own path to higher office. Boyle resigned, Gabrielson, whose offense was much more that of appearance, did not resign. Because of the enmity between Gabrielson and Nixon, the senator's name was never entered for formal consideration as a keynote speaker at the convention. Gabrielson would also be one of the few Republican politicians not to offer him support after Nixon, by then the Republican Vice-presidential candidate, placed his fate in the hands of the RNC in the Checkers speech, saying that Nixon's speech (which he had not heard) did not "make sense" because it would take ten days to assemble the RNC.

Gabrielson supported Taft at the 1952 convention, and the Eisenhower forces were afraid he would tilt the close convention for the Ohio senator. However, when the chairman came forward to open the convention, both sides burst into a round of applause for Gabrielson.

== Later life ==
The 1952 convention ended Gabrielson's time as RNC chairman, and he stepped down in favor of Arthur Summerfield. He left his position as committeeman from New Jersey at the end of 1952.

In 1959, Gabrielson retired from his legal practice, dissolving his firm. In his retirement, he worked for several corporations or served on their boards. He had lived from 1940 to 1975 in Bernardsville, New Jersey; he then moved to the seaside community of Mantoloking.

He died in Point Pleasant, New Jersey, on May 1, 1976, having outlived Cora Gabrielson by three years, and was survived by a son and daughter.

== General Reference ==
- Guy George Gabrielson Papers, 1925-1967. M.E. Grenander Department of Special Collections and Archives, University Libraries, University at Albany, State University of New York (hereafter referred to as the Gabrielson Papers).

== Bibliography ==
- Gellman, Irwin (1999), The Contender, The Free Press, ISBN 1-4165-7255-4
- Morris, Roger (1990), Richard Milhous Nixon: The Rise of an American Politician, Henry Holt and Company, ISBN 0-8050-1834-4

Party political offices
Preceded by Hugh Scott	Chair of the Republican National Committee; 1949–1952	Succeeded by Arthur Summerfield
