= Benjamin F. Bailar =

American businessman (1934–2017)

Benjamin Bailar

64th United States Postmaster General
- In office February 16, 1975 – March 15, 1978
- President: Gerald Ford; Jimmy Carter
- Preceded by: E. T. Klassen
- Succeeded by: William F. Bolger

Personal details
- Born: April 21, 1934 Champaign, Illinois, U.S.
- Died: February 20, 2017 (aged 82) Lake Forest, Illinois, U.S.
- Education: University of Colorado Boulder (BA); Harvard University (MBA)

Military service
- Branch/service: United States Navy
- Years of service: 1955-1957
- Rank: Lieutenant

Benjamin Franklin Bailar (April 21, 1934 – February 20, 2017) was an American businessman who served as the United States Postmaster General from February 16, 1975, to March 15, 1978. He took office on February 16, 1975, succeeding Elmer T. Klassen. Previously, he had served as senior assistant postmaster general, chief financial officer, and deputy postmaster general.

== Early life and education ==
Bailar was born in Champaign, Illinois, on April 21, 1934. After attending public schools and the University of Illinois Lab School in his home town, Bailar attended the University of Colorado. Following his graduation in 1955, he served in the United States Navy as a Supply Officer before entering the Harvard Business School. He received his Masters in Business Administration in 1959. Bailar is also the recipient of honorary degrees from Monmouth College and the University of Colorado.

== Career ==
Bailar, a graduate of the Harvard Business School with an extensive background in finance and management, attempted to place the postal service on a strong economic footing. His major responsibility as United States Postmaster General was to ensure that the semi-independent government corporation could support itself on revenues from mail users. Bailar was especially concerned with the quality of mail service and postal costs. One significant cost was labor, and Bailar is probably best known for negotiating a last moment contract which avoided a strike by unionized postal employees in 1975. He was also instrumental in the rate increase of first class stamps to 13 cents, in dealing with CIA mail tampering, and in addressing possible postal cost-cutting which would have resulted in a decline in mail services to some rural areas.

In addition to his term of service as postmaster general, Bailar has worked for the Continental Oil Company, American Can Company, and U.S. Gypsum. He has served on the boards of a number of corporations, banks, educational institutions, and not-for-profit organizations. In 1987, he accepted appointment as dean and professor of the Jesse H. Jones School of Business Administration at Rice University in Houston, Texas. Bailar led the fledgling program through 10 years of steady growth and increasing recognition before retiring in 1997.

== Service on advisory committee ==
Bailar was appointed to the USPS' Citizens' Stamp Advisory Committee in December 2006 by former postmaster general John E. “Jack” Potter. In July 2014, Bailar resigned from the committee in protest over the increasingly commercial choices for stamp designs.

Government offices
Preceded by E. T. Klassen	United States Postmaster General; February 16, 1975 – March 15, 1978	Succeeded by William F. Bolger
