= William F. Bolger =

American postmaster general

William Bolger
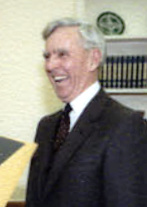

65th United States Postmaster General
- In office March 15, 1978 – January 1, 1985
- President: Jimmy Carter; Ronald Reagan
- Preceded by: Benjamin F. Bailar
- Succeeded by: Paul N. Carlin

Personal details
- Born: March 13, 1923 Waterbury, Connecticut, U.S.
- Died: August 21, 1989 (aged 66) Arlington County, Virginia, U.S.
- Education: George Washington University (BS)

William F. Bolger (March 13, 1923 – August 21, 1989) was the 65th Postmaster General of the United States from March 15, 1978 to January 1, 1985.

Bolger was born in Waterbury, Connecticut. He served in the United States Army Air Forces during World War II. He took courses in accounting at George Washington University. He was the second career postal employee to attain the rank of Postmaster General. After leaving the Postal Service, he served as president of the Air Transport Association of America. The Bolger Conference Center in Potomac, Maryland is named after Postmaster General Bolger. He died on August 22, 1989 in Arlington, Virginia at the age of 66. He was buried at Saint Mary Cemetery in Tewksbury, Massachusetts.

Government offices
Preceded by Benjamin F. Bailar	United States Postmaster General; March 15, 1978 – January 1, 1985	Succeeded by Paul N. Carlin
