= C. Wesley Roberts =

American political activist (1902–1976)

Chair of the Republican National Committee
- In office January 17, 1953 – March 27, 1953
- Preceded by: Arthur Summerfield
- Succeeded by: Leonard Hall

Personal details
- Born: Charles Wesley Roberts; December 14, 1902 Oskaloosa, Kansas, U.S.
- Died: April 9, 1976 (aged 73) Oskaloosa, Kansas, U.S.
- Party: Republican
- Spouse: Ruth Patrick
- Children: Pat (son)

Charles Wesley Roberts (December 14, 1902 – April 9, 1976) was a Kansas businessman who was Chairman of the Republican National Committee for four months in 1953 under Dwight D. Eisenhower.

C. Wesley Roberts (or Wes Roberts) was born in Oskaloosa, Kansas, where he died, the son of Daisy Marian (née Needham) and Francis Henry "Frank" Roberts. The Roberts family published the smalltown weekly Oskaloosa Independent for more than a century. Davis Publications currently owns The Oskaloosa Independent.

He was the father of U.S. Senator Pat Roberts.

Alvin Scott McCoy of The Kansas City Star won a Pulitzer Prize in 1954 for local reporting for a series of articles that drove Roberts to resign his RNC chairmanship. Roberts was accused of collecting a $10,000 commission on the sale of a hospital to the State of Kansas which the state already owned.

== Footnotes ==
Party political offices
| Preceded by Arthur Summerfield | Chair of the Republican National Committee; 1953 | Succeeded by Leonard Hall |
