= E. T. Klassen =

American Postmaster general (1908–1990)

Ted Klassen

63rd United States Postmaster General
- In office January 1, 1972 – February 16, 1975
- President: Richard Nixon; Gerald Ford
- Preceded by: Winton M. Blount
- Succeeded by: Benjamin F. Bailar

Personal details
- Born: November 6, 1908; Hillsboro, Kansas, U.S.
- Died: March 6, 1990 (aged 81); Palm Harbor, Florida, U.S.

Elmer Theodore "Ted" Klassen (November 6, 1908 – March 6, 1990) served as the United States Postmaster General from January 1, 1972, to February 16, 1975.

In 1971 Klassen became the first Postmaster General named by the Postal Service's Board of Governors, rather than the President, under new Federal legislation. He became the 60th Postmaster General on January 1, 1972, serving until February 16, 1975, when he retired and moved to Palm Harbor. From January 22, 1969, to December 31, 1971, he had been Deputy Postmaster General.

Klassen played a major role in shaping the Postal Reorganization Act of 1970, which took the Post Office Department from under the control of a Cabinet-level officer and made it an independent agency in the executive branch. He was instrumental in negotiating a contract between the United States Postal Service and the representatives of seven postal unions, with about 600,000 members, in July 1971.

At the time of his retirement, the Postal Service was under criticism by members of Congress and others because of financial and organizational problems and higher rates. Mr. Klassen came in for his share of the criticism, in particular from Jack Anderson, the syndicated newspaper columnist, who took issue over contracts awarded by the Postal Service.

Klassen was born in Hillsboro, Kansas, and was raised in California; he began his career at American Can in 1925 as a messenger in the San Francisco plant. On April 28, 1965, he became president of the company, which later became the Primerica Corporation. Klassen never attended college; his only formal education beyond high school was advanced management training at Harvard University in 1954. In 1968 Klassen unexpectedly resigned his in a dispute with the chairman of American Can.

Government offices
Preceded by Winton M. Blount	United States Postmaster General; 1972–1975	Succeeded by Benjamin F. Bailar
