= David P. Steiner =

American business executive and 76th United States Postmaster General (born 1960)

David Steiner

76th United States Postmaster General
- Incumbent
- Assumed office July 15, 2025
- President: Donald Trump
- Preceded by: Doug Tulino (acting)

Personal details
- Born: David Paul Steiner; May 4, 1960 (age 66) Oakland, California, U.S.
- Spouse: Judy Steiner
- Children: 3
- Education: Louisiana State University (BS); University of California, Los Angeles (JD)

David Paul Steiner (born May 4, 1960) is an American business executive and lawyer who has served as the 76th United States postmaster general since 2025.

== Early life and education (1960–1986) ==
David Paul Steiner was born on May 4, 1960, in Oakland, California. He graduated from Louisiana State University with a bachelor's degree in accounting in 1982, pledging Phi Delta Theta, and graduated from the UCLA School of Law in 1987.

== Career ==
=== Law career (1987–2000) ===
Steiner was admitted to the State Bar of California in December 1988. He worked as an associate at Jones, Walker, Waechter, Poitevent, Carrere & Denegre and Gibson, Dunn & Crutcher. In 1990, Steiner joined Phelps Dunbar. He specialized in corporate, securities, and mergers and acquisitions law. Steiner was named a partner in February 1995 and subsequently started the firm's pro-bono practice where Steiner said they "help people in need, and need people to help." Steiner married Judy and had three children with her.

=== Waste Management (2000–2016) ===
In November 2000, Steiner became deputy general counsel for Waste Management, rejecting a job offer from Enron. In July 2001, he was appointed general counsel and senior vice president, and in April 2003, Steiner was promoted to chief financial officer. He succeeded A. Maurice Myers as chief executive in March 2004. Steiner became president of Waste Management in June 2010. His tenure marked a shift in the company's marketing towards environmental services. Steiner led an offer to acquire Republic Services, the second largest waste disposal company in the United States, in 2008. Steiner resigned as president in July 2016 and as chief executive in November.

=== Board memberships ===
Steiner has served on the board of directors of FedEx since 2009 and as its lead independent director since 2013. He has additionally served on the board of TE Connectivity. Steiner joined the boards of Vulcan Materials Company in February 2017 and AMP Robotics in January 2025.

== Postmaster General (2025–present) ==
In response to Senator Gary Peters, Steiner says that if a state refuses to give the Trump administration their voter lists under Trump's Executive Order 14399, the Postal Service will not mail their ballots.

In March 2025, the board of governors of the United States Postal Service began searching for a successor to Louis DeJoy, the United States postmaster general who resigned in March after his five-year commitment as Postmaster General ended. In May, The Washington Post reported that the candidates had narrowed to Steiner, Jim Cochrane, and William Zollars. President Donald Trump dismissed Zollars and privately stated that he would favor Steiner. On May 9, the board of governors announced that Steiner would serve as postmaster general in July.

When first contacted, Steiner declined the position. He changed his mind during a visit to Normandy, where he said he felt a sense of civic duty.

== Works cited ==
=== Books ===
- Martindale-Hubbell Law Directory. New Jersey: Martindale-Hubbell. 1997. ISBN 9781561602223.

=== Articles ===
- Bogage, Jacob (May 6, 2025). "At Trump's urging, USPS board to name FedEx official as postmaster general". The Washington Post.
- "Business Deals". The Clarion-Ledger. February 12, 1995.
- "David Steiner". Phi Delta Theta.
- de la Merced, Michael (July 15, 2008). "Unsolicited, Waste Giant Seeks to Buy a Competitor". The New York Times.
- Deutsch, Claudia (February 7, 2008). "A Garbage Hauler Tidies Up Its Image". The New York Times.
- Higham, Aliss (May 9, 2025). "Donald Trump Launches Bid To Overhaul USPS". Newsweek.
- "David P. Steiner, Waste Management, Inc". Diversity Journal. March 23, 2011.
- "Ex-Waste Management CEO Steiner Joins Vulcan Materials Board". Waste360. February 14, 2017.
- "Financial Officer Rises to Chief at Waste Management". The New York Times. March 9, 2004.
- "Former WM CEO David Steiner Joins AMP's Board of Directors". Waste360. January 29, 2025.
- Fung, Esther (May 9, 2025). "Six Facts About David Steiner, the New U.S. Postmaster General". The Wall Street Journal.
- Jamerson, Joshua (November 11, 2016). "Waste Management Names James Fish CEO". The Wall Street Journal.
- LaPara, Cailley (May 7, 2025). "FedEx Director Steiner Is Leading Candidate to Run Post Office". Bloomberg News.
- LaRowe, Lynn (May 9, 2025). "Ex-Waste Management Exec Named Next Postmaster General". Law360.
- Long, Katherine (May 9, 2025). "FedEx board member David Steiner to lead US Postal Service". Politico.
- Moore, Rob (August 11, 2022). "Meet FedEx's proposed board of directors". Daily Memphian.
- Moore, Rob (August 11, 2022). "'Corporate agitator' questions FedEx board appointments". Daily Memphian.
- Murphy, Maxwell (July 28, 2016). "CFO Moves: Waste Management, Erie Indemnity". The Wall Street Journal.
- Ngo, Madeleine (May 9, 2025). "Postal Service Selects FedEx Board Member as Next Postmaster General". The New York Times.
- Tyko, Kelly (May 9, 2025). "USPS board chooses David Steiner as next postmaster general". Axios.
- "Waste Management's COO Is Leaving the Firm". Waste360. June 3, 2010.
- "Waste Management names new exec". Houston Business Journal. January 4, 2001.
- "Waste Management Promotes Officer". The New York Times. April 4, 2003.

=== Documents ===
- "Attorney Profile David Paul Steiner #139008" (Document). State Bar of California.
- "David P Steiner in the California Birth Index, 1905-1995" (Document). California Birth Index.
- "David P Steiner in the U.S., Index to Public Records, 1994-2019" (Document). Index to Public Records.

Government offices
Preceded by Doug Tulino; Acting	United States Postmaster General; 2025–present	Incumbent
