= Albert Vincent Casey =

American businessman

Albert Casey

67th United States Postmaster General
- In office January 7, 1986 – August 16, 1986
- President: Ronald Reagan
- Preceded by: Paul Carlin
- Succeeded by: Preston Tisch

Personal details
- Born: Albert Vincent Casey; February 28, 1920 Arlington, Massachusetts, U.S.
- Died: July 10, 2004 (aged 84) Dallas, Texas, U.S.
- Education: Harvard University (BA, MBA)

Albert Vincent Casey (February 28, 1920 – July 10, 2004) was a United States Postmaster General, publisher of Los Angeles Times, and an attendee of the Bohemian Grove. He received two degrees from Harvard University in 1948.

Casey was born in Arlington, Massachusetts. He served in the United States Army for four years during World War II. He served on the New York State Financial Control Board when it was first formed in 1975. He spent eight years as President of Times Mirror Company and was CEO of American Airlines from 1974 to 1985. He was a distinguished executive at the Woodrow Wilson International Center for Scholars. He died at his home in Dallas, Texas.

== Awards ==
Casey was awarded the H. Neil Mallon Award by the World Affairs Council in 1998, presented annually to individuals who have excelled at promoting the international focus of North Texas.

Business positions
Preceded by C. R. Smith	CEO of American Airlines; 1974–1985	Succeeded by Robert Crandall
Government offices
Preceded by Paul N. Carlin	United States Postmaster General; 1986–1986	Succeeded by Preston R. Tisch
