= Robert Crandall =

American businessman (born 1935)

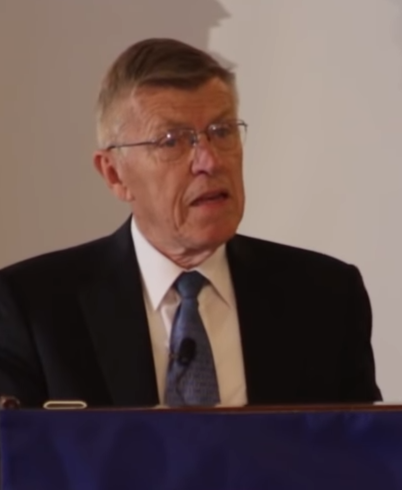
- Robert Crandall in 2015
- Born: December 6, 1935 (age 90); Westerly, Rhode Island, U.S.
- Education: University of Rhode Island; University of Pennsylvania
- Occupations: Former President and CEO of American Airlines (1985–1998)

Robert Lloyd Crandall (born December 6, 1935) is an American businessman who is the former president and chairman of American Airlines. Called an industry legend by airline industry observers, Crandall has been the subject of several books and is a member of the Hall of Honor of the Conrad Hilton college.

== Early life ==
The Great Depression forced Robert Crandall's father to leave Rhode Island to work selling life insurance, which resulted in multiple relocations. Crandall ended up attending 13 schools before his high school graduation. He graduated from the University of Rhode Island, and from the Wharton School of the University of Pennsylvania, with an MBA.

== Airline career ==
In 1966, he joined TWA, where he worked for six years. In 1972, he left to become a senior financial officer at Bloomingdale's Department Stores, but he returned to the airline industry in 1973, as senior financial vice president of American.

In 1982, he had a famous conversation with Braniff CEO Howard D. Putnam, in which he told Putnam that if Braniff raised their prices, American would too. Crandall has publicly expressed embarrassment over that conversation. That same year, Crandall became American's president. In 1985, Crandall succeeded Albert Casey as American's chairman and CEO.

During the latter period of Crandall's tenure as CEO, investor concern over airline bankruptcies and falling stock prices caused Crandall to remind his employees about the dangers of investing in airline stocks. Known for his candor, Crandall later told an interviewer, "I've never invested in any airline. I'm an airline manager. I don't invest in airlines. And I always said to the employees of American, 'This is not an appropriate investment. It's a great place to work and it's a great company that does important work. But airlines are not an investment.'" Crandall noted that since the airline deregulation of the 1970s, some 150 airlines had gone out of business. "A lot of people came into the airline business. Most of them promptly exited, minus their money," he said.

Crandall is credited with creating the first major mileage-reward frequent flyer program in the airline industry, the AAdvantage program, as well as pioneering modern reservations systems through the creation of Sabre. He is also credited with pioneering yield management. Crandall also serves as a senior adviser and sits on the board of AirCell, an in-flight telephony company which won the larger of two licenses for air-ground data service that provide in-flight broadband service.

A major labor confrontation during Crandall's tenure occurred in November 1993, when American's 21,000 flight attendants, represented by the Association of Professional Flight Attendants, struck over pay and work rules during the Thanksgiving travel period. With passenger service reduced to roughly one-third of the normal schedule, Crandall rejected a proposed presidential emergency board as "politically inspired mediation", continued training replacement workers, and said that approximately 4,000 flight-attendant positions would be eliminated. On the fifth day of the strike, after President Bill Clinton telephoned Crandall and union president Denise Hedges, both sides agreed to binding arbitration; American ended its replacement-training effort and withdrew the planned job reductions.

In 1998, he retired from American and he went on to work as director of many other companies, including Celestica, Haliburton, and Anixter.

=== Criticism of deregulation ===
Before the passing of the 1978 Airline Deregulation Act, Crandall was one of the act's loudest opponents. When asked to comment on deregulation in June 2008, Crandall stated:

The consequences of deregulation have been very adverse. Our airlines, once world leaders, are now laggards in every category, including fleet age, service quality and international reputation. Fewer and fewer flights are on time. Airport congestion has become a staple of late-night comedy shows. An even higher percentage of bags are lost or misplaced. Last-minute seats are harder and harder to find. Passenger complaints have skyrocketed. Airline service, by any standard, has become unacceptable.

In 2018, he stated:

At the time when we opposed [deregulation], when I opposed it, we took the view that it was likely to result in a relatively unsatisfactory transportation network, and I think that's happened... If you look at the number of cities that have lost commercial service, you'll see there's a whole lot of places in the country that used to be part of the network that aren't anymore. I think that has accelerated the movement of people towards the big cities and has discouraged the creation of medium-sized cities... I think that's adverse to the economy and adverse to the country.

=== Reputation for cost-cutting ===
While at American Airlines in the 1980s, Crandall was famed for his focus on cost-cutting. One story that has been frequently retold since is that he came up with the idea to remove one olive from every salad served to passengers. No one would notice and the airline would save $40,000 a year. Another story, which Crandall himself shared, involved cutting security at a Caribbean station warehouse to the point that the only guard left was a sound recording of a guard dog barking.

== Honors and awards ==
- Hall of Honor of the Conrad Hilton college.
- Horatio Alger award, 1997.
- Tony Jannus Award for outstanding leadership in the commercial aviation industry, 2001.
- L. Welch Pogue Award for Lifetime Achievement in Aviation, 2004.
- Wright Brothers Memorial Trophy from the National Aeronautic Association, 2006.

Business positions
Preceded by Albert Casey	American Airlines CEO; 1985–1998	Succeeded by Donald J. Carty
