= Arthur Summerfield =

American politician (1899–1972)

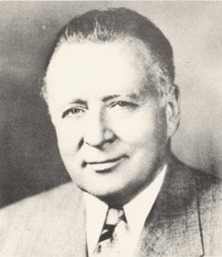

57th United States Postmaster General
- In office January 21, 1953 – January 20, 1961
- President: Dwight D. Eisenhower
- Preceded by: Jesse M. Donaldson
- Succeeded by: J. Edward Day

Chair of the Republican National Committee
- In office July 12, 1952 – January 17, 1953
- Preceded by: Guy Gabrielson
- Succeeded by: C. Wesley Roberts

Personal details
- Born: March 17, 1899 Pinconning, Michigan, U.S.
- Died: April 26, 1972 (aged 73) West Palm Beach, Florida, U.S.
- Party: Republican
- Spouse: Miriam Graim (m. 1918)
- Children: 2

Arthur Ellsworth Summerfield (March 17, 1899 – April 26, 1972) was a U.S. political figure who served as the 57th Postmaster General of the United States from 1953 to 1961. As Postmaster General, he was an ardent opponent of obscenity.

== Early life and career ==
Summerfield was born in Pinconning, Michigan, on March 17, 1899, the son of Cora Edith Ellsworth, (Born in Indiana on April 11, 1877 - Died in Flint, Michigan, on January 18, 1933) and William Henry Summerfield, (Born in Zilwaukee, Michigan, in 1876 - Died in Flint, Michigan, in 1938).

Before embarking on his political career, Summerfield had become well known in Michigan as the owner of one of the largest General Motors automobile dealerships in the state; and one of the largest in the Midwest. On July 22, 1918, Summerfield married the former Miriam Wealthy Graim, (Born in Alma, Michigan, on September 7, 1898 - Died in Flint, Michigan, on February 12, 1987). They had two children:

- Gertrude Miriam Summerfield MacArthur, (Born in Flint, Michigan, on November 26, 1920 - Died in Flint, Michigan, on July 17, 2008).
- Arthur Ellsworth Summerfield Jr.

== Political career ==
Summerfield served as Chairman of the Republican National Committee from 1952 to 1953. At the 1952 Republican National Convention he played a key role in winning the GOP presidential nomination for General Dwight Eisenhower. As Michigan's delegate chairman Summerfield convinced the large, uncommitted Michigan delegation to support Eisenhower, thus providing "Ike" with a major boost before the voting.

In December 1952, President-Elect Eisenhower chose Summerfield as the federal Postmaster General; he served in that post from 1953 until 1961. His assistant postmaster was former U.S. Representative Ben H. Guill of Texas.

As postmaster general, Summerfield oversaw attempts to reform and modernize the United States Postal Service (USPS) and the U.S. mail system, which was still conducting many sorting and processing operations by hand. Summerfield called for an increase in postage rates to subsidize the purchase of new mechanized mail processing and sorting equipment. Some of this equipment was adopted, including the Hamper-Dumper internal mail sorting/transport system and the Mail-Flo Letter Processing System, which used conveyors to speed mail processing. However, rapidly increasing mail volume and postal deficits prevented the Post Office from completely modernizing and mechanizing all of its many post offices. To improve the Post Office's image with the public, Summerfield began a promotional campaign designed to showcase Post Office achievements.

Summerfield was involved in the creation of the 1954 ABC television anthology program The Mail Story, a docudrama featuring stories about USPS. On July 4, 1955, in order to highlight its new image as a modern organization, the Post Office adopted a new red, white, and blue color scheme for all Post Office collection boxes, trucks, delivery vans, and equipment, as well as new technology and procedures for mail delivery. As part of that effort, Summerfield supported experiments with rocket-delivered mail, using the missile mail carrier. The first and only flight of the missile mail carrier occurred on June 8, 1959, when a letter-stuffed Regulus cruise missile was successfully launched from the U.S. Navy submarine USS Barbero.

=== Opposition against obscenity ===
As Postmaster General, Summerfield was a vigorous opponent of the mailing of obscene materials through the postal system. In 1955, postal inspectors seized a rare volume of the 2,400-year-old play Lysistrata by Aristophanes, which Summerfield described as "obscene, lewd and lascivious". When the first unexpurgated edition of Lady Chatterley's Lover was published in the US in 1959 by Grove Press, Summerfield moved to ban it from being sent by mail, saying that "any literary merit the book may have is far outweighed by the pornographic and smutty passages and words".

Under Summerfield, the post office targeted not only producers of obscene materials, but also recipients. Among the best known was Newton Arvin, an esteemed professor of English at Smith College, who was disgraced as a result of his prosecution for possessing "obscene photographs" in the form of physique magazines such as Grecian Guild Pictorial which contained homoerotic photographs of scantily dressed men. Arvin's story was made into an opera, The Scarlet Professor, which featured Summerfield as a character.

In January 1961, toward the end of his tenure as Postmaster General, Summerfield oversaw the indictment in Chicago of more than fifty members of the "Adonis Male Club", a gay pen pal service, for conspiracy to send obscene materials through the mail. The accused men had their information printed in local newspapers, and many lost their jobs and were disgraced in their community. One man committed suicide, and another attempted suicide. All defendants eventually pled guilty or were found guilty. A government spokesperson said that many more white-collar men would have been prosecuted, but were instead allowed to be sent for psychiatric treatment by their employers.

== Death and legacy ==
Summerfield died in West Palm Beach, Florida, on April 26, 1972, at the age of 73. Summerfield is interred in Sunset Hills Cemetery in Flint, Michigan.

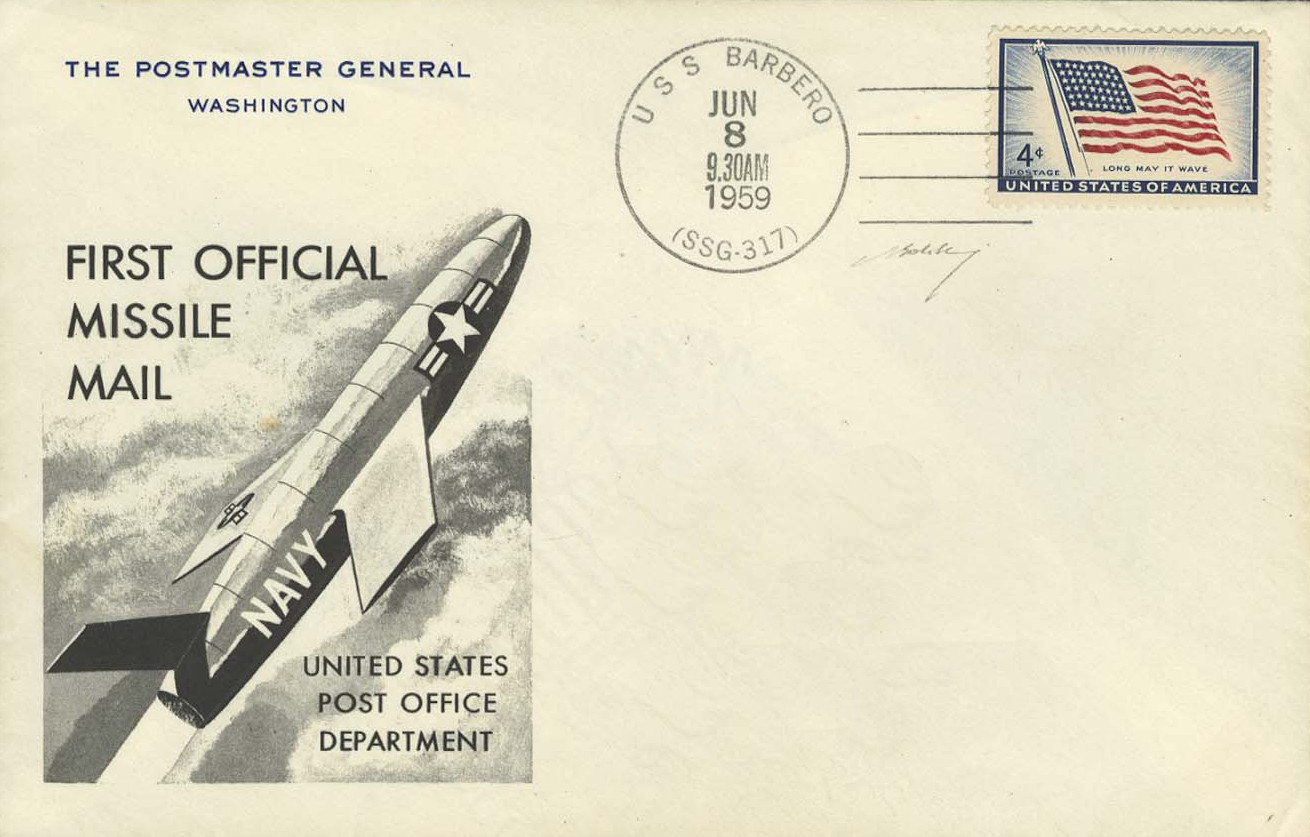
Missile Mail

Summerfield's book, U.S. Mail The Story of the United States Postal Service (By Summerfield as told to Charles Hurd) was published in 1960.

== Quote ==
Before man reaches the moon your mail will be delivered within hours from New York to California, to England, to India or to Australia by guided missiles.... We stand on the threshold of rocket mail.

Party political offices
| Preceded by Guy Gabrielson | Chair of the Republican National Committee; 1952–1953 | Succeeded by C. Wesley Roberts |
Political offices
| Preceded by Jesse M. Donaldson | United States Postmaster General; 1953–1961 | Succeeded by J. Edward Day |
