= Louis DeJoy =

American businessman, 75th United States Postmaster General

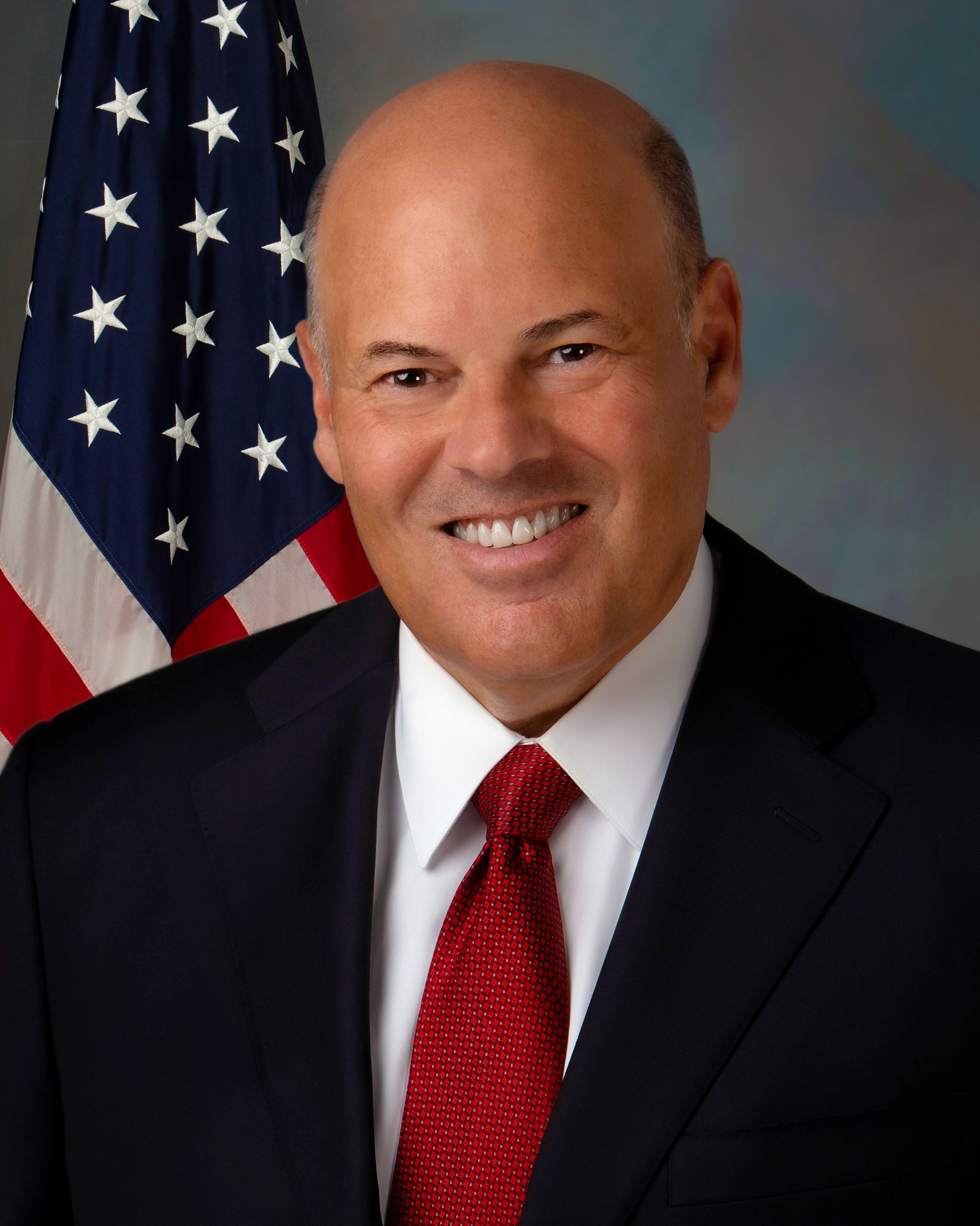

75th United States Postmaster General
- In office June 16, 2020 – March 24, 2025
- President: Donald Trump; Joe Biden; Donald Trump
- Preceded by: Megan Brennan
- Succeeded by: Doug Tulino (acting)

Personal details
- Born: June 20, 1957 (age 69) Brooklyn, New York, U.S.
- Party: Republican
- Spouse: Aldona Wos
- Children: 2
- Education: Stetson University (BBA)

Louis DeJoy (born June 20, 1957) is an American businessman who served as the 75th U.S. postmaster general. He was appointed in May 2020 by the Board of Governors of the United States Postal Service (USPS) and resigned on March 24, 2025. Before being appointed, he was the founder and CEO of the logistics and freight company New Breed Logistics and was a major Republican Party donor and fundraiser for Donald Trump. DeJoy was the first postmaster general since 1992 without any previous experience in USPS, and the first postmaster general in U.S. history to come directly from the board of a privately owned competitor to the public–private partnership of the USPS entity. His companies still hold active service contracts with the USPS, generating controversy over conflict of interest.

DeJoy was criticized for his cost-reduction policies enacted after assuming office in June 2020, which included eliminating overtime, and banning late or additional trips to deliver mail. The Postal Service also continued responding to long-term declines in first class mail volume with ongoing decommissioning of hundreds of high-speed mail-sorting machines and removal of the lower-volume mail collection boxes from streets. These practices were also criticized as mail delivery became delayed. The changes took place during the COVID-19 pandemic and in the lead-up to the 2020 presidential election, raising fears that the changes would interfere with voters who used mail-in voting to cast their ballots, possibly intentionally. Congressional committees and the USPS inspector general investigated. In August of that year, amid public pressure, DeJoy said that the changes would be suspended until after the election, and in October the USPS agreed to reverse all of them.

In March 2021, DeJoy issued a 10-year plan called "Delivering for America" to stabilize the finances of the Postal Service by slowing first class mail delivery, optimizing transportation networks, cutting post office hours, and raising prices. The plan assumed Congress would relieve the USPS of the requirement to pre-pay retiree health care costs, which with DeJoy's urging it did with the Postal Service Reform Act of 2022.

DeJoy attracted criticism and lawsuits from environmentalists and Democratic politicians when he decided to purchase 90% gasoline-powered delivery vehicles in 2022, which he justified in part by the agency's financial situation. After additional federal funding was provided by the Postal Service Reform Act of 2022 and Inflation Reduction Act, DeJoy revised these plans twice; the final version orders 83% electric vehicles through 2028 and 100% electric thereafter.

== Early life ==
DeJoy was born on June 20, 1957 in Brooklyn, New York City, and grew up in Islip, New York. He is the son of second-generation Italian immigrants to the United States. His father worked in trucking and was assaulted multiple times, prompting his son to seek a safer line of work. DeJoy earned a Bachelor of Business Administration in accounting from Stetson University in DeLand, Florida.

== Career ==
After graduating, DeJoy became a certified public accountant licensed to practice in the state of Florida.

=== New Breed Logistics ===
DeJoy was CEO of High Point, North Carolina-based New Breed Logistics from 1983 to 2014.

==== Dealing with USPS ====
New Breed was a United States Postal Service (USPS) contractor for over 25 years, providing shipping logistics support to USPS mail processing facilities; specifically, NBC News reported that the company was contracted to provide a pilot mail transport equipment service center in Greensboro, North Carolina. A 2001 audit by the USPS inspector general found that the USPS had given New Breed Logistics noncompetitive contracts of more than $300 million, starting in 1992. The audit concluded that the noncompetitive contracts cost taxpayers $53 million relative to competitively-bid contracts. The audit highlighted that the awarding of the noncompetitive contracts did not meet USPS requirements and that it potentially increased the USPS's costs and performance risks. Former Postal Service inspector general David Williams said that it was "puzzling" that the finding was not referred for investigation.

DeJoy responded that the review found no evidence of a failure to fulfill the terms and conditions of their contract, and the USPS also disputed some of the findings of the audit, saying that the high costs were instead due to the company operating in a high-labor-cost environment. A letter from Paul Vogel, the vice president of operations at the USPS in 2000, said that while they generally agreed with the findings, the noncompetitive contracts might have led to other unconsidered cost savings. A separate letter from other USPS officials to the inspector general on the same date also said that the New Breed contracts helped provide the basis for other noncompetitive contracts and that they were awarded in accordance with USPS guidelines.

In addition, two reports to Congress in 1999 stated that $9 million and $33 million, paid separately to New Breed, could have been "put to better use". The USPS inspector general at the time, Kelly Corcoran, retired in 2003 after a federal investigation into her abuse of authority, waste of public money and promotion of questionable personnel practices; her poor practices and subsequent removal hampered any further investigation.

==== Acquisition by XPO ====
The company was acquired by the Connecticut-based freight transporter XPO Logistics for a reported $615 million. Following that acquisition, he served as CEO of XPO's supply chain business in North America until his retirement the next year and was appointed to a strategic role on XPO Logistics' board of directors where he served until 2018.

=== LDJ Global Strategies ===
During his time as postmaster general, DeJoy was also president of LDJ Global Strategies, a Greensboro, North Carolina-based boutique firm with interests in real estate, private equity, consulting, and project management.

=== Republican Party fundraising ===
DeJoy has served as a major donor and fundraiser for a number of high-profile Republican Party politicians. He helped fund President George W. Bush's 2004 reelection campaign, co-chaired Rudy Giuliani's North Carolina fundraising campaign in 2008, and donated a combined $27,700 to Jeb Bush's 2016 presidential campaign. He donated $1.2 million each to Donald Trump's 2020 campaign, and to the Republican Party since 2016.

In April 2017, DeJoy was named one of three deputy finance chairmen of the Republican National Committee, along with Trump's then-lawyer Michael Cohen and the venture capitalist Elliott Broidy. In May 2019, DeJoy became local finance chairman for the 2020 Republican National Convention, then planned for Charlotte, North Carolina.

In September 2020, The Washington Post and The New York Times reported that according to former employees at DeJoy's logistics company New Breed, he participated in a straw donor scheme, reimbursing employees for making political donations. Employees, particularly managers, were expected to contribute to fundraisers for Republican candidates and organizations; they were allegedly reimbursed in full through the company's system of bonuses. Campaign finance records show that employees at New Breed gave substantial sums to Republican candidates and negligible amounts to Democrats. Between 2000 and 2014, when New Breed was sold, 124 employees gave a combined total over $1 million. Many of these people had not donated before they worked at the company and have not done so since leaving.

At an August congressional hearing DeJoy emphatically denied having engaged in such practices. The House Committee on Oversight and Reform opened an investigation into the allegations and the possibility that DeJoy lied to the committee, and called for the Postal Service to suspend him. North Carolina attorney general Josh Stein said that reimbursing someone for a political contribution would be a violation of the law and that "Any allegation that's this serious merits investigation." By the end of 2020, the Wake County, North Carolina district attorney's office had decided that it would not pursue a criminal investigation of New Breed's alleged campaign finance law violations. The office formally announced this decision in April of the following year. In December 2021, the Federal Election Commission voted 4–1 to dismiss two criminal complaints against DeJoy related to the straw donor allegations, citing approximately 20 New Breed employees who denied being pressured to make campaign contributions. CNN reported in June 2021 that the FBI was investigating the matter. That investigation was eventually closed, with no charges being filed as of 2023.

=== Postmaster general ===
==== Selection and conflict of interest controversy ====
On May 6, 2020, the bipartisan USPS Board of Governors, all selected by Trump and confirmed by the Senate, announced DeJoy's appointment as postmaster general and CEO, despite concerns about conflicts of interest. That day, the National Association of Letter Carriers president Frederic Rolando congratulated him on his appointment but warned of politicization of the USPS, writing: "Keeping politics out of the Postal Service and maintaining its independence is central to its success." In the process to identify a new postmaster general, the USPS Board hired two search firms, neither of which included DeJoy in their final list of candidates. USPS Board chair Mike Duncan, who had also served as chairman of the Republican National Committee and had known DeJoy personally, was involved with DeJoy's recommendation for the role. DeJoy was the first postmaster general in two decades without prior experience in the United States Postal Service. Instead he had three decades of experience in the private delivery sector.

While he divested shares in UPS and Amazon before taking on his role, DeJoy drew scrutiny for not divesting from his $30–75 million equity stake in XPO, a subcontractor for USPS. Under his tenure as postmaster general, USPS has increased its business with XPO. Additionally, when DeJoy sold his Amazon shares, he purchased stock options in Amazon that represent between 20 and 100% of his prior holdings. USPS prioritizes Amazon package delivery. A subsequent investigation carried out by the US Postal Service's inspector general found that DeJoy "met all the applicable ethics requirements" related to his investments. As of August 2020, DeJoy and his wife had $30–70 million invested in companies related to the USPS according to a USA Today report.

==== 2020 United States Postal Service crisis ====
Upon assuming office on June 16, 2020, he began taking measures such as banning overtime and extra trips to deliver mail, to reduce costs. He did not communicate the reasons for such changes within the organization, and such measures also resulted in the slow down of the mail service. Congressional Democrats called for the measures to be rolled back. More than 600 high-speed mail sorting machines were scheduled to be dismantled and removed from postal facilities, raising concerns that mailed ballots for the November 3 election might not reach election offices on time. In the summer of 2020, removal of mail collection boxes became a controversial issue, as photos of their removal spread on social media. The USPS stated that repositioning mailboxes from low- to high-traffic areas was a longstanding practice dating back decades, and the practice of removing some boxes was influenced by an overall decrease in first-class mail volume, as was the decommissioning of mail-sorting machines. In August 2020, DeJoy announced that the Postal Service would halt the removal of mailboxes and decommissioning of mail-sorting equipment until after the November election.

On August 7, 2020, DeJoy announced he had reassigned or displaced 23 senior USPS officials, including the two top executives overseeing day-to-day operations. He said he was trying to breathe new life into a "broken business model". Rep. Gerald E. Connolly, who chairs the House committee that oversees the USPS, said the reorganization was "deliberate sabotage". In a letter to postal workers on August 13, 2020, DeJoy confirmed reports of delays in mail delivery, calling them "unintended consequences" of changes that eventually would improve service. At the same time that he was taking measures that postal workers and union officials said were slowing down mail delivery, President Trump told a TV interviewer that he himself was blocking funds for the postal service in order to hinder mail-in voting.

After congressional protests, the USPS inspector general began a review of DeJoy's policy changes. On August 18, 2020, DeJoy announced that the Postal Service would suspend cost-cutting and other operational changes until after the 2020 election. He said that equipment that had already been removed would not be restored. Documents obtained by Citizens for Responsibility and Ethics in Washington indicated that DeJoy lied under oath when he testified to Congress on August 24 that he did not order the restrictions on overtime. At this congressional testimony DeJoy admitted that he was unaware of the cost of mailing a postcard or a smaller greeting card, the starting rate for US Priority Mail, or how many Americans voted by mail in the 2016 elections.

In September 2020, a court blocked the USPS from sending Colorado households a mailer with false and misleading information about vote-by-mail for Colorado. Secretaries of state had requested that DeJoy show them previews of the mailers that the USPS intended to send out, but DeJoy refused, according to Colorado secretary of state Jena Griswold. The suit was settled that month, with the USPS agreeing to show previews of any future election mailers or materials to Colorado's secretary of state and attorney general for their review and potential veto. The next month, USPS agreed to reverse all changes implemented in June that affected mail services to Montana, settling a lawsuit brought by the state's governor against the institution and DeJoy a day before a hearing was to take place in U.S. District Court in Great Falls. The government institution agreed to reverse removal of collection boxes and mail sorting machines, closure or consolidation of mail processing facilities, reduced retail hours, banning or restricting overtime, and restriction of late or extra trips for timely mail delivery, affecting all 50 states. USPS was sued in federal court in September 2020 by American Oversight to "compel the release of directives, guidance, analyses, and key emails from Postmaster General Louis DeJoy and his chief of staff related to voting by mail" after USPS failed to respond to FOIA requests for such information within the legally designated time period. When USPS released DeJoy's calendar in response to the lawsuit, it was almost entirely redacted.

A March 2021 report from the Postal Service's inspector general found that the vast majority of mail-in ballots and registration materials in the 2020 election were delivered to the relevant authorities on time.

==== Relationship with the Biden administration ====
In February 2021, amid criticism and concern by Democratic lawmakers about the USPS under DeJoy, Biden nominated three people to fill four vacancies on the USPS board of governors. The board of governors, rather than the president of the United States, has the authority to remove the postmaster general. That same month, DeJoy stated that despite there being a change in president, he did not intend to leave the position, and said that he planned to be in the role "a long time, get used to me".

DeJoy angered some congressional Democrats, who repeatedly called for his firing, by not waiting to consult with the new board members on his 10-year turnaround plan, though the plan did promise to consult the board before implementing various changes.

After the Biden administration contacted the Postal Service about the possibility of mailing free COVID-19 test kits to Americans in December 2021, DeJoy used his previous private-sector logistics expertise to help the USPS deliver approximately 380 million home test kits from January 2022 through May 2022.

In February and March 2022, DeJoy worked with Rep. Carolyn Maloney and Rep. James Comer to build bipartisan support for the Postal Service Reform Act of 2022, which lifted financial burdens placed on the Postal Service by the 2006 Postal Accountability and Enhancement Act and required the agency to continue delivering mail six days per week. The bill was signed into law by President Joe Biden on April 6, 2022. DeJoy's efforts to lobby Republican lawmakers on the bill, including specific 10-year financial plans, were seen as influential in getting Republican support for a Democratic policy priority.

==== Fleet procurement controversies ====
DeJoy received criticism for his decision on February 24, 2021, to award a $6.5 billion contract to modernize the USPS fleet exclusively to Oshkosh, which had previously admitted a lack of expertise in producing electric vehicles and would therefore be unable to make good on President Biden's pledge to make the USPS 100% electric. In addition, Congressman Tim Ryan referred to the SEC a $54 million purchase of Oshkosh stock made hours before the contract was announced.

Democrats criticized DeJoy's February 2022 order for $11.3 billion of mostly gasoline-powered replacement vehicles, with Virginia representative Gerry Connolly saying DeJoy had "flouted" President Biden's executive order on clean procurement. The EPA also criticized the USPS for the order, pointing to the environmental costs of the fleet ($900 million of damage over 20 years), the low fuel efficiency, and the short-sightedness of making a long-term investment in gasoline-powered vehicles. DeJoy cited an ongoing Postal Service environmental review as well as the agency's grave financial condition as reasons for not including more electric vehicles in the initial order.

In March, Congress passed the Postal Service Reform Act of 2022, improving the financial situation of the USPS. In April 2022, 16 states, the District of Columbia, and 4 environmental groups sued the agency over the environmental impact of its slow vehicle electrification plan and demanded a 75% electric order. In June 2022, DeJoy said his plan to centralize mail processing would reduce the cost of electric vehicle infrastructure; the Postal Service Office of Inspector General had said that 95% of delivery routes were suitable for electrification. In July, with the existing fleet at about 217,000, DeJoy announced a change in plans, going from 10% electric vehicles out of up to 160,000 (a custom design from Oshkosh only) to 40% electric out of 84,500 (only 25,000 gas and 25,000 electric from Oshkosh).

In August, the Inflation Reduction Act included $3 billion for electric USPS vehicles. In December 2022, DeJoy announced yet another change in plans for purchases through 2028: an order of 60,000 custom-made vehicles from Oshkosh (75% electric) plus 21,000 EVs from other manufacturers. After 2026, the agency expects 100% of its purchases to be electric. The first order in this plan, a contract to purchase 9,450 EVs manufactured by Ford and 14,000 electric vehicle charging stations, was announced in February 2023.

==== Ten-year reform plan ====
In March 2021, DeJoy issued a 10-year plan called "Delivering for America" to stabilize the finances of the Postal Service. The plan aims to bridge a $160 billion budget gap for the decade, and takes into account the long-term trend of declining first class mail volume due to Internet communication, and increasing package volume due to e-commerce (more than doubling since 2008). Provisions of the plan include:

- Lowering speed but increasing reliability for long-distance first class mail by shifting from air transport to ground transport.
  - Expand 2-day delivery radius for packages (from 6 to 8-hour drive time) and contract for letter mail (from 6-hours drive time or 280 miles, to 3-hour drive time or 140 miles)
  - Longest-distance first class deliveries went from 3 days (previously 57% of volume) to 4 days (931 to 1,907 miles, 21% of volume) or 5 days (1,908 miles +, 10% of volume).
  - Air transport expected to drop from 21% to 12% of first class mail volume
- Increasing capital investment from $25 to $40 billion, including more fuel-efficient vehicles better able to handle packages, new package sorting machines including for delivery units, post office retail and employee facility upgrades, and new mobile devices for employees
- Requests to Congress for funding for electric vehicles and $44 billion in relief from the requirement to pre-pay retiree health care costs (supplied by the Inflation Reduction Act and Postal Service Reform Act of 2022, respectively)
- $35–52 billion from increases in postage
- $19–29 billion increase in package revenue by making the product more attractive
  - More access points for package dropoff
  - Lower prices
  - 6-8-day delivery zones sped up to 5-day delivery
- Network efficiency gains overall $28–40 billion savings
- Decommissioning old mail sorting machines
- Consolidating carrier pickup and mail sorting operations in "sorting and delivery centers" and removing those responsibilities from individual post offices
- Converting all Network Distribution Centers into Regional Distribution Centers which only handle packages, by moving Marketing Mail and Periodicals to Processing and Distribution Centers, and converting 15-20 PD&Cs to RDCs
- Accounting changes with regard to the Civil Service Retirement System to produce $14 billion in savings (yet to be negotiated with the executive branch)
- Reducing employee turnover, including by increasing career-track hires
- Reducing hours at some post offices

In 2024, DeJoy was criticized for the implementation of larger regional hubs, which he said would slow mail delivery for rural customers but increase its speed for those who lived close to regional hubs.

===== Criticisms of the plan =====
Multiple Congresspeople have criticized DeJoy's plans, including Georgia Senator Jon Ossoff and Virginia Representative Gerry Connolly, for the effects that DeJoy's proposals have had on mail delivery, especially in areas with delivery hubs that have been updated, such as Sandston, Virginia; Palmetto, Georgia; and Portland, Oregon. In 2023 alone, Georgia saw a 50% drop in the on-time delivery rate of first-class mail, although it has re-increased by 40%. Ossoff introduced the Postmaster General Reform Act, which would require postmasters to be elected by the Senate; currently, they are chosen by the USPS Board of Governors.

Letter to Congressional Leaders (March 13, 2025)

===== Departure from USPS =====
On February 18, 2025, DeJoy announced his intention to step down from the role of Postmaster General, asking the Postal Service Board of Governors to begin a search for his successor.

On March 12, 2025, DeJoy entered into an agreement with "DOGE representatives to assist [the USPS] in identifying and achieving further efficiencies" outlined in the Delivering for America reform plan. In a letter to Congress, DeJoy confirmed that DOGE would have limited access to Postal Service data. Additionally, two USPS union leaders said that DeJoy assured them there were provisions in the agreement that would prevent DOGE from having unchecked access to postal workers' employee records.

On March 24, 2025, DeJoy resigned his position. Doug Tulino then became the acting Postmaster General before the confirmation of David P. Steiner to the post.

== Other donations and board work ==
DeJoy donated $747,000 to Duke University in 2014, funding Blue Devil Tower and the DeJoy Family Club at the football stadium. That year, his son was accepted to the school and joined the school's tennis team as a walk-on.

In 2005, DeJoy and his wife founded the Louis DeJoy and Aldona Wos Family Foundation, through which they have provided donations to academic scholarships, including establishing the DeJoy-Wos Odyssey Scholars Endowment at Elon University. DeJoy is on the board of the Fund for American Studies.

DeJoy serves on the Elon University board of trustees.

== Personal life ==
DeJoy is married to Aldona Wos, a Polish-American former physician and former ambassador to Estonia during the George W. Bush administration. From 2017 to 2021 she served as the vice chair of the 45th President's Commission on White House Fellowships. President Trump announced his intent to nominate her as Ambassador to Canada on February 11, 2020. Her nomination stalled before the U.S. Senate Committee on Foreign Relations, expired when the new Congress was sworn in on January 3, 2021, and returned to the President under Rule XXXI, Paragraph 6 of the U.S. Senate.

The couple have twin children and maintain at least two homes: one in the Kalorama neighborhood in Washington, D.C., and the other, from prior to DeJoy's government appointment and bought with Wos in 2005, a 10,900-square-foot (1,010 m^{2}) mansion in the Irving Park Historic District next to the Greensboro Country Club Golf Course in Greensboro, North Carolina. The latter has been the location of several political fundraising events.

== See also ==
- Postal voting in the United States
- United States Postal Service

Government offices
Preceded by Megan Brennan	United States Postmaster General; 2020–2025	Succeeded by Doug Tulino; Acting
