= United States Postmaster General =

Chief executive of the US Postal Service

- Incumbent; David P. Steiner since July 15, 2025
- United States Postal Service
- Style: Postmaster General
- Status: Chief executive
- Member of: Board of Governors of the United States Postal Service
- Seat: 475 L'Enfant Plaza SW, Washington, D.C. 20260
- Appointer: Board of Governors
- Term length: No fixed term
- Constituting instrument: Postal Reorganization Act of 1970, 39 U.S.C. § 203
- Formation: 1775
- First holder: Benjamin Franklin
- Deputy: Deputy Postmaster General
- Salary: $303,460

The United States postmaster general (PMG) is the chief executive officer of the United States Postal Service (USPS). The PMG is responsible for managing and directing the day-to-day operations of the agency.

The PMG is selected and appointed by the Board of Governors of the Postal Service, which is appointed by the president. The postmaster general then also sits on the board. The PMG does not serve at the president's pleasure and can only be dismissed by the Board of Governors. The appointment of the postmaster general does not require Senate confirmation. The governors and the postmaster general elect the deputy postmaster general.

The current postmaster general is David Steiner, who has served in the role since July 15, 2025.

== History ==
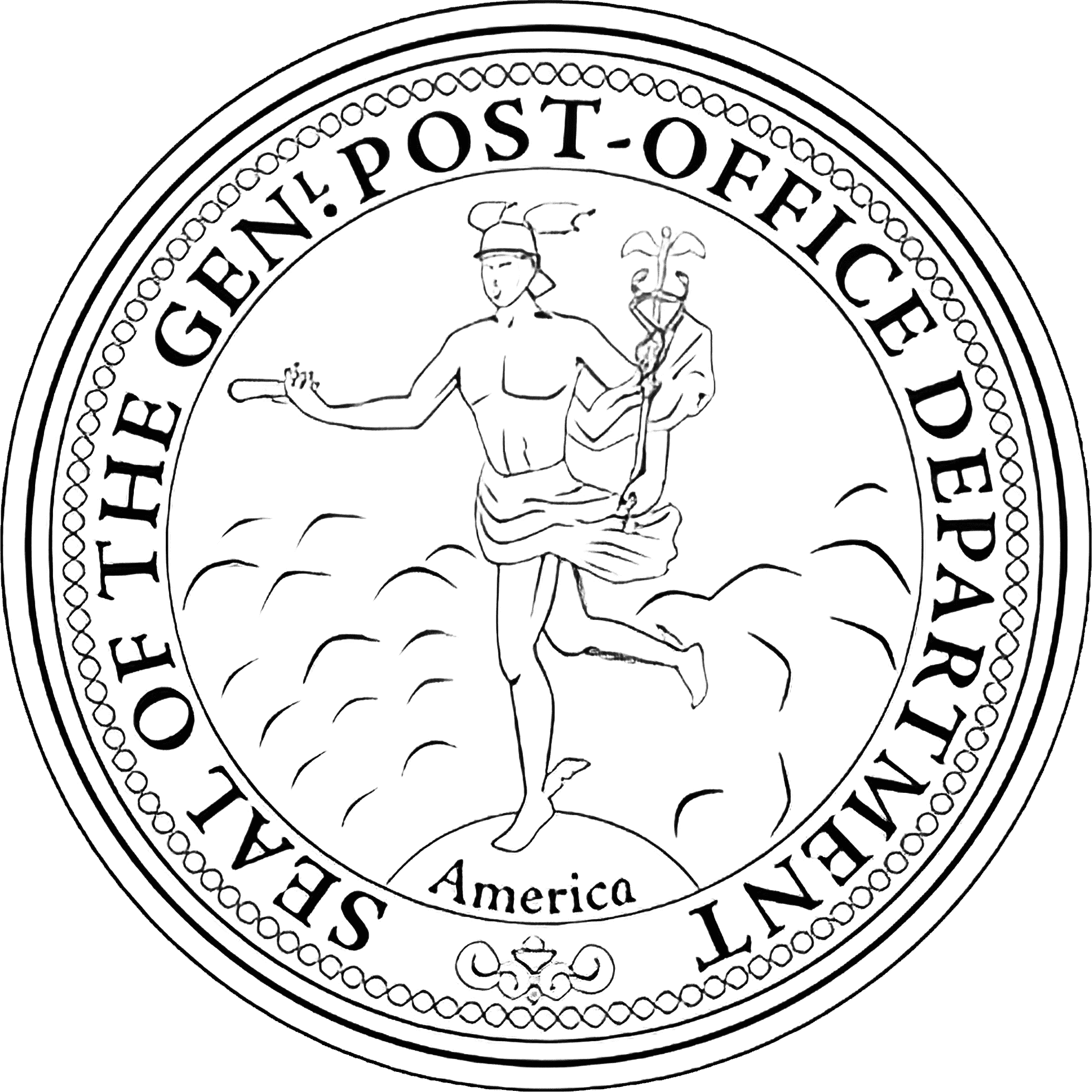
The first Post Office Department seal, depicting the deity Mercury, used until 1837.

The office of U.S. postmaster general predates the country's founding. Benjamin Franklin was appointed by the Continental Congress as the first postmaster general in 1775; he had previously served as deputy postmaster general for British America since 1753. The formal office of the United States postmaster general was established by act of government on September 22, 1789.

From 1829 to 1971, the postmaster general was the head of the Post Office Department (or simply "Post Office" until the 1820s) and was a member of the president's Cabinet. During that era, the postmaster general was appointed by the president of the United States, with the advice and consent of the United States Senate.

After passage of the Pendleton Civil Service Reform Act in 1883 and prior to the passage of the Hatch Act of 1939, the postmaster general was in charge of the governing party's patronage and was a powerful position which held much influence within the party, as exemplified by James Farley's tenure from 1933 to 1940 under Franklin D. Roosevelt.

After the spoils system was reformed, the position remained a Cabinet post, and it was often given to a new president's campaign manager or other key political supporters, including Arthur Summerfield, W. Marvin Watson, and Larry O'Brien, each of whom played important roles organizing the campaigns of presidents Dwight Eisenhower, John F. Kennedy, and Lyndon B. Johnson, respectively, and was considered something of a sinecure. Poet and literary scholar Charles Olson, who served as a Democratic National Committee official during the 1944 U.S. presidential election, declined the position in January 1945.

In 1971, the Post Office Department was re-organized into the United States Postal Service, an independent agency of the executive branch. The postmaster general is now appointed by the Board of Governors of the United States Postal Service, not appointed by the president. As such, the postmaster general is no longer a member of the Cabinet or in line of presidential succession.

== List of postmasters general ==
The following persons held the position of postmaster general:

=== Under the Continental Congress (1775–1789) ===
No.	Name	Start	End
1	Benjamin Franklin	July 26, 1775	November 7, 1776
2	Richard Bache	November 7, 1776	January 28, 1782
3	Ebenezer Hazard	January 28, 1782	September 26, 1789

=== US Post Office Department (1789–1971) ===
==== As non-Cabinet department (1789–1829) ====
Parties

Independent Federalist Democratic-Republican

No.	Name	State	Start	End	Assistant PMG	President(s)
4	Samuel Osgood	Massachusetts	September 26, 1789	August 12, 1791	Jonathan Burrall	George Washington (1789–1797)
5	Timothy Pickering	Pennsylvania	August 12, 1791	January 1, 1795	Charles Burrall	George Washington (1789–1797)
5	Timothy Pickering	Pennsylvania	August 12, 1791	January 1, 1795	Prosper Wetmore	George Washington (1789–1797)
5	Timothy Pickering	Pennsylvania	August 12, 1791	January 1, 1795	Charles Burrall	George Washington (1789–1797)
6	Joseph Habersham	Georgia	February 25, 1795	November 28, 1801	Charles Burrall	George Washington (1789–1797)
6	Joseph Habersham	Georgia	February 25, 1795	November 28, 1801	Charles Burrall	John Adams (1797–1801)
6	Joseph Habersham	Georgia	February 25, 1795	November 28, 1801	Abraham Bradley, Jr.	Thomas Jefferson (1801–1809)
7	Gideon Granger	Connecticut	November 28, 1801	March 17, 1814	Abraham Bradley, Jr.	Thomas Jefferson (1801–1809)
7	Gideon Granger	Connecticut	November 28, 1801	March 17, 1814	Abraham Bradley, Jr.	James Madison (1809–1817)
8	Return Meigs	Ohio	March 17, 1814	June 26, 1823	Abraham Bradley, Jr.	James Madison (1809–1817)
8	Return Meigs	Ohio	March 17, 1814	June 26, 1823	Abraham Bradley, Jr.	James Monroe (1817–1825)
9	John McLean	Ohio	June 26, 1823	March 4, 1829	Abraham Bradley, Jr.	James Monroe (1817–1825)
9	John McLean	Ohio	June 26, 1823	March 4, 1829	Abraham Bradley, Jr.	John Quincy Adams (1825–1829)

==== As Cabinet Department (1829–1971) ====
Parties

Democratic Whig Republican

No.	Portrait	Name	State	Start	End	Assistant PMG	President(s)
10		William Barry	Kentucky	March 9, 1829	April 10, 1835	Charles K. Gardner	Andrew Jackson (1829–1837)
11		Amos Kendall	Kentucky	May 1, 1835	May 18, 1840	Charles K. Gardner	Andrew Jackson (1829–1837)
11		Amos Kendall	Kentucky	May 1, 1835	May 18, 1840	Selah R. Hobbie	Martin Van Buren (1837–1841)
12		John Niles	Connecticut	May 19, 1840	March 4, 1841	Selah R. Hobbie	Martin Van Buren (1837–1841)
13		Francis Granger	New York	March 6, 1841	September 18, 1841	Selah R. Hobbie	William Henry Harrison (1841)
13		Francis Granger	New York	March 6, 1841	September 18, 1841	Selah R. Hobbie	John Tyler (1841-1845)
14		Charles Wickliffe	Kentucky	September 18, 1841	March 4, 1845	Selah R. Hobbie	John Tyler (1841-1845)
15		Cave Johnson	Tennessee	March 6, 1845	March 4, 1849	Selah R. Hobbie	James K. Polk (1845-1849)
16		Jacob Collamer	Vermont	March 8, 1849	July 22, 1850	Selah R. Hobbie	Zachary Taylor (1849–1850)
17		Nathan Hall	New York	July 23, 1850	August 31, 1852	Selah R. Hobbie	Millard Fillmore (1850–1853)
17		Nathan Hall	New York	July 23, 1850	August 31, 1852	Solomon D. Jacobs	Millard Fillmore (1850–1853)
18		Samuel Hubbard	Connecticut	August 31, 1852	March 4, 1853	Solomon D. Jacobs	Millard Fillmore (1850–1853)
18		Samuel Hubbard	Connecticut	August 31, 1852	March 4, 1853	Selah R. Hobbie	Millard Fillmore (1850–1853)
19		James Campbell	Pennsylvania	March 7, 1853	March 4, 1857	Selah R. Hobbie	Franklin Pierce (1853–1857)
19		James Campbell	Pennsylvania	March 7, 1853	March 4, 1857	Horatio King	Franklin Pierce (1853–1857)
20		Aaron Brown	Tennessee	March 6, 1857	March 8, 1859	Horatio King	James Buchanan (1857–1861)
21		Joseph Holt	Kentucky	March 9, 1859	December 31, 1860	Horatio King	James Buchanan (1857–1861)
22		Horatio King	Maine	February 12, 1861	March 4, 1861	William H. Dundas (Second Asst. Postmaster General)	James Buchanan (1857–1861)
23		Montgomery Blair	District of Columbia	March 5, 1861	September 24, 1864	John A. Kasson	Abraham Lincoln (1861–1865)
24		William Dennison	Ohio	September 24, 1864	July 25, 1866		Abraham Lincoln (1861–1865)
24		William Dennison	Ohio	September 24, 1864	July 25, 1866		Andrew Johnson (1865–1869)
25		Alexander Randall	Wisconsin	July 25, 1866	March 4, 1869		Andrew Johnson (1865–1869)
26		John Creswell	Maryland	March 5, 1869	June 22, 1874		Ulysses S. Grant (1869–1877)
27		James Marshall	Virginia	July 3, 1874	August 24, 1874		Ulysses S. Grant (1869–1877)
28		Marshall Jewell	Connecticut	August 24, 1874	July 12, 1876		Ulysses S. Grant (1869–1877)
29		James Tyner	Indiana	July 12, 1876	March 3, 1877		Ulysses S. Grant (1869–1877)
30		David Key	Tennessee	March 12, 1877	June 2, 1880		Rutherford B. Hayes (1887–1881)
31		Horace Maynard	Tennessee	June 2, 1880	March 4, 1881		Rutherford B. Hayes (1887–1881)
32		Thomas James	New York	March 5, 1881	December 20, 1881		James A. Garfield (1881)
32		Thomas James	New York	March 5, 1881	December 20, 1881		Chester A. Arthur (1881–1885)
33		Timothy Howe	Wisconsin	December 20, 1881	March 25, 1883		Chester A. Arthur (1881–1885)
34		Walter Gresham	Indiana	April 3, 1883	September 4, 1884		Chester A. Arthur (1881–1885)
35		Frank Hatton	Iowa	October 14, 1884	March 4, 1885		Chester A. Arthur (1881–1885)
36		William Vilas	Wisconsin	March 6, 1885	January 6, 1888		Grover Cleveland (1885–1889)
37		Donald Dickinson	Michigan	January 6, 1888	March 4, 1889		Grover Cleveland (1885–1889)
38		John Wanamaker	Pennsylvania	March 5, 1889	March 4, 1893		Benjamin Harrison (1889–1893)
39		Wilson Bissell	New York	March 6, 1893	March 1, 1895		Grover Cleveland (1893–1897)
40		William Wilson	West Virginia	March 1, 1895	March 4, 1897		Grover Cleveland (1893–1897)
41		James Gary	Maryland	March 5, 1897	April 21, 1898		William McKinley (1897–1901)
42		Charles Smith	Pennsylvania	April 21, 1898	January 8, 1902		William McKinley (1897–1901)
42		Charles Smith	Pennsylvania	April 21, 1898	January 8, 1902		Theodore Roosevelt (1901–1909)
43		Henry Payne	Wisconsin	January 9, 1902	October 4, 1904		Theodore Roosevelt (1901–1909)
44		Robert Wynne	Pennsylvania	October 10, 1904	March 5, 1905		Theodore Roosevelt (1901–1909)
45		George Cortelyou	New York	March 6, 1905	January 14, 1907		Theodore Roosevelt (1901–1909)
46		George Meyer	Massachusetts	January 15, 1907	March 4, 1909		Theodore Roosevelt (1901–1909)
47		Frank Hitchcock	Massachusetts	March 5, 1909	March 4, 1913		William Howard Taft (1909–1913)
48		Albert Burleson	Texas	March 5, 1913	March 4, 1921		Woodrow Wilson (1913–1921)
49		Will Hays	Indiana	March 5, 1921	March 3, 1922		Warren G. Harding (1921–1923)
50		Hubert Work	Colorado	March 4, 1922	March 4, 1923		Warren G. Harding (1921–1923)
51		Harry New	Indiana	March 4, 1923	March 3, 1929		Warren G. Harding (1921–1923)
51		Harry New	Indiana	March 4, 1923	March 3, 1929		Calvin Coolidge (1923–1929)
52		Walter Brown	Ohio	March 5, 1929	March 4, 1933		Herbert Hoover (1929–1933)
53		James Farley	New York	March 4, 1933	September 10, 1940		Franklin D. Roosevelt (1933–1945)
54		Frank Walker	Pennsylvania	September 10, 1940	May 8, 1945		Franklin D. Roosevelt (1933–1945)
54		Frank Walker	Pennsylvania	September 10, 1940	May 8, 1945		Harry S. Truman (1945–1953)
55		Robert Hannegan	Missouri	May 8, 1945	December 15, 1947		Harry S. Truman (1945–1953)
56		Jesse Donaldson	Missouri	December 16, 1947	January 20, 1953		Harry S. Truman (1945–1953)
57		Arthur Summerfield	Michigan	January 21, 1953	January 20, 1961		Dwight D. Eisenhower (1953–1961)
58		Edward Day	California	January 21, 1961	August 9, 1963		John F. Kennedy (1961–1963)
59		John Gronouski	Wisconsin	September 30, 1963	November 2, 1965		John F. Kennedy (1961–1963)
59		John Gronouski	Wisconsin	September 30, 1963	November 2, 1965		Lyndon B. Johnson (1963–1969)
60		Larry O'Brien	Massachusetts	November 3, 1965	April 10, 1968		Lyndon B. Johnson (1963–1969)
61		Marvin Watson	Texas	April 26, 1968	January 20, 1969		Lyndon B. Johnson (1963–1969)
62		Winton Blount	Alabama	January 22, 1969	January 1, 1971		Richard Nixon (1969–1974)

=== US Postal Service (1971–present) ===
Denotes acting capacity.

No.	Portrait	Name	Start	End	President(s)
62		Winton Blount	January 1, 1971	January 1, 1972	Richard Nixon (1969–1974)
63		Ted Klassen	January 1, 1972	February 16, 1975	Richard Nixon (1969–1974)
63		Ted Klassen	January 1, 1972	February 16, 1975	Gerald Ford (1974–1977)
64		Benjamin Bailar	February 16, 1975	March 15, 1978	Gerald Ford (1974–1977)
64		Benjamin Bailar	February 16, 1975	March 15, 1978	Jimmy Carter (1977–1981)
65		William Bolger	March 15, 1978	January 1, 1985	Jimmy Carter (1977–1981)
65		William Bolger	March 15, 1978	January 1, 1985	Ronald Reagan (1981–1989)
66		Paul Carlin	January 1, 1985	January 7, 1986	Ronald Reagan (1981–1989)
67		Albert Casey	January 7, 1986	August 16, 1986	Ronald Reagan (1981–1989)
68		Preston Tisch	August 16, 1986	March 1, 1988	Ronald Reagan (1981–1989)
69		Anthony Frank	March 1, 1988	July 6, 1992	Ronald Reagan (1981–1989)
69		Anthony Frank	March 1, 1988	July 6, 1992	George H. W. Bush (1989–1993)
70		Marvin Runyon	July 6, 1992	May 16, 1998	George H. W. Bush (1989–1993)
70		Marvin Runyon	July 6, 1992	May 16, 1998	Bill Clinton (1993–2001)
71		William Henderson	May 16, 1998	May 31, 2001	Bill Clinton (1993–2001)
71		William Henderson	May 16, 1998	May 31, 2001	George W. Bush (2001–2009)
72		John Potter	June 1, 2001	December 6, 2010	George W. Bush (2001–2009)
72		John Potter	June 1, 2001	December 6, 2010	Barack Obama (2009–2017)
73		Patrick Donahoe	January 14, 2011	February 1, 2015	Barack Obama (2009–2017)
74		Megan Brennan	February 1, 2015	June 15, 2020	Barack Obama (2009–2017)
74		Megan Brennan	February 1, 2015	June 15, 2020	Donald Trump (2017–2021)
75		Louis DeJoy	June 15, 2020	March 24, 2025	Donald Trump (2017–2021)
75		Louis DeJoy	June 15, 2020	March 24, 2025	Joe Biden (2021–2025)
75		Louis DeJoy	June 15, 2020	March 24, 2025	Donald Trump (2025–present)
–		Doug Tulino; Acting	March 25, 2025	July 14, 2025	Donald Trump (2025–present)
76		David Steiner	July 15, 2025	present	Donald Trump (2025–present)

== See also ==
- Postmaster General
- John Reagan, the only postmaster general of the Confederate States
