= Robert E. Hannegan =

American politician (1903–49)

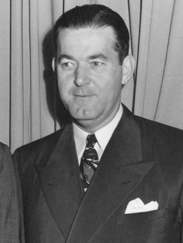
- Hannegan in 1944

52nd United States Postmaster General
- In office June 30, 1945 – December 15, 1947
- President: Harry S. Truman
- Preceded by: Frank C. Walker
- Succeeded by: Jesse M. Donaldson

Chair of the Democratic National Committee
- In office January 23, 1944 – October 29, 1947
- Preceded by: Frank C. Walker
- Succeeded by: J. Howard McGrath

27th Commissioner of Internal Revenue
- In office October 9, 1943 – January 22, 1944
- President: Franklin D. Roosevelt
- Preceded by: Guy T. Helvering
- Succeeded by: Harold Graves (Acting)

Personal details
- Born: Robert Emmet Hannegan; June 30, 1903 St. Louis, Missouri, U.S.
- Died: October 6, 1949 (aged 46) St. Louis, Missouri, U.S.
- Resting place: Calvary Cemetery
- Party: Democratic
- Spouse: Irma Protzmann
- Education: Saint Louis University (LLB)

Robert Emmet Hannegan (June 30, 1903 – October 6, 1949) was an American politician who served as Commissioner of Internal Revenue from October 1943 to January 1944. He also served as chairman of the Democratic National Committee from 1944 to 1947 and United States Postmaster General from 1945 to 1947. At the conclusion of his political career in 1947, Hannegan and his business partner Fred Saigh purchased the St. Louis Cardinals, a Major League Baseball team. But Hannegan, by then ill with heart disease, sold his share of the team ownership to Saigh a few months before his death.

== Political career ==
A power broker in the St. Louis Democratic Party allied with Senator Bennett Clark, Hannegan helped save the political career of Harry S. Truman in 1940 following the tax fraud conviction of Truman's ally, Kansas City boss Tom Pendergast. Hannegan supported Truman for re-election to the U.S. Senate when he was challenged in the Democratic primary by Governor Lloyd C. Stark and Maurice M. Milligan, who both sought credit for bringing down Pendergast. Truman re-won the seat with increased support in St. Louis, particularly from Catholic neighborhoods in which Hannegan wielded considerable influence. In his second term, Truman achieved national prominence by chairing a Senate committee investigating government waste in defense contracts. When Franklin D. Roosevelt offered Truman the position of DNC chairman, Truman declined but recommended Hannegan.

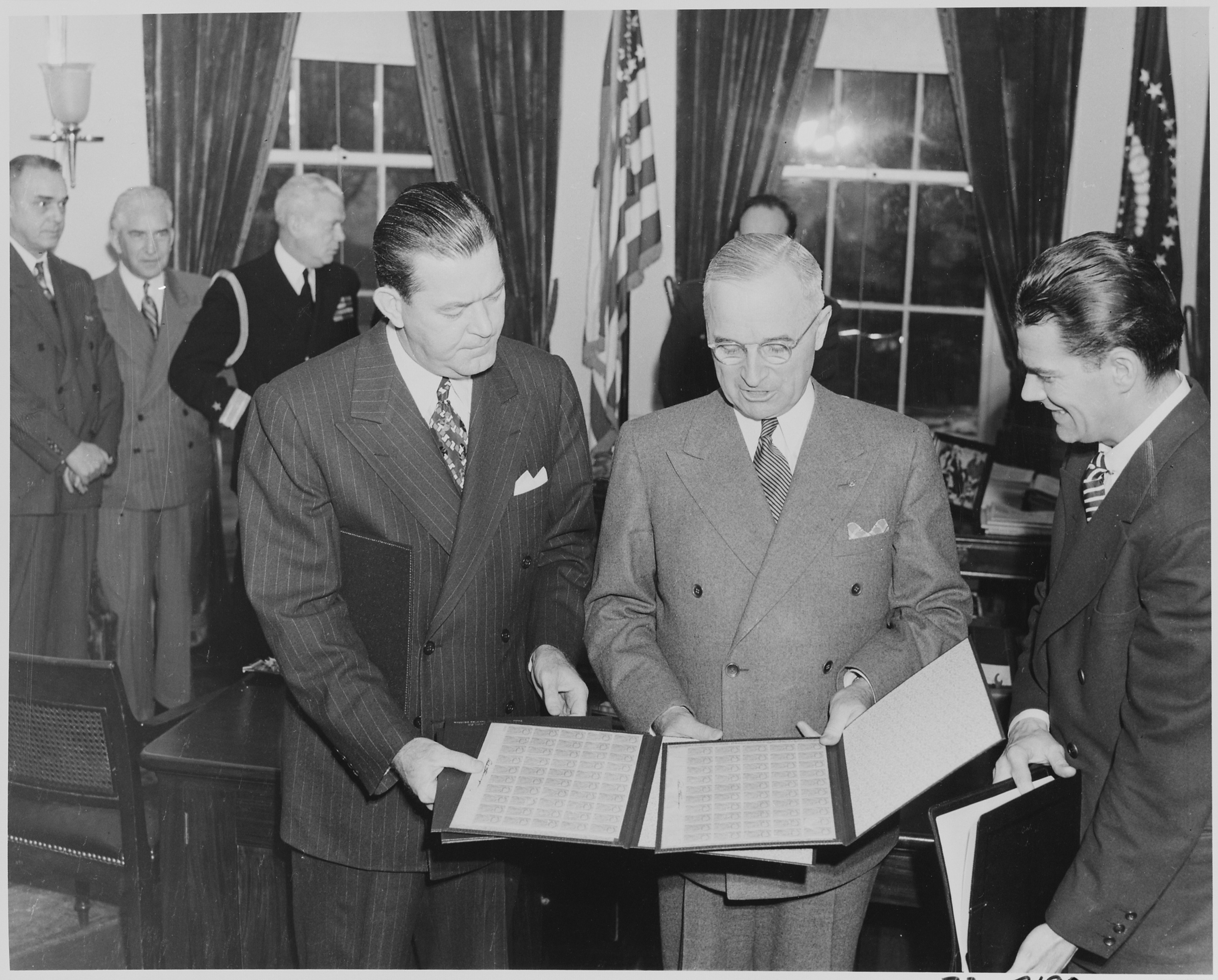
Postmaster General Hannegan, (left) with the President Harry S. Truman at the Oval Office, in 1946.

In 1944, Roosevelt appointed Hannegan, who had been the Collector of Internal Revenue in St. Louis, to the DNC after testing him by asking for his help with his income tax return. As Democratic chairman, Hannegan was responsible for brokering the deal that made Truman Roosevelt's running mate that year. Shortly before the 1944 Democratic National Convention, Roosevelt famously sent Hannegan a letter stating he would be "happy to run with" either Truman or Supreme Court Justice William O. Douglas. Vice President Henry A. Wallace nearly won the nomination, but Hannegan worked feverishly to secure Truman's nomination. Hannegan later joked he wanted his tombstone inscribed with the words "Here lies the man who stopped Henry Wallace from becoming President of the United States."

Though plagued with ill health for much of his tenure as party chairman, Hannegan emphasized voter turnout efforts in Roosevelt's 1944 re-election campaign and prevented an upset by Thomas Dewey, who won a surprising 46 percent of the popular vote that year. He promoted a liberal policy agenda for the national party and was a strong advocate of labor unions. Hannegan stepped down as chairman after Democrats suffered congressional losses in the 1946 midterm elections, but his ideological focus at the helm of the party contributed to Truman's upset win in the presidential election of 1948, and influenced his Fair Deal proposals.

== Death ==
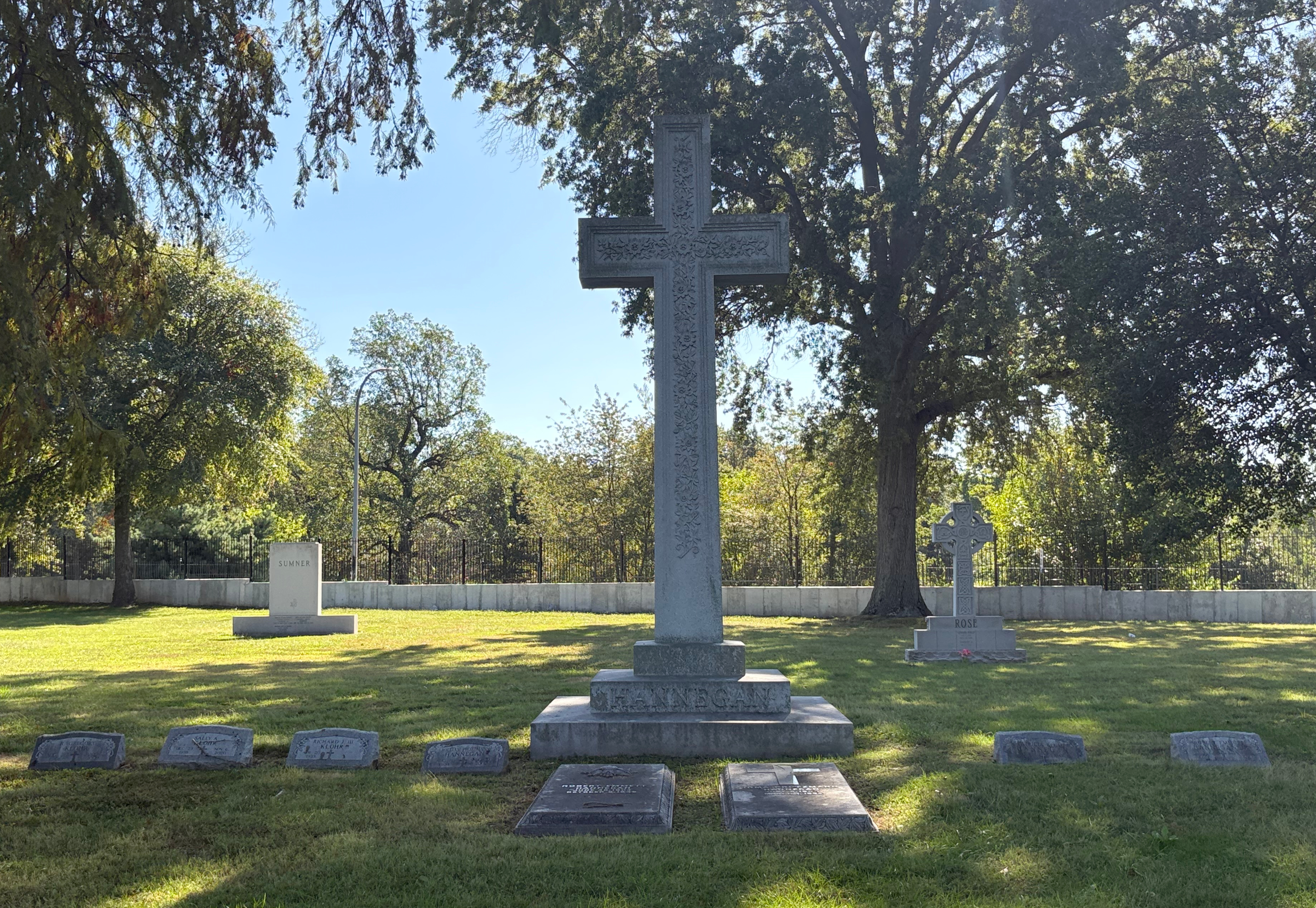
Hannegan's grave at Calvary Cemetery

Hannegan died in St. Louis, Missouri, on October 6, 1949. He is interred in Calvary Cemetery.

== In popular culture ==
Hannegan was mentioned in the film Miracle on 34th Street in his role as Postmaster General. Therefore, in the film, by implication, he was responsible for affirming that the central character, Mr. Kris Kringle, was the one and only Santa Claus.

Hannegan was portrayed by actor John Finn in the 1995 film Truman.

Government offices
Preceded by Guy T. Helvering	Commissioner of Internal Revenue; 1943–1944	Succeeded by Harold Graves; Acting
Party political offices
Preceded by Frank C. Walker	Chair of the Democratic National Committee; 1944–1947	Succeeded by J. Howard McGrath
Political offices
Preceded by Frank C. Walker	United States Postmaster General; 1945–1947	Succeeded by Jesse M. Donaldson
