= Robert M. Duncan =

Robert M. Duncan may refer to:

- Robert Morton Duncan (1927–2012), United States federal judge
- Mike Duncan (politician) (Robert M. Duncan, born 1951), chairman of the Republican National Committee
- Robert M. Duncan (Oregon politician), former president of the Oregon State Senate
- Robert M. Duncan Jr. (born 1978), United States Attorney for the Eastern District of Kentucky

== See also ==
- Robert Duncan (disambiguation)
