= Ken Mehlman =

American lawyer (born 1966)

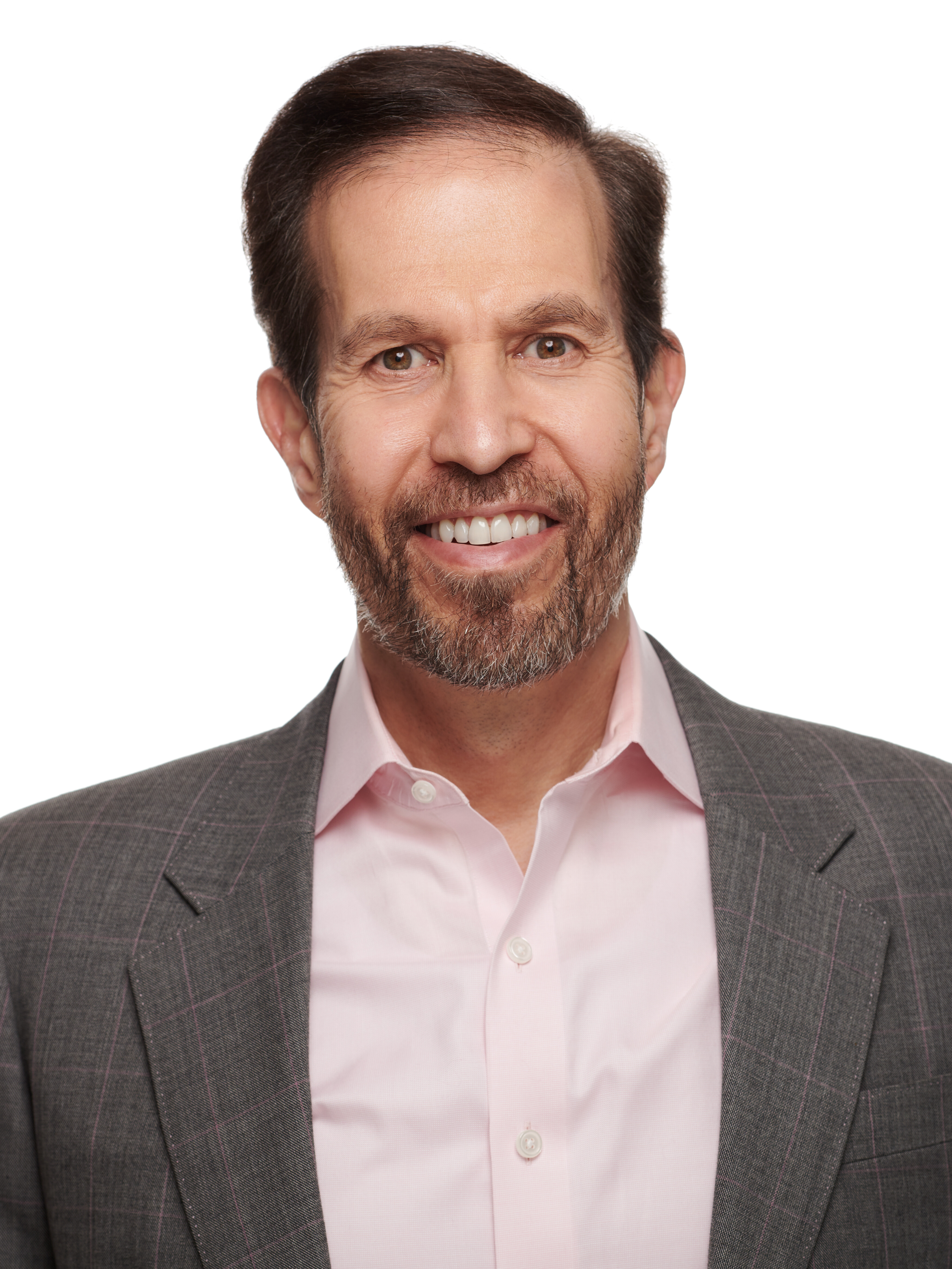
- Mehlman in 2021

Chair of the Republican National Committee
- In office January 19, 2005 – January 19, 2007
- Preceded by: Ed Gillespie
- Succeeded by: Mike Duncan (National Chair); Mel Martínez (General Chair)

White House Director of Political Affairs
- In office January 20, 2001 – May 23, 2003
- President: George W. Bush
- Preceded by: Minyon Moore
- Succeeded by: Matt Schlapp

Personal details
- Born: Kenneth Brian Mehlman; August 21, 1966 (age 60) Baltimore, Maryland, U.S.
- Party: Republican
- Education: Franklin and Marshall College (BA); Harvard University (JD)

Kenneth Brian Mehlman (born August 21, 1966) is an American social entrepreneur and businessman. He serves as a member, global head of public affairs, and co-head of KKR global impact at investment firm Kohlberg Kravis Roberts. He oversees the firm's responsible investment efforts, leading the firm's Environmental Social Governance programs. Prior to joining KKR, Mehlman spent a year as an attorney and partner at law firm Akin Gump Strauss Hauer & Feld. In January 2017, Mehlman announced that he would act as chairman of the Chan Zuckerberg Initiative Policy Advisory Board.

Mehlman held several national posts in the Republican Party and the George W. Bush administration. In 2000, he was appointed director of the White House Office of Political Affairs. Mehlman managed Bush's 2004 re-election campaign, and was 62nd Chairman of the Republican National Committee from 2005 to 2007. In 2007, Bush appointed Mehlman to a five-year term on the U.S. Holocaust Memorial Council.

In 2010, Mehlman came out as gay in an interview with journalist Marc Ambinder, which made him one of the few prominent openly gay figures in the Republican Party. He told Ambinder that he was aware that the Republican Party emphasized an anti-gay agenda but felt that he could not "go against the party consensus" when he held leadership positions. After coming out, Mehlman advocated for the recognition of same-sex marriage.

== Early life and education ==
Mehlman was born in Baltimore, Maryland. He is one of two sons born to Judith and Arthur Mehlman. His father was director of MuniMae and a former partner at KPMG, for which he was the head of the firm's auditing department in the Baltimore-Washington Metropolitan Area. Mehlman's brother, Bruce, works as a lobbyist at Mehlman Consulting.

Mehlman received his undergraduate degree in 1988 from Franklin and Marshall College in Lancaster, Pennsylvania, where he became a member of Phi Kappa Tau's Xi chapter. He received his J.D. from Harvard Law School in 1991, where he was a classmate of future President Barack Obama.

== Career ==
Mehlman practiced environmental law at Akin Gump Strauss Hauer & Feld in Washington, D.C. from 1991 to 1994, when he became legislative director to Representative Lamar S. Smith of Texas's 21st congressional district. Mehlman served as Smith's legislative director from 1994 to 1996, and then as chief of staff to Representative Kay Granger of Texas's 12th congressional district from 1996 to 1999.

Mehlman served as field director for the 2000 presidential campaign of George W. Bush. When Bush became president, Mehlman became director of the White House Office of Political Affairs. He managed the Bush re-election campaign in 2004. In January 2005, the American Association of Political Consultants gave Mehlman the "Campaign Manager of the Year" award for his management of the Bush/Cheney presidential ticket.

Mehlman joined Kohlberg Kravis Roberts & Co in 2008. As of 2021, he continues to be KKR's Global Head of Public Affairs and co-head of KKR Global Impact, helping assess and improve the companies in which KKR invests by engaging stakeholders & leveraging geopolitical & public policy trends. Mehlman also oversees the firm's global external affairs, including corporate marketing, regulatory affairs & public policy, and communications. Mehlman leads KKR's Environmental Social Governance (ESG) programs for the firm and its portfolio companies.

In addition to his role at KKR, Mehlman is a trustee of New York's Mount Sinai Hospital, Franklin & Marshall College, and Teach for America. He is a member of the Council on Foreign Relations, serves as chairman of the American Investment Council (previously the Private Equity Growth Capital Council), and is co-Chairman of the American Enterprise Institute's National Council. He is also a trustee and board member of Sponsors for Educational Opportunity (SEO). Mehlman was appointed to the board of directors of the Sustainability Accounting Standards Board in June, 2016.

On January 10, 2017, Mark Zuckerberg announced on Facebook that Mehlman and David Plouffe would be joining the Chan Zuckerberg Initiative. Mehlman will chair the philanthropy's public policy advisory board, which he stated in his official Facebook post will consist of "a diverse group of advisors and experts."

On March 4, 2021, Mehlman was elected to the board of directors of the United Negro College Fund (UNCF).

== Republican National Committee chairmanship ==
Mehlman was Bush's choice to replace Ed Gillespie as the chair of the Republican National Committee and was elected to the post on January 19, 2005. Mehlman announced after the November 2006 general election that he would not seek re-election to another term as Republican National Chairman. One of his top deputies, RNC political Director Michael DuHaime, announced in December 2006 that he would become campaign manager for Rudy Giuliani's 2008 presidential campaign.

Mehlman addressed the National Association for the Advancement of Colored People (NAACP) a full year before Bush addressed the civil rights organization. In his address to the NAACP on July 14, 2005, in Milwaukee, Wisconsin, Mehlman apologized for his party's failure to reach out to the black community in the aftermath of the Civil Rights Act of 1964, stating, "Some Republicans gave up on winning the African-American vote, looking the other way or trying to benefit politically from racial polarization... I am here as Republican chairman to tell you we were wrong."

Although Mehlman's speech seemed to suggest a new approach towards the African-American community, most have considered the approach to be unsuccessful, with several polls indicating that Republicans have not improved in terms of African-American approval. A Washington Post poll shows that Bush's approval rating among African Americans fell to two percent at one point, and a report card issued by the NAACP gave "F's" to a majority of Republicans in the 109th Congress.

As the head of the RNC, Mehlman played a key role, along with Karl Rove, in executing the Republican Party's long-term, yet ultimately unsuccessful, plan for electoral dominance. This is discussed at length in Peter Wallsten and Tom Hamburger's book, One Party Country. Mehlman voluntarily stepped down as chairman of the RNC at the end of 2006. He was succeeded by Mike Duncan and Mel Martinez.

In 2016, Mehlman was a vocal opponent of Donald Trump's in the primary and general election, and he publicly vowed to vote for Hillary Clinton.

== Phone jamming scandal ==
A Democratic analysis of phone records introduced at the 2005 criminal trial of James Tobin, the Northeast political director for the RNC in 2002, shows that Mehlman made 115 outgoing calls – mostly to the same number in the White House office of political affairs – between September 17 and November 22, 2002, when the office of political affairs was headed by Mehlman. Two dozen calls were made from 9:28 a.m. the day before the election through 2:17 a.m. on the night after the voting, a three-day period. Virtually all the calls to the White House went to the same phone number. In April 2006, Mehlman issued a statement on the matter, noting that his deputy for the Northeast states routinely discussed election business with RNC officials, and categorically stated that "none of my conversations nor the conversations of my staff, involved discussion of the phone-jamming incident." Tobin was convicted on December 15, 2005 "for his part in a plot to jam the Democratic Party's phones on Election Day 2002"; however, this conviction was later overturned by a federal appeals court and Tobin was acquitted on all charges.

== Coming out ==
In August 2010, Mehlman revealed that he is gay. Prior to this revelation, rumors about Mehlman's sexual orientation had circulated since at least 2004. In May 2006, Mehlman denied he was gay, telling the New York Daily News: "I'm not gay, but those stories did a number on my dating life for six months." On November 8, 2006, comedian Bill Maher made an appearance on Larry King Live, during which he referred to Mehlman as a closeted gay man. The incident became controversial because CNN edited out Maher's comments in later taped editions and removed the reference to Mehlman's sexual orientation from the transcript of the show. The day after Maher's comments, Mehlman announced he would step down as chairman of the RNC (although reports said that his resignation had been expected for some time).

Almost four years later, in an article in The Atlantic, Mehlman stated that he is in fact gay, and that he planned to be an advocate for legalizing same-sex marriage. According to the New York Times, Mehlman's "announcement makes him apparently the most prominent Republican official to come out." This disclosure followed years of him avoiding and denying inquiries about his sexual orientation. During his RNC chairmanship, Mehlman supported certain positions of the Republican Party, including opposition to same-sex marriage. Mehlman stated he could not have gone against party consensus, but acknowledged that, had he come out of the closet earlier, he might have been able to impact Republican efforts to pass state initiatives and referendums banning same-sex marriage.

=== Reactions ===
Marc Ambinder, who interviewed Mehlman and wrote The Atlantic article, said that Mehlman's roles with the RNC and the Bush campaign "coincided with the Republican Party's attempts to exploit anti-gay prejudices and cement the allegiance of social conservatives". A few commentators, such as Cenk Uygur and Michael Rogers, criticized Mehlman on The Ed Show, for having remained closeted about his sexuality while active in politics. Rogers has long advocated for the forced outing of closeted gay politicians who vote or advocate against LGBT interests.

Some segments of the LGBT community expressed support for Mehlman. Dustin Lance Black, the Academy Award-winning writer of Milk, said, "Ken represents an incredible coup for the American Foundation for Equal Rights ... As a victorious former presidential campaign manager and head of the Republican Party, Ken has the proven experience and expertise to help us communicate with people across each of the 50 states." Stephen Petrow, former president of the National Lesbian & Gay Journalists Association, wrote in a Huffington Post column, "... the 43-year old Mehlman found the courage to be honest about his identity with family, friends, former colleagues and current colleagues [who have] been wonderful and supportive." Gay & Lesbian Victory Fund President and CEO Chuck Wolfe said in a public statement, "We hope the fact that Ken Mehlman has reached this level of honesty will now encourage other political leaders to reject divisive anti-gay campaign tactics..."

== Equal rights advocacy ==
=== Support for same-sex marriage ===
In June 2011, Mehlman lobbied Republican members of the New York state legislature to support the legalization of same-sex marriage in New York and reached out to conservative donors and operatives.

Mehlman often spoke with undecided GOP senators, including three of the four who eventually voted in favor of the bill. Mehlman, who gained the support of many gay-rights backers, discussed the political and ideological reasons why lawmakers should vote for the bill. He said, "Letting two adults who love each other get married strengthens and promotes families." Mehlman told GOP senators that legalizing same-sex marriage aligned with Republican interests and principles. He emphasized that polls showed a significant shift toward voter support of same-sex marriage. Four Republican senators voted for the Marriage Equality Act.

Several gay rights leaders and bloggers recognized Mehlman's role. Mehlman was honored in Out Magazine's 2011's Out100 list partially because of his work on the campaign. Mehlman has been active in Maryland, New Hampshire and Washington State, helping to raise almost $3 million for these campaigns between August 2010 (when he came out) and March 2012. He continued to campaign for same-sex marriage, before United States v. Windsor, the 2013 United States Supreme Court decision which held that same-sex marriage is constitutional, by aiming to show GOP leaders why same-sex marriage "is consistent with Republican and conservative principles", and speaking on that topic throughout the country.

In January 2013, also before United States v. Windsor, Mehlman spoke with political activist David Kochel in Iowa about how supporting same-sex marriage is a conservative value. He stated that, "I'm a conservative because I believe in more freedom and I believe in less government. I think that we are endowed by our Creator, not by politicians, not by government, not by bureaucrats, with inalienable rights, including the pursuit of happiness. If you believe that, what could be more central to the pursuit of happiness than choosing the person that you love, that you have the right to marry?"

In February 2013, Mehlman helped organize an amicus curiae brief to the Supreme Court in the case of California Proposition 8 signed by dozens of prominent socially moderate Republicans, including Jon Huntsman, Jr., Meg Whitman, Ken Duberstein, Ileana Ros-Lehtinen, and others, explaining that they supported a Constitutional right to same-sex marriage. According to the New York Times, Ken Mehlman spent "months in quiet conversations with fellow Republicans to gather signatures for the brief." "We are trying to say to the court that we are judicial and political conservatives, and it is consistent with our values and philosophy for you to overturn Proposition 8," said Ken Mehlman according to the New York Times report.

In November 2013, Mehlman launched a non-profit organization called Project Right Side focused on convincing more Republicans to support marriage equality. The organization also conducts research and analysis in an effort to improve political conditions for LGBTQ issues. He stated that "Conservatives don't need to change core convictions to embrace the growing support for equal rights for gay Americans. It is sufficient to recognize the inherent conservatism in citizens' desire to marry, to be judged on their work, and not to be singled out for higher taxes or bullying at school. These objectives can be achieved while also protecting religious liberty, as demonstrated by states enacting civil marriage with exemptions for religious institutions."

In February 2014, Mehlman was a keynote speaker at the first campus-wide Harvard LGBTQ conference on the 45th anniversary of the Stonewall Riots where he was interviewed by Baruch Shemtov. He spoke during the closing remarks of the conference, stating "there's nothing more powerful than coming out and being who you are."

=== Don't Ask, Don't Tell legislation ===
Mehlman supported the repeal of the "Don't ask, don't tell" military policy introduced during President Bill Clinton's tenure. In 2010, Mehlman lobbied ten U.S. Senators to repeal the policy.

=== Workplace discrimination ===
Mehlman has also worked on LGBTQ non-discrimination issues. He actively helped Congressional leaders pass the Employment Non-Discrimination Act (ENDA) in the Senate in 2013. In July 2019, Mehlman filed an amicus brief, joined by close to three dozen other Republican leaders, arguing in support of the rights of LGBT people in the workplace. The brief argued that the Civil Rights Act of 1964 explicitly prohibits discrimination against gay men, lesbians and transgender people in the workplace due to language in the law that prohibits discrimination on the basis of sex. In addition, Mehlman wrote an op-ed for The New York Times outlining his reasons for believing that the fight for gay rights upholds the Republican values of economic freedom and personal liberty. In the piece, Mehlman writes that firing an employee because of their sexual orientation or gender identity is "... unethical and un-American, and the Supreme Court has the opportunity to read the clear language of Title VII [of the Civil Rights Act] and affirm that it is illegal."

== Personal life ==
Mehlman is Jewish and lives in New York City.

Political offices
Preceded by Minyon Moore	White House Director of Political Affairs; 2001–2003	Succeeded by Matt Schlapp
Party political offices
Preceded by Ed Gillespie	Chair of the Republican National Committee; 2005–2007	Succeeded by Mike Duncan as National Chair of the Republican National Committee
Preceded by Ed Gillespie	Chair of the Republican National Committee; 2005–2007	Succeeded by Mel Martínez as General Chair of the Republican National Committee
