= Robert Duncan =

Robert, Rob, Bob, or Bobby Duncan may refer to:

== Arts ==
- Robert Duncan (poet) (1919–1988), American poet

=== Film and television ===
- Robert Duncan (actor) (born 1952), British TV actor
- Bob Duncan, a character in Good Luck Charlie
- Rob Duncan of the visual effects team for Australia (2008 film)
- Long Rob Duncan, played by Derek Anders in Sunset Song (TV series)

=== Music ===
- Robert Duncan (writer) (born 1952), American music critic
- Robert Duncan (composer), American composer
- Rob Duncan, drummer for The Standard (band)
- Rob Duncan, musical collaborator with Lisbeth Scott

== Politics ==
- Robert Duncan (politician) (1850–1925), Unionist Party (Scotland) MP for Govan
- Robert B. Duncan (1920–2011), U.S. representative from Oregon
- Robert L. Duncan (born 1953), Texas state senator
- Mike Duncan (politician) (Robert Michael Duncan, born 1951), chairman of the Republican National Committee
- Robert M. Duncan Jr. (born 1978), United States attorney and son of Mike Duncan
- Robert M. Duncan (Oregon politician), former president of the Oregon State Senate
- Rob Duncan, mayor of Norwalk, Ohio, who endorsed Jim Renacci in the 2018 United States Senate election in Ohio
- Rob Duncan, councillor of Manor (Trafford electoral ward)

== Science and engineering ==
- Robert C. Duncan (engineer) (1923–2003), American engineer
- Robert C. Duncan (astrophysicist) (born 1955), American astrophysicist
- Robert Duncan (physicist), American physicist

== Sports ==
- Bobby Duncan (footballer, born 1945), Scottish footballer
- Bobby Duncan (footballer, born 2001), English footballer
- Robert C. Duncan (athlete) (1887–1957), British Olympic athlete
- Robert Duncan (footballer) (1891–1984), Australian rules footballer
- Robert Duncan (rower) (born 1931), Australian rower
- Robert Duncan (rugby union) (1896–1981), English international rugby union player
- Rob Duncan of Windsor Lancers Rugby

== Other people ==
- Robert Duncan of Robert Duncan and Company, a shipyard in the Port of Glasgow on the Clyde in Scotland
- Robert Duncan (pilot) (1920–2013), American World War II flying ace
- Robert Morton Duncan (1927–2012), U.S. federal judge
- Robert Duncan (bishop) (born 1948), archbishop of the Anglican Church in North America
- Rob Duncan, former principal of Narre Warren South P-12 College
- Bobby Duncan (disambiguation)

== See also ==
- Bobby Duncum (1944–2026), American professional wrestler and football player
  - his son Bobby Duncum Jr. (1965 – 2000), American professional wrestler
- Rob Duncan Coalson from the University of Pittsburgh
- Robert Duncan Bell (1878–1953), acting governor of Bombay during the British Raj
- Robert Duncan Luce (1925–2012), American mathematician and social scientist
- Robert Duncan MacPherson (born 1944), American mathematician at the Institute for Advanced Study and Princeton University
- Robert Duncan McNeill (born 1964), American director, producer, and actor
- Robert Duncan Milne (1844–1899), San Francisco science fiction writer
- Robert Duncan Sherrington (1902–1966), Australian politician
- Robert Duncan Wilmot (1809–1891), Canadian politician and a Father of Confederation
- Robert Duncan Wilmot Jr. (1837–1920), Canadian farmer, businessman and politician
- Robert Duncanson (disambiguation)
