= Duncanson =

Duncanson may refer to:

- Dewar–Chatt–Duncanson model, organometallic chemistry
- Duncanson (surname), people
- Duncanson-Cranch House, registered historic place in the District of Columbia
