= Bobby Duncan =

Bob or Bobby Duncan may refer to:

- Bobby Duncan (footballer, born 1945), Scottish footballer
- Bobby Duncan (footballer, born 2001), English footballer
- Bob Duncan, a character in Good Luck Charlie

== See also ==
- Bobby Duncum (1944 – 2026), American professional wrestler and football player
  - his son Bobby Duncum Jr. (1965 – 2000), American professional wrestler
- Robert Duncan (disambiguation)
