= Robert Duncanson =

Robert Duncanson may refer to:

- Robert Duncanson (Scots Army officer) (1658–1705), Scottish professional soldier
- Robert S. Duncanson (1821–1872), American painter

== See also ==
- Robert Duncan (disambiguation)
- Duncanson (surname)
