= 2020 United States Postal Service crisis =

Events that caused delays in delivery of mail

The 2020 United States Postal Service crisis was a series of events that caused backlogs and delays in the delivery of mail by the United States Postal Service (USPS). The crisis stems primarily from changes implemented by Postmaster General Louis DeJoy shortly after taking office in June 2020. The delays have had substantial legal, political, economic, and health repercussions.

On August 18, 2020, under heavy political and legal pressure, DeJoy announced that he would be "suspending" the policy changes until after the November 2020 election. He testified to the Senate on August 21, and to the House of Representatives on August 24, concerning the changes and their effects.

Financial relief later arrived as part of the Postal Service Reform Act of 2022, signed by President Joe Biden.

== Background ==
The USPS has had a history of budget deficits dating back to a 2006 law requiring it to prepay retiree health benefits 75 years in advance, a provision to which no other government agency or private corporation is subject. This law, the Postal Accountability and Enhancement Act, was passed during a lame-duck session, and shepherded through the Senate by Senator Susan Collins of Maine. According to Tom Davis (the bill's sponsor), the Bush administration threatened to veto the legislation unless they added the provision regarding funding the employee benefits in advance with the objective of using that money to reduce the federal deficit. The agency's struggles were compounded by the 2008 financial crisis and the Great Recession, which caused overall mail volume to fall by one-third, and again by the COVID-19 pandemic and its economic effects.

== Changes ==
Louis DeJoy was sworn in as postmaster general on June 15, 2020; he is the first person since 1992 to assume the position without any previous experience in the United States Postal Service.

Hundreds of high-speed mail sorting machines were dismantled and removed from postal facilities, raising concerns that mailed ballots for the November 3 election might not reach election offices on time. It was later explained that such machines are taken offline every year in response to diminishing volumes of letter mail, and that 671 of the machines (about 10 percent of the total) in 49 states had been slated for removal this year, 618 of them by August 1. After DeJoy's announcement that he would suspend his changes, the Postal Service's director of maintenance instructed employees that "they are not to reconnect/reinstall machines that have previously been disconnected without approval from HQ Maintenance, no matter what direction they are getting from their plant manager."

Mail collection boxes were removed from the streets in many cities. However, the Postal Service has been removing mail collection boxes as a cost-cutting measure for years — between 1985 and 2011, the number of mail collection boxes was reduced by 60% — so it remains unclear if the removals are connected to DeJoy's changes. After photos of boxes being removed were spread on social media, a Postal Service spokesman said they were being moved to higher-traffic areas but that the removals would stop until after the election.

On August 18, after weeks of heavy criticism and the day after lawsuits against the Postal Service and DeJoy personally were filed in federal court by several individuals, DeJoy announced that he would suspend all the changes until after the November election, "to avoid even the appearance of any impact on election mail." He said he would reinstate overtime hours, roll back service reductions, and halt the removal of mail sorting machines and collection boxes. However, 95 percent of the mail sorting machines that were planned for removal had already been removed, and in testimony to the Senate, DeJoy expressed that he had no intention of replacing them.

== Legal issues ==
Federal law prohibits any employee of the Postal Service from delaying mail. The Postal Service inspector general opened an investigation into the changes made by DeJoy, including any possible conflicts of interest stemming from his $30 million ownership stake in XPO Logistics, which processes mail for the USPS. The subsequent investigation by the USPS Office of Inspector General found that DeJoy had “met all the applicable ethics requirements” related to his investments and as of March 2023, the Federal Election Commission and the FBI closed investigations into him related to campaign contributions.

As of August 18, 2020, attorneys general from at least twenty states filed federal lawsuits against the USPS and DeJoy over potential state election laws violations. One lawsuit is being led by Washington state, joined by Colorado, Connecticut, Illinois, Maryland, Massachusetts, Michigan, Minnesota, New Mexico, Oregon, Rhode Island, Vermont, Virginia, and Wisconsin; a second is being led by Pennsylvania, joined by California, Delaware, Maine, Massachusetts, and North Carolina. All of the participating attorneys general are Democrats. On September 17, 2020, federal judge Stanley Bastian, in response to the lawsuit led by Washington state, issued a temporary injunction barring the Postal Service from proceeding with the planned changes, describing them as "a politically motivated attack on the efficiency of the postal service."

U.S. representative Bill Pascrell requested the New Jersey attorney general to empanel a grand jury to investigate whether any state election laws were violated; the AG declined comment.

A number of individuals, including candidates for public office, have filed lawsuits in federal court against the Postal Service and Donald Trump.

On November 4, 2020, federal judge Emmet G. Sullivan ordered DeJoy to ″sweep″ USPS facilities for undelivered mail-in ballots, and to immediately deliver any they find. DeJoy failed to comply, and Judge Sullivan announced that DeJoy "should" be deposed.

== Political issues ==
The percentage of American voters who vote by mail or absentee ballots more than tripled since 1996, spiking in 2020 during the COVID pandemic.

Voting by mail has become an increasingly common practice in the United States. The share of voters nationwide who submit their ballots by mail has grown from about 8 percent in 1996 to about 21 percent in 2016. Members of the military, their families, and military contractors are able to vote by mail if they are not currently stationed in their permanent home location; more than 600,000 such ballots were cast in the 2016 election. The coronavirus pandemic of 2020 was anticipated to cause a large increase in mail voting because of the possible danger of congregating at polling places. For the 2020 election, a state-by-state analysis concluded that 76 percent of Americans were eligible to vote by mail in 2020, a record number. The analysis predicted that 80 million ballots could be cast by mail in 2020, more than double the number in 2016.

In July 2020 the Postal Service sent letters to 46 U.S. states, warning each state that in anticipation of a sizable increase in postal voting caused by the coronavirus pandemic, the service might not be able to meet that state's deadlines for requesting and casting absentee ballots. In the majority of the letters, the Postal Service encouraged voters to mail their ballots no later than seven days before the general election. These letters were drafted before the implementation of operational changes that caused delays in mail delivery.

Ultimately, a record number of voters, in excess of 65.6 million, would cast postal votes. A March 2021 report from the Postal Service's inspector general found that the vast majority of mail-in ballots and registration materials in the 2020 election were delivered to the relevant authorities on time. The Postal Service handled approximately 135 million pieces of election-related mail between September 1st and November 3rd, delivering 97.9% of ballots from voters to election officials within three days, and 99.89% of ballots within seven days.

== Economic issues ==
Some companies have complained that the delays are hurting their business, since their reputation is dependent on being able to deliver their wares reliably and promptly. A Wisconsin businessman said that with the recent changes, some shipments that might once have been no more than a day late now go missing for weeks, and Priority Mail and Express Mail can now take a week or more. The problems are especially severe for small businesses.

Individuals are also reporting serious economic problems due to delayed or missing mail: not receiving checks or important papers that they are expecting, or having their bill payments arrive at the company late so that they are charged a penalty. In some cities people report getting no mail at all for two or three weeks, and standing in line at the post office to see if it is there.

== Health issues ==
Most prescribed medications from the Veterans Administration are sent by mail. Those medications are supposed to arrive within three to five days of being mailed. Since the operational changes imposed by DeJoy, veterans complain that such prescription deliveries have been delayed, often by weeks. Other health essentials such as oxygen tubes are also reportedly being delayed for weeks. A letter to DeJoy from 31 U.S. senators asked him to reassess the effect of his changes on veterans.

== Postal workers' reactions ==
DeJoy ordered changes with little input from Postal Service workers or their labor unions. In multiple states, postal workers and union leaders reported that the changes resulted in low worker morale.

Some postal workers, aiming to prevent adverse effects on the election and on customer service, resisted the changes ordered by DeJoy. For example, in New York, some mechanics disregarded an order to dismantle and remove a mail-sorting machine; in Michigan, some letter carriers disregarded an order to leave election mail behind; and in Ohio, some postal workers took steps to ensure that delayed prescriptions and benefit payments were delivered. Workers in at least two plants in Washington state reassembled their letter-sorting machines in the week that DeJoy announced he would suspend his changes, despite the Postal Service's national order not to reinstall the machines.

Mark Dimondstein, president of the American Postal Workers Union, criticized the DeJoy orders. Asked in August 2020 whether he believed DeJoy was attempting "to sabotage the election by making cuts that slow down the flow of mail," Dimondstein said: "I can't really judge the motivation. We just have to look at the deeds and the deeds thus far is the new Postmaster General has instituted a number of policies that are truly slowing down mail. The customers see it. We're hearing from customers all over the country. The postal workers see it. Mail is getting backed up."

== Protests ==
The crisis precipitated protests against the changes made by DeJoy, with protesters calling for the postmaster general's resignation. One protest took place on August 15 outside of DeJoy's home in Washington, D.C.; a second took place on August 16 at his home in Greensboro, North Carolina.

== Congressional response ==
On August 16, 2020, Speaker of the House Nancy Pelosi ended a recess of the House of Representatives that had been scheduled to last until the week of September 14, calling lawmakers back to Washington to address the crisis. She proposed an early vote on a bill to roll back the changes introduced by DeJoy, which Democrats have described as "a grave threat to the integrity of the election." Pelosi said that "Lives, livelihoods and the life of our American democracy are under threat from the president."

Senate Minority Leader Chuck Schumer demanded that Majority Leader Mitch McConnell bring the Senate back into session also, to consider ways to "undo the extensive damage Mr. DeJoy has done at the Postal Service," but there was no indication McConnell would do so. Some Republican senators have also called for reversing the changes, pointing out the importance of the Postal Service to rural residents; they include both senators from Montana and Senator Susan Collins of Maine.

On August 17, 2020, DeJoy agreed to testify before the House Committee on Oversight and Reform on August 24, and the next day he agreed to testify before the Senate Committee on Homeland Security and Government Affairs on August 21. USPS Board of Governors chairman Mike Duncan also agreed to testify at the House hearing.

Despite DeJoy's announcement that he would be suspending the operational changes until after the election, Pelosi stated that she did not trust DeJoy, and called the suspension "a necessary but insufficient step in ending the president’s election sabotage campaign."

On August 21, 2020, DeJoy testified before the U.S. Senate that he votes by mail. He committed to senators at the Senate Homeland Security and Governmental Affairs Committee that voters should be "extremely highly confident" that even mail-in ballots sent close to Election Day would be delivered on time, and promised that the USPS would respect its "sacred duty" to deliver election mail in the fall of 2020. Senator Jacky Rosen asked DeJoy to provide the sources of data collected, data analyses, and considerations of consequences—specifically on veterans dependent on the mail for their prescriptions—that DeJoy had undertaken before implementing the removal of mail sorting machines, "reduction, elimination of overtime and late trips". He said he was unable to do so.

On August 22, 2020, the House passed a bill approving $25 billion in emergency funding for the USPS that would reverse DeJoy's changes and ban mail delays before the election. The vote was 257-150 as Democrats approved it unanimously and 26 Republicans joined them. The White House threatened a veto. The bill was introduced in the Senate by Susan Collins, but never reached the floor for a vote.

Congresswoman Debbie Wasserman Schultz, a member of the House Committee on Oversight and Reform, was denied access to two post offices in Florida when she tried to conduct an inspection on September 3. The United States Postal Service cited possible Hatch Act violations and internal ethics guidelines that stipulate any candidate for political office cannot tour a post office within 45 days of an election as its reasons for turning Wasserman Schultz away.

== Holiday shipping delays ==
In December 2020, a combination of the cost-cutting measures instituted by Postmaster General Louis DeJoy and increased holiday season shipping volume resulted in widespread package shipping delays and "buckling" of the Postal system. USPS facilities became overwhelmed with packages: A supervisor at an Indianapolis distribution center reported that for the sake of expediency, workers were "just throwing [packages] in the trucks without scanning them" into the system; in Allentown, Pennsylvania, mail pieces sat in the parking lot because there was no room to unload them, and a clerk in Philadelphia told the Philadelphia Inquirer, "Don’t be using the post office right now, because we can’t deliver the mail". In an interview with the Baltimore Sun, a postal clerk in Linthicum, Maryland, summed up the situation as a “logistical nightmare," and added that USPS should have known based on the events of the preceding year there would be a holiday shipping crisis, but despite this failed to warn customers. A postal worker who anonymously spoke to the Washington Post summed it up, "“As bad as you think it is, it’s worse.” Late in December, USPS acknowledged the delays on its website citing COVID-19 issues and a labor shortage and encouraging early mailing of packages, but for many with packages already trapped at distribution centers across the country it was expected to be too late to make a difference.

== See also ==
- Postal voting in the 2020 United States elections
