= Ron Stroman =

American attorney

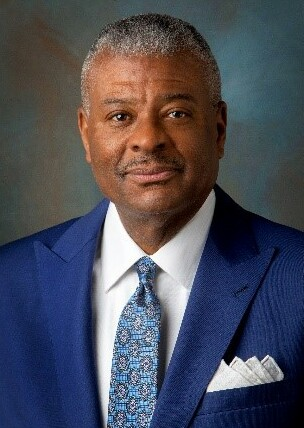

Governor of the United States Postal Service
- Incumbent
- Assumed office June 15, 2021
- Appointed by: Joe Biden
- Preceded by: Ellen Williams

Deputy Postmaster General of the United States Postal Service
- In office March 28, 2011 – June 1, 2020
- President: Barack Obama; Donald Trump
- Preceded by: Patrick R. Donahoe
- Succeeded by: Douglas Tulino

Personal details
- Party: Democratic
- Education: Manhattan College (BA); Rutgers University–Newark (JD)

Ron Stroman is an American attorney who has been serving as a Governor of the Board of Governors of the United States Postal Service since 2021. He previously served as deputy postmaster general of the United States Postal Service from 2011 to 2020.

== Education ==
Stroman received his bachelor’s degree from Manhattan College and a Juris Doctor from Rutgers Law School.

== Career ==
Stroman has served as staff director and minority staff director for the United States House Committee on Oversight and Reform. He was a staff member on the U.S. House Committee on Government Operations, and counsel for the U.S House Judiciary Committee. Stroman has also previously worked in an executive role at the United States Department of Transportation and as an attorney with the United States Department of Housing and Urban Development.

On March 28, 2011, Stroman assumed office as deputy postmaster general. He resigned on June 1, 2020.

=== Biden administration ===
On November 10, 2020, Stroman was named part of President-elect Biden's transition team for the United States Postal Service.

On February 24, 2021, President Joe Biden announced his intent to nominate Stroman to serve as a Governor of the Board of Governors of the United States Postal Service. Stroman was one of three nominees, along with Anton Hajjar and Amber McReynolds. He is one of two men of color and the appointments would also create a Democratic majority. On March 15, 2021, his nomination was sent to the Senate. President Biden nominated Stroman to the seat vacated by Ellen Williams.

On May 12, 2021, Stroman was confirmed to a term as governor expiring December 8, 2021 in a 69-30 vote. The Senate later confirmed a separate nomination for him to serve a term as governor expiring December 8, 2028. On June 15, 2021, he was sworn into office by Susan Rice.
