= Senator Barnett =

Senator Barnett may refer to:

- Guy Barnett (Australian politician) (born 1962), Senate of Australia
- James Barnett (New York politician) (1810–1874), New York State Senate
- Jim Barnett (Kansas politician) (born 1955), Kansas State Senate
- Juan Barnett (born 1970), Mississippi State Senate (2016-2026)
- Mickey D. Barnett, New Mexico State Senate
- William Barnett (Georgia politician) (1761–1832), Georgia State Senate
