= Stroman =

Stroman is the last name of:

- Greg Stroman (born 1996), American football player
- Jalen Stroman (born 2003), American football player
- Larry Stroman, American comic book artist and writer
- Marcus Stroman (born 1991), American baseball pitcher for the New York Yankees
- Mark Anthony Stroman (1969–2011), American spree killer
- Ron Stroman, American attorney
- Susan Stroman (born 1954), American theatre director, choreographer, film director, and performer
