= Ron Bloom =

American government official (born 1955)

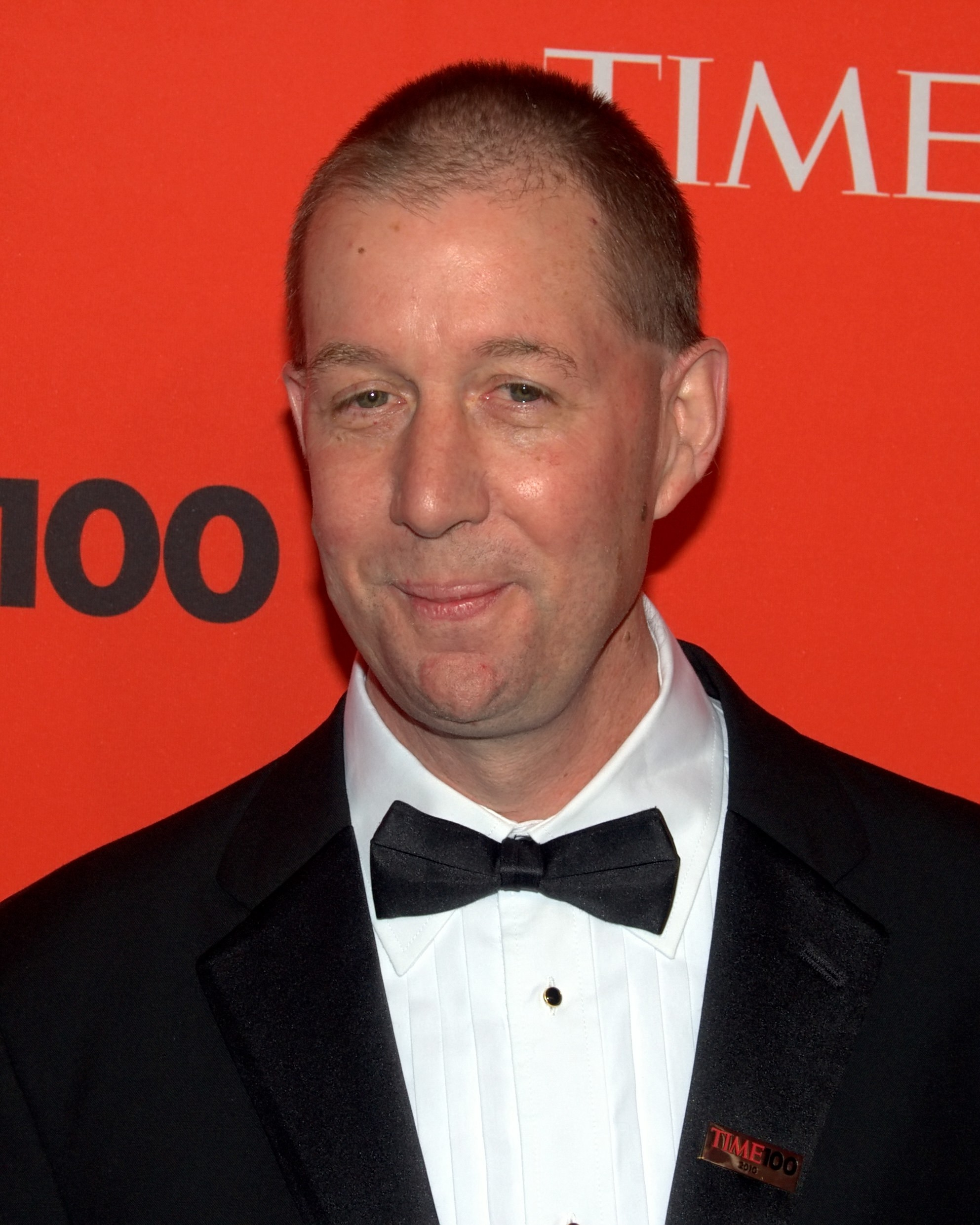

Chairman of the Board of Governors of the United States Postal Service
- In office February 9, 2021 – December 8, 2021
- President: Joe Biden
- Preceded by: Mike Duncan
- Succeeded by: Roman Martinez IV

Governor of the United States Postal Service
- In office August 20, 2019 – December 8, 2021
- President: Donald Trump; Joe Biden
- Preceded by: Mickey D. Barnett
- Succeeded by: Dan Tangherlini

Senior Counselor to the President for Manufacturing Policy
- In office 2009–2011
- President: Barack Obama

Personal details
- Born: 1955 (age 70–71)
- Party: Democratic
- Education: Wesleyan University (BA); Harvard University (MBA)

Ron Bloom (born 1955) is an American economic advisor who served as a senior official in the Obama Administration from February 2009 to August 2011. This included working as the Assistant to the President for Manufacturing Policy between February 2011 and August 2011, in the Department of the Treasury as a senior advisor to the Secretary of the Treasury, as a member of the President's Task Force on the Automotive Industry, and as senior counselor to the president for manufacturing policy. From 1996 to 2008, Bloom served as special assistant to the president of the United Steelworkers. Bloom also worked for the investment banking firm Lazard on two occasions, the second as Vice Chairman, U.S Investment Banking. Bloom is the vice chair and a managing partner of Brookfield Asset Management and served as chairman of the Board of Governors of the United States Postal Service.

== Early life and education ==
Ron Bloom was born to a Jewish family in New York City and raised in Swarthmore, Pennsylvania. His mother, Paula Yackira, was an educator, and his father, Joel Bloom, served 21 years as President of the Franklin Institute Science Museum. The elder Bloom was a prime mover in the conception and development of the Mandell Futures Center, a 90,000-square-foot (8,400 m^{2}) wing that transformed the institute “from a dusty bin of outmoded exhibits into what is probably the most advanced science museum in the world.” A co-author of the influential ‘’Museums for a New Century: A Report of the Commission on Museums for a New Century’’, he was a president of the American Alliance of Museums (the first science museum president to serve in that capacity), chairman of the U.S. National Committee of the International Council of Museums, and founding president of the Association of Science-Technology Centers. In 1993, the American Alliance of Museums presented him with its Award for Distinguished Service to Museums; and in 2002, the Franklin dedicated its renovated observatory as the Joel N. Bloom Observatory.

After graduating from Wesleyan University in 1977, the younger Bloom went to work first for the Jewish Labor Committee and a year later for the Service Employees International Union. After a time, however, he realized that labor unions suffered from a lack of business knowledge, so he enrolled at Harvard Business School, earning an MBA with Distinction in 1985.

== Career ==
=== Lazard ===
Upon graduation from HBS, Bloom joined the investment banking firm of Lazard Frères & Co. At Lazard, he divided his time between mergers and acquisition, the firm's principal business, and working with unions whose members were involved in corporate bankruptcies and restructuring transactions, a practice originated by Lazard partner Eugene Keilin. Many of the employee-related transactions involved the steel industry—whose hourly employees were represented by the United Steelworkers (USW)—and the airline industry, where Lazard represented pilots who were members of the Airline Pilots Association (ALPA).

=== Keilin and Bloom ===
In 1990, Bloom joined Keilin to create their own investment banking firm, Keilin and Bloom, which specialized in representing unions and other employee groups in turnaround and restructuring situations. Representing the USW in the Canadian bankruptcy of Algoma Steel, Bloom avoided a liquidation of the company and succeeded in obtaining majority ownership for the employees in the reorganized company.

Continuing a project they began together at Lazard, Keilin and Bloom also represented the ALPA pilots at United Airlines in their attempts to acquire ownership of the company through an employee stock ownership plan. In 1994, they succeeded in obtaining a majority stake in United for the ESOP, creating one of the largest employee-owned companies in the United States.

=== Steelworkers ===
In 1996, Bloom left the firm to become Special Assistant to George Becker, the President of the USW. His duties included helping the union affect corporate business restructuring, investments, bankruptcies and mergers. In his time with the Steelworkers, he reinforced his reputation as both a fierce negotiator and a creative problem solver, helping shepherd the steel industry through a painful transition period.

Bloom's work on behalf of the Steelworkers has been documented by major news publications, including the Wall Street Journal and BusinessWeek. Three examples of transactions in which he played a major role are described briefly below.

==== LTV, Bethlehem, and ISG ====
In April 2002 and February 2003 respectively, Bloom facilitated the sale of the assets of LTV Steel and Bethlehem Steel to the International Steel Group (ISG). Led by the financier Wilbur L. Ross Jr., ISG sought to acquire the assets of LTV and Bethlehem out of bankruptcies without having to assume expensive obligations to former workers. Bloom negotiated a Voluntary Employee Beneficiary Association (VEBA) that would finance health care for retirees using a portion of ISG's profits. Describing his dealings with Bloom, Ross said, “I found him first of all very, very pragmatic, not overly ideological,” and “a very, very good negotiator.”

==== Goodyear ====
In September 2003, Bloom led contract negotiations with Goodyear Tire, where the USW represented 19,000 active employees and more than 40,000 retirees. The company's management believed rising costs required that they replace several U.S. factories with new facilities in Asia, but the USW proposed an alternative that entailed major changes to Goodyear's long-term business plan. Ultimately, Bloom negotiated an agreement that included concessions in exchange for limits on executive salaries, agreements to restructure the company's debt and invest in U.S. factories, and the right of the union to nominate someone to sit on the company's Board of Directors. The USW avoided significant layoffs, and Jonathan Rich, a senior Goodyear executive, said, “We got what we needed” to become competitive again.

==== Wheeling-Pitt ====
In 2006, the Brazilian steel company Companhia Siderúrgica Nacional (CSN) tried to merge with Wheeling-Pittsburgh Corporation (Wheeling-Pitt), a transaction that would have cost a significant number of U.S. jobs. The Steelworkers were opposed to the deal, so Bloom orchestrated a hostile takeover by Esmark, a Chicago-based steel-distribution company, to keep Wheeling-Pitt out of CSN's hands and avoid layoffs.

=== Obama administration ===
==== Auto industry ====
In February 2009, Bloom was named Senior Advisor to the Secretary of the Treasury on the President's Task Force on the Automotive Industry. As the deputy to Steve Rattner (who led the Auto Team at Treasury), he helped manage the process that led to the reorganization of General Motors and Chrysler. An experienced dealmaker, he played a key role in extracting concessions from the companies, their lenders and other creditors, and the United Auto Workers (UAW).

Bloom was particularly central to the Chrysler negotiations, where his strategy emphasized shared sacrifice to maximize value for all parties. He convinced the UAW, whose principal interest was preserving jobs, to accept painful wage-and-benefit concessions. In return, a VEBA for UAW members would receive a significant equity stake in the reorganized company. The announcement of that agreement put pressure on Chrysler's creditors to forgive a significant portion of their loans. With those commitments sealed, the Treasury agreed to provide the necessary financing to set the company back on its feet.

When Rattner left the government, shortly after GM emerged from bankruptcy in August 2009, Bloom took over the responsibility of “monitoring [the auto] industry and protecting the substantial investment the American taxpayers have made” in GM and Chrysler.

On April 21, 2010, GM paid back its outstanding loan from the U.S. government. The remaining Treasury stake in GM consists of $2.1 billion in preferred stock and 60.8 percent of the common equity. Bloom has said that this remaining taxpayer interest in the company will be disposed of “as soon as practicable.”

==== Manufacturing policy ====
On Labor Day, 2009 (September 7), President Obama formally introduced Bloom as the Administration's Senior Counselor for Manufacturing Policy. He was charged with “working closely with the National Economic Council [to] provide leadership on policy development and strategic planning for the President’s agenda to revitalize the manufacturing sector.”

In this capacity, he was instrumental in the formulation of the Administration's Framework for Revitalizing Manufacturing (released on December 16, 2009). The Framework underlines the critical role manufacturing plays in the U.S. economy and in the fabric of American life; it outlines the major factors that have contributed to the significant difficulties facing American manufacturers; and it describes the Administration's efforts to address each of these factors and revitalize the manufacturing sector.

From February to August 2011, Ron Bloom served as the Assistant to the President for Manufacturing Policy at the White House. During this time, Bloom played a key role in the agreement between the federal government and leading automakers to raise light-duty vehicle fuel economy standards to 54.5 miles per gallon by 2025. The White House has estimated that these standards will save consumers $1.7 trillion and reduce oil consumption by an estimated 12 billion barrels. Bloom also oversaw the launch of the Advanced Manufacturing Partnership, an initiative between industry, universities, and the federal government designed to invest in the emerging technologies that will make U.S. manufacturers more economically competitive.

The New York Times reported that Chrysler paid back its rescue loans on May 24, 2011, a comeback which Bloom described as “more quickly than we had hoped.”

Bloom also led the U.S. Treasury Department’s team that oversaw the Initial Public Offering of GM, which was the largest initial stock offering in U.S. history at the time.

=== Later career ===
==== Return to Lazard ====
In February 2012, Ron Bloom rejoined Lazard, first as a senior advisor and then as Vice Chairman, U.S. Investment Banking. Upon the announcement of his return, The New York Times reported that Bloom “said his primary focus remained working with industrial companies as they seek to expand in the United States.”

==== National Association of Letter Carriers (NALC) ====
On October 16, 2011, The New York Times reported, "the National Association of Letter Carriers announced that it had hired Mr. Bloom and Lazard, the financial advisory and asset management firm, to develop a strategy to revitalize the deficit-laden [U.S.] postal service", currently facing a deficit of nearly $10 billion. The union hired Mr. Bloom to help expand and explore possible solutions needed to address the service's immediate fiscal crisis as well as a range of long-term business strategies. The national president of the union, Fredric V. Rolando, commented about Bloom and Lazard: "They have experience in analyzing large, financially complex institutions and crafting creative solutions."

A January 22, 2013 article in Esquire noted that Bloom recommended against weakening the network by slowing down the mail and cutting Saturday service. During Bloom’s representation of the NALC at Lazard, the firm published a white paper recommending ways the USPS could grow its parcel services and stimulate new business by increasing delivery of packages ordered online. The white paper also noted, “a successful restructuring of the Postal Service must start with a plan to better leverage its unrivaled last-mile delivery network — a retail network that touches every city, town and neighborhood in America. Instead of focusing on shrinking its network and capabilities, thereby yielding its competitive advantage, the Postal Service needs an ambitious rethinking of its business model.”

==== Detroit Public Sector Retirees ====
On September 19, 2013, Bloom and Lazard were hired to advise a committee representing Detroit’s 23,500 public sector retirees during Detroit’s Chapter 9 Bankruptcy restructuring. Retirees faced cuts to their healthcare and pension benefits during the restructuring, but Bloom assisted in negotiating a deal that Detroit retirees eventually supported. In December 2014, the city emerged from what The Detroit News called “an unprecedented restructuring” while the former Michigan Governor called it a “historic” and “outstanding outcome, far better than people’s expectations.”

==== Chrysler-Fiat Sale ====
Bloomberg reported on September 20, 2013 that Fiat SpA Chief Executive Officer Sergio Marchionne hired Bloom to advise on the acquisition of Chrysler Group LLC and negotiate a deal with the United Auto Workers’ retiree health-care trust. Fiat assumed full ownership of Chrysler after a deal was finalized in January 2014.

==== Brookfield Asset Management ====
In 2016, Bloom joined Brookfield Asset Management as a vice chairman and a managing partner to help manage the firm’s private equity operations. In a March 27, 2019 Bloomberg article, Bloom characterized the firm’s nontraditional culture of collaboration, saying “It’s the opposite of an eat-what-you-kill mentality [ . . . ] Collaboration is the norm. People who aren’t willing to work collaboratively just don’t like it.”

In 2020, Brookfield announced that Bloom would be leading the firm’s $5 billion Retail Revitalization Program, a fund devoted to helping retailers recover from the impact of the COVID-19 pandemic.

=== USPS Board of Governors ===
On August 1, 2019, the U.S. Senate approved President Donald Trump’s nomination of Mr. Bloom to the USPS Board of Governors. Bloom began his service on August 20, 2019 and was chair of the Board's Strategy and Innovation Committee. Bloom also sat on an Election Mail Committee to oversee the mail-in voting process during the 2020 U.S. General Elections.

On February 9, 2021, Ron Bloom was unanimously elected by fellow Governors to serve as the 24th Chairman of the Board of Governors.

On November 19, 2021, it was announced that President Joe Biden intended to replace Ron Bloom along with fellow Governor John Barger, nominating Daniel Tangherlini and Derek Kan to fill their seats.

== Public image ==
Bloom has been praised for his role in the Auto Industry restructurings and for his work as Senior Counselor for Manufacturing Policy. On April 29, 2010, he was named as one of Time Magazine’s 100 Most Influential People in the World (in the category of World Leaders). In the Time 100 issue, Bill Saporito wrote that “his role in brokering the rescue of General Motors and Chrysler while preserving more than 100,000 jobs demanded a synergist who could work both sides of the equation with authority and respect.”

In March 2009, when Bloom was one of the leaders of the Presidential Task Force on the Auto Industry, Mike Psaros (managing partner of KPS Capital Partners) said: “[Bloom] always tells the truth … He tells people objective facts they don’t want to hear.” Psaros added: “He will tell the management of these companies, he will tell the (union), and he will tell the debt holders and stockholders that there won’t be any quick fixes, that this is a one-time and unique opportunity with the government’s help to fix these companies.” Brookings Institution analyst Darrell West said: “[Bloom] is a team player who will help build consensus.” Then-president of the United Steelworkers, Leo Gerard, said “[Bloom] is very direct and can dismantle a lousy business plan in minutes. … He can explain that to a CEO as well as a brand new (union) member.” Wilbur Ross of International Auto Components Group said: “[Bloom] has an extremely good understanding of the economics of business.”

When Bloom left the Obama White House in August 2011, he was praised for his work at the time. Bob Ferguson, head of Global Policy at General Motors, said: “Bloom’s leadership within the President’s Auto Task Force helped America’s auto industry steer toward the road to recovery. As a result, the prospects look bright for auto manufacturing to contribute towards jobs and a stronger economy for years to come.”

The Detroit News and a book by Bloom's boss Steven Rattner claimed that at the Auto Task Force's farewell dinner in July 2009, Bloom said of his government service: "I did this all for the unions." In testimony under oath before Congress, Bloom denied making the statement at all, even in jest.

In October 2009, political commentators focused on comments made by Bloom in 2008, namely: "We know that the free market is nonsense. ...We kind of agree with Mao that political power comes largely from the barrel of a gun." While conservatives Glenn Beck, Rush Limbaugh, and others juxtaposed Bloom's comments with details of Mao's violent dictatorship, progressive groups such as MediaMatters cited instances where conservatives had quoted Mao and where Republican campaign operative Stephen Shadegg claimed to have "followed the advice of Mao" in the 1960s.

Bloom's efforts toward automobile dealership closures was criticized for including "completely arbitrary factors";

- The New Republic Magazine: “Bloom…managed the negotiation that plucked Chrysler from its deathbed and married it off to Fiat, making him perhaps the most successful yenta in corporate history.”
- President Obama: “Distinguished by his extraordinary service on the Auto Task Force and his extensive experience with both business and labor, Ron has the knowledge and experience necessary to lead the way in creating the good-paying manufacturing jobs of the future.”
- An anonymous Obama Administration official, describing Bloom's role in the Chrysler restructuring: “Ron has been the quiet force that relentlessly and aggressively knocked people's heads together."
- Matthew Feldman, lead bankruptcy attorney for the Treasury Auto Team: “In the course of the Chrysler negotiations, Ron maneuvered so that he was the fulcrum of it all. There were a lot of counterparties—United Auto Workers, Chrysler, the Canadians, GMAC—and they all sort of felt like when they hit a wall in bilaterial relations, they could go to Ron and he would find a workaround. Without him, I don’t think the Chrysler negotiations would have happened. People naturally looked to him as the person who can solve problems.”

== See also ==
- Effects of the 2008-2009 automotive industry crisis on the United States
