= James Bilbray =

American politician and lawyer (1938–2021)

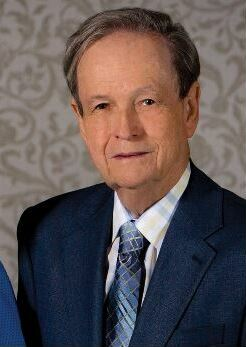

Acting Chair of the Board of Governors of the United States Postal Service
- In office December 2014 – December 8, 2016
- President: Barack Obama
- Postmaster General: Megan Brennan
- Preceded by: Mickey D. Barnett

Vice Chair of the Board of Governors of the United States Postal Service
- In office 2012 – December 2014
- President: Barack Obama
- Postmaster General: Megan Brennan
- Preceded by: Mickey D. Barnett

Member of the Board of Governors of the United States Postal Service
- In office 2006 – December 8, 2016
- President: George W. Bush; Barack Obama
- Postmaster General: John E. Potter; Patrick R. Donahoe; Megan Brennan
- Preceded by: John F. Walsh
- Succeeded by: William D. Zollars

Member of the Defense Base Realignment and Closure Commission
- In office 2005–2006
- President: George W. Bush
- Secretary: Donald Rumsfeld; Robert Gates

Member of the U.S. House of Representatives from Nevada's 1st district
- In office January 3, 1987 – January 3, 1995
- Preceded by: Harry Reid
- Succeeded by: John Ensign

Member of the Nevada Senate from the Clark County district
- In office January 1981 – January 1987
- Preceded by: Multi-member district
- Succeeded by: Multi-member district

Personal details
- Born: James Hubert Bilbray; May 19, 1938 Las Vegas, Nevada, U.S.
- Died: September 19, 2021 (aged 83)
- Party: Democratic
- Spouse: Michaelene Bilbray
- Relations: Brian Bilbray (cousin)
- Children: 4, including Shannon Bilbray-Axelrod
- Education: American University (BA, JD)

Military service
- Branch/service: United States Army
- Years of service: 1955–1956; 1957–1963 (reserve)
- Unit: United States Army Reserve; Nevada Army National Guard

James Hubert Bilbray (May 19, 1938 – September 19, 2021) was an American politician, lawyer, and postal executive who served four terms as the U.S. representative for Nevada's 1st congressional district from 1987 to 1995. He was a member of the Democratic Party.

== Early life and education ==
Born in Las Vegas in 1938, Bilbray graduated from Las Vegas High School and attended the University of Nevada, Las Vegas, from 1959 to 1960. He received a Bachelor of Arts in government and public administration from American University in Washington, D.C., in 1962 and a Juris Doctor from the Washington College of Law in 1964. He served in the Nevada Army National Guard from 1955 to 1956 and in the United States Army Reserve from 1957 to 1963.

== Career ==
Bilbray practiced law and was deputy district attorney of Clark County from 1965 to 1967. He was then chief legal counsel in the Clark County juvenile court from 1967 to 1968 and was an alternate municipal judge in Las Vegas from 1978 to 1980. He became licensed to practice law before the Nevada Gaming Commission and the Nevada Gaming Control Board in 1970.

A Democrat, he ran for the United States House of Representatives in 1972 against conservative incumbent Walter Baring, a fellow Democrat who was disliked by his party's establishment. Bilbray won the primary and was expected to win the general election, but Baring surprised him by endorsing the Republican nominee, David Towell, who upset Bilbray in a close race. Bilbray made a comeback in 1980 when he was elected to the Nevada State Senate, where he served from 1981 to 1987, and also became chairman of the Taxation Committee and a member of the Judiciary Committee.

=== Congress ===
He successfully ran for the U.S. House of Representatives in 1986 for the seat being vacated by Harry Reid, who made a successful run for the U.S. Senate in the same election. He served as chairman of the Small Business Subcommittee on Taxation, Tourism and Procurement and was also a member of the Foreign Affairs, Armed Services and Intelligence committees.

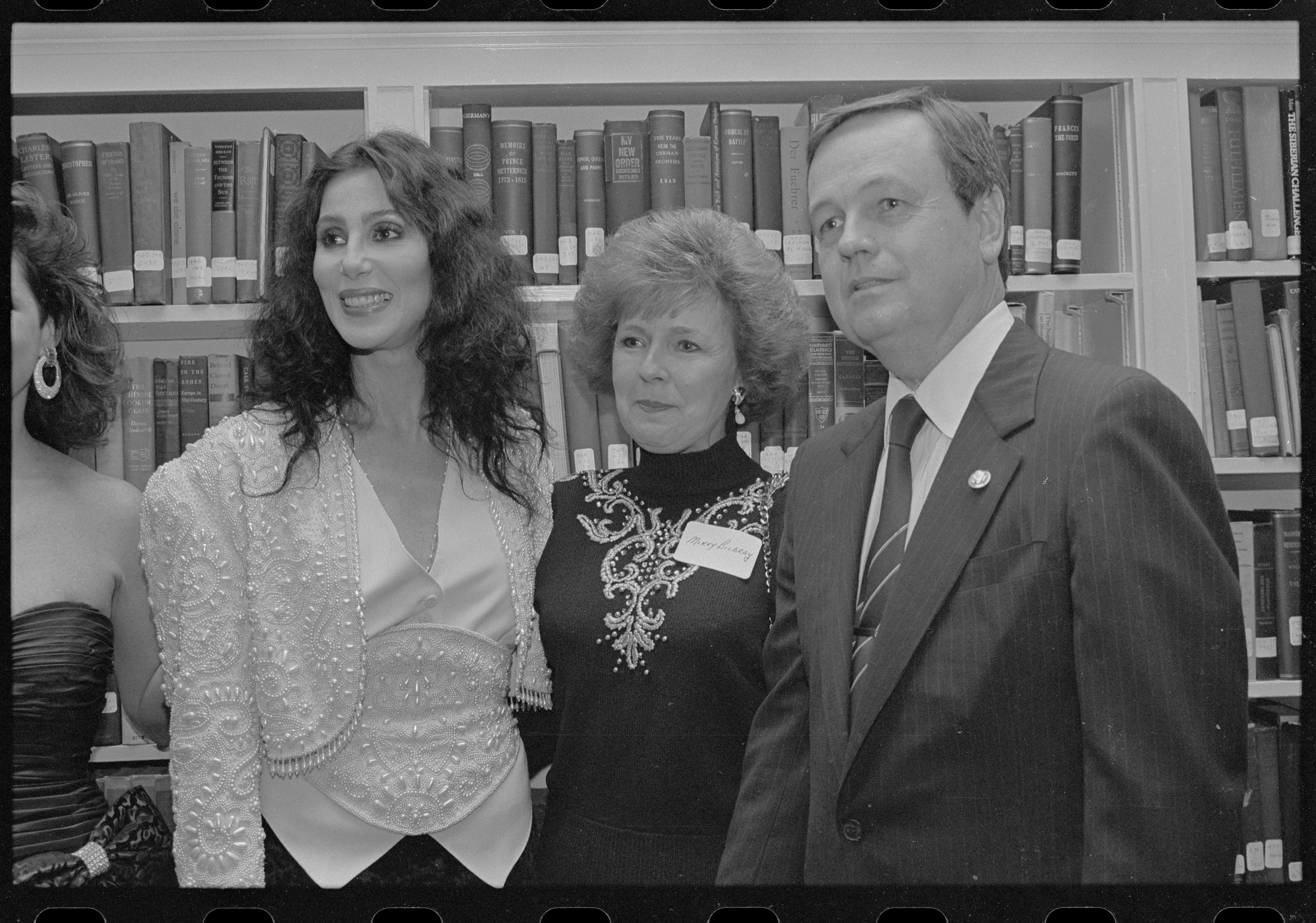
Bilbray and his wife with singer Cher in 1990.

Bilbray lost his re-election campaign in the 1994 Republican Revolution, losing to Republican opponent John Ensign by less than 1,400 votes. Bilbray appeared to be well on his way to reelection until news surfaced that reports surfaced that one of his aides stood to make a huge profit from lands legislation sponsored by Bilbray.

=== Later career ===
After leaving Congress, Bilbray joined the law firm of Kummer, Kaempfer, Bonner and Renshaw as Of Counsel in 1996 where he has specialized in dealing with local, state and federal issues. In 2001, he received an honorary doctorate of laws from the University of Nevada, Las Vegas for his work in state and federal government. He was appointed a commissioner on the 2005 Base Realignment and Closure Commission and in 2006 was appointed a member of the Board of Governors of the United States Postal Service by President George W. Bush for a term ending in 2015. He resided in Las Vegas until his death in 2021.

== Death and legacy ==
He died on September 19, 2021.

James H. Bilbray Elementary School in Las Vegas is named in his honor.

== Personal life ==
Bilbray and his wife Michaelene had three daughters: Bridget Bilbray Phillips who was the first principal of James H. Bilbray Elementary School, Erin Bilbray-Kohn who unsuccessfully ran for U.S. House in Nevada's 3rd district in 2014, and Shannon Bilbray-Axelrod, a member of the Nevada Assembly since 2017. They also had one son, Kevin. He was a cousin to Brian Bilbray, a two-time Republican congressman from Southern California. Bilbray died on September 19, 2021, at the age of 83.

== Electoral history ==
1986 election
Party	Candidate	Votes	%
Democratic	James Bilbray	61,830	54.09
Republican	Bob Ryan	59,433	44.04
Libertarian	Gordon Michael Morris	2,145	1.88
Total votes		114,317	100.0
Democratic hold			

1988 election
Party	Candidate	Votes	%
Democratic	James Bilbray (Incumbent)	101,764	63.97
Republican	Lucille Lusk	53,588	33.69
Libertarian	Patrick O'Neill	3,724	2.34
Total votes		159,076	100.0
Democratic hold			

1990 election
Party	Candidate	Votes	%
Democratic	James Bilbray (Incumbent)	84,650	61.41
Republican	Bob Dickinson	47,377	34.37
Libertarian	William Moore	5,825	4.23
Total votes		137,852	100.0
Democratic hold			

1992 election
Party	Candidate	Votes	%
Democratic	James Bilbray (Incumbent)	128,178	57.87
Republican	J. Coy Pettyjohn	84,217	38.02
Libertarian	Scott A. Kjar	8,993	4.06
Total votes		221,488	100.0
Democratic hold			

1994 election
Party	Candidate	Votes	%
Republican	John Ensign	73,769	48.48
Democratic	James Bilbray (Incumbent)	72,333	47.54
Libertarian	Gary Wood	6,065	3.99
Total votes		152,167	100.0
Republican gain from Democratic			

U.S. House of Representatives
Preceded by Harry Reid	Member of the U.S. House of Representatives from Nevada's 1st congressional district January 3, 1987 – January 3, 1995	Succeeded by John Ensign
