= Dinsmore & Shohl =

U.S. law firm

Dinsmore & Shohl LLP
- Headquarters: Cincinnati, Ohio
- No. of offices: 30
- No. of attorneys: 750+ (2023)
- Major practice areas: General practice
- Key people: Joshua A. Lorentz, Managing Partner and Chairman of the Board of Directors
- Date founded: 1908
- Founder: Frank F. Dinsmore (1868-1962); Walter M. Shohl (1886-1970)
- Company type: Limited liability partnership
- Website: www.dinsmore.com

Dinsmore is a large U.S. law firm with a lead administrative office in Cincinnati, Ohio. It is an AmLaw 200 and National Law Journal 250 firm, and has been named to the U.S. News & World Report and Best Lawyers Best Law Firm lists. The firm consists of more than 750 attorneys practicing in 30 cities throughout California, Colorado, Connecticut, Florida, Georgia, Illinois, Indiana, Kentucky, Massachusetts, Michigan, Ohio, Pennsylvania, Texas, West Virginia and Washington D.C.

Joshua Lorentz is managing partner.

== History ==
=== Founding years ===
Dinsmore & Shohl LLP was founded in 1908 by Frank F. Dinsmore. Mr. Dinsmore grew up in Portsmouth, Ohio and was a 1891 graduate of Cincinnati Law School (now known as Donald P. Klekamp College of Law). Mr. Dinsmore opened a private practice in 1908, and in 1912 he invited Walter M. Shohl, a graduate of Harvard Law School to join the firm. The new partnership for the practice of law under the firm name of Dinsmore & Shohl was announced on February 1, 1912.

=== Cox trials ===
The partners took a leading role in two of the most sensational trials in Cincinnati history: the criminal trials of George B. Cox for violation of state banking laws. In the country's notorious era of "bossism," Cox controlled 25,000 votes in Cincinnati, one of America's largest cities at the time. Historians claim that "no one in Cincinnati could hope to hold office without Cox's approval - even presidents vied for his approval." The state of Ohio charged Cox and 10 other former directors and officials of Cox's defunct bank, the Cincinnati Trust Co., with willful misapplication of bank funds and other charges. In two trials during the summer of 1913, Dinsmore and Shohl won acquittals for Cox on all charges.

=== Savings and loan crisis ===
Seventy three years after the Cox trials, the firm ended up on the other side of Ohio's misapplication of bank funds statute. The firm's lawyers took the lead in prosecuting the criminal trial following the collapse of Home State Savings Bank of Cincinnati in the great savings and loan crisis. Ohio Attorney General Anthony Celebrezze, Jr. appointed Lawrence Kane as special prosecutor to convene a grand jury and investigate the Home State collapse. Kane and a team of the firm's lawyers successfully prosecuted the criminal charges in what was, at that time, the longest criminal trial in Hamilton County history, stretching from November 1986 to March 1987. Local financier Marvin Warner, a former Ambassador to Switzerland, was among those found guilty and sent to prison.

=== Wright aeronautical plant ===
Just prior to World War II, the firm handled a top-secret matter for the government: the siting of the Wright Aeronautical Plant on what is now General Electric in Evendale, Ohio. This facility would employ 20,000 by 1942 and manufacture the aircraft engines responsible for much of the bombing during the war. Dinsmore & Shohl attorneys handled the massive title work involving hundreds of parcels, all in total secrecy.

=== Expansion ===
After the war, the firm expanded in a number of areas, including litigation and liability. Massive wage hour litigation was handled in Milan, Tennessee, for the Procter & Gamble Defense Corporation. The firm managed National Labor Relations Act cases for Procter & Gamble, as well as early product liability cases.

Dinsmore also broadened its reach as Procter & Gamble expanded into foreign markets. Attorneys formed companies throughout the world, providing an essential support to the establishment of Procter & Gamble's vast international business in the 1950s through the 1970s. As legal practices became increasingly specialized during this same period, the firm's experience with Procter & Gamble helped its own business, transactional, tax and real estate practice areas. In 2006, for example, the firm represented long-time client Bob Castellini in his acquisition of the Cincinnati Reds from financier Carl Lindner.

In the 1980s, the firm expanded into tort litigation, starting with the Rely (brand) tampons, Toxic Shock Syndrome cases for Procter & Gamble and the Bendectin birth defect cases for Merrell Dow Pharmaceuticals. During this period, the firm also handled insurance coverage work for Liberty Mutual Insurance Company. Additional work involved Dow Corning breast implants, the diet drug Fen-phen, Brown & Williamson tobacco and popcorn flavoring.

The firm continues to serve a large number of companies, from Fortune 500 international conglomerates to small businesses, non-profit organizations and entrepreneurs.

== Growth ==
=== Offices ===
The firm first ventured beyond Cincinnati when it opened an office in the neighboring Clermont County in 1979. In 1987, offices were opened in Dayton and Columbus, Ohio. In the late 1990s, Dinsmore & Shohl expanded into Louisville and Lexington, Kentucky. In 2002, offices were established in Pittsburgh, Pennsylvania and Charleston, West Virginia. Two more West Virginia locations Morgantown and Wheeling were added in 2007. In 2009, a third office was opened in Kentucky in the state capital of Frankfort. On July 22, 2011, Dinsmore & Shohl announced the opening of an office in Washington, D.C. In late January 2012, the firm opened an office in Philadelphia, becoming their 14th office and second location in Pennsylvania.

=== Mergers ===
Several mergers have helped fuel Dinsmore & Shohl's growth. In 2003, the law firm of Killworth, Gottman, Hagan & Schaeff LLP, headquartered in Dayton, Ohio was merged with Dinsmore, significantly expanding the firm's intellectual property practice. In 2008, Dinsmore added to its corporate and tax practices through a merger with Chernesky, Heyman & Kress, P.L.L., also located in Dayton. In 2009, Woodward, Hobson & Fulton, L.L.P. merged with Dinsmore & Shohl, expanding the firm's presence in Kentucky. In 2014, Dinsmore completed a merger with Peck Shaffer & Williams LLP, a nationally recognized bond counsel firm, to add 35 attorneys and office locations in Chicago, Denver and Covington, Kentucky.

On February 1, 2015, the firm completed a merger with Huddleston Bolen, a West Virginia-based firm with approximately 40 attorneys in West Virginia and Kentucky. The merger also enabled the firm to open an office in Huntington, West Virginia. Later in 2015, the firm completed additional mergers with Gifford, Krass, Sprinkle, Anderson & Citkowski, P.C. and Leventhal Law to open four additional offices, including locations in Detroit, Michigan and San Diego, California.

In 2021, Dinsmore announced its merger with Wooden McLaughlin LLP in Indiana, adding offices in Indianapolis, Evansville and Bloomington.

In January 2023, Dinsmore announced the expansion of the San Diego office with the merger into the firm of Mulvaney Barry Beatty Lynn and Mayers LLP. In August 2023, Dinsmore announced the merger with the firm of Mateer & Harbert, P.A., and the launch of a new Orlando office. In November 2023, Dinsmore announced the launch of a Miami office. Then, in January 2024, Dinsmore announced the launch of an office in Houston, Texas.

== Practice areas ==
Dinsmore is a full service firm and has more than 90 law practices, including intellectual property, corporate regulations surrounding labor, employment, securities and immigration, telecom and media, criminal law, and financial law services relating to estates and taxes. The Firm also provides lobbying services via its Washington, DC office.

== Notable lawyers and alumni ==
- Charles W. Sawyer, former United States Secretary of Commerce under the Truman administration
- Potter Stewart, former Associate Justice of the Supreme Court of the United States
- Justin R. Walker, Circuit Judge, United States Court of Appeals for the District of Columbia Circuit
- Karen K. Caldwell, Judge on the United States District Court for the Eastern District of Kentucky
- Michael J. Newman, Judge on the United States District Court for the Southern District of Ohio
- Donald Alexander, former Commissioner of Internal Revenue by President Richard Nixon
- Mike Crites, former U.S. Attorney for the Southern District of Ohio
- Robert M. Duncan Jr., former U.S. Attorney for the Eastern District of Kentucky
- Michael B. Stuart, former U.S. Attorney for the Southern District of West Virginia
