= Hanadi Nadeem =

American politician from Nevada

Member of the Nevada Assembly from the 34th district
- Incumbent
- Assumed office November 6, 2024
- Preceded by: Shannon Bilbray-Axelrod

Personal details
- Born: 1972 (age 53–54) Riyadh, Saudi Arabia
- Party: Democratic
- Spouse: Nadeem Tariq
- Children: 5
- Website: Campaign website Legislature website

Hanadi Nadeem (born 1972) is an American physician and politician serving as a member of the Nevada Assembly since 2024. A member of the Democratic Party, she was elected in 2024 to represent the 34th district, which includes Summerlin in Las Vegas.

== Career ==
Nadeem was born in Riyadh, Saudi Arabia, and raised in Islamabad, Pakistan, in a family of physicians. She initially moved to the United States for her husband’s medical residency in Philadelphia, then the couple moved to Chicago and finally Las Vegas.

Nadeem runs the Shifa Medical Center, a primary care clinic, in Las Vegas.

=== Nevada House of Representatives ===
Nadeem ran for the Nevada General Assembly in 2024 to succeed Shannon Bilbray-Axelrod, who unsuccessfully ran for the Clark County Commission. A Committee supporting her Republican opponent, Brandon Davis, paid for billboards showing a publicly available photo of Nadeem with links to a website showing evidence she supported terrorist sympathizers over Facebook posts where she had supported Imran Khan. A website launched by the Committee linked on the signs described Nadeem a "far left extremist", leading to condemnation by Nadeem, Assembly speaker Steve Yeager, and U.S. senator Catherine Cortez Masto.

In 2025, Nadeem received criticism alongside nine other Democrat Nevada Legislators for leaving the Assembly in a deliberate attempt to avoid voting on SB179, a bill to add Antisemitism to the list of considerations when conducting an investigation into an alleged unlawful discriminatory practice in housing, employment or public accommodations.

== Personal life ==
Nadeem is Muslim and married to internal medicine doctor Nadeem Tariq, with whom she has five children. She is the first Muslim woman elected to the Nevada State Legislature.

== Electoral history ==
Nevada State Assembly 34th district general election, 2024
Party	Candidate	Votes	%
Democratic	Hanadi Nadeem	16,452	53.25%
Republican	Brandon Davis	14,441	46.75%
Total votes		30,893	100%
