= Lee Moak =

Aviation safety expert and pilot

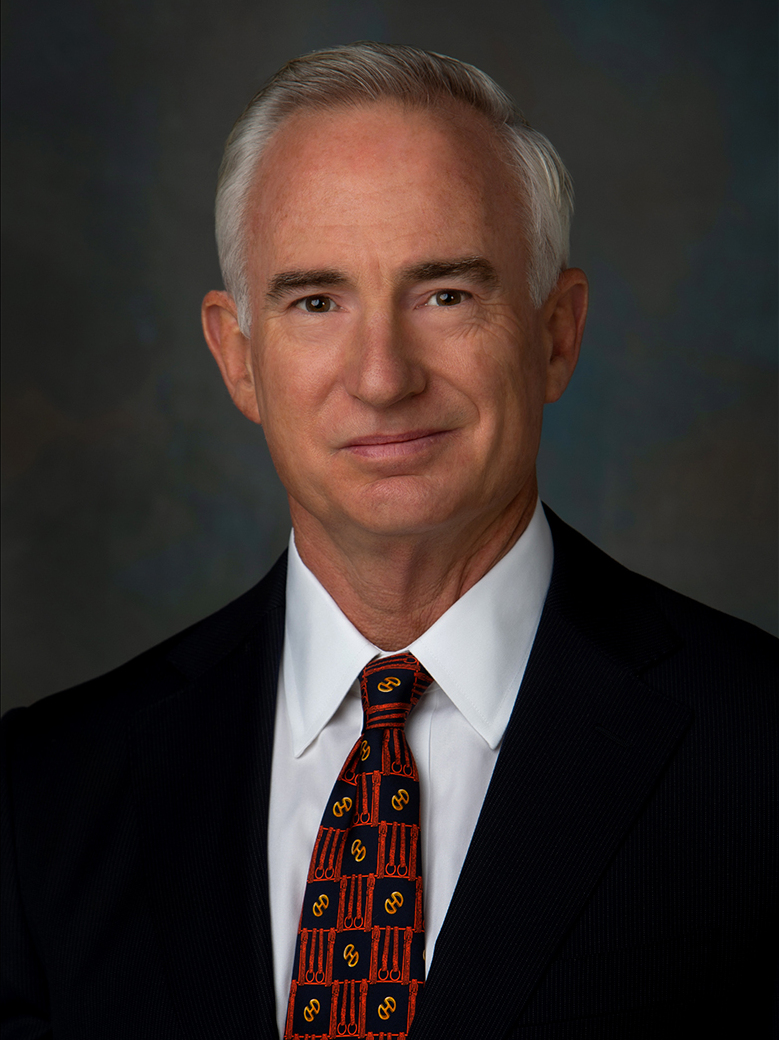
- Official portrait, 2020

Governor of the United States Postal Service
- In office June 18, 2020 – December 8, 2023
- Appointed by: Donald Trump
- Preceded by: Alan C. Kessler
- Succeeded by: Vacant

Personal details
- Born: April 20, 1957 (age 69)
- Party: Democratic
- Education: University of West Florida
- Occupation: CEO, Intrepid (2015 – current); ALPA, President (2011–2014)

Donald Lee Moak (born April 20, 1957) is an American political appointee, aviation safety expert, consultant, and co-founder of the Washington D.C. based consulting firm Intrepid (formerly Moak Group). He served on the Board of Governors of the United States Postal Service from 2020 to 2023. He previously served as co-chair of the Department of Transportation's Special Committee to Review FAA’s Aircraft Certification Process. Before joining Delta Air Lines and working his way up to captain a B-767, Moak served as a Marine Corps and U.S. Navy Reserve fighter pilot, and as president of the Air Line Pilots Association, International (ALPA).

== Military career ==
Moak served in the United States Marines, flying the F-4 Phantom and F/A-18 Hornet. He graduated from Naval Fighter Weapons School (TOPGUN), Air Combat Tactics Instructor (ACTI) program, and Marine Weapons & Tactic Instructor (WTI) program. In 1989, Moak transferred from the Marines as a Captain (O3) into the U.S. Navy Reserve where he continued to fly the F/A-18. In 1998, he was promoted to the rank of Commander (O5).

== Private sector and labor unions ==
=== Delta Air Lines (1988–2014) ===
After his active duty military service, Moak went to work for Delta Air Lines where he flew B-767s. He served three terms as chairman of the Delta Master Executive Council, beginning in 1995. Moak led Delta's pilots through major transformations within the airline, beginning with the airline's declaration of bankruptcy and subsequent Chapter 11 filing in 2005, fighting off a hostile takeover attempt from US Airways, and continuing in 2008 during their merger with Northwest Airlines.

=== Air Line Pilots Association, International (ALPA) (2011–2014) ===
Moak became a member of ALPA's pilots union in 1988 when hired as a pilot at Delta Air Lines. In 2011, he began a four-year term as ALPA President. During his tenure, Moak oversaw the unionization of JetBlue pilots and fought the threat posed by 'flag of convenience' foreign airlines entering the U.S. market while evading labor protections. Moak and the ALPA led the opposition to a proposal to set up a U.S. customs checkpoint in Abu Dhabi, which U.S. pilots viewed as an advantage for foreign-owned airlines.

From 2011 to 2015, Moak was a member of the AFL-CIO Executive Council, where he served on the International Affairs, Legislative/Policy, and Safety & Occupational Health committees.

== Political career ==
Moak was a member of the FAA NextGen Advisory Committee from 2011—2014, as well as the FAA Institute Management Council of the NextGen Institute from 2011 to 2014, and the FAA Management Advisory Council from 2012–2017. Lee Moak was a member of the FAA's Advanced Aviation Advisory Committee which later became the Drone Advocacy Committee.

In 2019, Moak was co-chair of the U.S. DOT's Special Committee to Review the FAA's Aircraft Certification Process and also served on the FAA's Drone Advisory Committee.

=== Department of Transportation Special Committee (2019–2020) ===
In March 2019, Moak was appointed by Department of Transportation Secretary Elaine Chao as co-chair of The Special Committee to Review FAA’s Aircraft Certification Process, an independent body whose findings and recommendations would be presented directly to the Secretary and the FAA Administrator. The Committee released its report on January 16, 2020 finding that overall, the FAA’s certification, as set forth by Congress and governed by regulation, is effective; however, "reforms must be adopted to help our extremely safe aviation system become even better at identifying and mitigating risk".

=== USPS Board of Governors (2020–2023) ===
Despite having no prior experience in the Postal Service, Moak was nominated by President Donald Trump to serve on the Board of Governors of the USPS. Moak was confirmed by the Senate on June 18, and he was sworn into his role on June 24, 2020. Following his confirmation, in August CNBC reported that the Moak Group had previously paid former Trump deputy White House council Stefan Passantino an amount in excess of $5,000 for "legal services", according to a 2017 ethics disclosure. Moak did not initially respond to a request for comment, but after publication told CNBC that he had been appointed to the Board by Trump after a recommendation from Democratic Senate Minority Leader Chuck Schumer.

== Current positions ==
Moak is CEO of the public affairs and business consulting firm Intrepid (formerly known as Moak Group), located in Washington, D.C. He co-founded the business in 2015 with Michael Robbins, who is now President and CEO of AUVSI.

He is a board member of the Aviation Club of Washington, D.C., which he joined in 2017.

In 2022, Moak was named to the advisory board of Reliable Robotics, a company which develops aviation automation systems, as well as to the board of directors of Aeromexico, the national airline of Mexico, where he is also chairman of the safety and security committee and a member of the audit and corporate governance committee.

In 2023, he was named to the board of directors of Wheels Up, an "on-demand" private aviation service.

Trade union offices
Preceded by John H. Prater	President of the Air Line Pilots' Association; 2011–2014	Succeeded by Tim Cannoll
