= Postal voting in the 2020 United States elections =

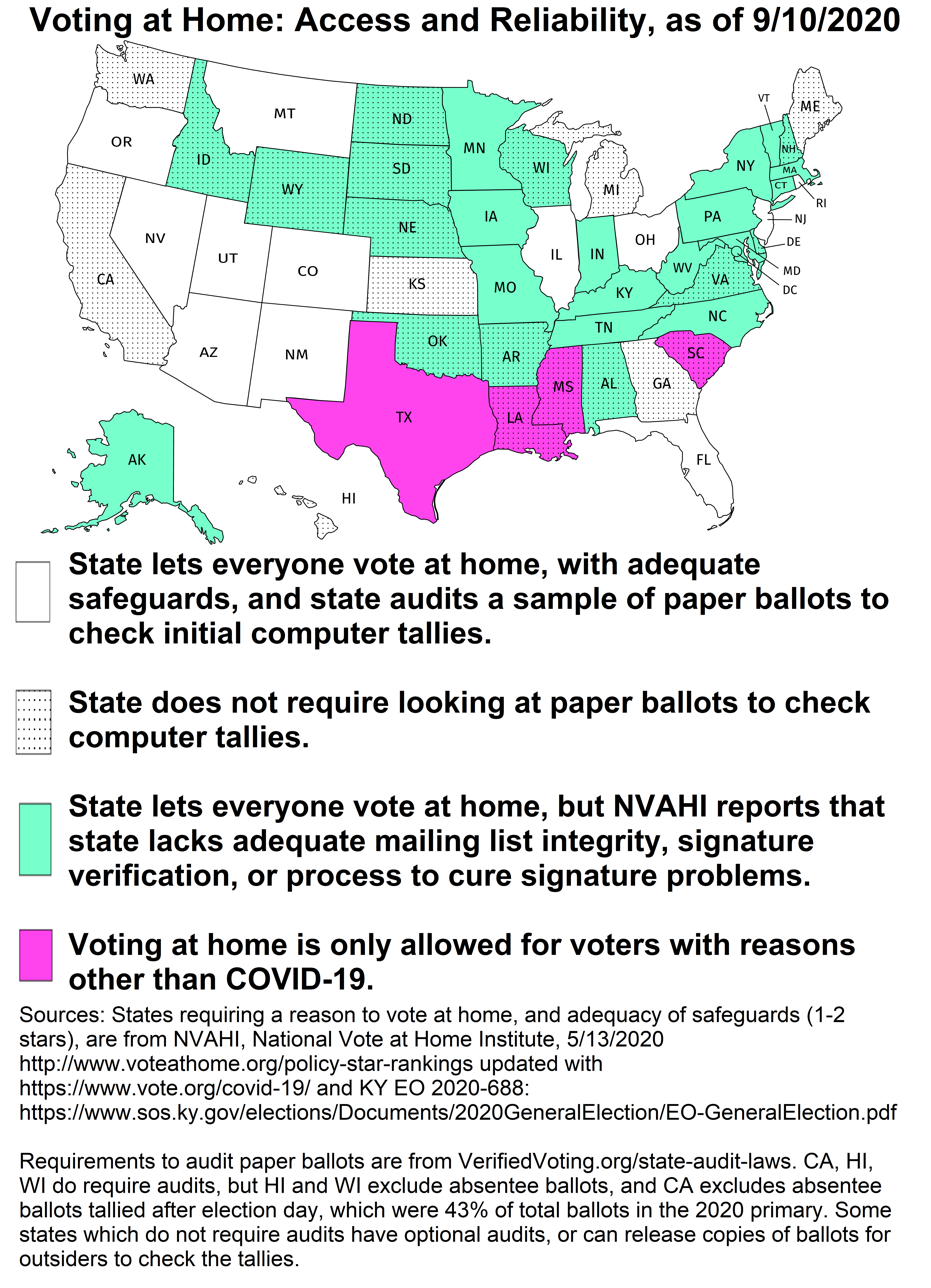
Early voting in U.S. states, 2020

Postal voting played an important role in the 2020 United States elections, with many voters reluctant to vote in person during the ongoing COVID-19 pandemic. The election was won by Joe Biden, the Democratic candidate. The Republican candidate President Donald Trump made numerous false claims of widespread fraud arising from postal voting, despite nearly-universal agreement to the contrary, with overwhelming amounts of supporting evidence, by the mainstream media, fact-checkers, election officials, and the courts.

A record number of voters, in excess of 65.6 million, cast postal votes. The Postal Service handled approximately 135 million pieces of election-related mail between September 1 and November 3 of 2020, delivering the vast majority of these materials on time.

== Background ==
As of July 2020, five states—Colorado, Hawaii, Oregon, Utah and Washington—hold elections almost entirely by mail, with Hawaii and Utah adopting full vote-by-mail elections in 2020. Postal voting is an option in 33 states and the District of Columbia. Other states allow postal voting only in certain circumstances, though the COVID-19 pandemic in 2020 has prompted further discussion about relaxing some of those restrictions. In the run up to the 2020 United States presidential election, then-President Donald Trump repeatedly asserted that mail-in voting would result in widespread fraud, and indicated that he would block necessary funding for the postal service. Among other things, this funding would have been used to ensure that mail-in votes were processed securely and on time. In September 2020, the Homeland Security Department issued an intelligence bulletin asserting "Russia is likely to continue amplifying criticisms of vote-by-mail and shifting voting processes amidst the COVID-19 pandemic to undermine public trust in the electoral process."

The Election Advisory Commission and National Conference of State Legislatures have published information on the staffing, equipment, space and procedures needed to handle large increases in postal ballots.

The National Vote at Home Institute, which advocates postal ballots and is led by former Denver elections director Amber McReynolds, analyzed all states in 2020 and found that 32 states "are missing major pieces of policy or best practices that ensure a secure mail ballot process such as a sufficient data integrity process, signature verification processes and/or a signature deficiency cure process." Among these 32 states, 15 lack steps to verify voters' addresses before mailing them ballots, 17 states do not mandate a signature verification process, and 30 do not have adequate options to cure defects in voter signatures. Often voters have no way to cure signature mis-matches.

Chart about July 2020 survey on chances of voting by mail in November election

In June 2020, Pew Research Center found that only 20% of all voters nationally said they had experience voting by mail, and only 2% to 8% had voted by mail in the states that have required reasons in the past.

According to a 2020 study, Democratic and Republican voters became increasingly polarized on their support for postal voting during the coronavirus pandemic.

== Allegations of fraud ==
In March 2020, President Donald Trump stated during a Fox News interview that a Democratic funding proposal to expand absentee voting during the pandemic "had things — levels of voting that, if you ever agreed to it, you’d never have a Republican elected in this country again."

In May 2020, Trump began to falsely claim that postal voting was highly vulnerable to fraud, stating that postal ballots will be "substantially fraudulent. Mail boxes will be robbed, ballots will be forged & even illegally printed out & fraudulently signed". Republican politicians are divided on the issue, with some making similar false claims about fraud, while others – including a considerable portion of Republican senators – have disavowed Trump's claims. Fact checkers say there is no evidence of substantial fraud associated with mail voting.

On July 30, 2020, President Trump suggested postponing the 2020 presidential election based on his unsubstantiated claims about extensive postal voting fraud. Article II, Section I, Clause IV of the Constitution gives Congress the sole power to determine the date of election day; 3 U.S.C. § 1 currently establishes November 3 as the election day.

On September 2, Donald Trump suggested that people in the state of North Carolina should vote twice in November's election, both in person and by mail, and so commit voter fraud.

In a September 2, 2020 CNN interview, attorney general Bill Barr asserted the Justice Department had indicted a Texas man for fraudulently completing 1,700 mail-in ballots. There was no such indictment, and the matter actually involved a series of errors by election officials during a county election, rather than fraud. Barr also repeated his concerns that foreign adversaries could flood the country with counterfeit ballots to disrupt the election, a threat that experts characterized as nearly impossible to execute. Days earlier, multiple senior American intelligence officials said there was no evidence any foreign powers intended to manipulate mail-in voting. On the day after Barr's interview, the Homeland Security Department issued an intelligence bulletin asserting "Russia is likely to continue amplifying criticisms of vote-by-mail and shifting voting processes amidst the COVID-19 pandemic to undermine public trust in the electoral process." In a subsequent September 2020 interview, Barr stated that mail-in voting meant "we’re back in the business of selling and buying votes" including "outright coercion, paying off a postman, here’s a few hundred dollars, give me some of your ballots."

At a White House news conference on September 23, 2020, after a journalist asked Trump to commit to "a peaceful transferral of power," he responded: "Get rid of the ballots and you’ll have a very peaceful — there won’t be a transfer, frankly. There will be a continuation." The New York Times interpreted this as a reference to mail-in ballots specifically. Ellen Weintraub, commissioner of the Federal Election Commission, tweeted in response: "In case anyone is unclear on the concept, in the United States of America, we do not 'get rid of' ballots. We count them. Counting the ballots – *all* the ballots – is the way we determine who leads our country after our elections. The only way." (As for Trump's suggestion that the transfer of power might not be peaceful, Sen. John Cornyn said the comment was inappropriate, Sen. Ben Sasse said it was "crazy stuff," and Sen. Mitt Romney said it was "unthinkable and unacceptable." All three are Republicans.)

== Court decisions ==
On September 30, 2020, federal judge Dana Christensen denied a request from the Trump campaign to block voting by mail in Montana, characterizing the campaign's claims that mail-in ballots would cause widespread voter fraud as "fiction." After Christensen's ruling was upheld by a three-judge panel of the Ninth Circuit Court of Appeals, Montana Republicans appealed to the Supreme Court, but their petition was rejected by justice Elena Kagan.

Minnesota's Secretary of State announced that ballots postmarked before Election Day that arrived by November 10 would still be counted. However, with just days before Election Day, the 8th Circuit Court of Appeals ruled ballots that arrived after 8:00 PM on Election Night would have to be ‘segregated, pending a legal challenge about whether they could be counted’. At the time almost 400,000 absentee ballots in Minnesota that had been requested were yet to be returned. The change had been challenged by two Minnesota Republicans whom Brasel ruled "are in danger of creating confusion rather avoiding." On October 11, federal judge upheld a lower court ruling that allowed Minnesota to accept absentee ballots received past 8:00 PM election night.

In September 2020, the Pennsylvania Supreme Court extended the deadline for accepting mail-in ballots and allowed them to be deposited in dropboxes. Republicans asked the United States Supreme Court to issue a stay against the deadline extension, which the Court denied on October 19. Pennsylvania Republicans then asked the Court to fast-track the request to block the deadline extension, but on October 28 the Court declined to hear the appeal before the election.

On October 28, the Supreme Court denied a request from Republicans and the Trump campaign to allow ballots to be received up to three days after election day in North Carolina, rather than the nine day limit that had been set by the State Board of Elections amidst the pandemic.

On November 4, federal judge Emmet G. Sullivan ordered Louis DeJoy to "sweep" USPS facilities for undelivered mail-in ballots and immediately deliver any they find. When DeJoy failed to comply, Sullivan announced that DeJoy would have to be "deposed". Following the court-ordered sweeps, approximately 1,700 ballots were found in Pennsylvania and about 500 were found in North Carolina. Federal court filings on November 5 reported that, the previous day, USPS had processed over 9,000 ballots in the Nevada Sierra district in Nevada; nearly 6,000 ballots in the Greensboro and Mid-Carolinas districts in North Carolina; and nearly 7,000 ballots in multiple Pennsylvania districts. At the time, the election outcomes in these states were still considered too close to call.

== Postal service crisis ==
The percentage of American voters who vote by mail or absentee ballots more than tripled since 1996, spiking in 2020 during the COVID pandemic.

In April 2020 Trevor Potter, the former chair of the Federal Election Commission stated "there's a real possibility that people will be afraid to vote on Election Day and won't have alternatives" due to the COVID-19 pandemic.

In July 2020, the administration of the United States Postal Service, including a bipartisan Trump-appointed Board of Governors and Board-appointed Postmaster General Louis DeJoy, instituted cost-reducing measures that resulted in slower delivery of mail. This caused fear that, due to the phenomenon of electoral blue shift, Democratic ballots might not be delivered in time to be counted. Election expert Edward Foley expressed concern that the blue shift phenomenon, along with difficulties caused by conducting an election during a pandemic, could lead to "a perfect storm" in the 2020 presidential election. Foley's concern was particularly pronounced due to the fact that incumbent president Donald Trump had not stated whether or not he would accept the results of the election.

The following month, Donald Trump stated that he opposed funding USPS because it would enable greater access to mail-in voting. Reacting to this sentiment, former president Barack Obama accused Trump of trying to "actively kneecap the Postal Service". The Postal Service warned voters in 46 states that it could not guarantee that all ballots cast by mail in the 2020 election would arrive in time to be counted. For this reason, election experts advocated that postal ballots be mailed weeks in advance of election day. Alternatively, Jamelle Bouie of The New York Times argued that Democrats should, if able, vote in person.

On September 17, 2020, federal judge Stanley Bastian issued an injunction against the USPS's cost-reducing measures, ruling that Trump and DeJoy were "involved in a politically motivated attack on the efficiency of the Postal Service," adding that the 14 states requesting the injunction "demonstrated that this attack on the Postal Service is likely to irreparably harm the states’ ability to administer the 2020 general election."

=== Postal Service performance in the 2020 election ===
A March 2021 report from the Postal Service's inspector general found that the vast majority of mail-in ballots and registration materials in the 2020 election were delivered to the relevant authorities on time. The Postal Service handled approximately 135 million pieces of election-related mail between September 1st and November 3rd, delivering 97.9% of ballots from voters to election officials within three days, and 99.89% of ballots within seven days.

== Drop-off boxes ==
On October 5, Texas governor Greg Abbott issued a proclamation limiting each county to one dropbox for mail-in ballots. Federal judge Robert Pitman blocked Abbott's order on October 9. The next day, Texas attorney general Ken Paxton appealed to the Fifth Circuit Court of Appeals for an emergency stay of Pitman's ruling, which a three-judge panel temporarily granted on an administrative basis pending further review. A Texas state judge also blocked Abbott's order on October 15, and a state appeals court upheld that decision on October 23, taking the case to the Texas Supreme Court, which ruled in favor of Abbott on October 27.

An effort by the Trump campaign and Republican Party to have ballot dropboxes declared unconstitutional in Pennsylvania was blocked by federal judge Nicholas Ranjan on October 10.

The California Republican Party directed its voters to return their ballots to unofficial drop-off boxes. While the party claims this is permitted under a 2016 ballot collection law, Secretary of State Alex Padilla issued a cease-and-desist order; the party said it would not comply.

There have been multiple instances of ballot boxes being set on fire which are being investigated as potential arson:

- Baldwin Park, California, October 18
- Boston, Massachusetts, October 25

== Deadlines ==
2020 Postal Voting Deadlines (All times are in the local time zone unless stated otherwise)
State	Postmarked By	Received By
Alabama	November 2	November 3 at 12:00 p.m.
Alaska	November 3	
Arizona		November 3 at 7:00 p.m.
Arkansas		November 3 at 7:30 p.m.
California	November 3	November 20
Colorado		November 3 at 7:00 p.m.
Connecticut		November 3 at 8:00 p.m.
Delaware		November 3 at 8:00 p.m.
Florida		November 3 at 7:00 p.m.
Georgia		November 3 (Military/overseas: November 6)
Hawaii		November 3 at 7:00 p.m.
Idaho		November 3 at 8:00 p.m.
Illinois	November 3	November 17
Indiana		November 3 at 12:00 p.m.
Iowa	November 2	November 9 at 12:00 p.m.
Kansas	November 3	November 6
Kentucky	November 3	November 6
Louisiana		November 2 at 4:30 p.m.
Maine		November 3 at 8:00 p.m.
Maryland	November 3	November 13 at 10:00 a.m.
Massachusetts	November 3	November 6
Michigan		November 3 at 8:00 p.m.
Minnesota	November 3	November 10
Mississippi	November 3	November 10
Missouri		November 3 at 7:00 p.m.
Montana		November 3 at 8:00 p.m.
Nebraska		November 3 at 8:00 p.m. CST / 7:00 p.m. MST
Nevada	November 3	November 10
New Hampshire		November 3 at 5:00 p.m.
New Jersey	November 3	November 10 at 8:00 p.m.
New Mexico		November 3 at 7:00 p.m.
New York	November 3	November 10
North Carolina	November 3	November 6 at 5:00 p.m.
North Dakota	November 2	
Ohio	November 2	November 13
Oklahoma		November 3 at 7:00 p.m.
Oregon		November 3 at 8:00 p.m.
Pennsylvania	November 3 at 8:00 p.m.	November 6 at 5:00 p.m.
Rhode Island		November 3 at 8:00 p.m.
South Carolina		November 3 at 7:00 p.m.
South Dakota		November 3
Tennessee		November 3 at 8:00 p.m. EST / 7:00 p.m. CST
Texas		November 3 at 7:00 p.m.
Utah	November 2	November 16
Vermont		November 2 at 5:00 p.m.
Virginia	November 3	November 6 at 12:00 p.m.
Washington	November 3	
West Virginia	November 3	November 8
Wisconsin		November 3 at 8:00 p.m.
Wyoming		November 3 at 7:00 p.m.

== See also ==
- 2020 United States elections
- Ballot tracking in the United States
- Republican efforts to restrict voting following the 2020 presidential election
