= Shannon Bilbray-Axelrod =

American politician

Member of the Nevada Assembly from the 34th district
- In office November 9, 2016 – November 6, 2024
- Preceded by: Victoria Seaman
- Succeeded by: Hanadi Nadeem

Personal details
- Born: Shannon Mary Bilbray; 1973 (age 52–53) Las Vegas, Nevada, U.S.
- Party: Democratic
- Spouse: Danny Axelrod
- Children: 1
- Education: University of San Diego

Shannon Mary Bilbray-Axelrod (born 1973) is an American politician. She was a Democratic member of the Nevada Assembly representing the 34th district, which covers parts of the western Las Vegas Valley, from 2016 to 2024.

== Biography ==
Bilbray-Axelrod is a third-generation Nevadan born in Las Vegas in 1973, and graduated from the University of San Diego where she studied political science and government. She is the daughter of former U.S. Representative James Bilbray, and her sister, Erin Bilbray, was an unsuccessful 2014 candidate for Nevada's 3rd congressional district.

She got her political start after college working for Illinois Sen. Dick Durbin's first senatorial campaign. She interned in the Clinton White House and then-Sen. Joe Biden's office, and was Congresswoman Dina Titus' liaison for veteran's affairs, environmental, and education issues from 2009 to 2011.

Bilbray-Axelrod ran for the Assembly in 2016, prevailing in a three-way Democratic primary and defeating Republican Matt Williams in the general election.

She worked as the director of new business development for Organized Karma, a lobbying, marketing and campaign strategy firm. Her biggest project there had centered around the 100th anniversary of the park system -- "showing how important the park system is to this nation and why it's so important to keep it up," she said. In March 2017, in accordance with Federal law and as a requirement of all employees of Organized Karma, it was reported Bilbray-Axelrod had registered in 2016 as a foreign agent on behalf of Saudi Arabia. This was in order for Organized Karma to legally represent a client wishing to lobby against the Justice Against Sponsors of Terrorism Act.

== Personal life ==
Bilbray-Axelrod and her husband, Danny Axelrod, have a daughter, Molly. She is Jewish.

== Political positions and Legislative work ==
Bilbray-Axelrod supports legalization of marijuana, and supports universal background checks for gun purchases.

As a Nevada Assemblywoman, Bilbray-Axelrod served on Assembly committees for Government Affairs, Legislative Operations and Elections, Transportation, Growth and Infrastructure, and Judiciary. Additionally, she served as vice-chair of Natural Resources Committee and Chair of the Education Committee.

Bilbray-Axelrod sponsored the bill that became law banning marriage for people under the age of 18 in Nevada. Bilbray-Axelrod also questioned a proposal that would limit the powers of four new, non-voting members of the Clark County school board.

== Electoral history ==
Nevada Assembly District 34 Democratic primary, 2016
Party	Candidate	Votes	%
Democratic	Shannon Bilbray-Axelrod	1,199	39.7%
Democratic	Zach Conine	1,126	37.3%
Democratic	Manny Garcia	692	22.9%
Total votes		3,017	100.0%

Nevada Assembly District 34 election, 2016
Party	Candidate	Votes	%
Democratic	Shannon Bilbray-Axelrod	14,788	58.6%
Republican	Matt Williams	10,444	41.4%
Total votes		25,232	100.0%
