= Amber McReynolds =

American election administration expert (born 1979)

Chair of the Board of Governors of the United States Postal Service
- Incumbent
- Assumed office December 6, 2024
- President: Joe Biden; Donald Trump
- Preceded by: Roman Martinez

Member of the Board of Governors of the United States Postal Service
- Incumbent
- Assumed office June 15, 2021
- Appointed by: Joe Biden
- Preceded by: David Williams

Personal details
- Born: 1979 (age 46–47)
- Party: Independent
- Education: University of Illinois, Urbana-Champaign (BS); London School of Economics (MS)

Amber Faye McReynolds (born 1979) is an American politician serving since 2024 as chair of the Board of Governors of the United States Postal Service. McReynolds is a member of the National Council on Election Integrity, the National Task Force on Election Crises, and the Board of Directors for Represent Women.

== Education ==
McReynolds is from Kewanee, Illinois. Her father was a defense attorney and judge. She earned a Bachelor of Science degree from the University of Illinois at Urbana–Champaign and a Master of Science from the London School of Economics.

== Career ==
McReynolds worked at the office of the Denver Clerk and Recorder from 2005 to 2018, serving as the city's director of elections from 2011 to 2018. There she led the city's transition to a fully vote-by-mail election system. Denver created the Ballot TRACE system, the first municipal program that notifies voters of the delivery and counting of their mailed ballots, and McReynolds introduced an app for electronic collection and verification of petition signatures. In 2018 she was named one of Governing's Public Officials of the Year.

In August 2018 she became CEO of the National Vote at Home Institute to advocate for universal postal voting, which they say increases voter turnout, reduces administration costs, promotes equity by providing easier methods to vote, and is secure against fraud. She has provided advice to voters and election officials on adopting best practices for mail-in voting, including training of election workers, use of appropriate counting equipment, and educating voters. McReynolds and the Institute gained prominence in 2020, when many states expanded access to absentee ballots during the COVID-19 pandemic, allowing voters to vote at home by mail rather than in person. She provided recommendations for sending voters ballots and how to collect them.

McReynolds testified before Congress twice about voting safely during a pandemic and election security. Then-California Secretary of State Alex Padilla said McReynolds influenced and advised California's mailing of ballots to every voter, and Georgia Secretary of State Brad Raffensperger's office used McReynolds's advice on implementing the system. The National Vote at Home Institute provided reports for how states could implement vote-by-mail, and 65 million votes were cast by mail in the November 2020 election.

On February 24, 2021, President Joe Biden announced that he would appoint McReynolds to a vacant seat on the Board of Governors of the United States Postal Service. On March 15, 2021, her nomination was sent to the Senate. President Biden nominated McReynolds to the seat vacated by David C. Williams. She was confirmed by the Senate, 59–38, on May 13, 2021 to a term expiring December 8, 2026. On June 15, 2021, she was sworn into office by Susan Rice. McReynolds is the only female Governor of the Postal Service and the first with experience with voting and elections. She is not affiliated with either of the two major American political parties.

She co-wrote the election reform handbook When Women Vote in January 2020. McReynolds is also on the founding board of directors of the National Association of Nonpartisan Reformers.
