= Robert M. Duncan Jr. =

American attorney (born 1978)

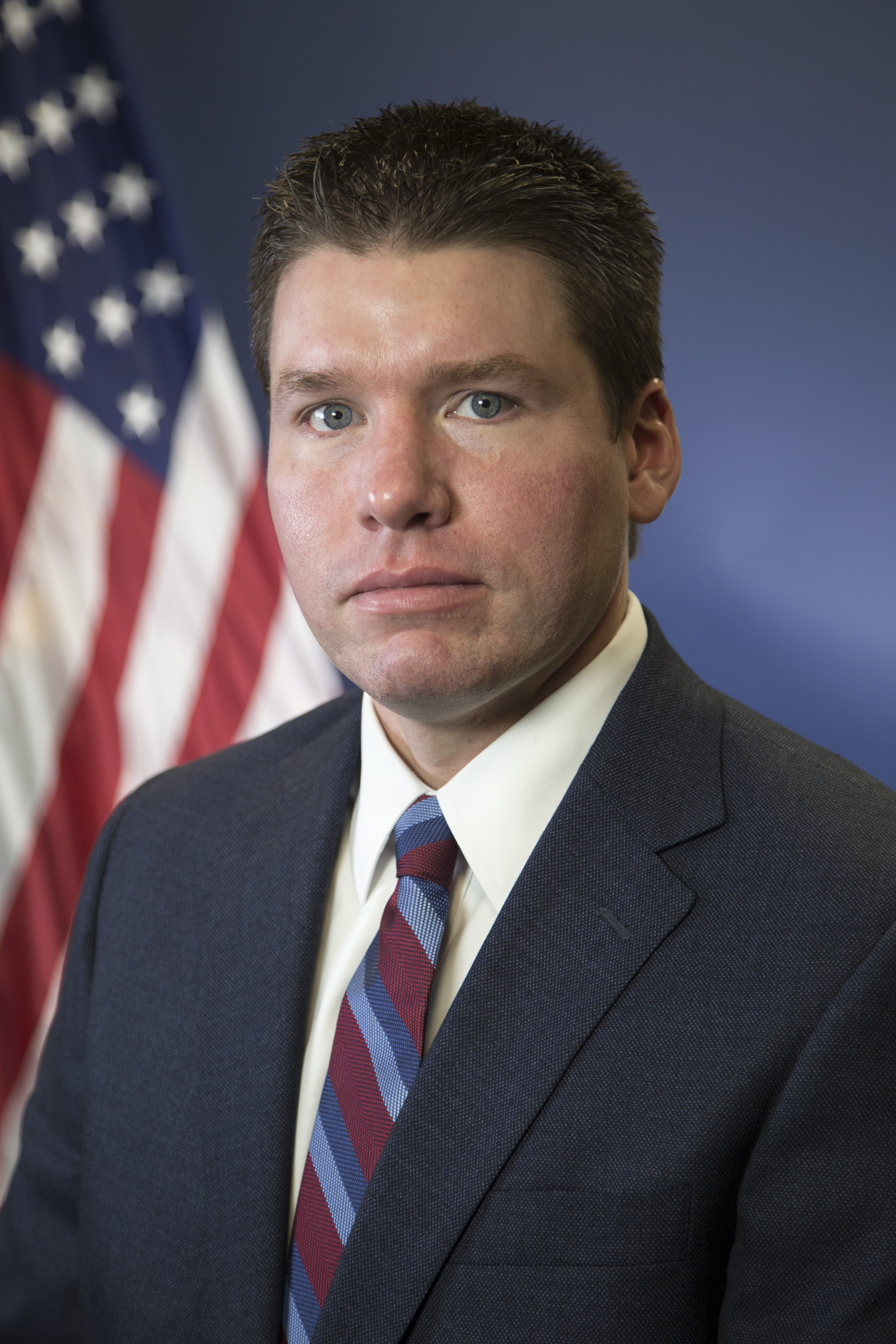

Deputy Attorney General for the Commonwealth of Kentucky
- Incumbent
- Assumed office January 1, 2024 Serving with Russell Coleman

United States Attorney for the Eastern District of Kentucky
- In office November 21, 2017 – January 24, 2021
- President: Donald Trump; Joe Biden
- Preceded by: Kerry B. Harvey
- Succeeded by: Carlton S. Shier, IV (acting)

Personal details
- Born: 1978 (age 47–48) Ashland, Kentucky, U.S.
- Relations: Mike Duncan (father)
- Education: Centre College; University of Kentucky (JD)

Robert Michael Duncan Jr. (born 1978) is an American attorney who serves as the Kentucky Deputy Attorney General. He previously served as the United States Attorney in the United States District Court for the Eastern District of Kentucky from 2017 to 2021.

== Early life and education ==
Duncan was born in Ashland, Kentucky, and raised in Inez, Kentucky, along the Kentucky-West Virginia border. He is the son of Mike Duncan, an attorney who is a former Chair and current member of the Board of Governors of the United States Postal Service and former Chair of the Republican National Committee. He graduated from Sheldon Clark High School in 1996. In 2000 he graduated from Centre College earning a B.A. in English and a minor in history. In 2003, Duncan received his J.D. from University of Kentucky College of Law.

== Career ==
After law school, Duncan served as a law clerk for Henry Rupert Wilhoit Jr. of the United States District Court for the Eastern District of Kentucky. Duncan served as an Assistant United States Attorney for the United States District Court for the Eastern District of Kentucky from 2005 until 2017. Serving as an Assistant United States Attorney, he prosecuted complex drug trafficking, money laundering, firearms offenses, and violent crime. From 2007 to 2013, he served as coordinator of the Project Safe Neighborhoods Program and also served as the Professional Responsibility Officer for his office.

Duncan was nominated for United States Attorney for the Eastern District of Kentucky by President Donald Trump on August 3, 2017, confirmed by the Senate on November 9, 2017, and was sworn in by Karen Caldwell, Chief Judge of the Eastern District of Kentucky, on November 21, 2017. He resigned on January 24, 2021.

It February 2021, it was announced that Duncan would enter the private sector becoming a partner at the Dinsmore law firm in Lexington, Kentucky.

On November 14, 2023, Kentucky Attorney General-elect Russell Coleman announced Duncan, who was a co-chair of his transition team, would serve as Deputy Attorney General.
