= One Party Country =

Book by Peter Wallsten and Tom Hamburger

One Party Country is a book by Los Angeles Times reporters Peter Wallsten and Tom Hamburger. The book details the Republican Party's vision for long term electoral supremacy in the United States through a generation-long effort to develop its political infrastructure, its knowledge of voter motivations, and by appealing to voter demographics that have traditionally leaned to the Democrats (e.g. Latinos and African-Americans). The full title and subtitle are One Party Country: The Republican Plan for Dominance in the 21st Century.
