= Peter Wallsten =

American journalist and author

Peter Wallsten is an American journalist and author who is currently an accountability and enterprise editor at The New York Times. He was previously a White House correspondent.

== Early life and education ==
Wallsten was brought up in Chapel Hill, North Carolina, and graduated from the University of North Carolina in 1994.

== Career ==
Wallsten started his career writing for the Miami Herald, St. Petersburg Times, Charlotte Observer and the Congressional Quarterly.

He became a White House correspondent for the Los Angeles Times in 2004, and authored, with Tom Hamburger, One Party Country: The Republican Plan for Dominance in the 21st Century.

Wallsten joined The Wall Street Journal in 2009 as a national political reporter before moving to the Post to become a White House correspondent in 2010. He was appointed a senior politics editor in 2013.

In 2025, Wallsten joined The New York Times as an editor in its Washington bureau.

== Personal life ==
Wallsten is partially blind as a result of Stargardt disease, which is a genetically inherited form of macular degeneration. In June 2006, this caused an exchange of words with President George W. Bush at a White House press conference. Unaware of the journalist's medical condition, the president questioned Wallsten's need to wear sunglasses when the sun wasn't visible. Bush later apologized for the incident.
