= Anton Hajjar =

American attorney

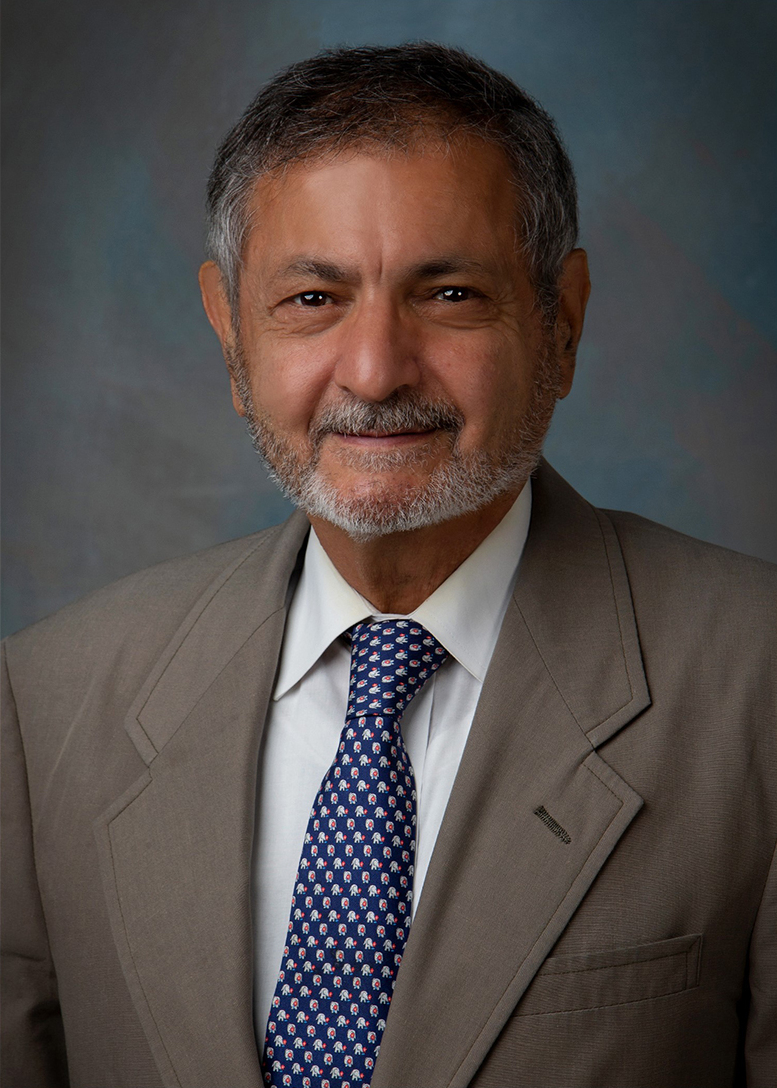

Governor of the United States Postal Service
- In office June 15, 2021 – December 8, 2024
- Appointed by: Joe Biden
- Preceded by: Carolyn Gallagher
- Succeeded by: Vacant

Personal details
- Education: Fordham University (BA); Tulane University (JD)

Anton G. Hajjar is an American labor and employment attorney who served as a governor of the Board of Governors of the United States Postal Service. Hajjar was previously general counsel of the American Postal Workers Union.

== Early life and education ==
A third-generation Christian Syrian-American, Hajjar was raised in Brooklyn. He earned a Bachelor of Arts degree from Fordham University and a Juris Doctor from Tulane University Law School.

== Career ==
After graduating from law school, Hajjar was a clerk for Judge John Minor Wisdom before becoming a staff attorney at the National Labor Relations Board. In 2002, Hajjar was elected to the American Law Institute Council. Hajjar has since worked as an attorney at Murphy Anderson PLLC and O'Donnell, Schwartz & Anderson, PC. On February 24, 2021, it was announced that Hajjar would be appointed to a vacant seat on the Board of Governors of the United States Postal Service. On March 15, 2021, his nomination was sent to the Senate. President Biden nominated Hajjar to the seat vacated by Carolyn L. Gallagher. On April 28, 2021, his nomination was reported favorably by the Senate Homeland Security and Governmental Affairs Committee. On May 28, 2021, his nomination was confirmed in the United States Senate by voice vote. On June 15, 2021, he was sworn into office by Susan Rice.
