= Philip F. Rubio =

American historian (born 1950)

- Born: May 14, 1950 (age 76); New Bedford, Massachusetts, U.S.

Academic background
- Education: Norwich University (BA); North Carolina Central University (MA); Duke University (PhD)
- Thesis: There's always work at the post office: African Americans fight for jobs, justice, and equality at the United States Post Office, 1940-1971 (2006)

Academic work
- Sub-discipline: 20th century U.S. civil rights and labor struggles
- Institutions: North Carolina A&T State University

Philip F. Rubio (born May 14, 1950) is an American historian. He is a professor of history at North Carolina A&T State University who specializes in 20th century U.S. civil rights and labor struggles.

== Early life and education ==
Rubio was born on May 14, 1950, in New Bedford, Massachusetts. He began working as a postal carrier while living in Colorado which he continued when he moved to Durham, North Carolina to pursue his post-secondary school education. While earning his Bachelor of Arts and Master's degree, he worked full-time for the Colorado and North Carolina post office from 1980 until 2000. During his time there, he became more interested in black history and was inspired by Pauli Murray's book Proud Shoes: The Story of an American Family. He eventually retired from the post office in 2000 after earning a Mellon Fellowship to pursue his doctoral degree at Duke University which he received in 2006.

As a doctoral student, Rubio published his first book titled A History of Affirmative Action 1619-2000 in 2001 through the University Press of Mississippi. The book was divided into seven distinct periods of African-American history which examined how white individuals fought against racial equality whenever discrimination was attempted to be nulled. He also brought about the idea of "the creation of the white race" as a method to further segregated freed Black slaves and white indentured servants.

== Career ==
Upon earning his PhD, Rubio became a teaching fellow and adjunct instructor at the Center for Documentary Studies at Duke University while also teaching at North Carolina Central University (NCCU). After a year at both institutions, he was offered a tenure track position at North Carolina A&T State University in 2007. While at the university, Rubio wrote his second book titled There's Always Work at the Post Office: African American Postal Workers and the Fight for Jobs, Justice, and Equality, which was a re-publication of his thesis. In his book, he argues that postal work and postal unions were central figures to African-American lives and served as an "avenue of black mobility and incubator of black struggle." As a result, Rubio received the 2011 Rita Lloyd Moroney Book Award from the United States Postal Service (USPS).

During the COVID-19 pandemic, United States President Donald Trump refused to grant any additional funding to the USPS because he wanted to prevent any increase in balloting by mail. In response to Trump's efforts of blocking postal services, Rubio wrote his third book titled Undelivered: From the Great Postal Strike of 1970 to the Manufactured Crisis of the U.S. Postal Service.

== Selected publications ==
- Undelivered: From the Great Postal Strike of 1970 to the Manufactured Crisis of the U.S. Postal Service (2020)
- There's Always Work at the Post Office: African American Postal Workers and the Fight for Jobs, Justice, and Equality (2010)
- A History of Affirmative Action 1619-2000 (2001)
