= Duncanson (surname) =

Origin
- Meaning: "son of Duncan"
- Region of origin: Scotland

Other names
- Variant form: Duncan

Duncanson is a Scottish patronymic surname meaning "son of Duncan". People with the name Duncanson include:

- Albert Duncanson (1911– ), Canadian, Olympic ice hockey player
- Craig Duncanson (born 1967), Canadian professional ice hockey left winger
- Jimmy Duncanson (1919–1996), Scottish footballer
- John Duncanson (clergyman) (c. 1530–1601), Scottish clergyman, tutor and chaplain to King James VI
- John Duncanson (broadcaster), former British television continuity announcer and presenter
- Kirk Duncanson FRSE (1846–1913) botanist and surgeon
- Robert Duncanson (Army officer) (1657–1705), Scottish military officer
- Robert Seldon Duncanson (c. 1822–1872), African American artist

== See also ==
- Duncan (surname)
