= Mike Duncan (politician) =

American political activist (born 1951)

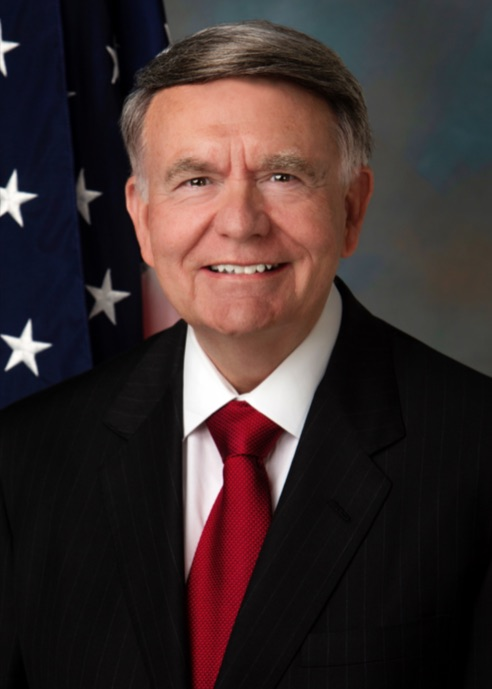
- Official portrait, 2018

Chairman of the Board of Governors of the United States Postal Service
- In office September 13, 2018 – February 9, 2021
- President: Donald Trump; Joe Biden
- Preceded by: Thurgood Marshall Jr.
- Succeeded by: Ron Bloom

Governor of the United States Postal Service
- In office September 13, 2018 – March 27, 2025
- Appointed by: Donald Trump
- Preceded by: Thurgood Marshall Jr.
- Succeeded by: Vacant

Chairman of the Board of Directors of the Tennessee Valley Authority
- In office May 18, 2009 – May 2010
- President: Barack Obama
- Preceded by: William B. Sansom
- Succeeded by: Dennis C. Bottorff

Chair of the Republican National Committee
- In office January 19, 2007 – January 30, 2009 Serving with Mel Martínez (2007)*
- Preceded by: Ken Mehlman
- Succeeded by: Michael Steele

Member of the Board of Directors of the Tennessee Valley Authority
- In office March 2006 – May 18, 2011
- Appointed by: George W. Bush
- Preceded by: Seat established
- Succeeded by: Peter Mahurin

Personal details
- Born: Robert Michael Duncan; 1951 (age 74–75) Oneida, Tennessee, U.S.
- Party: Republican
- Spouse: Joanne Duncan
- Relatives: Robert (son)
- Education: University of the Cumberlands (BA); University of Kentucky (JD)
- *Duncan served as National Chair of the RNC while Martínez served as General Chair from January 19, 2007 – October 19, 2007.

Robert Michael Duncan (born 1951) is an American politician. A member of the Republican Party, he served as the chairman of the Republican National Committee from 2007 to 2009. Throughout his career, he has served on the boards of a variety of public- and private-sector organizations. Duncan was chairman, president, and CEO of Inez Deposit Bank in Inez, Kentucky, which merged with First State Bank in February 2021. He is a former member of the Board of Governors of the U.S. Postal Service and served as its chairman from 2018 to 2021.

== Early life and career ==
Duncan was born in Oneida, Tennessee. He is active in numerous professional and nonprofit organizations. He served as chairman of a state university and serves as chairman of the board of trustees at Alice Lloyd College, a private four-year liberal arts college in Pippa Passes, Kentucky. He has served as chairman for the Center for Rural Development in Somerset, Kentucky, a $30 million state-of-the-art regional center emphasizing telecommunications, training, and development. President George W. Bush appointed him to the President's Commission on White House Fellows in 2001.

== Career ==
=== Chairman of the Republican National Committee ===
A lifelong Republican, Duncan was a delegate to the 1972, 1976, 1992, 1996, 2000, 2004, and 2008 Republican National Conventions and is one of the few persons ever to serve on the four standing convention committees. Duncan served as treasurer and general counsel of the Republican National Committee (RNC) from July 10, 2002, until his election as chairman. In January 2007, he was elected Chairman of the RNC, replacing Ken Mehlman, and served until January 30, 2009, when he withdrew from renomination to the chairmanship.

==== RNC re-election bid ====
RNC chairman vote

Source: CQPolitics, and Poll Pundit

Candidate	Round 1	Round 2	Round 3	Round 4	Round 5	Round 6
Michael Steele	46	48	51	60	79	91
Katon Dawson	28	29	34	62	69	77
Saul Anuzis	22	24	24	31	20	Withdrew
Ken Blackwell	20	19	15	15	Withdrew	
Mike Duncan	52	48	44	Withdrew		

Candidate won that Round of voting
Candidate withdrew
Candidate won RNC Chairmanship

=== Chairman of the Tennessee Valley Authority ===
President George W. Bush nominated him to the Tennessee Valley Authority Board; he was unanimously confirmed by the United States Senate in March 2006. He was subsequently elected to serve as the 15th chairman of the Tennessee Valley Authority in May 2009 and served until May 2010, when he was replaced by banker Dennis C. Bottorff.

=== Governor of the United States Postal Service ===
On September 13, 2018, he became a member of the Board of Governors of the United States Postal Service. On December 5, 2019, he was confirmed by the United States Senate to serve another full term ending in December 2025. He resigned from the board in March 2025 citing health concerns.

Duncan was involved in the selection of Louis DeJoy as U.S. postmaster general amid the 2020 presidential election. DeJoy did not go through the normal vetting process for postmaster general; two separate search firms were used by the USPS board, and neither firm mentioned DeJoy in their list of candidates. After DeJoy's appointment, postal service leadership implemented measures that led to delays in mail delivery and raised concerns about voting-by-mail in the 2020 election amid the coronavirus pandemic.

=== Senate Leadership Fund ===
Duncan is on the board of the Senate Leadership Fund, which is a super PAC tied to Mitch McConnell.

=== Other roles ===
Duncan also served as director of the Cleveland Federal Reserve Bank Cincinnati Branch. From 1989 to 1991, during a sabbatical, he worked in the Bush White House as assistant director of Public Liaison. He also served in the Bush administration as a member of the President's Commission on White House Fellows starting in 2001.

=== Education ===
Duncan holds degrees from the University of the Cumberlands and the University of Kentucky College of Law.

== Personal life ==
Duncan and his wife, Joanne, are 1974 graduates of the University of Kentucky College of Law. Duncan received his undergraduate degree from Cumberland College (now the University of the Cumberlands). They reside in Inez in Martin County in eastern Kentucky. They have one child, Rob, an assistant United States attorney in Lexington, Kentucky, who is married to Valerie Ridder, originally from Springfield, Missouri. The Duncans are the principal owners of two community banks with five offices in eastern Kentucky. His son, Robert M. Duncan Jr., has been United States Attorney for the Eastern District of Kentucky from 2017.

On September 10, 2012, Duncan became the new president and CEO of the American Coalition for Clean Coal Electricity (ACCCE).

Party political offices
Preceded by Ken Mehlman	Chair of the Republican National Committee; 2007–2009; Served alongside: Mel Martínez (2007)	Succeeded by Michael Steele
