= Mickey D. Barnett =

American politician

Mickey D. Barnett is an attorney and state senator from New Mexico who was a Governor of the United States Postal Service, appointed by President George W. Bush on August 17, 2006, and served until December 8, 2013. Barnett served one term as Republican National Committeeman from New Mexico before being defeated for re-election.

Barnett served in the New Mexico State Senate from 1980 to 1984. Previously, he served the federal government as a legislative assistant to Senator Pete Domenici (1972–1976).

Barnett is a graduate of Eastern New Mexico University, receiving a Bachelor of Arts degree in business administration. He received his J.D. degree from George Washington University National Law Center in 1977.
