= Board of Governors of the United States Postal Service =

USPS Board of Governors

Agency overview
- Type: Governing body
- Jurisdiction: United States Postal Service
- Headquarters: 475 L'Enfant Plaza SW, Washington, D.C. 20260
- Employees: 11 board members: 1 Postmaster General; 1 Deputy Postmaster General; 9 Governors
- Agency executives: Amber McReynolds, Chair; Derek Kan, Vice Chair
- Key document: 39 U.S.C. § 202
- Website: about.usps.com/who/leadership/board-governors/

The Board of Governors of the United States Postal Service is the governing body of the United States Postal Service (USPS). The board oversees the activities of the Postal Service, while the postmaster general actively manages its day-to-day operations.

The board directs "the exercise of the power" of the Postal Service, controls its expenditures, and reviews its practices and policies. It consists of 11 members; 6 are requisite to achieve an ordinary quorum. Of the 11 board members, 9 are the presidentially appointed governors, 1 is the postmaster general, and 1 is the deputy postmaster general. The 9 governors elect the postmaster general, the chairman of the board as well as the USPS inspector general; the governors and the postmaster general elect the deputy postmaster general. No more than five governors may belong to the same political party. The board also has the power to remove all of these officers.

The Board of Governors is comparable with the board of directors of most private corporations.

== History ==
Until 2007, each governor was appointed to a nine-year term or to the remainder of the unexpired term of a vacant seat. The terms of the nine appointed governors are staggered, commence after Senate confirmation and expire on December 8 of the year that the term would have ended had the terms been properly synchronized. The board can extend the term of a governor whose term is to expire by one year or until a successor has been confirmed, without Senate confirmation. Governors may be appointed for a second term, with Senate confirmation. No more than five of the nine governors may be of the same political party. The Postal Accountability and Enhancement Act, signed by President George W. Bush on December 20, 2006, besides other things, changed the terms of governors appointed after that date from nine to seven years.

On November 14, 2014 (with effect on February 1, 2015), the board appointed Megan Brennan postmaster general, to succeed Patrick R. Donahoe. In December 2014, the extended term of Mickey D. Barnett was to expire, while the Senate had still not confirmed five nominees submitted by then-president Obama. Just before the loss of its quorum, the board delegated its authority to a “Temporary Emergency Committee“ (TEC) comprising the board members for the time being, with the same authority as the board had with 9 appointed members, but without the quorum requirement. After December 2014, there were three appointed board members (James Bilbray, Ellen Williams and Louis J. Giuliano) as well as the postmaster general, Patrick R. Donahoe, and the deputy PMG, Ron Stroman, a total of five of the 11 members, and not enough to constitute a quorum. Megan Brennan became an ex officio member of the board on February 1, 2015. The extended terms of Ellen Williams and Louis J. Giuliano both expired in December 2015, and James Bilbray became the sole remaining appointed member. His nine-year term was extended by one year and he ceased to be a member in December 2016. At that point there were no appointed members on the board, and the PMG (Megan Brennan) and deputy PMG (Ron Stroman) made up the TEC.

In October 2017, President Donald Trump nominated three individuals to the board: Robert (Mike) Duncan, a former White House official during the George W. Bush administration, Calvin Tucker, and David Williams, former USPS inspector general. On August 28, 2018, the Senate confirmed Mike Duncan as chairman, and David Williams, as vice-chairman. On November 29, 2018, the governors appointed Tammy L. Whitcomb the USPS inspector general.

On August 1, 2019, the Senate confirmed three more nominations, allowing the board to reach a quorum for the first time since 2014. The new members are Ron Bloom and Roman Martinez IV, both former investment bankers, and John Barger, former director of the Investment and Retirement Boards of the Los Angeles County Employees Retirement Association, the country's largest pension fund.

In March 2020, Trump nominated Donald L. Moak to replace Alan C. Kessler (who had resigned in July 2011) and nominated William D. Zollars to replace James Bilbray (who had ceased being a member in December 2016). David C. Williams resigned from the board on April 30, 2020, and Ron Stroman resigned on June 1, 2020, as deputy PMG. On June 15, 2020, the TEC, comprising five members, selected Louis DeJoy to succeed Megan Brennan as Postmaster General (PMG). The Senate confirmed both nominations on June 18, 2020. As of January 2021, the board had six appointed members plus the postmaster general, sufficient to constitute a quorum on the board. Five of the board members are Republicans.

There were calls in January 2021 for President Joe Biden to quickly fill the vacant seats on the USPS Board of Governors. Critics including union members note the politicization of the USPS, the mishandling of absentee ballots during the 2020 elections, and ongoing delivery delays. Mark Dimondstein, president of the American Postal Workers Union also noted the lack of diversity on the current board: all members are men, there are no African Americans, and there is no one from a rural area. Philip F. Rubio, a history professor at North Carolina A&T State University, notes that the board is accountable to no one and the postmaster general is accountable only to the Board. Rubio has described Louis DeJoy's changes as "sabotage", and Congressman Bill Pascrell, (D-NJ) said, "Fire everybody at the top. They've done a lousy job." Dimondstein has suggested improving services by including financial services such as paycheck cashing, installing ATMs, and handling bill paying and overseas remittances.

On May 12, 2022, the United States Senate confirmed Dan Tangherlini (former head of the General Services Administration) to serve through December 2027 and Derek Kan (former deputy director of the Office of Management and Budget) through December 2028. They replace members Ron Bloom and John Barger.

== Responsibilities ==
The board directs the exercise of the powers of the Postal Service, directs and controls its expenditures, reviews its practices, conducts long-range planning, and sets policies on all postal matters. The board takes up matters such as service standards, capital investments, and facilities projects exceeding $25 million. It also approves officer compensation. The board generally meets once a month. Each January, the governors elect a chairman and a vice-chairman. Each governor receives $300 per day for not more than 42 days of meetings each year and travel expenses, in addition to an annual salary of $30,000. The governors employ a full-time corporate secretary who serves as the primary staff assistant to the board.

== Membership ==
Members may serve for one year beyond the expiration of their term or until a successor is confirmed. President Joe Biden nominated former general counsel of the American Postal Workers Union Anton Hajjar and voting rights activist Amber McReynolds on February 25, 2021. On March 15, 2021, the nomination of former deputy postmaster general Ron Stroman was sent to the Senate. President Biden nominated Stroman to the seat vacated by Ellen Williams.

On May 12, 2021, Stroman was confirmed to a term as governor expiring December 8, 2021 in a 69–30 vote. The Senate later confirmed a separate nomination for him to serve a term as governor expiring December 8, 2028. The U.S. Senate invoked cloture for McReynolds May 12, 2021 and confirmed her on May 13, 2021. Hajjar was confirmed on May 28, 2021.

On November 19, 2021, President Biden announced his intention to nominate Derek Kan and Dan Tangherlini to replace John M. Barger and Ron A. Bloom, respectively. Both Bloom and Barger were key allies of Louis DeJoy and had their terms expire on December 8, 2021. Bloom was replaced as chairman of the board by Roman Martinez IV on January 12, 2022. Biden's nominees Kan and Tangherlini received Senate confirmation on May 12, 2022, and took office shortly thereafter.

President Biden had announced the nominations of Val Demings, Gordon Hartogensis, Anton Hajjar, and the reappointment of William D. Zollars. Their nominations expired at the sine die adjournment of the 118th United States Congress.

=== Current members ===
The current board members as of December 8, 2025:

Position	Name	Party	Assumed office	Term expiration	Appointed by	Notes
Chair	Amber McReynolds	Independent	June 15, 2021	December 8, 2026	Joe Biden	Replaced David C. Williams
Vice Chair	Derek Kan	Republican	May 20, 2022	December 8, 2028	Joe Biden	Replaced John McLeod Barger
Governor	Ron Stroman	Democratic	June 15, 2021	December 8, 2028	Joe Biden	Replaced Ellen Williams
Governor	Dan Tangherlini	Democratic	May 20, 2022	December 8, 2027	Joe Biden	Replaced Ron Bloom
Governor	Vacant			December 8, 2029		Replacing Donald L. Moak
Governor	Vacant			December 8, 2029		Replacing William D. Zollars
Governor	Vacant			December 8, 2030		Replacing Anton Hajjar
Governor	Vacant			December 8, 2031		Replacing Roman Martinez IV
Governor	Vacant			December 8, 2032		Replacing Mike Duncan
Postmaster General (ex officio)	David P. Steiner	—N/a	July 15, 2025	No term limit	The Board	
Deputy Postmaster General (ex officio)	Douglas Tulino	Independent	May 12, 2021	No term limit	The Board	Chief Human Resources Officer of USPS Replaced vacancy left by Ron Stroman.

=== Nominations ===
President Trump has nominated the following to fill seats on the board. They await Senate confirmation.

Name	Party	Term expires	Replacing
Jeffrey Brodsky	Republican	December 8, 2029	William Zollars
William Gallo	Republican	December 8, 2030	Anton Hajjar
Anthony Lomangino	Republican	December 8, 2031	Roman Martinez IV
Robert Steffens	Republican	December 8, 2032	Robert M. Duncan

== Former members ==
Name	Title	Political party	Nominating president	Dates in office
Anton Hajjar	Vice Chairman	Democratic	Joe Biden	June 15, 2021 – December 8, 2024
Donald L. Moak	Governor	Democratic	Donald Trump	June 18, 2020 – December 8, 2023
William D. Zollars	Governor	Republican	Donald Trump	June 18, 2020 – December 8, 2023
Ron A. Bloom	Chairman	Democratic	Donald Trump	August 20, 2019 – December 8, 2021
Roman Martinez IV	Chairman	Republican	Donald Trump	August 1, 2019 – December 8, 2025
John McLeod Barger	Governor	Republican	Donald Trump	August 1, 2019 – December 8, 2021
Mike Duncan	Chairman	Republican	Donald Trump	September 13, 2018 – March 27, 2025
David C. Williams	Vice Chairman	Independent	Donald Trump	October 30, 2017 – April 30, 2020
Dennis J. Toner	Governor		Barack Obama	September 17, 2010
Thurgood Marshall Jr.	Governor		George W. Bush	December 15, 2006
Ellen C. Williams	Governor		George W. Bush	August 17, 2006
Katherine C. Tobin	Governor		George W. Bush	August 17, 2006
James Bilbray	Vice Chairman	Democratic	George W. Bush	August 17, 2006 – December 8, 2016
John S. Gardner	Governor		George W. Bush	January 6, 2006
Louis J. Giuliano	Governor		George W. Bush	November 3, 2004
Carolyn Lewis Gallagher	Governor		George W. Bush	November 3, 2004
James C. Miller III	Governor	Republican	George W. Bush	April 22, 2003 – 2012
