= Bobby Duncan (footballer, born 1945) =

Scottish footballer

Personal information
- Full name: Robert Duncan
- Date of birth: 27 April 1944 (age 82)
- Position: Centre back

Youth career
- Bonnyrigg Rose Athletic

Senior career*
Years	Team	Apps	(Gls)
1963–1971	Hibernian	82	(0)
1971–1974	East Fife	85	(0)
Total		169	(0)
- * Club domestic league appearances and goals

Bobby Duncan (born 27 April 1945) is a Scottish footballer who is most well known for playing for Hibernian. The highlight of his career was scoring a goal against Napoli in the UEFA Cup in 1967.

He played club football for Bonnyrigg Rose Athletic, Hibernian and East Fife.
