= Legislative history of United States four-star officers, 1947–1979 =

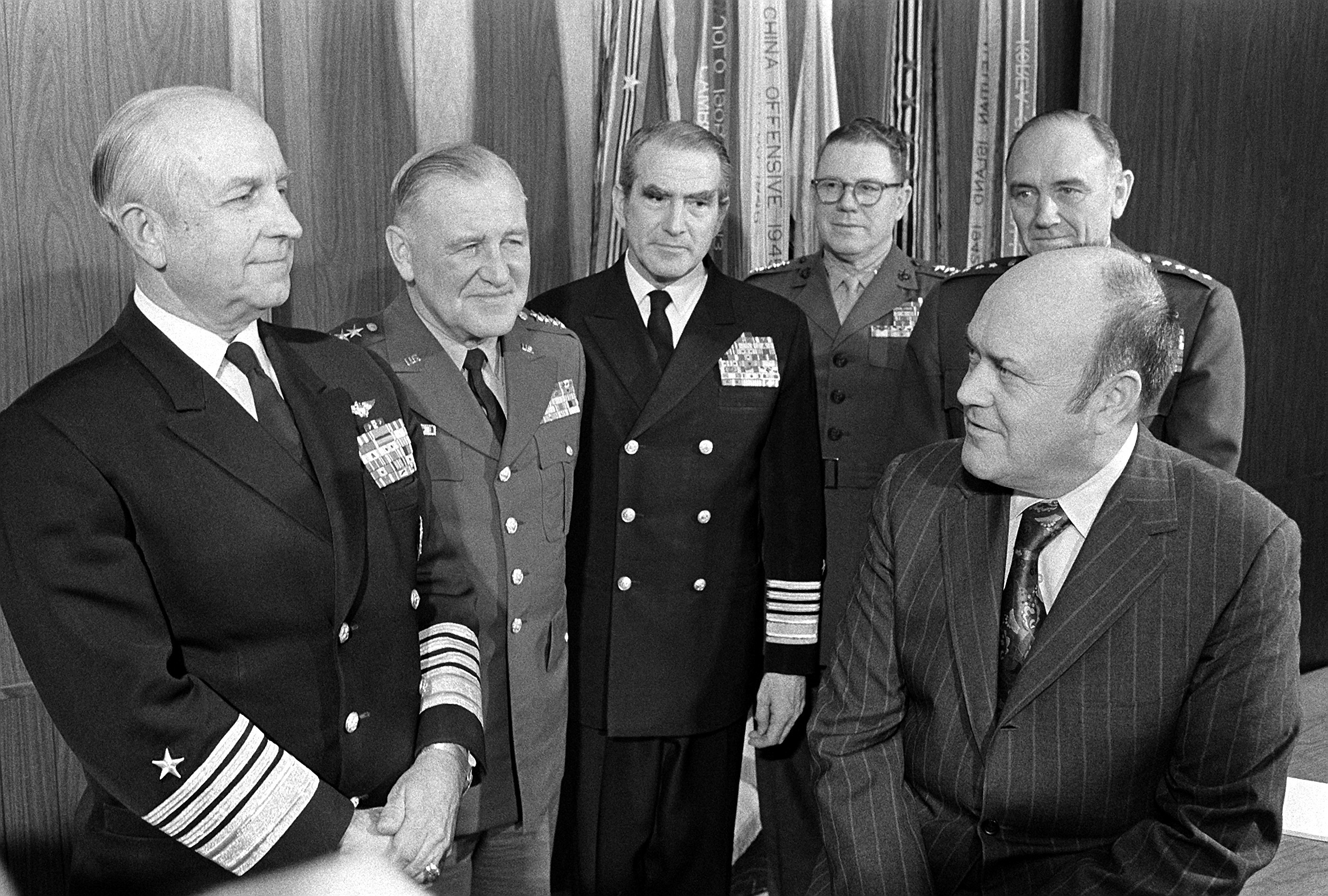
Defense secretary Melvin Laird meets with the Joint Chiefs of Staff in January 1973. Clockwise from left: Moorer, Abrams, Zumwalt, Cushman, Ryan, and Laird.

After World War II, four-star appointments were governed by the Officer Personnel Act (OPA) of 1947 until the passage of the Defense Officer Personnel Management Act (DOPMA) in 1980.

The Officer Personnel Act aligned but did not try to unify the separate personnel systems of the prewar Army and Navy, so there were slight variations between the services. Four-star officers in the maritime services—Navy, Marine Corps, Coast Guard—were appointed with Senate consent to one of a limited number of positions designated to carry that rank ex officio. The Army and Air Force had similar limits on the number of four-star positions that could be designated, but could also appoint an unlimited number of officers to any temporary grade during a national emergency like the Korean War, although the Senate declined to confirm further temporary four-star grades after 1955. Only the initial appointment to a four-star grade needed confirmation by the Senate, not subsequent reassignments.

Two-, three-, and four-star officers all shared the same O-8 pay grade until the O-9 and O-10 pay grades were created in 1958.

== History ==
=== Appointment ===
==== National Security Act of 1947 ====
The National Security Act of 1947 created the post-World War II national security establishment. The Army Air Forces, already semi-autonomous within the Army during the war, became an independent United States Air Force co-equal with the Army and Navy. The three services were unified into a National Military Establishment (NME) under a secretary of defense, but the service secretaries continued to report to the president as heads of Cabinet-level executive departments. The act also created the Central Intelligence Agency (CIA) and National Security Council (NSC), and formally established the Joint Chiefs of Staff as principal military advisors to the president and secretary of defense, ratifying their wartime role.

The act was amended in 1949 to strengthen the secretary of defense by converting the NME into a full executive department, the Department of Defense, demoting the three services to military departments within the Department of Defense. The 1949 amendments also established a statutory chairman of the Joint Chiefs of Staff who outranked all other military officers.

==== Officer Personnel Act ====
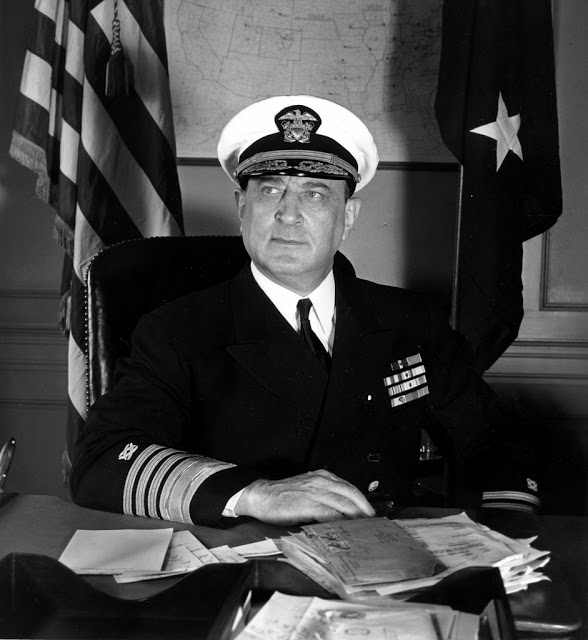
Ben Moreell, first four-star staff corps officer, had his grade changed to admiral from civil engineer with rank of admiral when the Officer Personnel Act of 1947 eliminated staff corps grades.

After World War II, four-star appointments were governed by the Officer Personnel Act of 1947 until the passage of the Defense Officer Personnel Management Act (DOPMA) in 1980.

There had been two types of four-star appointments during the war. Permanent peacetime law gave four-star rank ex officio to the officers serving as chief of staff of the Army and chief of naval operations, along with up to three other jobs in the Navy designated by the president to carry that rank. An officer held four-star rank only while detailed to one of those jobs, which did not need Senate consent, and reverted to his lower permanent grade afterward. Emergency wartime legislation also let the president promote an officer personally to a temporary higher grade, which did need Senate consent. An officer could carry a temporary personal grade to any assignment, but it expired at the end of the World War II emergency.

The Officer Personnel Act reauthorized both types of four-star appointments:

- The standard mechanism under the Officer Personnel Act was for the president to designate a position of importance and responsibility to carry a four-star grade ex officio, and appoint an officer to hold that grade temporarily while serving in that position, subject to Senate consent. The Senate only had to approve an officer's first appointment to a four-star grade, not subsequent transfers to other four-star positions, except for positions required by statute to be confirmed by the Senate, like Army chief of staff. While transitioning between four-star assignments, an officer reverted to two-star major general or rear admiral, the highest permanent grade to which an officer could be promoted personally on the active list. An officer could retire with four stars if nominated by the president and confirmed by the Senate.
- During a national emergency, the president could make an unlimited number of appointments in temporary grades, including four-star grades, with Senate consent, but only in the Army and Air Force. Since temporary grades were carried by the person, not the office, the Senate only confirmed the initial four-star promotion, not subsequent reassignments, and temporary four-star officers kept that rank even if not serving in a job specifically designated by the president to carry four stars. A temporary four-star officer could be retired with that grade administratively, without action by the president or Senate. To save time and effort during the Korean War emergency, the president asked the Army and Air Force to switch to the more flexible temporary grades in April 1953, but they reverted to the standard mechanism at the behest of the Senate Armed Services Committee in 1955.

The prewar Army and Navy had completely different systems for managing officer promotions, which the Officer Personnel Act updated but did not try to unify. For example, the act streamlined the Navy system by giving Navy staff corps officers the same grades as line officers, changing the grade of Ben Moreell, first four-star staff corps officer, from "civil engineer with rank of admiral" to simply "admiral".

==== Four-star caps ====
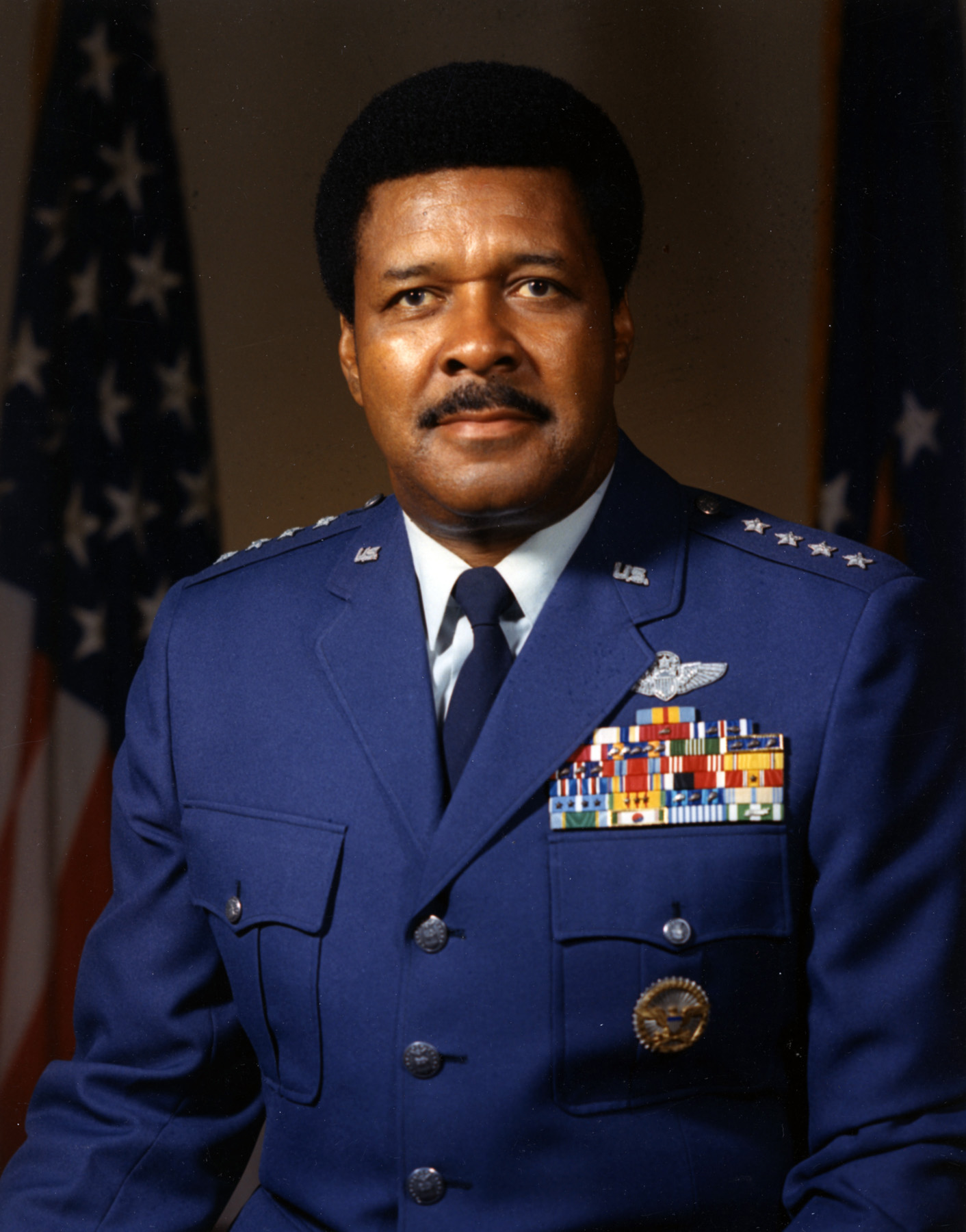
A temporary four-star position was created for General Daniel James Jr. after a heart attack forced him to relinquish his four-star command.

During peacetime, the Officer Personnel Act imposed strict numerical caps on the number of four-star positions. The Army and Navy originally proposed to keep appointing five-star service chiefs to oversee a peacetime total of 24 four-star officers: 9 Army generals, 8 Navy admirals, 6 Air Force generals, and 1 Marine Corps general. The House Armed Services Committee slashed this total to 11 four-star officers, reserved five-star ranks for wartime, required for the first time that all three- and four-star officers be confirmed by the Senate, and let them retire in those grades without additional legislation. The final bill authorized 15 four-star officers except during war or national emergency:

- 5 Army generals, including the chief of staff;
- 4 Navy admirals, including the chief of naval operations;
- 4 Air Force generals, including the chief of staff;
- 1 Marine Corps general serving as commandant; and
- 1 additional officer serving as chief of staff to the president.

Congress specified four-star rank only for the service chiefs and chief of staff to the president, leaving the other 10 four-star positions undefined but expected to be, at least initially: in the Army, the vice chief of staff and commanding generals of occupation forces in Europe and Japan and of Army Ground Forces in the United States; in the Navy, the commanders in chief of the Atlantic Fleet, Pacific Fleet, and naval forces in Europe; and in the Air Force, the vice chief of staff and commanding generals of Strategic Air Command and Air Materiel Command.

A second set of formulas capped the number of four-star officers during war or national emergency. The Army and Air Force formula let each service designate a number of positions to carry ranks above major general, up to 15 percent of its total number of general officers on active federal military duty. Of those positions, up to 25 percent could carry the rank of general. The Navy formula authorized 15 percent of flag officers in the line of the Regular Navy to serve in grades above rear admiral, including up to 8 in the grade of admiral. Even when these formulas were suspended during the Korean War emergency, the services hewed closely to them to appease the Senate committees that still had to confirm any four-star promotion.

If a service was operating below its four-star grade cap, as was the case for the Army and Air Force until the late 1970s, it might designate ad hoc four-star positions for existing four-star officers to smooth transitions between jobs or to retirement. For example, when Lyman Lemnitzer needed extra time on active duty to finish debriefing after stepping down as Supreme Allied Commander Europe in 1969, the president assigned him as special assistant to the chairman of the Joint Chiefs of Staff for two months and designated that position as one of importance and responsibility warranting the grade of general. In 1977, the Air Force twice created a temporary four-star position of special assistant to the Air Force chief of staff, to avoid demoting Air Force generals Russell E. Dougherty and Daniel James Jr. while they were being medically processed for retirement after suffering heart attacks while commanding Strategic Air Command and North American Aerospace Defense Command, respectively.

==== World War II exemptions ====
The peacetime caps imposed by the Officer Personnel Act would have removed a star from the 3 four-star Army generals commanding field armies in the United States (Mark W. Clark, Thomas T. Handy, and Courtney Hodges) and the 2 four-star Navy admirals other than the chief of naval operations who were not commanding major fleets (Thomas C. Kinkaid and Henry K. Hewitt). To avoid demoting the high commanders of World War II, Congress exempted from the caps every four-star officer in the Army and Navy promoted to that rank before the end of the war, until July 1, 1950. The Air Force was not included in this exemption, so when George Kenney and Joseph T. McNarney were allowed to carry their fourth stars to their next assignments, having both won that rank during the war, their former commands of Strategic Air Command and Air Materiel Command had to be downgraded to three stars.

==== Korean War emergency ====
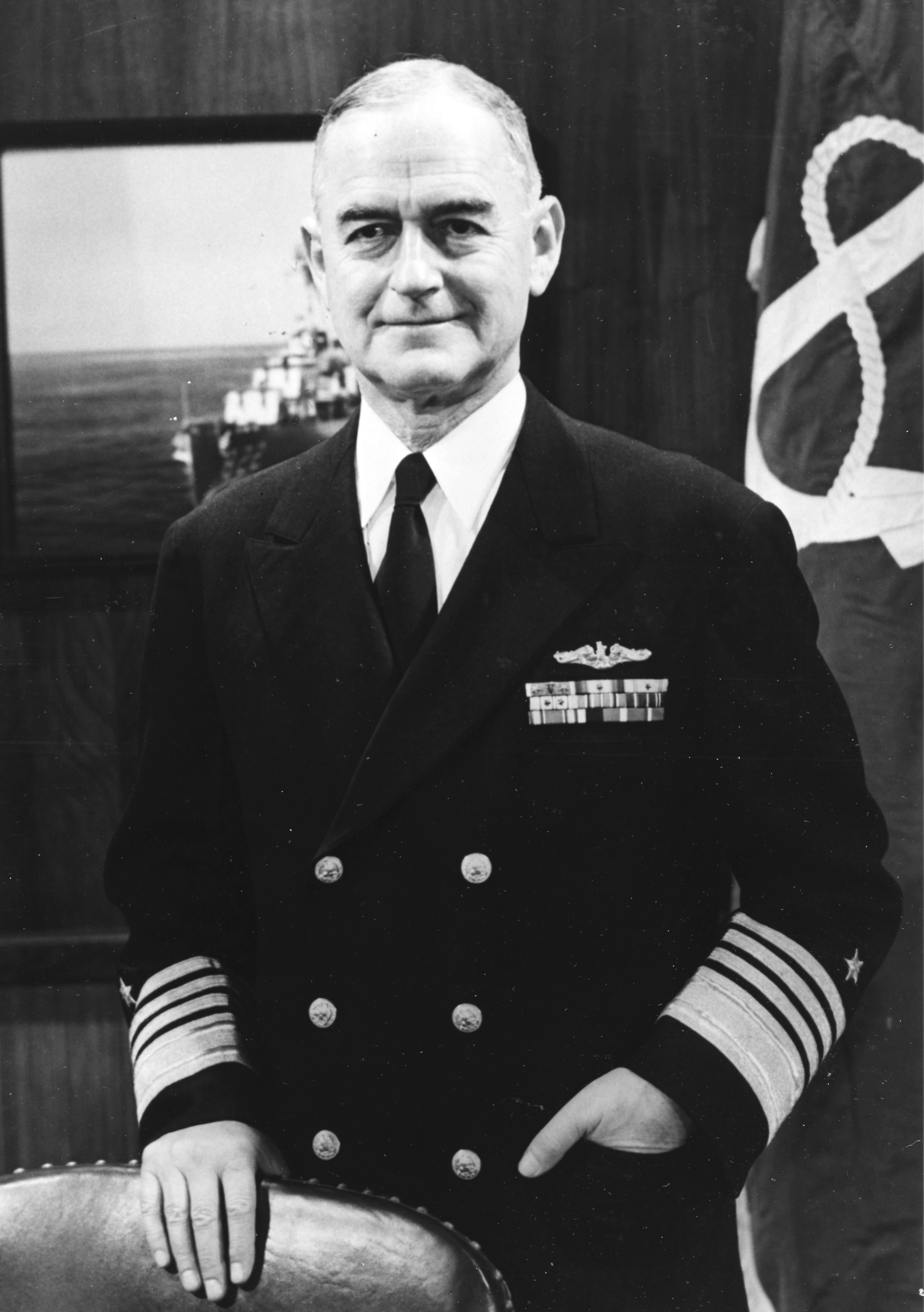
Vice chief of naval operations Lynde D. McCormick received a fourth star in 1950 when the declaration of the Korean War emergency doubled the number of four-star admirals allowed in the Navy.

The peacetime caps on four-star officers were relaxed by the national emergency that was declared for the Korean War on December 16, 1950. Under the Officer Personnel Act, a national emergency doubled the Navy's four-star authorization from 4 to 8. The Navy promptly made the vice chief of naval operations an admiral, matching the rank of the Army and Air Force vice chiefs. When the various military and naval laws were consolidated into Title 10 of the United States Code in 1956, the President received authority to suspend even the higher caps on Navy four-star admirals during a national emergency, which he invoked by executive order in 1960 for the duration of the Korean War emergency. For the Army and Air Force, a national emergency removed all legislative caps on temporary three- and four-star appointments, which were limited only by the Senate's willingness to confirm and fund them.

==== Davis amendment ====
The Officer Personnel Act placed no statutory cap on temporary promotions in the Army and Air Force. Theoretically, the Army and Air Force could promote all their officers to temporary general as long as the Senate Armed Services Committee was willing to approve their nominations and the House and Senate Appropriations Committees to fund their pay, an observation that provoked House Appropriations Committee member Glenn R. Davis to attach an amendment to the 1953 defense appropriation act to withhold pay for the fourth quarter of the fiscal year from officers in each grade exceeding fixed percentages of total military personnel.

Intended as a stopgap measure by the Appropriations Committees to prod the Armed Services Committees into action, the Davis amendment was supposed to lock in the current grade distribution, not disrupt it. However, the Navy accidentally underreported its required proportion of lieutenants to Davis when he drafted his amendment, so to save about 5,000 Navy lieutenants from being demoted or discharged, Congress repealed the law in March 1953 with the understanding that the Armed Services Committees would now develop a permanent solution. No such solution had appeared by the time the 1954 defense appropriation act was being drafted in June, so the House Appropriations Committee renewed the Davis amendment with corrected numbers. The Davis amendment was repealed by the Officer Grade Limitation Act that the House Armed Services Committee finally produced in March 1954.

==== Officer Grade Limitation Act ====
The Officer Grade Limitation Act (OGLA) of 1954 laid out a comprehensive system of sliding-scale ceilings on active-duty officers in each grade, such that the higher the total officer strength, the lower the proportion of senior officers, and vice versa. This replaced the annual Davis amendments, which had imposed a fixed grade distribution that scaled poorly as total officer strength expanded and contracted during war and peace. No new controls were placed on three- and four-star appointments, which already had to be approved by the president and confirmed by the Senate and were limited to fixed percentages of the new sliding-scale ceilings on general and flag officers.

For general and flag officer grades, Congress imposed additional caps that were almost always lower than the OGLA ceilings. Whereas the House Appropriations Committee limited those grades by enacting Davis amendments to withhold funding, the Senate Armed Services Committee capped the number of general and flag officer nominees it would approve in each service, under a rule informally dubbed the Stennis ceiling after the powerful committee member who enforced it, John C. Stennis. Invented in August 1951 and revised in 1955, the Stennis ceiling imposed numerical caps on general and flag officers that were much lower than the OGLA ceiling until 1971, when the OGLA ceiling finally dropped below the Stennis ceiling as officer strength drew down from its Vietnam War peak.

==== National Emergencies Act ====
The Korean War emergency and its higher four-star caps persisted until 1976, when the National Emergencies Act finally terminated all existing national emergencies effective September 14, 1978. By then the Navy was employing all 8 of its emergency four-star authorizations under the Officer Personnel Act, plus 1 more under the 1960 executive order (or 2 more if it was the Navy's turn to provide the four-star U.S. military representative to the NATO Military Committee). To prevent the return to peacetime caps from demoting half of the Navy's four-star admirals, the 1978 defense appropriation authorization act changed the Navy's four-star cap to be a percentage of the number of flag officers on the active list, using the same formula employed by the Army and Air Force (15 percent above two-star rank, of which at most 25 percent at four-star rank, or 3.75 percent of all flag officers). This worked out to 9 four-star admirals, given the 261 flag officers on active duty in 1978.

A week before the new formula became law, the Navy downgraded U.S. Naval Forces Europe to three stars, matching the recent reduction of Pacific Air Forces to three stars and reducing the total number of four-star admirals to 9, as required. This included the director of naval nuclear propulsion, Hyman G. Rickover, after 1978, when the four-star caps were extended to all officers on active duty, not just on the active list.

==== Post-Vietnam War reductions ====
With American forces demobilizing as they withdrew from Vietnam in the early 1970s, Congress pressured the services to likewise cut the number of senior officers. In 1973, the House version of the annual defense appropriation bill withheld pay for the last quarter of Fiscal Year 1974 from flag and field grade officers exceeding specified grade caps in each service. The four-star caps were 14 Air Force generals, 13 Army generals, 10 Navy admirals, and 2 Marine Corps generals. The Department of Defense persuaded the House to drop that provision, saying that locking each service into a fixed number of four-star officers made it hard for the services to rotate joint billets like chairman of the Joint Chiefs of Staff. Instead, the 1975 defense appropriation bill applied the cap to the Department of Defense as a whole, denying pay for the last quarter of Fiscal Year 1975 to four-star officers exceeding 36 on active duty in all services. Congress dropped the rider in subsequent years after the services voluntarily reduced senior officer grades.

In 1977, the Department of Defense planned to have 1,165 general and flag officers, a ratio of 1 for every 1,800 active military members, as opposed to the 1 for every 2,600 military members at the height of the Vietnam War in 1968. The chairman of the Subcommittee on Manpower and Personnel of the Senate Armed Services Committee, Sam Nunn, proposed to cut general and flag officer authorizations by 20 percent over five years, starting in Fiscal Year 1978. The services naturally opposed this proposal, although Rickover advocated a more drastic reduction of 40 percent, including his own demotion. Rickover also wanted to limit the Army, Navy, and Air Force to only 4 four-star officers each, plus 1 in the Marine Corps, essentially reverting to the peacetime caps originally envisioned by the Officer Personnel Act before the Korean War.

The 1978 defense appropriation bill mandated a 6 percent reduction in the total number of general and flag officers from 1,141 to 1,073 by October 1, 1980. On September 30, 1978, there were 1,197 general and flag officers in the four military services—432 Army, 360 Air Force, 261 Navy, and 66 Marine Corps—enough for 16 Army generals, 13 Air Force generals, and 9 Navy admirals, plus the 2 Marine Corps generals authorized by statute. After the reduction, the Air Force was allotted 345 generals, enough for only 12.94 four-star generals.

=== Retirement ===
==== Retirement in highest grade ====
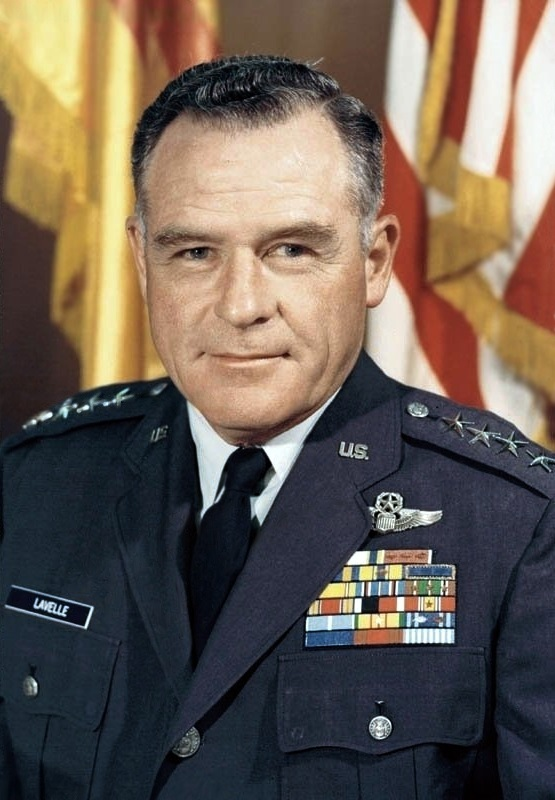
General John D. Lavelle lost his four-star job for conducting unauthorized airstrikes, and retired as a major general when the Senate refused to let him retire as a lieutenant general.

The Officer Personnel Act of 1947 permanently authorized the President to retire three- and four-star officers in their highest active-duty grades, with the consent of the Senate. Previously such officers retired in their permanent two-star grades unless Congress passed special legislation to the contrary. Since three- and four-star officers originally received the same retired pay as a two-star officer, the higher retired ranks were largely honorary until the O-9 and O-10 pay grades were created in 1958.

General John D. Lavelle was the only four-star officer in the Officer Personnel Act era to be retired in a lower grade, having conducted unauthorized airstrikes in Vietnam while four-star commander of the Seventh Air Force in 1972. Informed by Air Force chief of staff John D. Ryan that he would be relieved and assigned to a two-star position, Lavelle retired for disability instead. Because he still held his four-star position on the day he retired, he collected the retired pay of a four-star general even though he reverted to his permanent grade of major general on the retired list and the Senate Armed Services Committee rejected his nomination to retire as a lieutenant general. In 2010, Lavelle was posthumously nominated to be advanced to general on the retired list after declassified evidence from the Nixon White House tapes suggested he had prior authorization for the airstrikes, but the Senate Armed Services Committee again rejected his nomination. In 2024, Lavelle was finally made a lieutenant general on the retired list, but with the stipulation that his grade could not be elevated beyond that.

==== Tombstone promotions ====
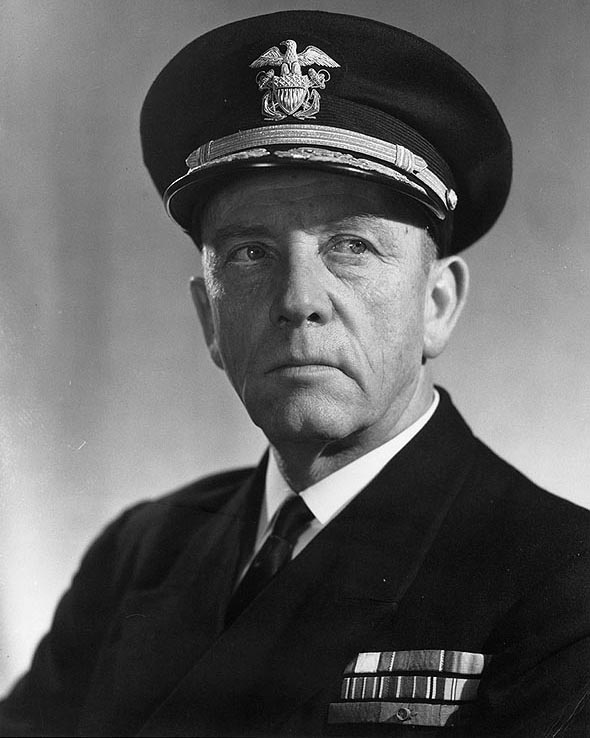
Alan G. Kirk received the first tombstone promotion to four-star admiral when he retired to accept a diplomatic appointment as ambassador to Belgium and Luxembourg.

From 1944 to 1959, dozens of three-star officers in the Navy and Marine Corps, and one in the Coast Guard, retired with honorary tombstone promotions to the rank but not the pay of the next higher grade, having been commended for performance of duty in actual combat before the end of World War II. Tombstone promotions for combat citations were first authorized in 1925 for Navy and Marine Corps officers who had been decorated during World War I but were too old to be promoted. By 1942, eligibility had broadened to cover any officer in a maritime service—Navy, Marine Corps, Coast Guard, or Coast and Geodetic Survey—with a combat citation from any time period. The Officer Personnel Act restricted tombstone promotions to citations for combat before January 1, 1947, coinciding with the end of World War II, and Congress eventually ended such promotions altogether, effective November 1, 1959.

In January 1944, a tombstone promotion made retiring Marine Corps commandant Thomas Holcomb the first four-star general in Marine Corps history. Navy vice admiral Alan G. Kirk received the first tombstone promotion to four-star admiral when he retired in March 1946 to become ambassador to Belgium and Luxembourg. Despite serving as Coast Guard commandant after the office was downgraded to three stars, a tombstone promotion gave Merlin O'Neill a fourth star anyway.

Tombstone promotions were not authorized for the Army and Air Force, so Congress enacted special legislation in 1954 to promote in retirement or posthumously any Army lieutenant general who during World War II had commanded a field army in a combat theater, or equivalent. In 1971, Congress authorized Marine Corps lieutenant general Keith B. McCutcheon to retire for disability with the equivalent of a tombstone promotion to general, after he was confirmed for a four-star appointment as assistant commandant of the Marine Corps but was too ill to take office.

A tombstone promotion for combat citations did not increase retired pay, but a 1958 military pay law let officers who were recalled to active duty in their tombstone grade to collect its retired pay after serving continuously in that grade for at least two years. Marine lieutenant general Gerald C. Thomas retired with a tombstone promotion to general, was recalled to active duty in that grade to serve on the National Security Council staff, and received the retired pay of a full general when he left active service two years later.

==== Posthumous promotions ====
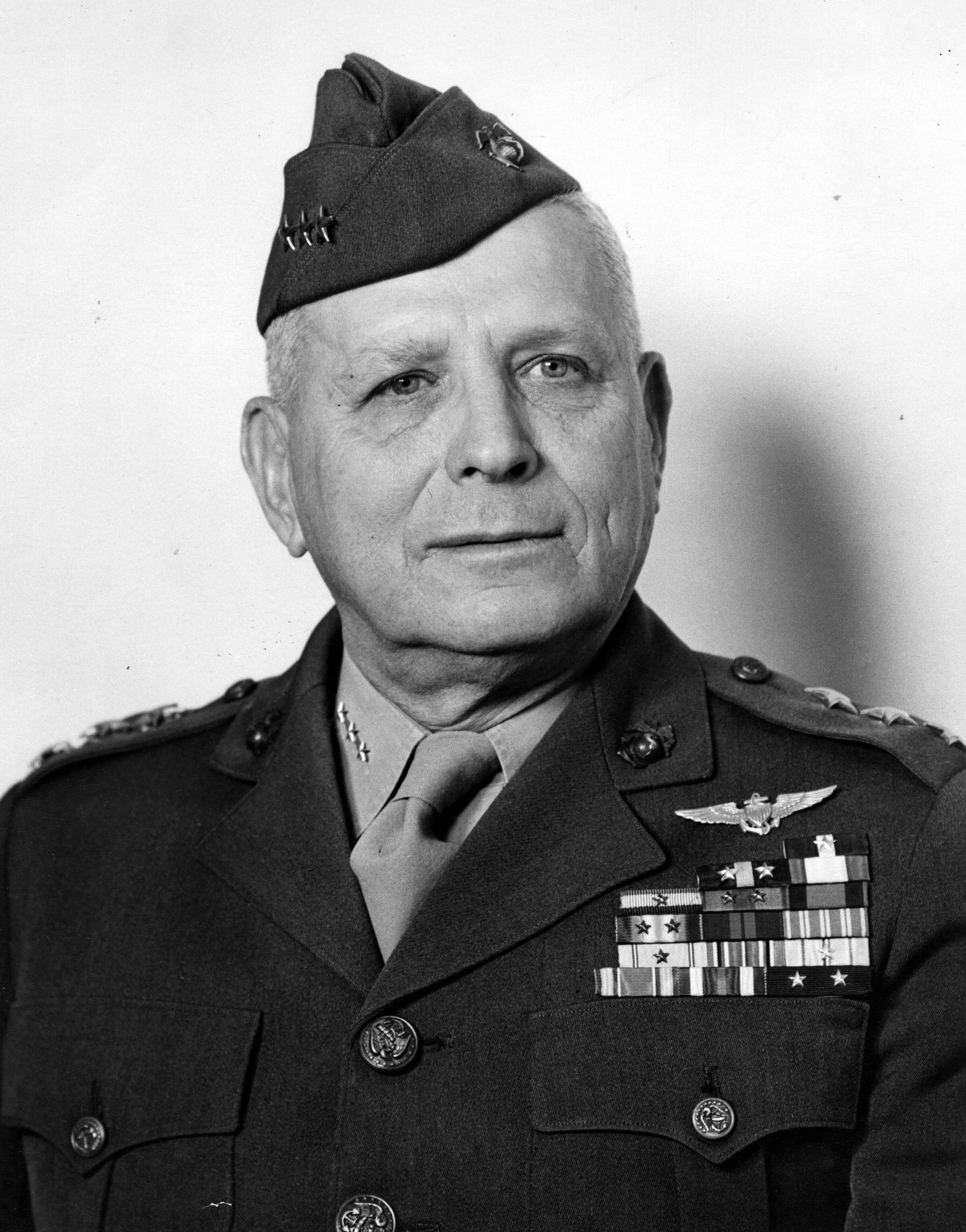
Marine lieutenant general Roy S. Geiger died a week before his scheduled tombstone promotion to four-star general, and was posthumously promoted to that rank.

On rare occasions, Congress awarded a posthumous fourth star to a three-star officer who would have been promoted to that rank had he not died prematurely. In 1947, special legislation promoted Marine Corps lieutenant general Roy S. Geiger, who had died of cancer only a week before he was scheduled to retire with a tombstone promotion; in 1949, Navy vice admiral John S. McCain, who had died of a heart attack less than a year before he could retire for age with a tombstone promotion; and in 1951, Lieutenant General Walton H. Walker, who had died in a traffic accident in the Korean War combat theater while his four-star promotion was still being processed. The chief of naval personnel recommended against singling out McCain with special legislation, observing that many other officers had died before receiving their tombstone promotions, including vice admirals entitled to four-star promotions like Willis A. Lee Jr. and Theodore S. Wilkinson, and instead recommended general legislation to cover all such officers, but to no avail.

In 1972, Air Force lieutenant general George B. Simler died in an airplane crash three days before assuming command of Military Airlift Command with a promotion to general, but received that grade posthumously under a law dating back to World War II that authorized posthumous commissions for officers who died in the line of duty before receiving a grade to which they had been promoted. The next year, Navy admiral Richard G. Colbert received a similar posthumous promotion on the permanent retired list after terminal cancer forced him to relinquish his four-star command and transfer to the temporary disability retired list in his permanent two-star grade, where he died before the Senate could confirm his nomination to retire in his highest active-duty grade.

==== Mandatory retirement (Army and Air Force) ====
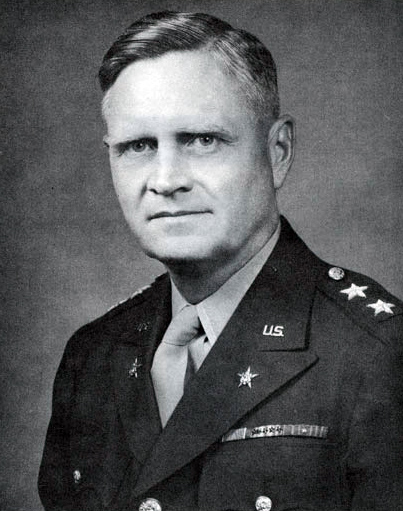
The Army tried to retire four-star general Thomas T. Handy at age 60, but he was retained until age 62 at the insistence of NATO supreme allied commander in Europe Dwight D. Eisenhower.

The Officer Personnel Act of 1947 gave the Army its first up-or-out promotion system, eliminating officers after a maximum number of years in each grade. Before 1947, Army officers were promoted by seniority up to the grade of colonel, with a mandatory retirement age of 60 for colonels, 62 for brigadier generals, and 64 for major generals. After World War II, the Army wanted to lower these ages to 58, 60, and 62, respectively, and 64 for higher grades. It also wanted major generals to retire after 5 years in grade, since the war raised many unusually young officers to that grade, especially in the Air Force, who would block the promotion flow if allowed to stay until 62.

The formula adopted by the Officer Personnel Act required Army and Air Force officers to retire after 5 years in the highest permanent grade of major general, or 35 years of active commissioned service, whichever was later, unless extended to age 60 by the secretary of the Army or Air Force. Permanent major generals with less than 5 years in grade or 35 years of service had a mandatory retirement age of 62. The secretaries of the Army and Air Force could retain until age 64 a combined total of 10 officers holding ranks or temporary grades above major general, but there was a general policy to avoid using this authority. The Army typically retained four-star generals until age 60, but the Air Force had a much younger general officer corps and adhered to the 35-year limit. A rare exception was Air Force general John K. Cannon, who retired in 1954 at age 62 after 37 years of service.

The complicated formula forced temporary three- and four-star generals to retire after 5 years as a permanent major general if not extended by the service secretary, surprising even experienced officers. In 1951, NATO supreme allied commander in Europe Dwight D. Eisenhower was shocked to be told that the four-star Army commander in chief in Europe, Thomas T. Handy, had to retire because he was about to turn 60 with more than 5 years in grade as a permanent major general. As Army chief of staff when the Officer Personnel Act was drafted in 1947, Eisenhower had never expected time in a two-star grade to force a three- or four-star general to retire, and told his successor as chief of staff, J. Lawton Collins, "What was actually intended was that promotion to 3 or 4-star grade would remove any compulsion for retirement—it was even my original intention to keep these very senior officers until 64." Collins protested that Eisenhower himself had established the policy of not keeping officers past age 60, having made only one exception while chief of staff to retain three-star Eighth Army commander Robert L. Eichelberger past age 62 in 1948, but Eisenhower insisted that Handy be extended until age 62 to serve as the first commander in chief of NATO's Central Army Group.

Deferred retirements became more common, though still rare, after Eisenhower became president in 1953. Four-star Eighth Army commanding general James A. Van Fleet reached five years in grade as permanent major general on January 24, 1953, only 4 days after Eisenhower's inauguration, as did three-star U.S. Army Europe commander in chief Manton S. Eddy, so outgoing Army secretary Frank Pace Jr. deferred their retirements for 60 days to leave the new president the option to retain or promote them, which he declined to exercise. Eisenhower did retain Generals William M. Hoge and John K. Cannon past their 60th birthdays, and successive chairmen of the Joint Chiefs of Staff, Generals Nathan F. Twining and Lyman Lemnitzer, were retained past age 62. Conversely, General Williston B. Palmer did transfer to the retired list upon turning 60 in 1959, but was almost immediately recalled to active duty to be four-star director of military assistance until 1962.

Statutory retirements sometimes camouflaged premature reliefs. In early 1955, policy disputes between Eisenhower and Army chief of staff Matthew Ridgway led to speculation that the president would let Ridgway's 60th birthday in March cut short his two-year term, scheduled to end in August, but Eisenhower deferred Ridgway's retirement. In January 1964, the administration tried to disguise the firing of the commander of U.S. forces in Vietnam, General Paul D. Harkins, as a routine retirement by letting him stay until he turned 60 in May, but had to schedule the change in command for August 1, his actual statutory retirement date for time in grade. The cover story was widely disbelieved and Harkins was abruptly relieved in June, seven weeks early.

==== Mandatory retirement (Navy and Marine Corps) ====
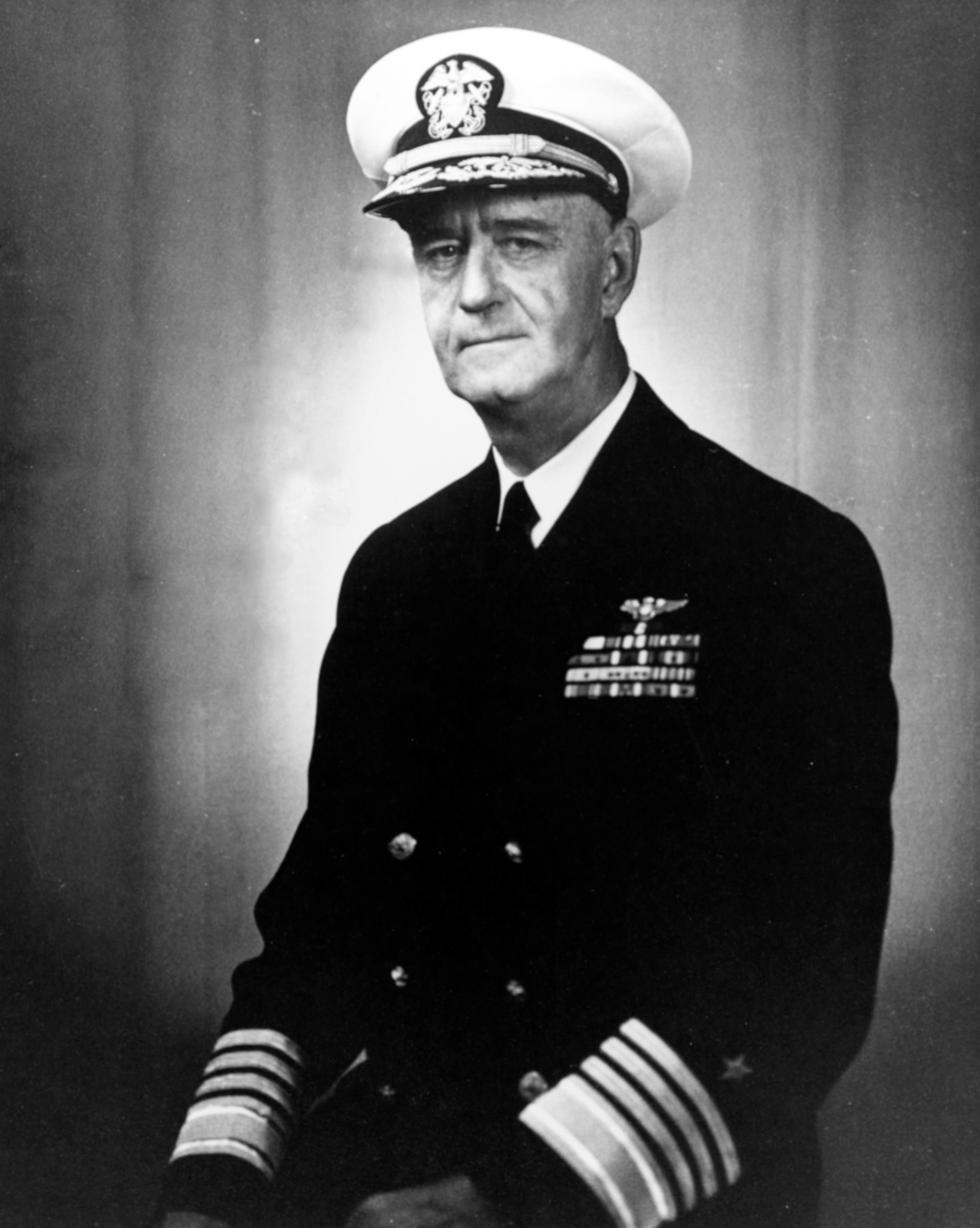
Admiral Felix B. Stump was held on the active list two years past the standard retirement age to lead a major reorganization of his four-star command.

The Officer Personnel Act required Navy officers to retire after completing 34 years of total commissioned service and 4 years in grade as rear admiral (increased to 35 and 5 years in 1950) unless selected by a retention board to continue on the active list until age 62. Unlike the other services, which had separate one-star and two-star general officer grades, the Navy had only one permanent flag officer grade, two-star rear admiral, which was divided for pay purposes into a lower and upper half (O-7 and O-8 pay grades). Since rear admirals automatically advanced from lower to upper half by seniority within the grade, without a second promotion, time in grade was based on promotion from captain.

Marine Corps major generals retired at age 62 until the Officer Personnel Act was amended in 1950 to force retirement after 35 years of commissioned service and 5 years in grade, like the Army and Air Force, unless recommended by a retention board to continue on the active list, like the Navy except on a year-to-year basis. An officer was exempted from the time-in-grade rule if serving as commandant of the Marine Corps.

Up to 10 Navy and Marine Corps officers above age 62 could remain on the active list until age 64, but this authority was rarely used. Admiral Felix B. Stump was continued for two years past his 62nd birthday in 1956 to oversee the separation of his dual-hatted command of the Navy's Pacific Fleet from the unified Pacific command. Vice Admiral Hyman G. Rickover had his retirement deferred until his 64th birthday in 1964, when he was transferred to the retired list and immediately recalled to active duty for a succession of two-year extensions (and eventual four-star promotion) until 1982.

==== Recall to active duty ====
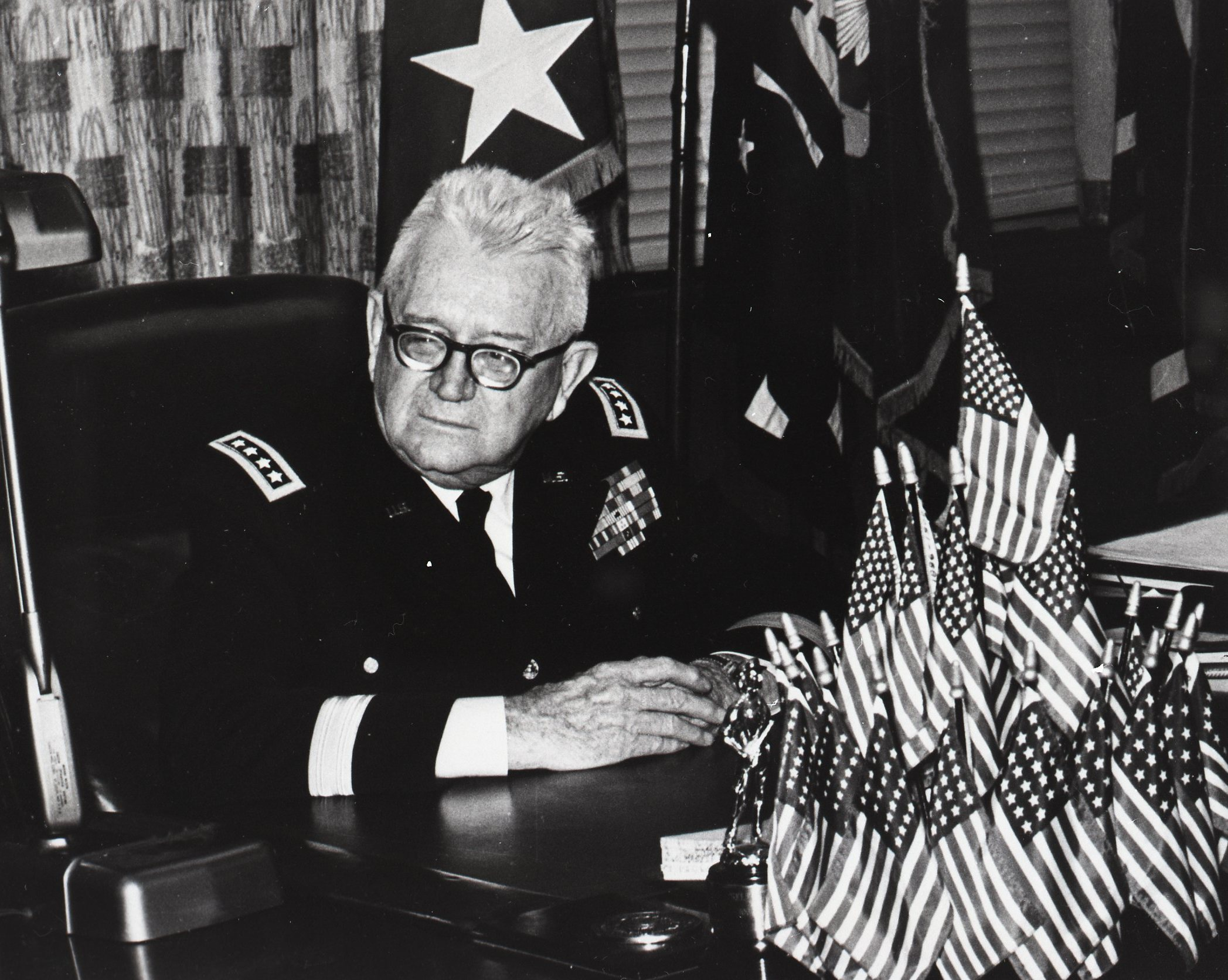
Retired Army officer Lewis B. Hershey was recalled to active duty and eventually promoted to four-star general.

Up to 10 retired or reserve flag officers in the Navy could be recalled to active duty at a time. Such officers were ineligible for the three- or four-star appointments authorized by the Officer Personnel Act, so in 1973, Congress explicitly authorized a fourth star for Vice Admiral Hyman G. Rickover, who had transferred to the retired list in 1964 but remained on active duty to direct the Navy's nuclear propulsion program until 1982. As a retired officer, Rickover was initially exempt from the Navy four-star grade caps in the Officer Personnel Act, which applied only to the active list of the Navy until Congress expanded them in 1978 to include any officer on active duty.

Retired general officers in the Army and Air Force could be recalled to active duty and promoted to temporary three- and four-star grades, but they were charged against the same grade caps as general officers on the active list. In 1969, the increasingly controversial director of the Selective Service System, retired Army lieutenant general Lewis B. Hershey, demanded a fourth star as his price for stepping down from his job without a fight. The 76-year-old Hershey had led that agency since 1941, having been retired and immediately recalled to active duty at the end of 1946. He was promoted to temporary general in February 1970 to serve as presidential advisor for military manpower mobilization, a sinecure from which he continued to resist draft reform until being involuntarily retired in April 1973 so the Army could reclaim his grade for another officer.

Once the Senate confirmed a four-star general's appointment to that grade on the retired list, he could be recalled to active duty in that grade without further congressional input or publicity. General Lyman Lemnitzer reached the mandatory retirement age of 64 on August 29, 1963, and transferred to the retired list on September 1 but remained on active duty as Supreme Allied Commander Europe (SACEUR) until 1969. Unusually, his continuation past age 64 was not publicly announced, to avoid giving the impression that NATO was being downgraded in importance by relegating its command to a retired officer. In 1974, retired Army general Alexander Haig, White House chief of staff during the Watergate scandal, was appointed SACEUR specifically because a retired four-star general could be appointed to that office without the controversy of a confirmation hearing, unlike the office of Army chief of staff.

==== Van Zandt amendment ====
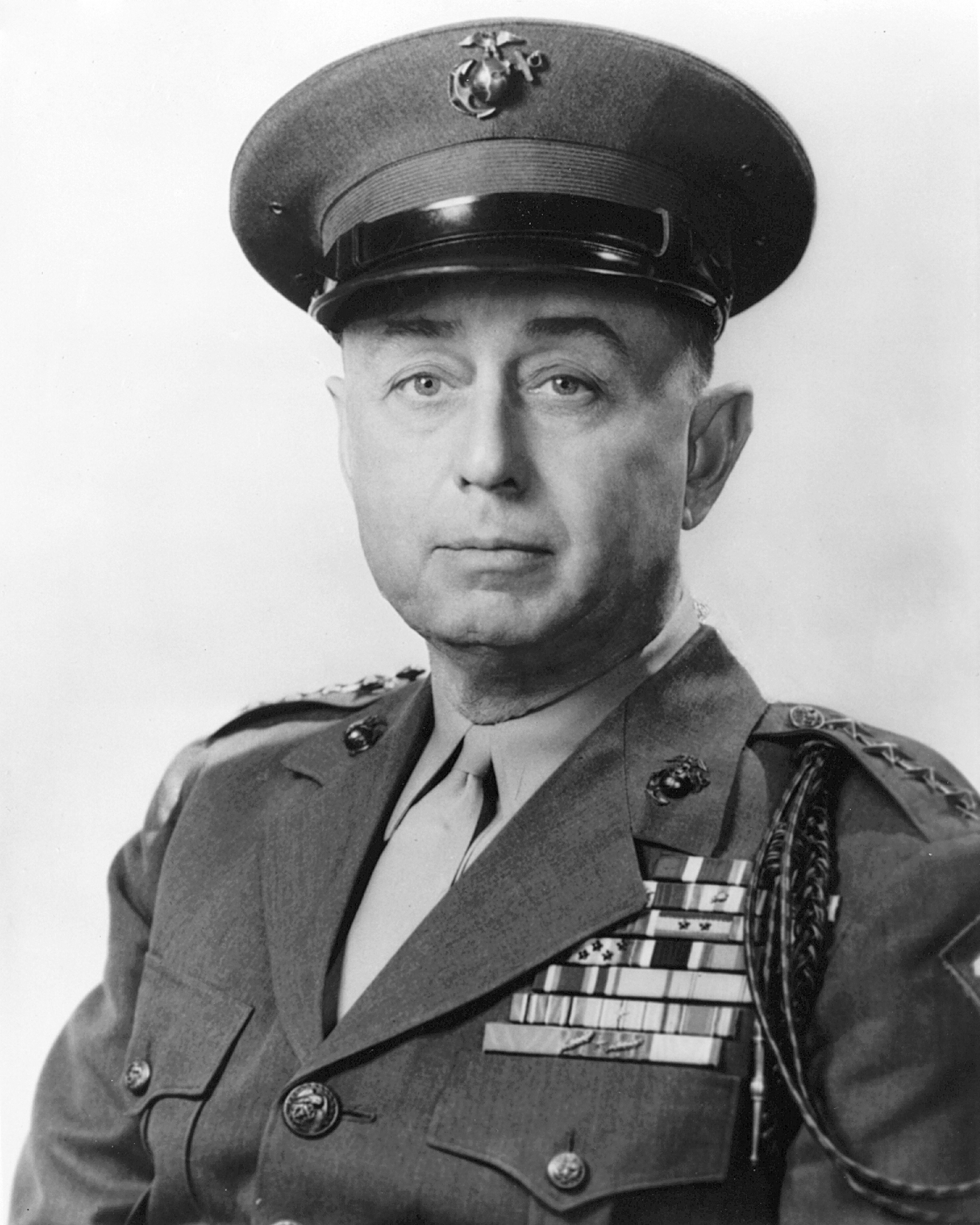
Clifton B. Cates reverted to three stars after his term as Marine Corps commandant after refusing to apply for an exemption from a law that withheld retired pay from officers below the statutory retirement age.

In 1951, incensed by reports that high-ranking officers like Air Force lieutenant general Elwood R. Quesada were retiring into lucrative industry jobs long before the statutory retirement age, at a time when reserve officers were being involuntarily ordered to active duty to fight the Korean War, Congressman James E. Van Zandt attached an amendment to the 1952 defense appropriation act that effectively froze voluntary officer retirements by withholding retired pay from any regular officer who retired for any reason other than age or disability, although the secretary of defense could make exceptions for hardship or the best interests of the service.

Upon being ordered in 1952 to revert to rear admiral in his next assignment, Navy vice admiral Thomas L. Sprague got a waiver from the secretary of defense to retire five years early on the grounds that clearing a vacancy for younger officers to move up was in the best interests of the service, salvaging his tombstone promotion to four-star admiral by retiring while still a vice admiral.

When President Dwight D. Eisenhower replaced his predecessor's Joint Chiefs of Staff with his own appointees in 1953, outgoing Army and Navy chiefs J. Lawton Collins and William M. Fechteler were both several years short of the statutory retirement age and would have needed waivers from the secretary of defense to retire with pay. Instead they accepted four-star NATO assignments outside the United States national chain of command, Collins as United States military representative to the NATO Military Committee (USMILREP) and Fechteler as commander in chief of Allied Forces Southern Europe (CINCSOUTH). Outgoing Marine Corps commandant Clifton B. Cates refused to apply for a waiver and remained on active duty as a three-star general until the Officer Grade Limitation Act repealed the Van Zandt amendment in 1954.

=== Compensation ===
==== O–10 pay grade ====
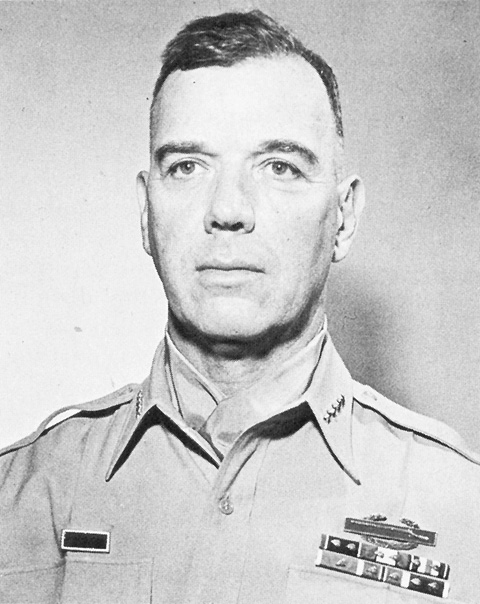
General James A. Van Fleet retired for the second time on the day the O-10 grade was created, entitling him to its retired pay.

The Career Compensation Act of 1949 defined officer pay grades ranging from O-1 to a maximum of O-8 for a major general or rear admiral, the highest permanent grade to which an officer could be promoted on the active list under the Officer Personnel Act. Three-, four-, and five-star officers also held the O-8 pay grade, but got annual personal money allowances of $500 for a three-star officer, $2,200 for a four-star officer, $4,000 for a service chief, and $5,000 for a five-star officer. The Career Incentive Act of 1955 further differentiated three- and four-star officers by incrementing their monthly basic pay by $100 and $200, respectively, but allowances and pay increments were not creditable toward retirement, so three- and four-star officers received the same O-8 retired pay as a two-star officer, which was capped at 75 percent of the basic pay of a major general.

The Military Pay Act of 1958 created O-9 and O-10 pay grades for three- and four-star officers, as recommended by the Defense Advisory Committee on Professional and Technical Compensation in the Armed Forces chaired by General Electric president Ralph J. Cordiner, or Cordiner Committee. Instead of O-8 basic pay plus a pay increment, three- and four-star officers were simply given higher O-9 or O-10 basic pay to begin with, and members of the Joint Chiefs of Staff received even higher pay within the O-10 grade, in addition to the personal money allowances. Officers could retire with up to 75 percent of their highest basic pay, finally giving four-star officers higher retired pay than two-star officers.

As part of the transition to the new O-9 and O-10 pay grades, Congress meant to allow retired three- and four-star officers who held those ranks between 1955 and 1958 to recompute their retired pay to include the corresponding monthly pay increment from 1955. However, the wording of the Military Pay Act extended that privilege to any former three- or four-star officer who served in that rank for at least 180 days, even if he retired before 1955 and never received the pay increment, and even if he retired at a lower rank, in the case of Husband E. Kimmel, who retired as a rear admiral in 1942 after being relieved as four-star commander in chief of the Pacific Fleet following the attack on Pearl Harbor. As a former four-star admiral, Kimmel's recomputed pay turned out to be comparable to a retired O-9, despite being only a two-star admiral on the retired list.

An unexpected beneficiary of the 1958 pay grades was General James A. Van Fleet, who had retired at the O-8 pay grade in 1953. His physical examination for retirement revealed a growth that became cancerous the next year, which let him change his retirement to be for disability instead of age, thereby increasing his retired pay. After a successful surgery, Van Fleet was found to be physically fit for active duty in March 1958, but in order to leave the temporary disability retired list, he had to be recalled to active duty, reappointed to his former permanent grade of major general on the active list, and again retired for age in the grade of general. Fortuitously, the O-10 grade was created on the same day Van Fleet retired for the second time, entitling him to O-10 retired pay instead of O-8.

In 1962, a chairman of the Joint Chiefs of Staff and former Army chief of staff, General Lyman Lemnitzer, was reassigned as Supreme Allied Commander Europe (SACEUR), thereby incurring a pay cut of about $325 per month since SACEUR was compensated at the standard O-10 rate. Defense secretary Robert McNamara twice submitted legislation to give SACEUR the same elevated pay as the members of the Joint Chiefs of Staff, but Congress never acted on it.

==== Permanent four-star officers ====
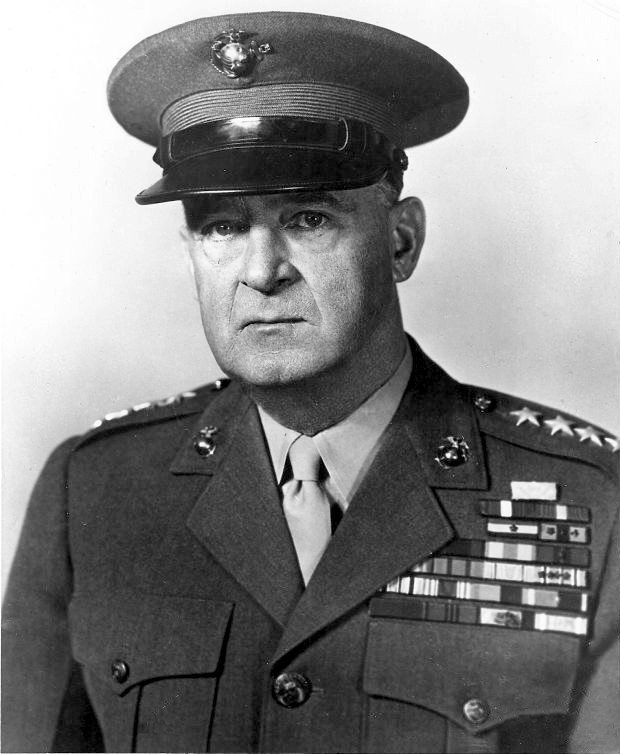
Marine Corps general Alexander Vandegrift received a permanent four-star promotion on the active list that included full active-duty pay and allowances in retirement.

After World War II, all temporary five-star officers and one temporary four-star officer from each service were rewarded with permanent promotions to those grades on the active list, including full active-duty pay and allowances in retirement, the first such promotions since John J. Pershing was appointed General of the Armies after World War I. Permanent four-star promotions went to Army general Omar Bradley, Navy admiral Raymond A. Spruance, Air Force general Carl Spaatz, Marine Corps general Alexander Vandegrift, and Coast Guard admiral Russell R. Waesche. Bradley was later promoted to permanent five-star general while serving as the first chairman of the Joint Chiefs of Staff. These officers constituted a third pay category, besides active and retired officers, that was deliberately excluded from most military pay raise bills between 1955 and 1973, by which time Bradley's permanent five-star compensation was about the same as a newly retired one-star general.

Other temporary four-star officers received permanent promotions only on the retired list, which did not increase retired pay until the O-10 pay grade was created in 1958, since four-star officers received the same base pay as two-star officers, plus a personal money allowance. The personal money allowance was higher for a service chief or chairman of the Joint Chiefs of Staff, creating a hierarchy of four-star officers. When devising retired pay rates in 1963, the House Armed Services Committee wanted to reserve the highest retired pay for a former president (Eisenhower), followed by other five-star officers (MacArthur, Nimitz, Bradley), permanent four-star officers (Spaatz, Spruance, Vandegrift), retired members of the Joint Chiefs of Staff, and other retired four-star officers.

When Bradley's successor as chairman, Navy admiral Arthur W. Radford, retired in 1957, the Defense Department submitted a bill to appoint Radford to the permanent grade of admiral with the pay and allowances of a chairman of the Joint Chiefs of Staff, and to receive the same pay and allowances in retirement as an active-duty admiral serving as chairman of the Joint Chiefs of Staff. This would have given him $1,828 per month, more than twice the standard retirement of three-quarters of the base pay of his permanent grade of rear admiral (upper half) and no allowances, or $807 per month. The House Armed Services Committee reduced this to full pay and allowances of a rear admiral (upper half), or $1,295 per month. The House passed the bill but the Senate never acted on it.

==== Pay cap ====
In 1967, Congress provided that any increase in the General Schedule for federal civil service compensation resulted in a comparable increase in military pay. Since civil service salaries were capped at Level V of the Executive Schedule by the Federal Salary Act of 1967, the Federal Pay Comparability Act of 1970 was interpreted as likewise capping military basic pay. For example, Executive Order 11692, which set military pay rates effective January 1, 1974, specified that monthly basic pay for members of the Joint Chiefs of Staff was nominally $3,745 but actually capped at the $3,000 of Executive Schedule Level V.

By 1999, the Executive Schedule cap had so compressed the pay table that there was almost no difference in pay between O-9 lieutenant generals and vice admirals, O-10 generals and admirals, and O-10 members of the Joint Chiefs of Staff.

==== Double dipping ====
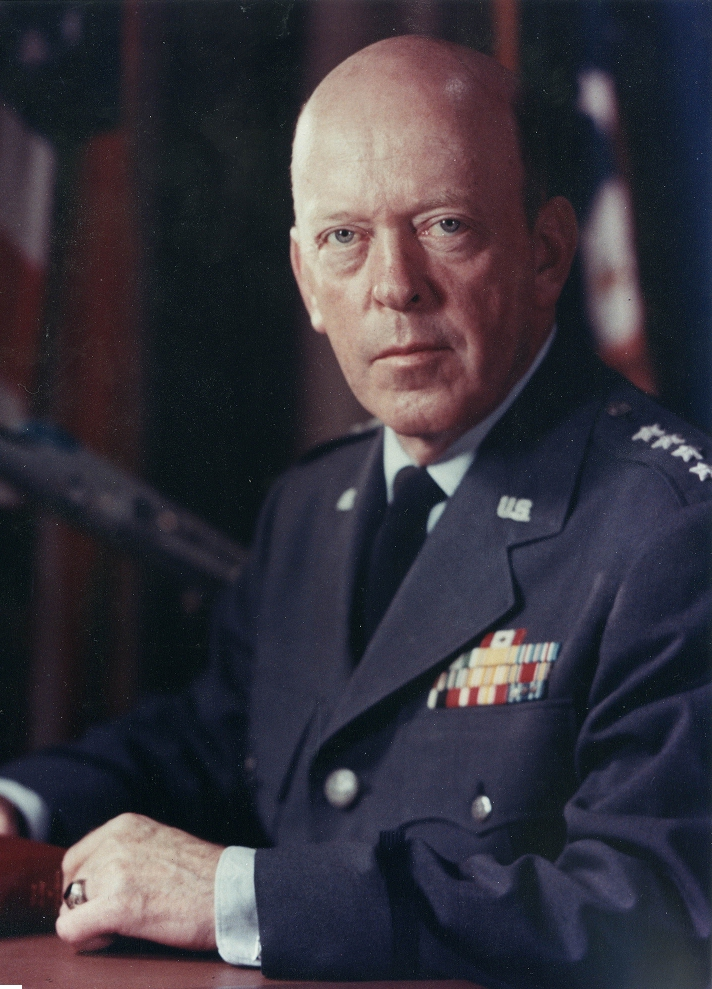
As head of the Federal Aviation Administration, retired Air Force general William F. McKee was the third-highest-paid official in the executive branch, after only the president and vice president.

The Dual Compensation Act of 1964 allowed retired military officers to hold a civilian office without resigning their commissions, including the full salary of that office, but reduced their retired pay to $2,000 plus half of the remainder, to minimize double dipping. Prior to this act, an officer received no retired pay at all while drawing a civilian salary of $10,000 or more.

Of the eight retired four-star officers who held federal civilian jobs when the law took effect on December 1, 1964, half received exemptions that let them collect full retired pay on top of a full civilian salary. The four ambassadors (Army generals Maxwell D. Taylor and Herbert B. Powell, and Navy admirals Jerauld Wright and George W. Anderson Jr.) had their retired pay reduced, but the governor of the U.S. Soldiers Home (Army general Wade H. Haislip) was exempted by a prior dual compensation law, the director of telecommunications policy in the Defense Department (Navy admiral Maurice E. Curts) was exempted because he retired for combat disability, and two NASA executives (Air Force general William F. McKee and Navy admiral Walter F. Boone) were included in the 30 exemptions controlled by the NASA administrator. McKee left NASA in 1965 to be administrator of the Federal Aviation Agency, whose salary combined with his reduced military pension made him the third-highest paid official in the executive branch of the federal government, after only the president and vice president.

Even at reduced retired pay, by 1978 double-dipping military officers were the highest-paid officials in the federal government except for the president. Of the 81 retired generals and admirals with a full-time job in the federal government, 51 had a combined civil service salary and military pension greater than the $66,000 annual salary of the Cabinet member for whom they worked, and 34 made more than the $75,000 of the vice president. For example, deputy undersecretary of defense for policy review Daniel J. Murphy collected more than $80,000 a year by augmenting his Executive Schedule Level IV salary with the pension of a retired four-star admiral.

The Civil Service Reform Act of 1978 changed the dual compensation formula so that a combined civil service salary and military pension could not exceed Level V of the Executive Schedule, an annual salary of $47,500 at the time. The law took effect on January 11, 1979, triggering director of central intelligence (DCI) Stansfield Turner, an active-duty four-star admiral, to retire from the Navy on December 31, 1978, but continue to serve as DCI, a maneuver that increased his compensation by 41 percent to almost $81,000 a year, including a $23,390 military pension that he would have forfeited under the new formula while collecting the $57,500 civilian salary of the DCI.

The 1964 and 1978 reductions in retired pay while double dipping were both repealed in 1999.

==== Recomputation of retired pay ====
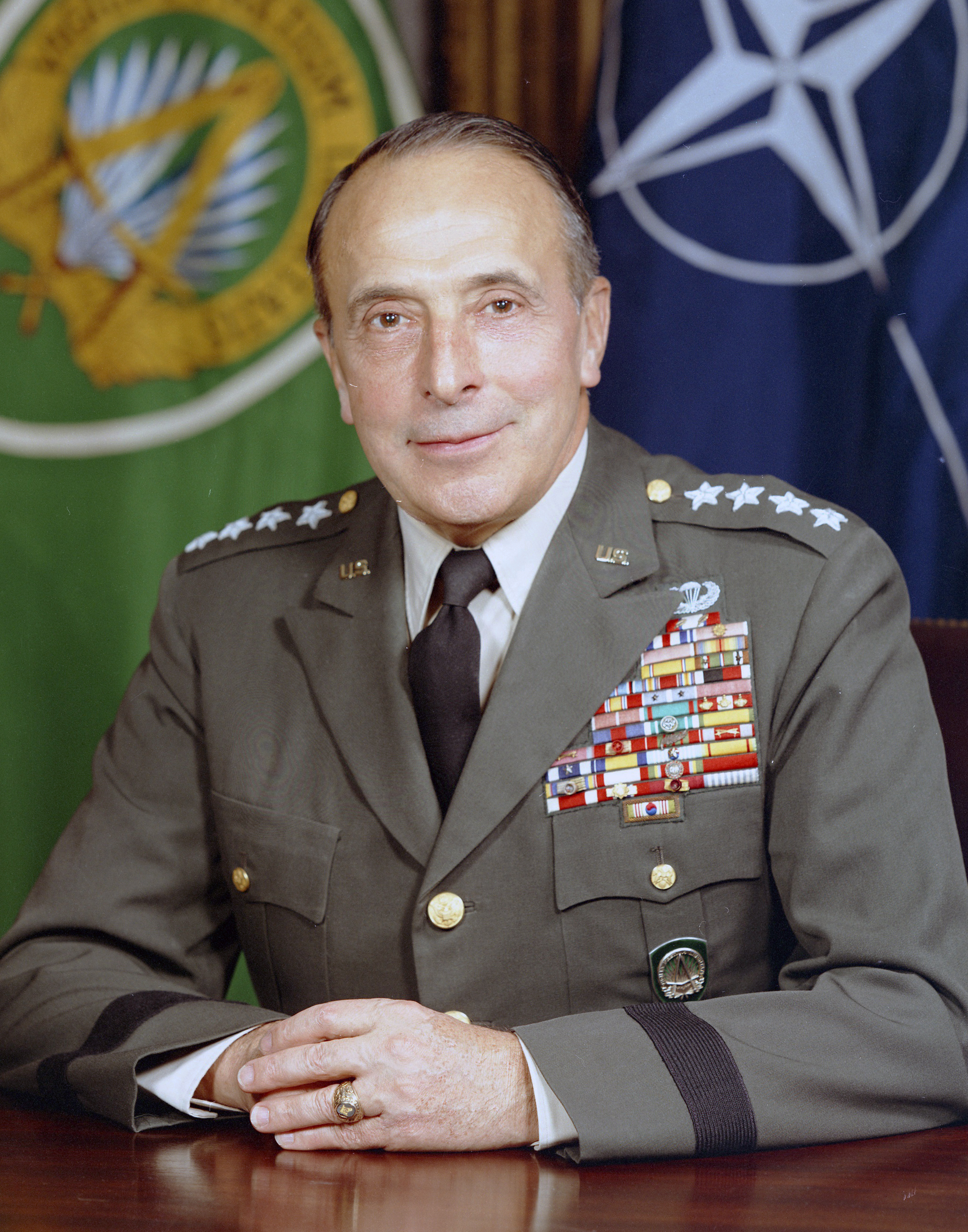
When he left active duty in 1969, General Lyman Lemnitzer received less retired pay than any other four-star officer who retired in that year.

Military personnel retired with up to 75 percent of their final active-duty pay, and were typically allowed to recompute their retired pay to reflect post-retirement increases in active-duty pay rates until 1958, when recomputation of retired pay was suspended by the same pay act that created the O-9 and O-10 grades. Subsequent increases in retired pay were tied to the consumer price index (CPI) in 1963, which increased more slowly than active-duty pay until the early 1970s, preserving an incentive for officers to retire later.

In 1963, General Lyman Lemnitzer transferred to the retired list upon reaching the mandatory retirement age of 64, but was immediately recalled to active duty to continue serving as Supreme Allied Commander Europe until 1969. Upon leaving active duty, he discovered that his retired pay was based on the active-duty pay of a four-star general in 1963, which he was not allowed to recompute using the higher pay of 1969. A section of a House procurement bill would have given Lemnitzer the same retired pay as a four-star general who retired in 1969, but the Senate struck it in conference. The House then passed his retired pay raise as a standalone bill, but it failed in the Senate after being caught up in the broader question of recomputing retired pay for all military retirees. Lemnitzer got higher retired pay anyway when Army doctors revised their diagnosis of his service-related hearing loss from 10 to 30 percent, enough to qualify him to retire for disability.

==== Disability pay ====
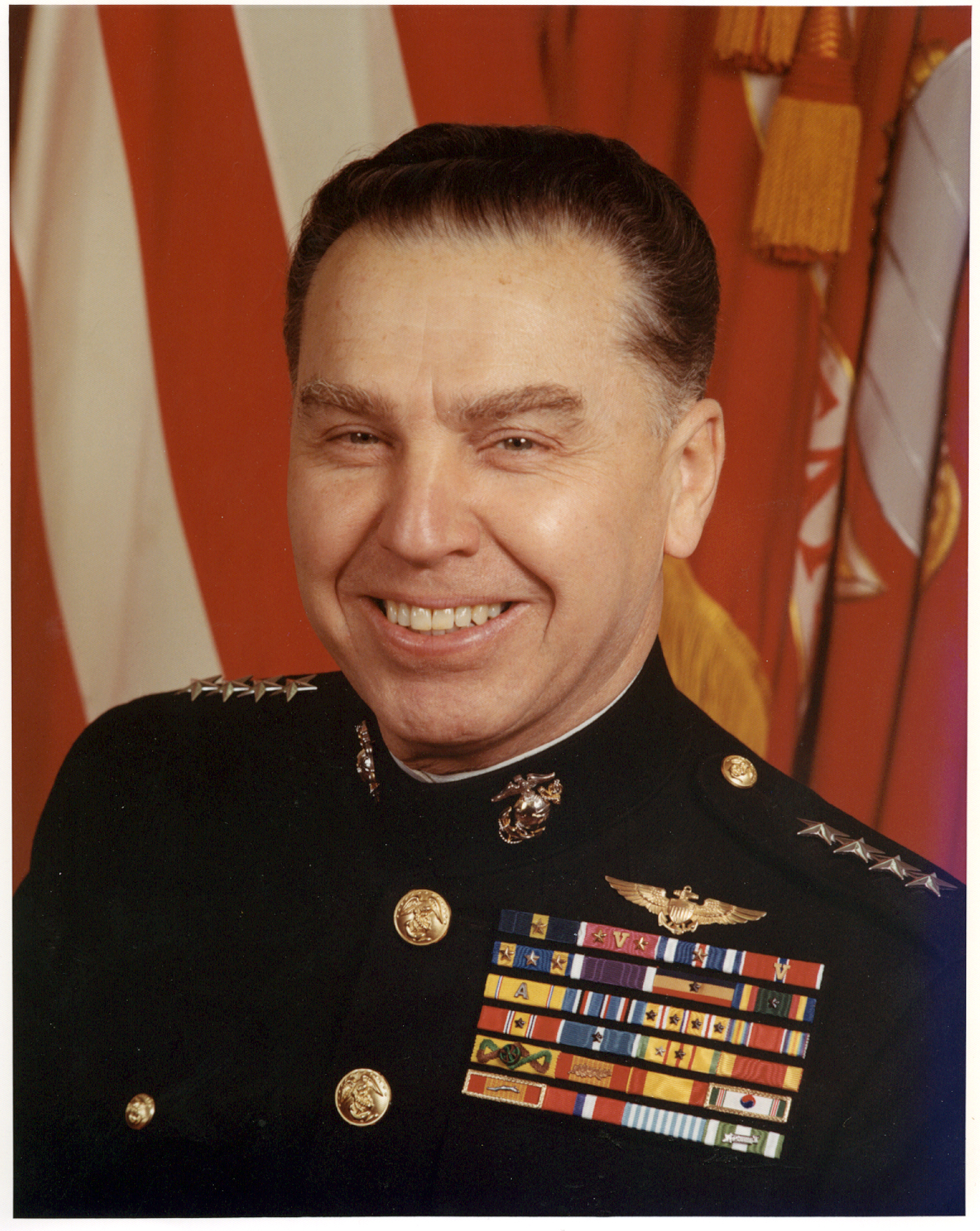
General Earl E. Anderson retired at 40 percent disability only weeks after being considered healthy enough to be a frontrunner for Marine Corps commandant.

Military personnel who retired with a service-related disability of at least 30 percent received tax-free a portion of their retired pay equal to the percentage of their disability multiplied by their final active-duty pay. For example, General John D. Lavelle retired at 70 percent disability and received an annual pension of about $25,000, 75 percent of his final active-duty pay as a four-star general, of which $23,500 was tax-free. Since Lavelle had retired as a major general in advance of being fired for ordering unauthorized airstrikes in Vietnam, the mostly tax-free pension of a four-star general seemed an incongruous reward, so the Senate Armed Services Committee rejected his nomination to be a lieutenant general on the retired list.

Another inconsistency was that Lavelle had been rated physically fit to fly combat missions while a four-star general, letting him collect flight pay, but was discovered to be 70 percent disabled for the purpose of retired pay. By June 1972, half of all retired four-star generals and admirals were rated at least partially disabled, including 27 of 36 retired Air Force generals. After being confronted by Congress, the Defense Department conceded that some senior officers might have been retired for disability incorrectly, either "for long and faithful service" or for medical conditions that were not disabling, and promised to tighten its rules to permit such retirements only when an impairment rendered an officer unfit for military service.

Less than three years later, General Earl E. Anderson chose to retire after being passed over to be next commandant of the Marine Corps, and was diagnosed at his preretirement physical with angina severe enough to retire at 40 percent disability, a decision confirmed by the secretary of the Navy over the objection of the top medical official in the Department of Defense, the assistant secretary of defense for health and environment (ASD (H&E)). Since Anderson had nominally been healthy enough to be a frontrunner for commandant and collect flight pay only a few weeks earlier, Congress concluded that the Defense Department's retirement guidelines were not preventing more Lavelle cases, and required that any disability retirement of a general, flag, or medical officer be approved by the secretary of defense on the recommendation of the ASD (H&E).

==== Retired pay inversion ====
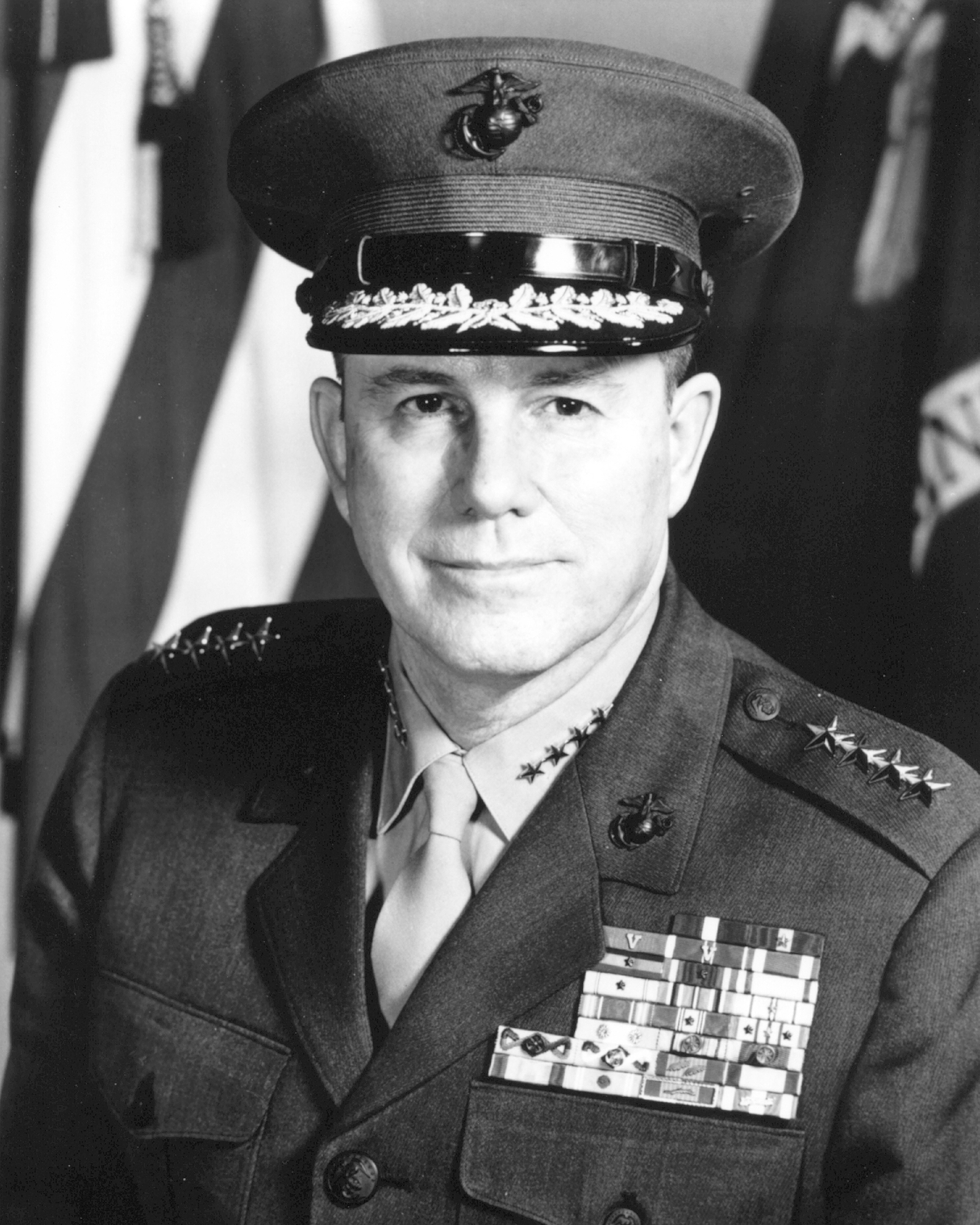
Marine Corps commandant Robert E. Cushman Jr. retired six months early to avoid a retired pay inversion that would cost him $300 a month for the rest of his life.

Retired pay inversion happened when an officer got less retired pay by serving on active duty longer, creating a perverse incentive to retire early. The Uniformed Services Pay Act of 1963 tied retired pay increases to the consumer price index (CPI) instead of recomputing them from active-duty pay raises, but starting in October 1972, inflation caused CPI-linked retired pay to grow faster than active-duty pay. Congress had passed a law in 1967 that was supposed to prevent any officer from receiving less retired pay than another officer with the same grade and years of service who retired earlier, including all intervening CPI increases, but in 1974 the Comptroller General ruled that the wording of the law actually entitled retired Air Force general David A. Burchinal to only the most recent CPI increase, creating a retired pay inversion that would cost four-star officers about $300 a month for the rest of their lives if they retired after September 1, 1975.

To beat the deadline, over 200 of the roughly 1,200 general and flag officers on active duty applied to retire in the first eight months of 1975—more than twice the number who retired in all of 1973—including four-star Navy admirals Worth H. Bagley and Means Johnston Jr., Air Force general John W. Vogt Jr., and Army general William B. Rosson. Marine Corps commandant Robert E. Cushman Jr. and assistant commandant Earl E. Anderson both decided to retire early after Cushman's recommendation that Anderson succeed him as commandant was rejected, and picked retirement dates before September 1 to avoid retired pay inversion.

The Defense Department tried to solve retired pay inversion with the Retirement Modernization Act, a comprehensive military retirement reform containing a generalized "save-pay" feature that said an officer could not receive less retired pay than any comparable officer who retired earlier. The Office of Management and Budget objected to the cost of this proposal, and it was resubmitted with an individualized "save-pay" feature that said an officer could not receive less retired pay than he himself could have received by retiring earlier. The Retirement Modernization Act never became law, but Senate Armed Services Committee member John Tower attached its individualized "save-pay" feature, dubbed the Tower amendment, to the 1976 defense appropriation authorization bill, which passed on October 7, 1975.

=== Positions ===
==== Air Force ====
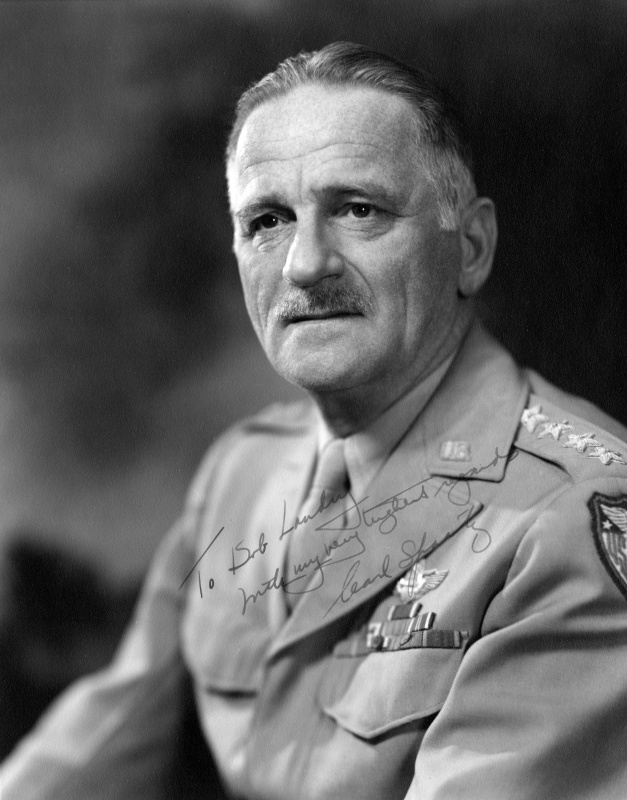
Army four-star general Carl Spaatz transferred to the newly established United States Air Force to be its first chief of staff.

The Officer Personnel Act gave 5 four-star officers to both the Army and the Navy (including the Marine Corps), but only 4 to the newly established Air Force. Three of the Air Force's allotment covered the four-star Army Air Corps generals who had not retired after the war and were transferred to the new service by the National Security Act of 1947, along with all other personnel in the Air Corps, Army Air Forces (AAF), and General Headquarters Air Force. AAF commanding general Carl Spaatz became the first Air Force chief of staff, Joseph T. McNarney became the first commanding general of Air Materiel Command (AMC), and George Kenney continued to command Strategic Air Command (SAC). The last slot elevated three-star AAF deputy commanding general Hoyt Vandenberg to four-star vice chief of staff.

By May 1950, the Air Force was lobbying Congress to grant it a fifth general to command Continental Air Command, and later that year submitted a draft Air Force Organization Act authorizing 7 generals: the chief and vice chief of staff and the commanding generals of AMC, SAC, Air Defense Command (ADC), Tactical Air Command (TAC), and an unspecified overseas command initially meant to be United States Air Forces in Europe (USAFE). The Air Force Organization Act passed in September 1951, designating ADC, SAC, and TAC as major commands, whose commanders were promoted to general three weeks later. By then, additional four-star appointments were already authorized by the Korean War emergency, so the final act did not provide four-star rank for any position other than the chief of staff, both to preserve flexibility and to let the Defense Department establish a uniform policy to allocate ranks across all services rather than have Congress manage them piecemeal. Within three years, the Air Force had all 7 generals it asked for in 1950, plus an eighth commanding Far East Air Forces (FEAF) in Korea.

By 1976 the Air Force had 13 four-star generals, including the chairman of the Joint Chiefs of Staff, who did not count against the four-star grade cap. Facing pressure from Congress to reduce senior officer grades after the Vietnam War, the Air Force downgraded Pacific Air Forces to three stars in 1977, and disestablished Aerospace Defense Command in 1980. The 1978 defense appropriation authorization act ordered a 6 percent cut in the total number of general and flag officers by October 1, 1980, reducing the Air Force to 345 general officers, enough for only 12.94 four-star generals under the Officer Personnel Act formula. With the Air Force next in line to provide a four-star U.S. military representative to the NATO Military Committee (USMILREP), NORAD was downgraded to three stars when its commander in chief retired at the end of 1979, allowing General Richard L. Lawson to become USMILREP a few months later. NORAD regained its fourth star after Lawson was reassigned as SHAPE chief of staff in 1981.

==== Navy ====
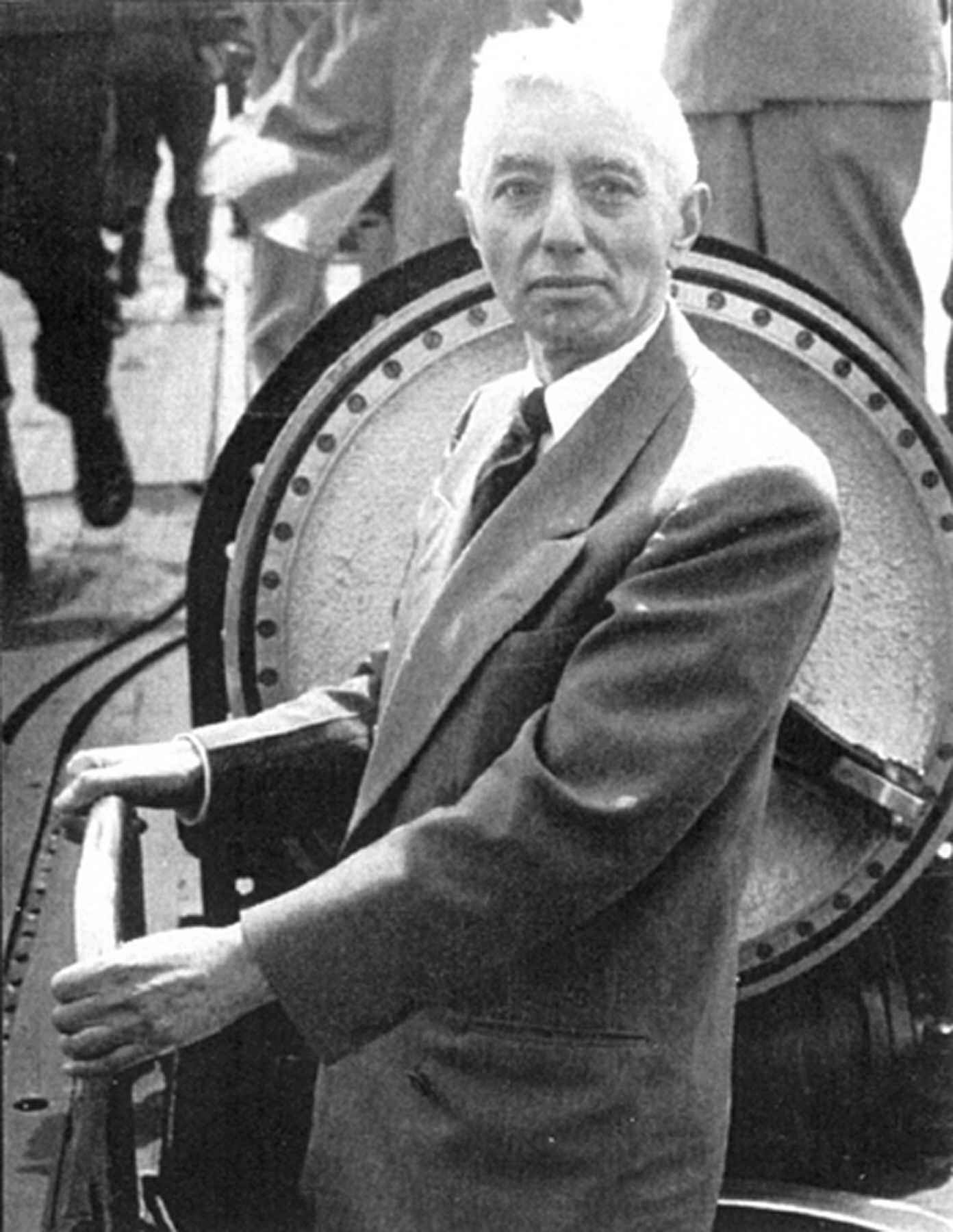
Congress passed special legislation to give a fourth star to retired Navy vice admiral Hyman G. Rickover.

Before World War II, the Navy had permanent authorization for 4 ex officio admirals: 1 ashore as chief of naval operations, and 3 afloat commanding the United States Fleet, Battle Force, and Asiatic Fleet. For the postwar establishment, the Navy asked for 6 admirals: 2 ashore as chief and vice chief of naval operations, one an aviator and the other a non-aviator; and 4 afloat commanding naval forces in the Pacific, the Atlantic, Europe, and China. The Navy argued that naval officers abroad needed commensurate rank with their foreign counterparts, and that each service should be allocated four-star officers according to its individual needs, not limited by how many were in the other services, and the Navy needed 6 admirals.

The Officer Personnel Act authorized 4 four-star admirals during peacetime, including the chief of naval operations. The other three were the commanders in chief of the Pacific Fleet, Atlantic Fleet, and naval forces in Europe. The Korean War emergency doubled the number of four-star authorizations to 8, which were eventually allocated to the vice chief of naval operations, the commanders in chief of NATO forces in southern Europe and the unified Pacific command, and the chief of naval material. A ninth admiral was created in 1973 when Congress passed special legislation to give a fourth star to the director of naval nuclear propulsion, Hyman G. Rickover, a retired officer not eligible for promotion under the Officer Personnel Act but also not subject to its grade caps. A tenth admiral was occasionally authorized by invoking the 1960 executive order that suspended all Navy four-star caps during an emergency, to let the Navy participate in the interservice rotation of the four-star United States military representative to the NATO Military Committee (USMILREP).

The National Emergencies Act of 1976 terminated all existing national emergencies effective September 14, 1978, so the 1978 defense appropriation authorization act changed the Navy's four-star cap to be a percentage of the number of flag officers on the active list, using the same formula employed by the Army and Air Force (15 percent above two-star rank, of which at most 25 percent at four-star rank, or 3.75 percent of all flag officers). This worked out to 9 four-star admirals, including Rickover, since the grade caps now applied to all officers on active duty, not just the active list. The number of permanent four-star billets was reduced to 8 in 1977 by downgrading the commander in chief of naval forces in Europe to three stars, freeing the ninth billet for the Navy's next turn to be USMILREP.

==== Army ====
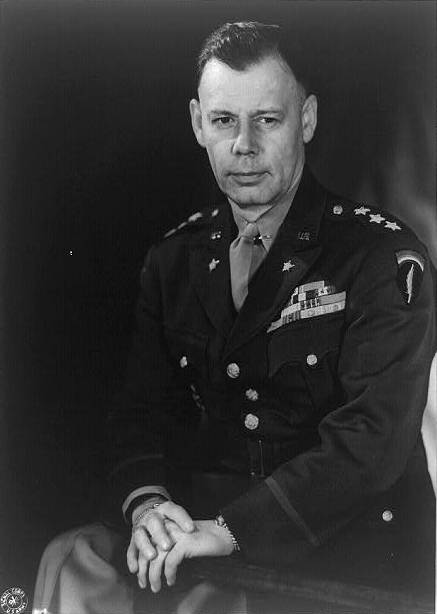
President Harry S. Truman refused to approve any Army four-star promotion list that did not include director of central intelligence Walter Bedell Smith.

Unlike the Air Force and Navy, the Army was initially content with its peacetime allotment of 5 four-star officers under the Officer Personnel Act, having had only 1 four-star officer before World War II. Its 5 postwar four-star designations went to the chief of staff, vice chief of staff, and commanding generals of Army Ground Forces and occupation forces in Germany and Japan.

The Korean War emergency unlocked the Army's alternate authority to use temporary grades to appoint four-star generals in excess of its peacetime grade cap. The first 3 additional temporary generals were appointed in summer 1951, after NATO supreme allied commander in Europe Dwight D. Eisenhower asked for a fourth star for the chief of staff of his Supreme Headquarters Allied Powers Europe (SHAPE), Alfred M. Gruenther. Army chief of staff J. Lawton Collins wanted Gruenther's promotion paired with a fourth star for the field army commander in the active combat theater in Korea, Eighth Army commanding general James A. Van Fleet. President Harry S. Truman threatened to block all promotions unless director of central intelligence (DCI) Walter Bedell Smith also received a fourth star, having blocked Smith from following Eisenhower to Europe the year before to be SHAPE chief of staff instead of Gruenther because Truman felt the DCI position was more important.

The Army operated well below its four-star grade cap during this period, giving it the flexibility to designate additional four-star positions to temporarily retain or avoid demoting existing generals. For example, after leaving Army Materiel Command in 1969, Frank S. Besson Jr. served as four-star chairman of the Joint Logistics Review Board until he retired in 1970. Creighton Abrams kept his four stars during the months after he relinquished command of U.S. forces in Vietnam in June 1972 to become Army chief of staff, a position for which he was not confirmed until October due to congressional concern about his responsibility for unauthorized airstrikes by his subordinate, Air Force general John D. Lavelle. In June 1978, Sam S. Walker lost his four-star NATO job to a Turkish general but kept his four stars while waiting for a pay raise to take effect in October so he could retire with a higher pension.

Escalating global commitments during the Cold War created more Army four-star generals, both at home and abroad. At the height of the Vietnam War in 1971, the Army had 17 four-star generals. A decade later, it had only 9 four-star generals.

==== Marine Corps ====
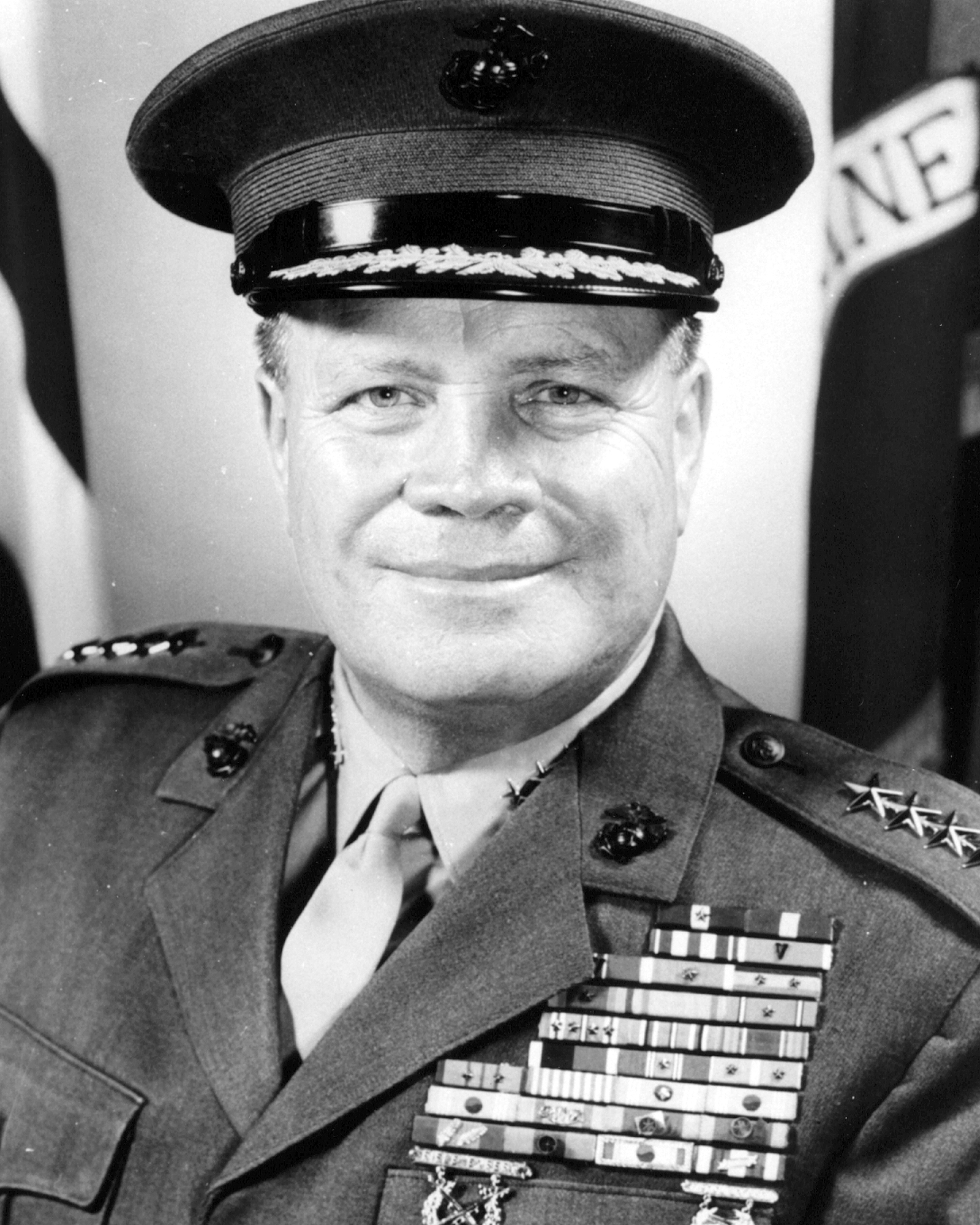
Marine Corps assistant commandant Lewis W. Walt, first officer to hold a four-star appointment in the Marine Corps other than commandant.

The Officer Personnel Act authorized the president to designate positions of importance and responsibility to carry three- or four-star grades for Army, Navy, and Air Force officers, but only three-star grades for Marine Corps officers. A Marine on the active list could only hold four stars while serving as commandant of the Marine Corps (or chief of staff to the president as commander in chief, but no Marine ever held that office), although retired Marines could be recalled to active duty in four-star grades. In 1971, the Marine Corps asked Congress for the same generic authority to appoint four-star officers that the Officer Personnel Act gave the other services, citing the hypothetical prospect of appointing a Marine as chairman of the Joint Chiefs of Staff or commander in chief of the unified Pacific or Atlantic command, or giving a fourth star to the deputy director of central intelligence, then-lieutenant general Robert E. Cushman Jr. The House voted to authorize two four-star positions of importance and responsibility for the Marine Corps, but the Senate declined to act, and the Marines did not receive this authority until 1980.

In 1969, Marine Corps assistant commandant Lewis W. Walt became the first Marine to hold a four-star appointment on the active list other than commandant. Walt had narrowly lost the race for commandant the previous year, when President Lyndon B. Johnson appointed Leonard F. Chapman Jr. despite what Chapman believed to be Johnson's personal preference for Walt. Once in office, Chapman engineered a fourth star for Walt by submitting his name to the Joint Chiefs of Staff for nomination as commander in chief of U.S. Southern Command, a command that had always belonged to the Army. Suspecting that Johnson would pick Walt for that four-star appointment over any competing Army general if given the opportunity, the Joint Chiefs of Staff instead accepted Chapman's fallback proposal to promote Walt in his current job. At the request of the Department of Defense, a House bill was submitted to increase the grade of assistant commandant to general so long as Walt personally held the office. The House Armed Services Committee amended the bill to authorize any assistant commandant to be appointed as a second Marine four-star general if the total active-duty strength of the Marine Corps exceeded 200,000, giving the Marines a similar proportion of four-star officers as the other services. Since Marine Corps strength exceeded 300,000 at the time, Walt received his fourth star when the bill became law in May 1969.

When the United States withdrew from Vietnam, Marine Corps strength dropped below the 200,000 needed for a new assistant commandant to receive a fourth star. The House voted to remove the strength requirement in 1971 but the Senate declined to act. A momentary fluctuation lifted strength above the threshold on the day Samuel Jaskilka became assistant commandant on July 1, 1975, but commandant Louis H. Wilson Jr. refused to recommend Jaskilka for a fourth star until Congress permanently authorized the grade of general for the assistant commandant regardless of Marine Corps strength. Congress removed the strength requirement on March 4, 1976, and Jaskilka was nominated for promotion two weeks later.

==== Coast Guard ====
During World War II, appointments to four-star grades were authorized for the commandants of the Marine Corps and Coast Guard until six months after the end of the war. The Officer Personnel Act permanently authorized four stars for the Marine Corps commandant in 1947, but the Coast Guard requested only three stars for its commandant when Congress consolidated the various Coast Guard statutes into Title 14 of the United States Code in 1949. Both Coast Guard commandants who were appointed as vice admirals were eventually promoted to admiral: Merlin O'Neill when he retired with a tombstone promotion in 1954, and Alfred C. Richmond when Congress restored the Coast Guard commandant to four stars in 1960.

==== Chief of staff to the commander in chief ====
The unique office held by Navy five-star admiral William D. Leahy during World War II was never filled again, but continued to be authorized four stars until 2016.

During World War II, retired chief of naval operations William D. Leahy was recalled to active duty to preside over the Joint Chiefs of Staff with the title of chief of staff to the commander in chief of the United States Army and Navy. The National Security Act of 1947 defined the committee as the three service chiefs for the Army, Navy, and Air Force, plus the chief of staff to the commander in chief "if there be one", a qualifier reflecting an understanding with Congress that Leahy could serve as long as the president wanted but no successor would be appointed. Leahy retired in March 1949, and five months later Congress dropped his vacant office from the Joint Chiefs of Staff and established a chairman of the Joint Chiefs of Staff instead.

Although no one ever held Leahy's office again, the Officer Personnel Act of 1947 authorized any successor to be a four-star officer in addition to those authorized for each service. Its revival was suggested at least twice before the never-used authorization was finally repealed in 2016:

- In July 1961, President John F. Kennedy recalled retired Army chief of staff Maxwell D. Taylor to active duty as a White House advisor, having lost confidence in the Joint Chiefs of Staff after the failed Bay of Pigs invasion. Taylor wanted Leahy's title of chief of staff to the commander in chief, but Kennedy said that office was superseded by the chairman of the Joint Chiefs of Staff, and insisted on a lesser title so as not to insert a "super chief" between himself and the Joint Chiefs of Staff. Instead, Taylor served as military representative to the president until being appointed chairman of the Joint Chiefs of Staff in October 1962.
- In May 1973, the escalating Watergate scandal forced the resignation of White House chief of staff H. R. Haldeman. Army vice chief of staff Alexander Haig was detailed as interim replacement, raising questions of legality since Regular Army officers on the active list could not accept civil appointments without vacating their military commissions. The Defense Department argued that Haig's duties were more like Leahy's than Haldeman's, and suggested the Senate confirm Haig as four-star chief of staff to the president as commander in chief, but it quickly became clear that Haig really would take over all of Haldeman's former duties, so Haig retired from the Army to become White House chief of staff on August 1.

==== Chairman of the Joint Chiefs of Staff ====
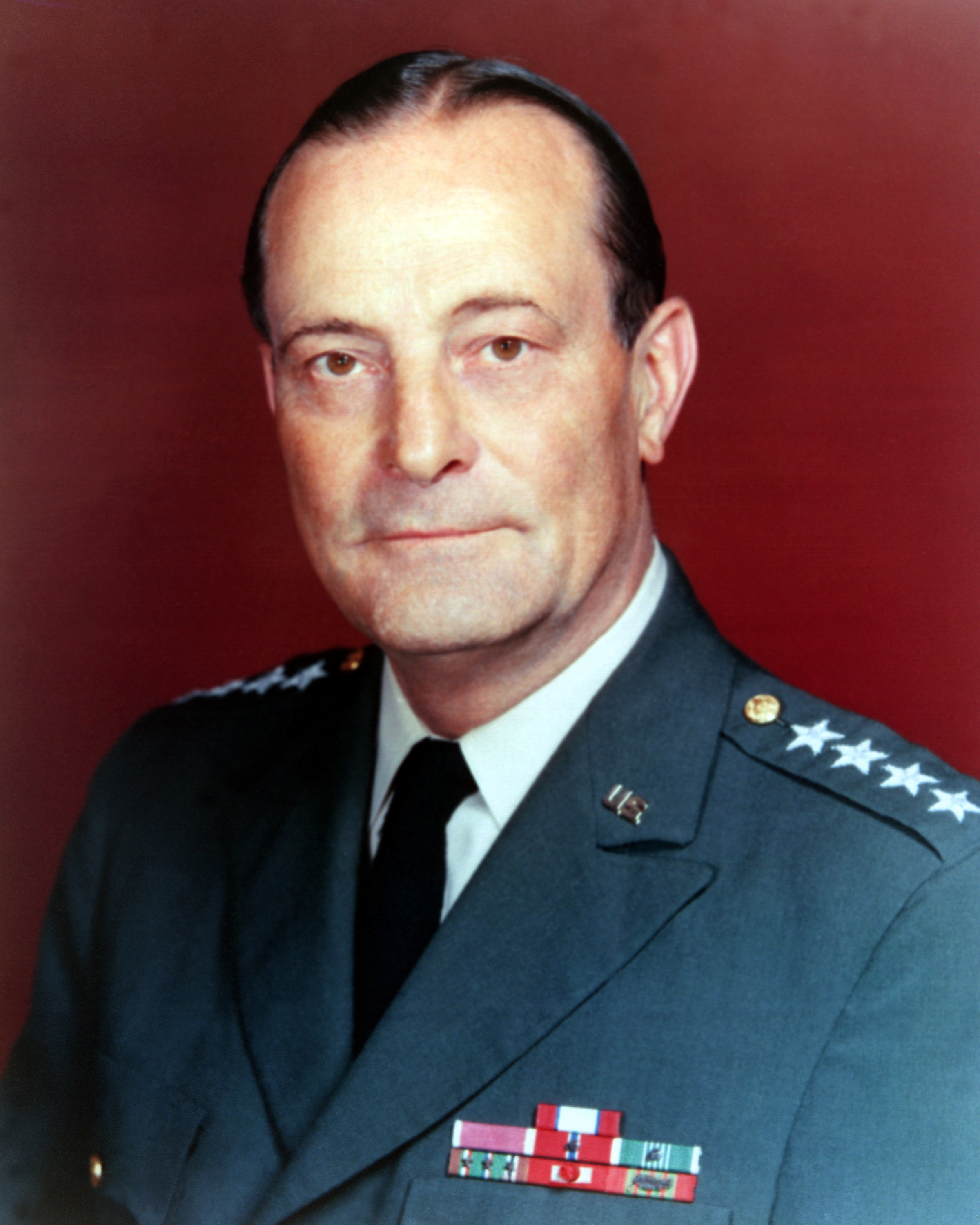
General Earle Wheeler served a record six years as chairman of the Joint Chiefs of Staff.

The National Security Act Amendments of 1949 upgraded the National Military Establishment into a full executive department, the Department of Defense. It also created a four-star chairman of the Joint Chiefs of Staff, who had precedence over all other officers of the armed services and was not charged against the four-star caps of any service.

The first chairman, Omar Bradley, assumed office in August 1949. In September 1950, House Armed Services Committee chairman Carl Vinson declared that Bradley's responsibilities as chairman during the Korean War merited a fifth star. Rather than increase the rank of the office of chairman, a step toward creating the single chief of staff of the armed forces that many in Congress opposed as risking military dictatorship, the Senate Armed Services Committee adopted the House's approach of a private law that promoted Bradley personally to the permanent grade of general of the Army for distinguished service "but not because of the position he holds as Chairman of the Joint Chiefs of Staff." Vinson eventually decided that Bradley's five-star promotion set a bad precedent, even as a personal honor, and declined to support similar legislation to promote Spruance in 1959.

During the Vietnam War, Earle Wheeler served a record six years as chairman of the Joint Chiefs of Staff. With no formal declaration of war to bypass the statutory term limits on that position, Congress twice passed laws to extend his tenure for another year.

==== Joint Chiefs of Staff ====
The Joint Chiefs of Staff originated in February 1942 as an ad hoc committee to coordinate with the heads of the British armed services after the United States entered World War II. For most of the war, it comprised the three four-star chiefs of the Army, Navy, and Army aviation, and was chaired by the chief of staff to the commander in chief, retired Navy admiral William D. Leahy. The committee operated without a charter or statutory authority until being formally established by the National Security Act of 1947, which defined its membership as the three service chiefs for the Army, Navy, and Air Force, plus the chief of staff to the commander in chief. When Leahy retired in 1949, Congress replaced him with a statutory chairman of the Joint Chiefs of Staff, who presided over meetings but did not have a vote in them until 1958.

In 1952, Congress granted the commandant of the Marine Corps co-equal status with members of the Joint Chiefs of Staff when discussing matters of direct concern to the Marine Corps. On one occasion, all four statutory members happened to be absent, but the Air Force vice chief of staff was designated acting chairman instead of Marine Corps commandant Louis H. Wilson Jr., who was technically only an advisor to the committee, not a member. Insulted, Wilson demanded full voting membership for the Marine Corps, and Congress made the commandant the fifth statutory member on October 20, 1978.

==== Service chief appointments ====
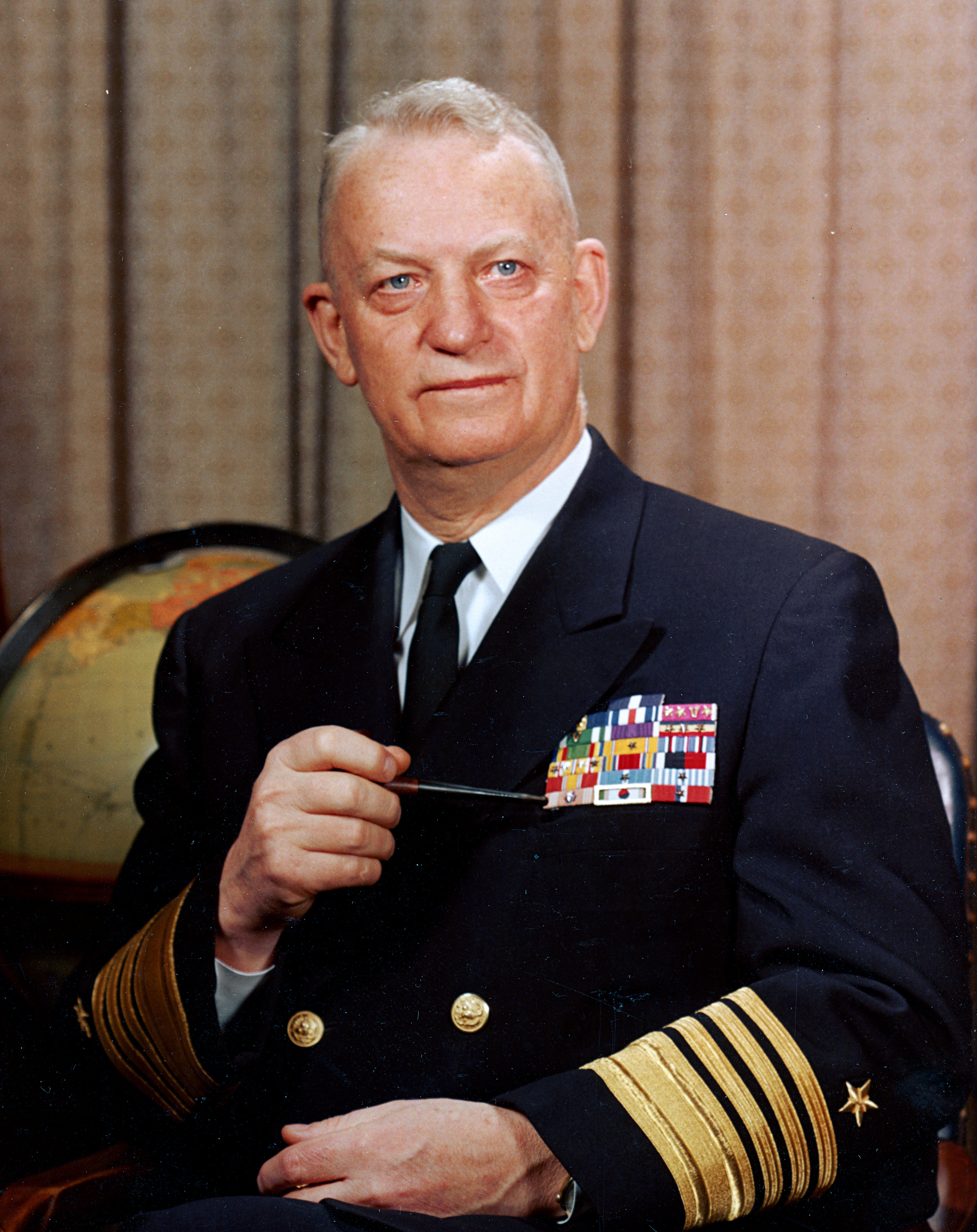
Arleigh Burke served a record six years as chief of naval operations in consecutive two-year terms.

Because each member of the Joint Chiefs of Staff held an office with its own unique legislative history, appointments to those offices were handled slightly differently until 1967, when the terms of all service chiefs were standardized at four years.

Under the laws that created them, the Navy, Air Force, and Marine Corps service chiefs were all appointed by the president with the consent of the Senate, but the Army chief of staff was detailed solely by the president. Nevertheless, beginning in 1939, four successive Army chiefs of staff (Marshall, Eisenhower, Bradley, Collins) were nominated by the president and confirmed by the Senate, apparently to mirror Navy and Air Force practice but without legal authority. The Army Organization Act of 1950 closed this loophole by requiring for the first time that the Army chief of staff be appointed with the advice and consent of the Senate.

Postwar reorganization laws provided terms of up to four years for the Army, Navy, and Air Force service chiefs. Members of the Joint Chiefs of Staff, including the chairman, were usually nominated for two-year terms, giving the president flexibility to gracefully drop an unwanted chief halfway through a four-year tour by not reappointing him for a second two-year term, in the cases of Army chief of staff George Decker and chiefs of naval operations Robert B. Carney and George W. Anderson Jr.; retain a favored chief for a third two-year term, in the case of chief of naval operations Arleigh Burke; or extend a chief for a few months beyond the end of his term, in the cases of Air Force chiefs of staff Hoyt Vandenberg and Curtis LeMay.

By 1956, even Marine Corps commandant Randolph M. Pate had his four-year tenure split into consecutive two-year terms, despite the four-year term specified by law for his office. The Senate Armed Services Committee rejected the next two-year nomination that was submitted in 1959 for Pate's successor, David M. Shoup, who was renominated and confirmed for the statutory four-year term.

Congress gave all four service chiefs the same fixed term of four years in 1967, effective January 1, 1969, with no reappointment unless Congress declared a new war or national emergency after that date. The term of the chairman was not increased to four years until 2016.

==== Civil and diplomatic appointments ====
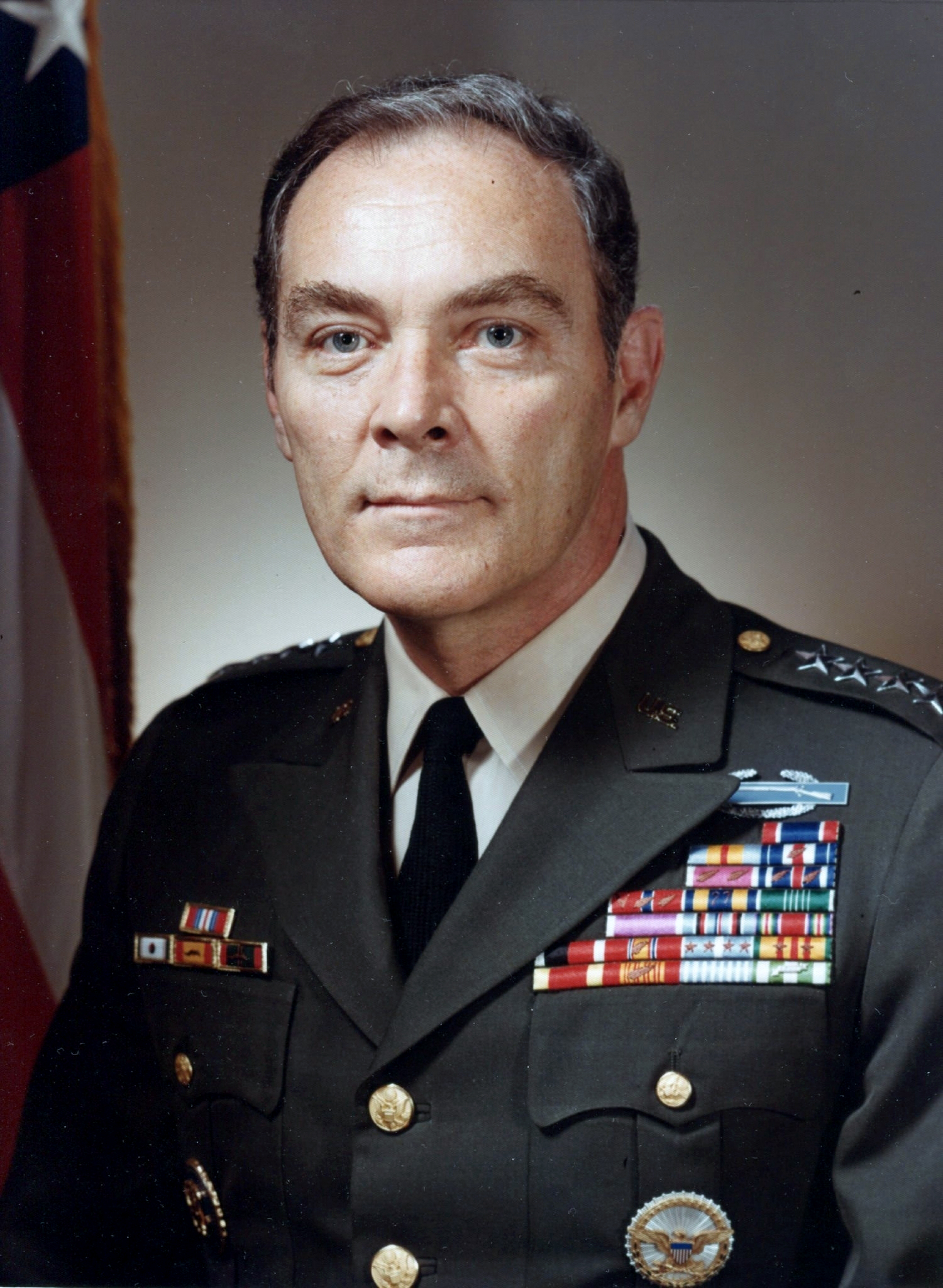
The Comptroller General of the United States tried to revoke the military pension of General Alexander Haig on the grounds that Haig vacated his commission by acting as civilian White House chief of staff while still on the active list.

After the Civil War, Congress mandated that Army and Navy officers resign their commissions in order to accept diplomatic or consular appointments, so that other officers could be promoted to replace them. Accepting a diplomatic appointment cost even retired Navy officers their commissions until 1929, and retired Army officers until 1939. In March 1946, Vice Admiral Alan G. Kirk retired with a tombstone promotion to admiral to become ambassador to Belgium and Luxembourg. Later that month, Congress passed special legislation so Lieutenant General Walter Bedell Smith could remain on the active list as ambassador to the Soviet Union, preserving a military career that eventually culminated in four stars.

Regular Army officers on the active list also vacated their commissions if they accepted or exercised the functions of a civil office, unless exempted by special legislation like the 1945 law that let General Omar Bradley serve as administrator of Veterans Affairs without compromising his military status. In May 1973, Army vice chief of staff Alexander Haig was detailed as interim White House chief of staff during the Watergate scandal. Litigation over the legality of this assignment forced Haig to retire from the Army to accept permanent appointment as White House chief of staff in August. However, the Comptroller General of the United States tentatively concluded that, as a Regular Army officer on the active list, Haig had vacated his commission on May 4, the day he began exercising the functions of the civilian White House chief of staff, and hence could not have retired as a commissioned officer on August 1. The Comptroller General threatened to claw back the active-duty pay Haig had received from May 4 through July 31, plus any retired pay he collected afterward, but backed down after the Department of the Army asserted that Haig did not substantially perform the functions of White House chief of staff until after he retired from the Army, and that the Senate had validated the continued existence of his commission by voting to confirm his retirement in the grade of general.

==== Waivers for civilian appointments ====
Certain offices were required by law to be filled by civilians, meaning even retired military officers had to resign their commissions to qualify for appointment. In 1965, Congress waived this requirement to let retired Air Force general William F. McKee accept appointment as administrator of the Federal Aviation Agency without surrendering his commission and military pension. Modeled after the bill that let Army five-star general George Marshall serve as secretary of defense, McKee's waiver specifically stated that it was not meant to be a precedent for future military appointments, but when retired Air Force colonel Alexander P. Butterfield resigned his commission to become FAA administrator in 1973 and the Senate refused to reinstate him on the retired list afterward, subsequent military nominees demanded a similar waiver as a condition of their appointment, including retired Navy admiral James B. Busey IV in 1989 and retired Air Force general Thomas C. Richards in 1992.

In 2009, the Office of Legal Counsel and Congressional Research Service issued legal opinions construing retired officers as being appointed from civilian life, eliminating the need for a congressional waiver.

==== Central Intelligence Agency ====
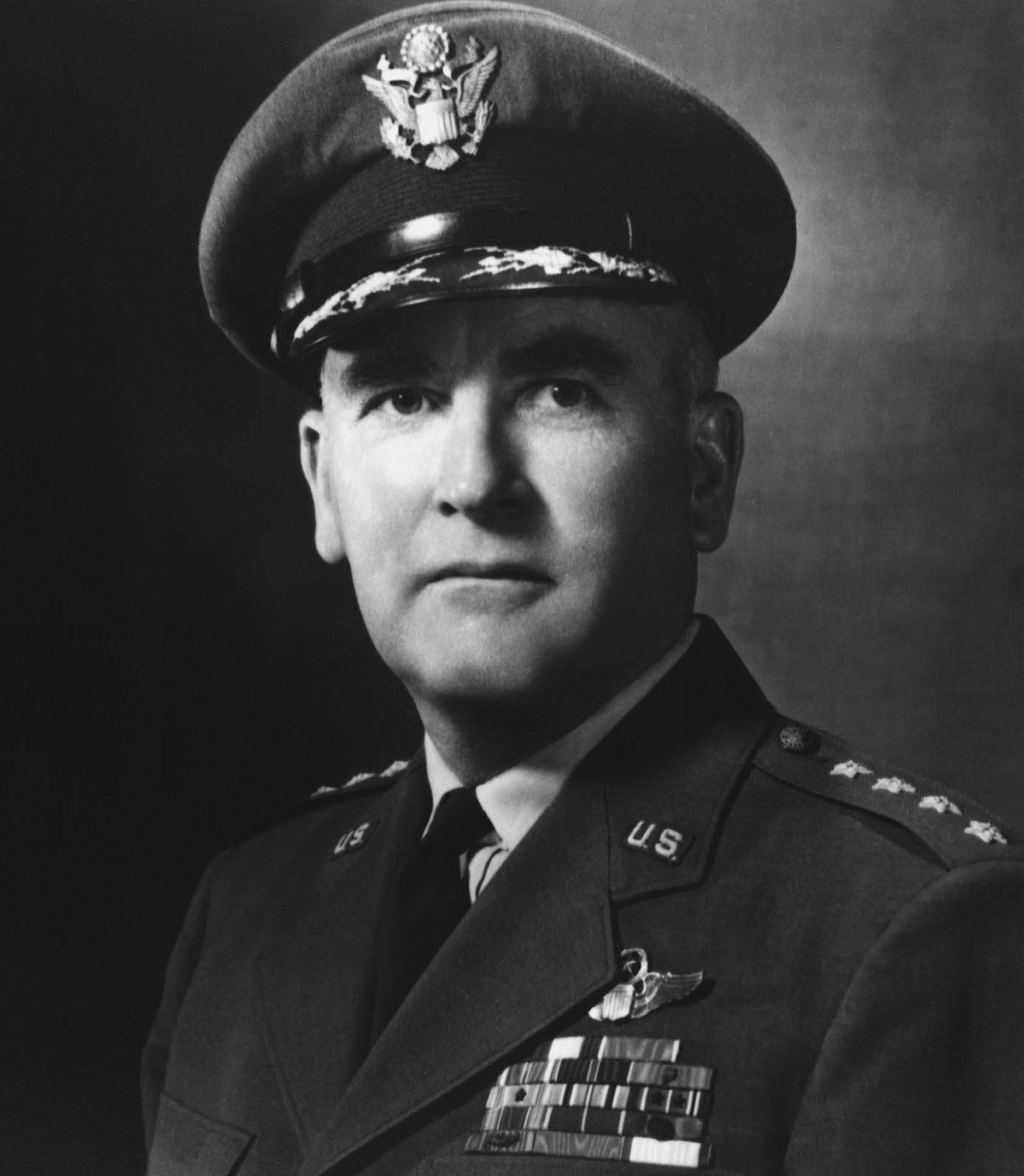
General Charles P. Cabell, first deputy director of central intelligence.

In 1951, Army lieutenant general Walter Bedell Smith received his fourth star while serving as director of central intelligence (DCI). After Smith retired, his successor tapped Air Force lieutenant general Charles P. Cabell to be deputy director of central intelligence (DDCI). The deputy director was appointed under the Executive Pay Act of 1949, making it a civil office, so to save Cabell and subsequent military appointees from having to resign their commissions to accept it, Congress authorized a commissioned officer of the armed services to serve as DCI or DDCI without counting against the three- and four-star caps, but barred the DCI and DDCI from both being military officers at the same time, either active or retired.

Military officers were appointed DDCI at three-star rank initially, although Cabell received a fourth star after five years in office and Vice Admiral John T. Hayward declined an offer to succeed Cabell as four-star DDCI in 1962. After Marine lieutenant general Robert E. Cushman Jr. became DDCI in 1969, the Marines lobbied Congress to let them hold four-star rank in positions other than commandant and assistant commandant, especially DDCI and chairman of the Joint Chiefs of Staff, but to no avail. The DCI gained a second three-star deputy in 1974, when the deputy to the director of central intelligence for the intelligence community (D/DCI/IC) was promoted to lieutenant general.

In 1976, Executive Order 11905, the first executive order on intelligence, emphasized the DCI's oversight of the broader intelligence community. The D/DCI/IC was elevated to four-star rank to give the community deputy primacy over the three-star agency heads, including the directors of the National Security Agency (NSA) and Defense Intelligence Agency (DIA) and the DDCI, who was delegated day-to-day management of the CIA. The first and only four-star D/DCI/IC, Navy admiral Daniel J. Murphy, retired after only a year when a rival Navy admiral, Stansfield Turner, became DCI in 1977; unlike the DDCI, the D/DCI/IC did not have to be a civilian when the DCI was a military officer, but Turner and others were uncomfortable with two of the top three intelligence officials being active-duty four-star admirals. NSA director and Navy vice admiral Bobby Ray Inman was a leading candidate to succeed Turner as DCI in 1981, but reluctantly accepted a fourth star to be DDCI instead, and subsequent military officers were also appointed DDCI at four-star rank.

When the director of national intelligence (DNI) replaced the DCI in 2005, the four-star exemption for a military officer serving as either DCI or DDCI was inherited by the DNI and his principal deputy, Air Force general Michael Hayden. Hayden was appointed director of the Central Intelligence Agency (DCIA) the next year, triggering Congress to create another exemption for that agency's director or deputy director.

== Legislation ==
Legislation	Citation	Summary	Service
Act of June 30, 1947 [Private Law 36]	61 Stat. 978	Authorized posthumous promotion of Roy S. Geiger to general.	USMC
Act of July 26, 1947 [National Security Act of 1947]	61 Stat. 500; 61 Stat. 503; 61 Stat. 505	Established secretary of defense, who must not have served on active duty as a commissioned officer in a regular component of the armed services within the last 10 years.; Established U.S. Air Force.; Established Air Force chief of staff with the same grade and allowances as the Army chief of staff, appointed by the president and confirmed by the Senate for a four-year term.; Transferred to U.S. Air Force all personnel in Army Air Forces, Air Corps, and General Headquarters Air Force.; Established Joint Chiefs of Staff comprising the service chiefs of the Army, Navy, and Air Force, and the chief of staff to the commander in chief, if one exists.	USAF
Act of August 7, 1947 [Officer Personnel Act of 1947]	61 Stat. 872; 61 Stat. 874; 61 Stat. 875; 61 Stat. 876; 61 Stat. 877; 61 Stat. 880; 61 Stat. 881; 61 Stat. 886; 61 Stat. 902; 61 Stat. 904; 61 Stat. 907	Authorized president to designate, subject to Senate confirmation: 1. Army officers in any permanent or temporary grade above brigadier general to have the rank of general while assigned to positions of importance and responsibility designated to carry that rank; and; 2. Navy officers on the active list above the grade of captain (or including that grade during war or national emergency) to have the grade of admiral while commanding fleets, subdivisions of fleets, or naval units afloat organized to perform a special or unusual mission, or while performing any duty of great importance and responsibility.; Authorized up to 15 officers in grades of general or admiral after July 1, 1948, except in time of war or national emergency: 1. 5 Army generals, including the chief of staff; 2. 4 Navy admirals, including the chief of naval operations; 3. 4 Air Force generals, including the chief of staff; 4. 1 Marine Corps general serving as commandant; and; 5. 1 additional officer serving as chief of staff to the president.; Capped: 1. Army and Air Force positions with ranks above major general at 15 percent of the total number of general officers serving on active federal military duty, of which not more than 25 percent to carry the rank of general; and; 2. Navy officers on the active list in grades above rear admiral at 15 percent of the total number of flag officers authorized in the line of the Regular Navy, of whom not more than 8 to serve in the grade of admiral.; Authorized an unlimited number of temporary appointments in the Army and Air Force above the grade of major general during a national emergency.; Required Senate confirmation for all four-star appointments.; Set mandatory retirement for Army and Air Force officers at; 1. 5 years in the permanent grade of major general, 35 years of active commissioned service, or age 60 (at the discretion of the Secretary of War), whichever is later; or; 2. age 62 if in the permanent grade of major general; 3. with up to 10 officers above the grade of major general authorized to remain on the active list until age 64.; Set mandatory retirement for Navy officers at; 1. 4 years in grade of rear admiral and 34 years of total commissioned service, whichever is greater, unless continued on the active list by the retention board for that fiscal year; or; 2. age 62; 3. with up to 10 officers authorized to remain on the active list until age 64 (60 Stat. 28); 4. with up to 10 retired or Reserve flag officers authorized on active duty at any time, excluding temporary service on boards, except in time of war or national emergency.; Set mandatory retirement for Marine Corps officers at; 1. age 62.; Authorized president to place on the retired list, subject to Senate confirmation, with the highest rank held while on the active list but no increase in retired pay: 1. officers who served in positions designated to carry the rank of general or admiral (1947); 2. retired Army officers who served in the grade of general between December 7, 1941, and June 30, 1946 (Brehon B. Somervell); and; 3. retired Navy officers who served in the designated rank of admiral (1917) (Husband E. Kimmel eligible but not advanced).; Authorized all Navy and Marine Corps officers to retire with the rank but not the pay of the next higher grade if specially commended for performance of duty in actual combat on or before December 31, 1946.; Changed Navy staff corps grades to be the same as in line (Ben Moreell).	USA, USN, USAF, USMC
Act of March 5, 1948	62 Stat. 67	Changed term of chief of naval operations from four years to not more than four years.; Required Senate confirmation for vice chief of naval operations.	USN
Act of June 26, 1948	62 Stat. 1052	Authorized permanent grade of general or admiral and full active-duty pay and allowances in retirement for officers serving in the temporary grade of: 1. general since March 29, 1945, who successfully commanded an army group composed of as many as four armies in the field against the enemy from August 1, 1944, to August 15, 1945 (Omar N. Bradley); 2. general since March 29, 1945, who commanded the U.S. Army Strategic Air Force, European Theater of Operations, from January 1, 1944, to March 1, 1946 (Carl A. Spaatz); or; 3. admiral since February 4, 1944, who commanded a major combatant unit in the Pacific Theater of Operations during World War II (Raymond A. Spruance).	USA, USN, USAF
Act of June 28, 1948	62 Stat. 1069	Exempted from caps officers in the grade of general of the Army not serving as chief of staff or in command of any territorial or tactical subdivision of the Army or Air Force.; Exempted from caps after July 1, 1948, and until July 1, 1950, Army and Navy officers with dates of rank as: 1. general between March 8, 1945, and April 15, 1945, inclusive (Mark W. Clark, Thomas T. Handy, Courtney H. Hodges); or; 2. admiral prior to April 4, 1945 (Thomas C. Kinkaid, Henry K. Hewitt).	USA, USN, USAF
Act of June 29, 1948 [Army and Air Force Vitalization and Retirement Equalization Act of 1948]	62 Stat. 1085	Advanced Army and Air Force officers on the retired list to highest temporary grade in which they served satisfactorily for at least six months on active duty between September 9, 1940, and June 30, 1946.	USA, USAF
Act of August 4, 1949	63 Stat. 498; 63 Stat. 516; 63 Stat. 558	Reduced rank of commandant of the Coast Guard to vice admiral.; Authorized Coast Guard officers to retire with the rank but not the pay of the next higher grade if specially commended for performance of duty in actual combat on or before December 31, 1946 (Merlin O'Neill).; Specified no reduction or abolition of the grade any person held on the effective date of this Act (Joseph F. Farley).	USCG
Act of August 10, 1949 [National Security Act Amendments of 1949]	63 Stat. 581	Established chairman of the Joint Chiefs of Staff with grade of general or admiral, who outranks all other officers, with the same pay and allowances as the Army chief of staff.; Specified that chairman of the Joint Chiefs of Staff is appointed by the president with Senate consent for a two-year term, and eligible for one reappointment with Senate consent, or unlimited reappointments in time of war.; Exempted from caps the chairman of the Joint Chiefs of Staff.; Added to Joint Chiefs of Staff the chairman of the Chiefs of Staff, as presiding officer but having no vote, and removed chief of staff to the commander in chief.	USA, USN, USAF
Act of September 3, 1949 [Private Law 81-250]	63 Stat. 1171	Authorized posthumous promotion of John S. McCain Sr. to admiral.	USN
Act of October 12, 1949 [Career Compensation Act of 1949]	63 Stat. 807; 63 Stat. 816	Established pay grade O-8 for general and admiral, lieutenant general and vice admiral, and major general and rear admiral (upper half).; Provided personal money allowances for three- and four-star officers, with higher allowances for the Army, Navy, Air Force, Marine Corps, and Coast Guard service chiefs.	USA, USN, USAF, USMC, USCG
Act of June 23, 1950	64 Stat. 250; 64 Stat. 252	Set mandatory retirement for Navy officers at; 1. 5 years in grade as rear admiral or 35 years of total commissioned service, whichever is later; 2. unless continued on the active list by the retention board for that fiscal year.; Set mandatory retirement for Marine Corps officers at; 1. June 30 of the fiscal year in which they complete 5 years in grade of major general, or 35 years of total commissioned service, whichever is later; 2. unless annually continued on the active list by the retention board for each fiscal year, or; 3. unless serving as commandant of the Marine Corps.	USN, USMC
Act of June 28, 1950 [Army Organization Act of 1950]	64 Stat. 266	Required Senate confirmation for Army chief of staff, for a term of not more than four years.	USA
Act of September 18, 1950 [Private Law 81-957]	64 Stat. A224	Authorized promotion of Omar N. Bradley to permanent grade of general of the Army, including full active-duty pay and allowances in retirement, for distinguished services rendered to his country and not because he was serving as chairman of the Joint Chiefs of Staff.	USA
Joint Resolution of January 2, 1951 [Private Law 81-1083]	64 Stat. A271	Authorized posthumous promotion of Walton H. Walker to general.	USA
Act of September 19, 1951 [Air Force Organization Act of 1951]	65 Stat. 328; 65 Stat. 332	Specified rank of general for Air Force chief of staff.; Changed term of Air Force chief of staff from four years to not more than four years.; Established legislative authority for Air Force vice chief of staff, Air Defense Command, Strategic Air Command, and Tactical Air Command, without specifying their rank.	USAF
Act of October 18, 1951 [Department of Defense Appropriation Act, 1952]	65 Stat. 424	Denied retired pay for commissioned members of the Regular Army, Navy, Marine Corps, or Air Force who voluntarily retired after October 18, 1951, except for disability, age, hardship, or the best interests of the service [Van Zandt amendment, renewed in 1953 (67 Stat. 337) and repealed in 1954 (68 Stat. 70)].	USA, USN, USAF, USMC
Act of June 28, 1952	66 Stat. 283	Granted commandant of the Marine Corps co-equal status with members of the Joint Chiefs of Staff when considering matters concerning the Marine Corps.	USMC
Act of July 10, 1952 [Department of Defense Appropriation Act, 1953]	66 Stat. 537	Denied pay for the last quarter of Fiscal Year 1953 for officers in grades of general and admiral exceeding fixed percentages of total average personnel in each service: 0.00055 for Army, 0.0007 for Navy and Air Force, and 0.0004 for Marine Corps [Davis amendment, modified and renewed in 1953 (67 Stat. 6, 67 Stat. 355), and repealed in 1954 (68 Stat. 70)].	USA, USN, USAF, USMC
Act of March 14, 1953	67 Stat. 6	Capped officers in grades of general and admiral on June 30, 1953, at 8 Army generals, 6 Navy admirals, 7 Air Force generals, and 1 Marine Corps general, with no exemptions.	USA, USN, USAF, USMC
Act of April 4, 1953	67 Stat. 20	Exempted from caps the; 1. director of central intelligence (Stansfield Turner), and; 2. deputy director of central intelligence (Charles P. Cabell, Bobby R. Inman, William O. Studeman, John A. Gordon).; Specified that the director and deputy director of central intelligence could not both be commissioned officers of the armed services, whether active or retired.	USN, USAF
Act of July 17, 1953 [Private Law 92]	67 Stat. A34	Authorized retired pay for Graves B. Erskine after his voluntary retirement.	USMC
Act of August 1, 1953 [Department of Defense Appropriation Act, 1954]	67 Stat. 355	Denied pay for the last quarter of Fiscal Year 1954 for officers in grades of general and admiral exceeding 9 Army generals, 7 Navy admirals, 9 Air Force generals, and 1 Marine Corps general, with no exemptions.	USA, USN, USAF, USMC
Act of May 5, 1954 [Officer Grade Limitation Act of 1954]	68 Stat. 65; 68 Stat. 70	Capped number of general and flag officers as a sliding-scale function of total commissioned officer strength.; Repealed Davis and Van Zandt amendments.	USA, USN, USAF, USMC
Act of July 19, 1954	68 Stat. 492	Authorized promotion to general on the retired list, without higher pay, or posthumously of any officer who, while a lieutenant general, was: 1. commanding general of Army Ground Forces between March 8, 1942, and August 16, 1945 (Lesley J. McNair, Ben Lear); 2. in command of a field army in the European-African-Middle Eastern Theater of Operations between December 11, 1941, and May 8, 1945 (Lucian K. Truscott Jr., Leonard T. Gerow, William H. Simpson, Alexander M. Patch); 3. in command of a field army in the Asiatic-Pacific Theater of Operations between December 8, 1941, and August 16, 1945 (Robert L. Eichelberger, Simon B. Buckner Jr.); 4. in command of Army forces including one or more field armies and supporting units in either theater between March 8, 1942, and August 16, 1945 (Robert C. Richardson Jr.); 5. commanding general of United States forces in China and chief of staff to Generalissimo Chiang Kai-shek in the China Theater of Operations between March 8, 1942, and August 16, 1945 (Albert C. Wedemeyer); or; 6. in command of Western Defense Command between December 5, 1939, and June 14, 1943 (John L. DeWitt).	USA
Act of March 31, 1955 [Career Incentive Act of 1955]	69 Stat. 19	Incremented monthly basic pay of active-duty three- and four-star officers by $100 and $200, without establishing pay grades above O-8.	USA, USN, USAF, USMC
Act of August 10, 1956	70A Stat. 162; 70A Stat. 167; 70A Stat. 230; 70A Stat. 281; 70A Stat. 282; 70A Stat. 292; 70A Stat. 294; 70A Stat. 295; 70A Stat. 394; 70A Stat. 492; 70A Stat. 494; 70A Stat. 554; 70A Stat. 642	Codified previous Army, Navy, Air Force, and Marine Corps laws as Title 10 of United States Code, including laws governing: 1. appointments to four-star grades (10 U.S.C. 3066, 5231, 8066), and; 2. retirements in four-star grades (10 U.S.C. 3962, 6325, 8962).; Authorized suspension of Navy four-star caps during war or national emergency, until June 30 of the fiscal year following the end of the emergency (10 U.S.C. 5234) [suspended for the duration of the Korean War emergency by Executive Order 10886 (September 6, 1960)].; Specified terms of; 1. not more than four years for Army and Air Force chiefs of staff, unless reappointed; 2. not more than four years for chief of naval operations; and; 3. four years for commandant of the Marine Corps.; Authorized retirement in four-star grades for; 1. Army and Air Force officers, at the discretion of the president and with the consent of the Senate; 2. Navy and Marine Corps officers who served two and a half years as chief of naval operations or commandant of the Marine Corps, or were serving in those offices when retired, at the discretion of the president; Repealed authorization for brevet ranks (R.S. 1209, 10 U.S.C. 521).	USA, USN, USAF, USMC
Act of May 20, 1958 [Uniformed Services Pay Act of 1958]	72 Stat. 122; 72 Stat. 124; 72 Stat. 128; 72 Stat. 129; 72 Stat. 130	Established pay grades O-10 for four-star officers and O-9 for three-star officers.; Set higher pay within the O-10 grade for officers serving as chairman of the Joint Chiefs of Staff, Army or Air Force chief of staff, chief of naval operations, or Marine Corps commandant.; Suspended recomputation of retired pay based on active-duty pay raises (Lyman L. Lemnitzer).; Authorized retired officers who held the active-duty rank of general or admiral for at least 180 days to recompute their retired pay based on the $200 monthly pay increment from 1955 (69 Stat. 19).; Authorized retired officers recalled to active duty in a higher tombstone grade to recompute their retired pay using the higher grade after serving continuously in that grade for at least two years (Gerald C. Thomas).; Froze pay of five-star officers and four-star officers permanently authorized full active-duty pay and allowances (Raymond A. Spruance, Carl A. Spaatz, Alexander A. Vandegrift) [increased by 3.2 percent in 1966 (80 Stat. 278) and 4.5 percent in 1967 (81 Stat. 654), and given the same increases as other retired officers starting in 1973 (87 Stat. 908)].	USA, USN, USAF, USMC, USCG
Act of August 6, 1958 [Department of Defense Reorganization Act of 1958]	72 Stat. 519	Elevated chairman to voting member of Joint Chiefs of Staff.	USA, USN, USAF
Act of August 11, 1959	73 Stat. 337	Repealed authorization for Navy, Marine Corps, and Coast Guard officers to retire with the rank but not the pay of the next higher grade if specially commended for performance of duty in actual combat, effective November 1, 1959.	USN, USMC, USCG
Act of May 14, 1960	74 Stat. 144	Increased rank of commandant of the Coast Guard to admiral, effective June 1, 1960.	USCG
Act of October 2, 1963 [Uniformed Services Pay Act of 1963]	77 Stat. 213	Tied retired pay increases to consumer price index (CPI) instead of to active-duty pay raises.	USA, USN, USAF, USMC, USCG
Act of August 19, 1964 [Dual Compensation Act]	78 Stat. 484	Authorized retired regular officers to receive the full salary of a civilian office, but with reduced military retired pay.; Authorized exemptions from retired pay reduction, including up to 30 positions in NASA (Walter F. Boone, Jacob E. Smart).	USA, USN, USAF, USMC, USCG
Act of June 22, 1965	79 Stat. 171	Authorized William F. McKee to be appointed Administrator of the Federal Aviation Agency as a retired Air Force officer instead of as a civilian.	USAF
Act of June 5, 1967	81 Stat. 53	Specified four-year terms for Army, Navy, and Air Force service chiefs, the same tenure as the Marine Corps commandant, effective January 1, 1969.; Limited all service chief reappointments to terms of not more than four years in time of war or national emergency declared after December 31, 1968, but such reappointments did not need Senate consent.	USA, USN, USAF, USMC
Act of December 16, 1967 [Federal Salary Act of 1967]	81 Stat. 638	Capped civil service pay at Level V of the Executive Schedule [extended to military pay by Federal Pay Comparability Act of 1970 (84 Stat. 1951)].	USA, USN, USAF, USMC, USCG
Act of December 16, 1967	81 Stat. 652; 81 Stat. 654	Tied active-duty pay increases to civil service pay.; Created retired pay inversion when consumer price index (CPI) increased faster than active-duty pay.	USA, USN, USAF, USMC, USCG
Act of June 15, 1968	82 Stat. 180	Authorized officer serving as chairman of the Joint Chiefs of Staff on April 1, 1968, to be reappointed to an additional one-year term (Earle G. Wheeler) [second one-year extension authorized in 1969 (83 Stat. 12)].	USA
Act of May 2, 1969	83 Stat. 8	Authorized grade of general for assistant commandant of the Marine Corps if total active duty strength of Marine Corps exceeds 200,000 at time of appointment.	USMC
Act of May 21, 1971 [Private Law 92-1]	85 Stat. 833	Authorized Keith B. McCutcheon to retire with the rank but not the pay of a general.	USMC
Act of November 16, 1973 [Department of Defense Appropriation Authorization Act, 1974]	87 Stat. 621	Authorized promotion of Hyman G. Rickover to admiral on the retired list.	USN
Act of October 8, 1974 [Department of Defense Appropriation Act, 1975]	88 Stat. 1232	Denied pay for the last quarter of Fiscal Year 1975 for officers in grades of general or admiral exceeding 36 on active duty in the Department of Defense.	USA, USN, USAF, USMC, USCG
Act of October 7, 1975 [Department of Defense Appropriation Authorization Act, 1976]	89 Stat. 538	Solved retired pay inversion by granting retiring officers the highest retired pay they could have received by retiring earlier [Tower amendment].	USA, USN, USAF, USMC, USCG
Act of March 4, 1976	90 Stat. 202	Authorized grade of general for assistant commandant of the Marine Corps.; Required any disability retirement of a general or flag officer to be approved by the secretary of defense.	USA, USN, USAF, USMC
Act of September 14, 1976 [National Emergencies Act]	90 Stat. 1255	Terminated all existing national emergencies, effective September 14, 1978.	USA, USN, USAF, USMC
Act of October 11, 1976	90 Stat. 2078	Authorized posthumous promotion of George Washington to General of the Armies.	USA
Act of July 30, 1977 [Department of Defense Appropriation Authorization Act, 1978]	91 Stat. 335; 91 Stat. 336	Reduced number of general and flag officers in Army, Navy, Air Force, and Marine Corps from 1,141 to 1,073 after October 1, 1980, except in time of war or national emergency.; Capped Navy officers in grades above rear admiral at 15 percent of the number of officers on the active list above the grade of captain, of whom not more than 25 percent to serve in the grade of admiral.; Capped Marine Corps officers in grades of general and lieutenant general at 15 percent of the number of officers on the active list above the grade of colonel.	USA, USN, USAF, USMC
Act of October 13, 1978 [Civil Service Reform Act of 1978]	92 Stat. 1150	Capped combined civil service salary and military retired pay at Level V of the Executive Schedule, effective January 11, 1979 (Stansfield Turner).	USA, USN, USAF, USMC, USCG
Act of October 20, 1978 [Department of Defense Appropriation Authorization Act, 1979]	92 Stat. 1622; 92 Stat. 1626	Elevated commandant of the Marine Corps to voting member of the Joint Chiefs of Staff.; Extended Navy and Marine Corps three- and four-star grade caps to cover any officer on active duty (Hyman G. Rickover).	USN, USMC

== See also ==
- Legislative history of United States four-star officers
- Legislative history of United States four-star officers until 1865
- Legislative history of United States four-star officers, 1866–1898
- Legislative history of United States four-star officers, 1899–1946
- Legislative history of United States four-star officers, 1980–2016
- Legislative history of United States four-star officers from 2017
