= Legislative history of United States four-star officers, 1980–2016 =

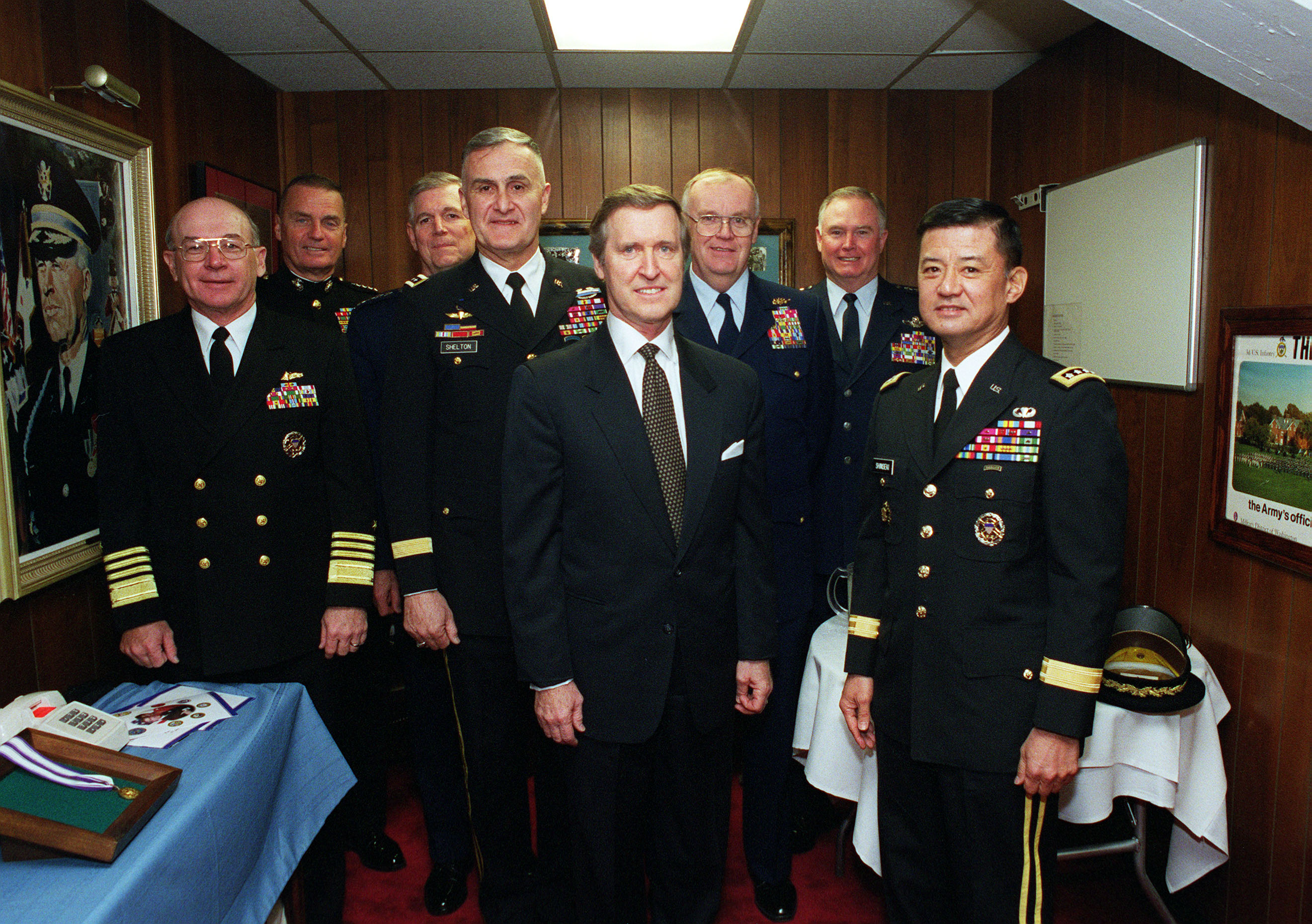
Defense secretary William Cohen with the Joint Chiefs of Staff and Coast Guard commandant in January 2001. Left to right: Clark, Jones, Myers, Shelton, Cohen, Loy, Ryan, and Shinseki.

From 1981, four-star appointments in the United States were governed by the Defense Officer Personnel Management Act (DOPMA), which established the first unified framework for officer promotions in every armed service.

Under DOPMA, the president could designate positions of importance and responsibility to carry four-star rank, to be filled by general and flag officers on active duty in any service. Generals and admirals held four-star rank only while serving in designated positions, while transitioning between four-star assignments, for up to 6 months while hospitalized, or for up to 90 days (reduced to 60 days in 1991) pending retirement. All four-star appointments and reassignments had to be confirmed by the Senate. Retirement in four-star grades also needed Senate consent until Congress delegated this authority to the secretary of defense in 1996.

== History ==
=== Appointment ===
==== Defense Officer Personnel Management Act ====
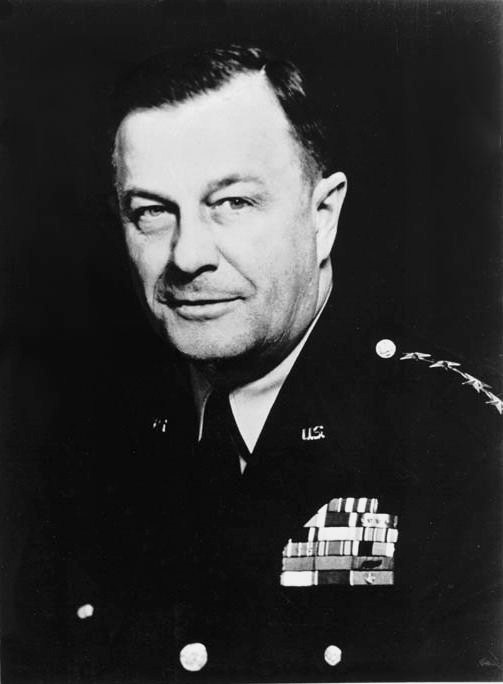
In 1960, retired Army general Charles L. Bolte chaired the committee whose controversial proposal to unify the officer promotion system directly inspired the Defense Officer Personnel Management Act of 1980.

The Defense Officer Personnel Management Act (DOPMA) of 1980 created the first unified framework for officer promotions across the armed services, culminating twenty years of reform efforts. Before World War II, the Army and Navy had completely independent officer promotion systems, which the Officer Personnel Act of 1947 updated but did not try to unify. The number of officers in each grade was capped by the Officer Grade Limitation Act (OGLA) of 1954. By 1959 the OGLA field grade ceilings were too low for the Air Force, forcing Congress to enact a series of short-term grade relief bills over the next two decades while working on a permanent solution.

In 1960, the Defense Ad Hoc Committee to Study and Revise the Officer Personnel Act of 1947 chaired by retired Army general Charles L. Bolte, or Bolte Committee, recommended comprehensive unification reforms that prefigured the eventual DOPMA legislation, including permanent grade relief for the Air Force. The Defense Department packaged the Bolte Committee report as a formal legislative proposal called the Bolte bill in 1963, which won strong support from the Air Force but not the Army or Congress, which declined to act. A stripped-back version called Baby Bolte was submitted in 1965 but withdrawn the next year as still too ambitious to pass Congress.

When the Air Force asked to renew its short-term grade relief yet again in 1972, Congress directed the Defense Department to produce a report on permanent grade relief, which was submitted to Congress as the first DOPMA proposal in 1974 and again in 1975. The House passed this version of DOPMA in 1976 and 1978, but the Senate refused to act, in part because the Defense Department deliberately excluded general and flag officers from the legislation on the grounds that complex reforms proposed for those grades had helped sink the Bolte bill.

The Senate passed its own version of DOPMA in 1979, which included general and flag officer grade caps that scaled flexibly with total force size, similar to field grades, and the first proposal for a joint-duty pool of general and flag officer spaces administered by the secretary of defense instead of the services. The services categorically rejected the Senate bill as unworkable, so the House and Senate Armed Services Committee staffs crafted a compromise that deleted the Senate's proposed general and flag officer grade tables and joint-duty pool, but kept its requirement that three- and four-star reassignments be confirmed by the Senate. The compromise DOPMA bill was signed into law on December 12, 1980, effective September 15, 1981.

==== Four-star appointments ====
DOPMA standardized four-star appointments across all services, replacing the previous service-specific mechanisms.

Under the Officer Personnel Act, four-star officers held that grade ex officio while serving in a position of importance and responsibility designated to carry that grade, and upon vacating that position reverted to two-star major general or rear admiral, the highest permanent grade to which they could be promoted personally on the active list. Only the first four-star appointment needed to be confirmed by the Senate, not subsequent reassignments. During a war or national emergency, Army and Air Force generals could also be promoted to temporary personal four-star grades that followed them to any assignment. The number of four-star officers was capped at a fraction of the total number of general or flag officers in every service except the Marine Corps, in which four-star grades were only authorized for the specific offices of commandant or assistant commandant (or chief of staff to the president as commander in chief, an obsolete office), effectively disqualifying Marines from serving as chairman of the Joint Chiefs of Staff or commander in chief of a unified command.

DOPMA streamlined the four-star appointment mechanism and applied it to all services. The president could designate positions of importance and responsibility to carry four-star grades ex officio, which could be filled by general and flag officers on active duty in any service. All four-star promotions and retirements had to be confirmed by the Senate. Generals and admirals held four-star rank only while serving in designated positions, while transitioning between four-star assignments, for up to 6 months while hospitalized, or for up to 90 days (reduced to 60 days in 1991) pending retirement. Four-star grades expired the day before the next four-star appointment took effect, forcing each reassignment to be confirmed separately by the Senate.

==== Percentage caps ====
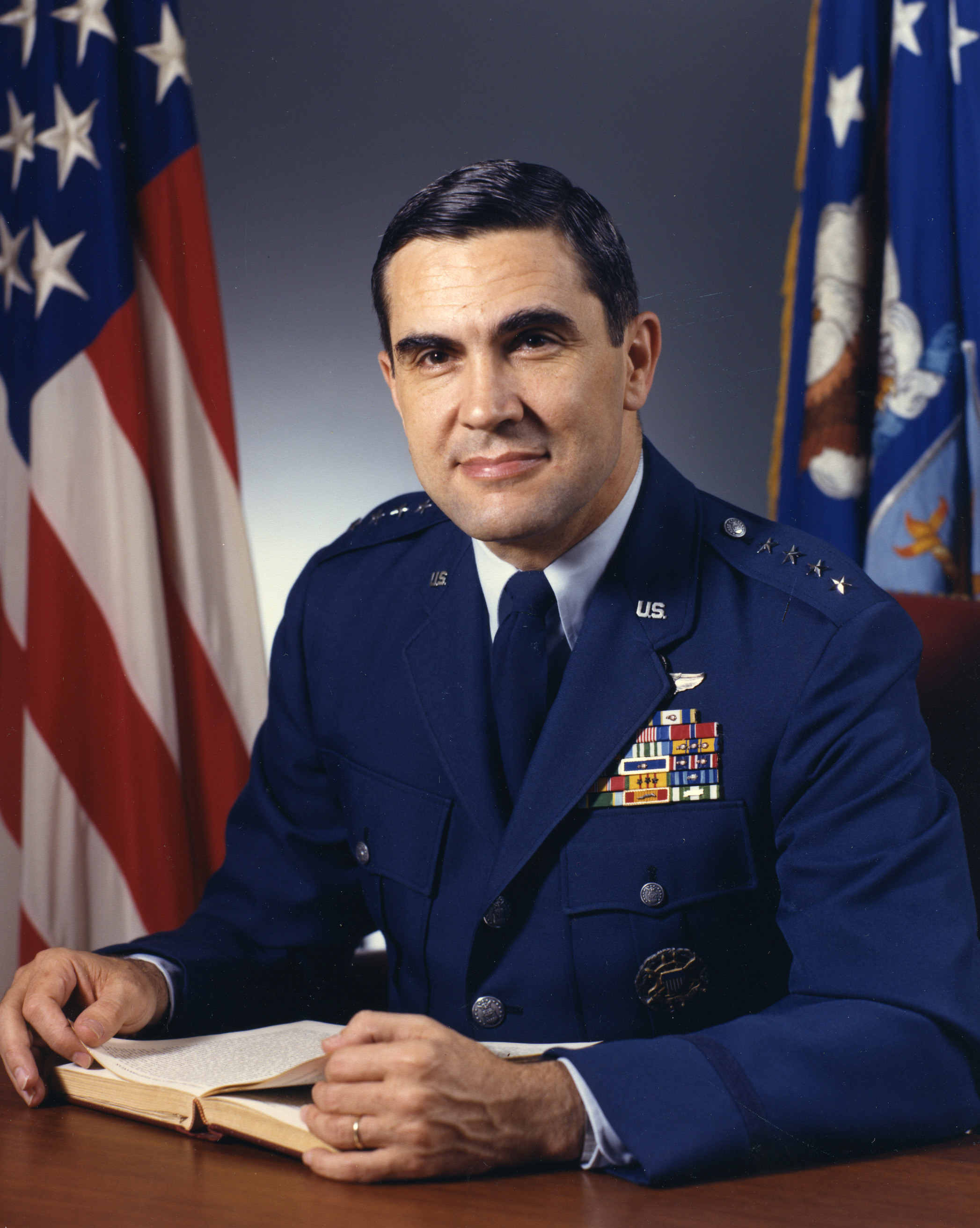
NORAD was downgraded to three stars while Air Force general Richard L. Lawson served as U.S. military representative to the NATO Military Committee.

DOPMA capped the number of four-star officers in the Army, Navy, and Air Force using the same formula as the Officer Personnel Act: 3.75 percent of all general or flag officers on active duty in each service (25 percent of the 15 percent who could be above two-star rank).

The grade cap formula cost the Air Force a four-star general when Congress cut the total number of general and flag officers in all services by 6 percent in 1978. The Air Force downgraded North American Aerospace Defense Command (NORAD) to three stars while an Air Force general served as four-star U.S. military representative to the NATO Military Committee (USMILREP), a joint position that rotated among the services and counted against the four-star grade cap of the service filling it. This highlighted two deficiencies: four-star officers in joint positions were being charged to their services instead of to a joint four-star grade pool, and four-star commands were being downgraded by an arbitrary formula instead of by validated job requirements.

The Defense Department repeatedly tried to reverse the 1978 reduction in general and flag officers, proposing a Flag and General Officer Management Act (FLAGOMA) that would replace the arbitrary numerical caps on general and flag officers with a framework for validating that specific jobs needed to carry those ranks. The services had presented similar validation frameworks to justify their need for more general and flag officers since 1968, none of which Congress found convincing. Despite annual resubmissions by the Defense Department, Congress never voted on FLAGOMA, being unimpressed by a methodology whose 1988 incarnation asked to increase general and flag officers from 1,075 to 1,436, even more than the 1,352 at the height of the Vietnam War in 1968.

==== Grade cap exemptions ====
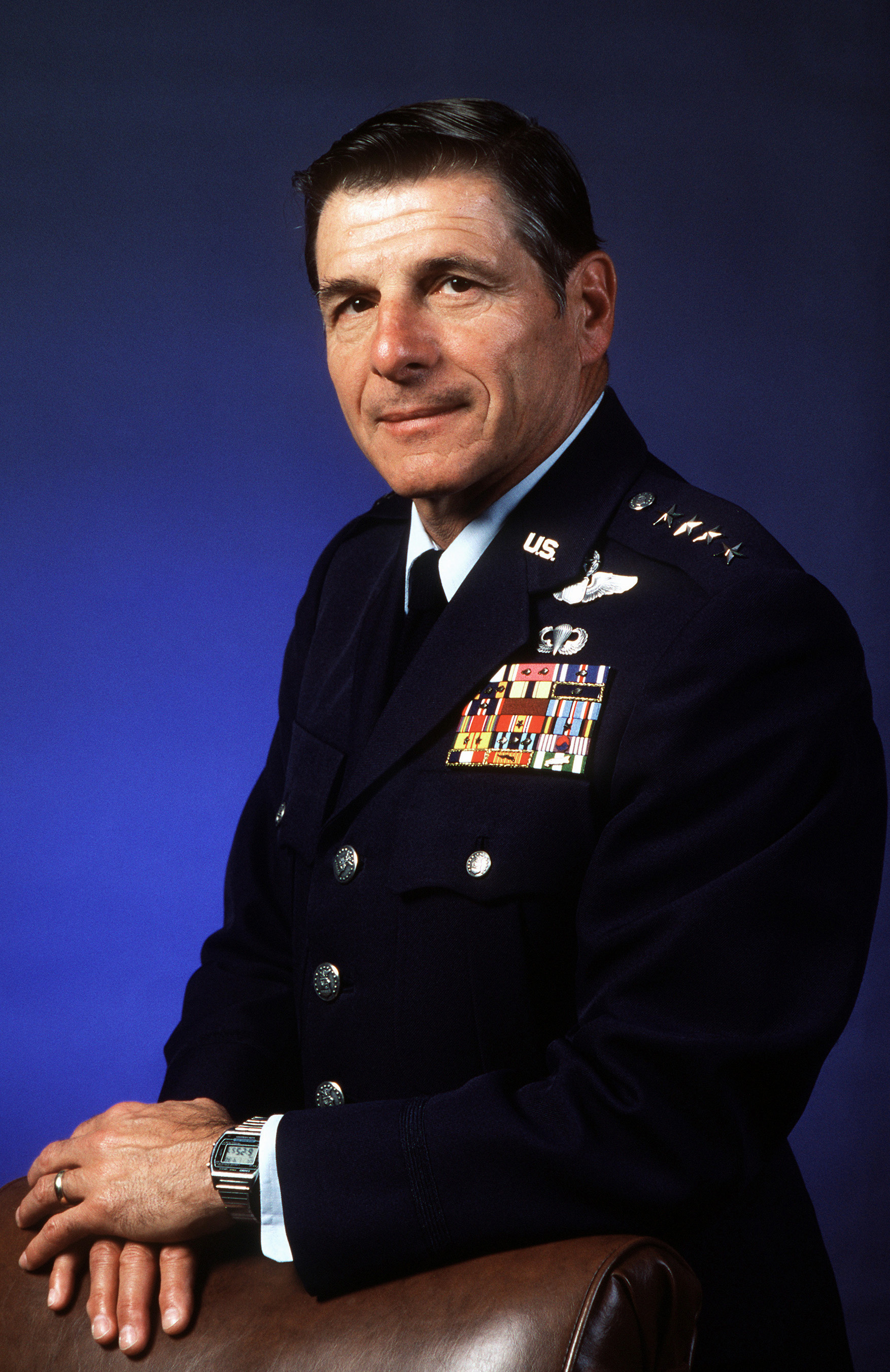
Air Force general Andrew P. Iosue received a fourth star when Texas senator John Tower prevented Air Training Command from being downgraded to three stars.

In April 1983, the Air Force tried to transfer one of its 12 four-star billets from Air Training Command (ATC) to Pacific Air Forces (PACAF) by replacing the retiring four-star ATC commander with three-star general Andrew P. Iosue and the retiring three-star PACAF commander with four-star general Jerome F. O'Malley. However, the powerful chairman of the Senate Armed Services Committee, Texas senator John Tower, blocked the Air Force from downgrading the only four-star command in his state. Instead, Iosue was promoted to four-star general to command ATC and the PACAF change of command was delayed while the Air Force lobbied Congress for an extra four-star general. The Pentagon asked Congress to authorize 27 more general and flag officers, which, if divided evenly between the Army, Air Force, and Navy (including Marine Corps), would have increased the Air Force's total from 338 to 347, just enough for 13 four-star generals under the grade cap formula. Instead, the annual defense authorization bill created an ad hoc grade cap exemption that let the Air Force have one more officer serving in a four-star grade during Fiscal Year 1984, without raising its general officer ceiling.

The Air Force's four-star exemption was renewed annually, even after Tower left office, until Iosue retired in 1986. The defense authorization act for 1986 added a second four-star exemption for Marine Corps general George B. Crist to serve in that grade as commander in chief of U.S. Central Command. When defense secretary Caspar Weinberger sought a third four-star exemption in 1986 for the chief of the Strategic Defense Initiative Organization (SDIO), James A. Abrahamson, Congress would only renew the Air Force's existing exemption for another year, requiring the Air Force to downgrade ATC if it wanted to promote Abrahamson. Iosue was succeeded by a three-star general, but the Senate never acted on Abrahamson's four-star nomination.

In 1987, Congress replaced the ad hoc grade cap exemptions with a general mechanism allowing up to 15 percent of all three- and four-star grades to be transferred between services by offsetting any increase in one service with a corresponding decrease in another service, keeping the total number constant. This made it easier for services to compete for joint four-star positions, which let the Navy nominate its own candidate to succeed Crist at U.S. Central Command in 1988, in spite of the gentleman's agreement between the Army and Marine Corps to alternate command.

==== Goldwater–Nichols Act ====
The Goldwater–Nichols Department of Defense Reorganization Act of 1986 restructured the Defense Department to improve joint operation after service parochialism and Joint Chiefs of Staff (JCS) dysfunction were blamed for a series of military embarrassments in the early 1980s, especially during the failed 1980 Iranian hostage rescue mission, the 1983 bombings of the Marine barracks in Beirut, and the 1983 invasion of Grenada.

The act elevated the chairman of the JCS above the service chiefs to be the principal military advisor to the president, National Security Council, and secretary of defense, although the other statutory JCS members retained the right to offer independent military advice. It established a four-star vice chairman of the JCS, who ranked second only to the chairman and presided over JCS meetings in the chairman's absence, but was not made a full JCS member until 1992.

The act repealed the ban on creating a unified combatant command for transportation that Congress had attached to the annual defense authorization bill in 1982 at the behest of the Navy, whose secretary, John Lehman, vehemently opposed any centralization at the expense of the services. The Navy also opposed a unified transportation command because it was already using all 9 of its four-star authorizations and could not bid for the new four-star billet without downgrading another, which chief of naval operations Carlisle A. H. Trost refused to do for a command that would be dominated by Air Force units from Military Airlift Command.

In parallel with Goldwater-Nichols, bills were introduced in the House and Senate in May 1986 to unify special operations forces under a new combatant command or defense agency. The Defense Department opposed both bills, proposing instead to create a three-star Special Operations Forces Command. In August, the bills resulted in the Nunn-Cohen amendment to the 1987 defense authorization act, which established a unified combatant command for special operations (U.S. Special Operations Command) with a statutory four-star commander. Congress used similar language to establish combatant commands with statutory four-star commanders for cyber operations (U.S. Cyber Command) in 2016 and joint space warfighting operations (U.S. Space Command) in 2018.

==== Joint four-star positions ====
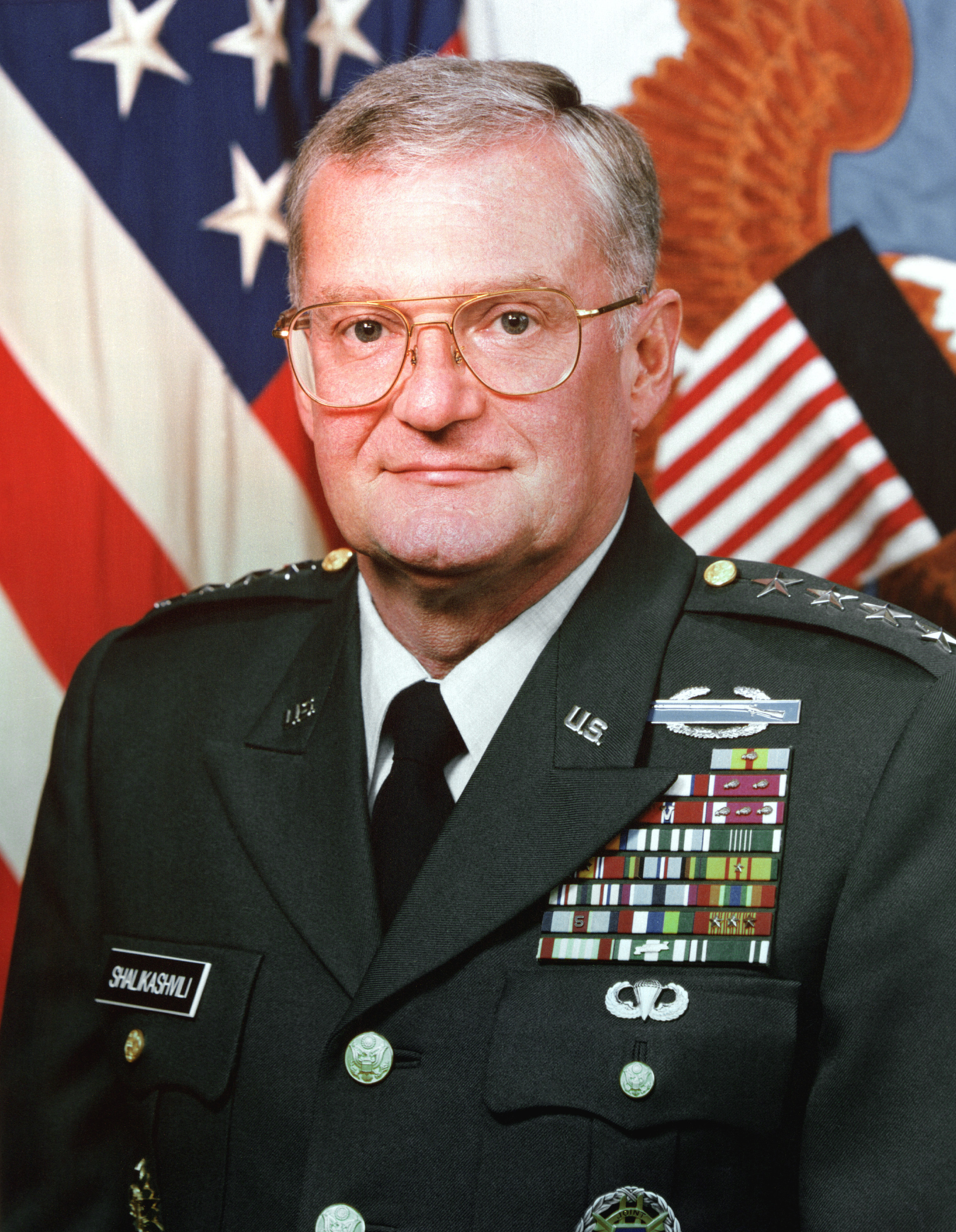
As chairman of the Joint Chiefs of Staff, Army general John Shalikashvili overturned his service's choice for two joint four-star positions by recommending Army general Wesley Clark for them instead.

In 1994, Congress exempted all remaining joint four-star positions from the four-star grade caps, including the commanders of combatant commands and U.S. forces in Korea, and the deputy commander of U.S. European Command if its commander was also the NATO supreme allied commander in Europe (Supreme Allied Commander Europe). To break up the traditional service monopolies on nominally joint commands like U.S. Pacific Command, which was always commanded by a Navy admiral, every service was required to submit at least one candidate for each joint four-star position to the secretary of defense, which Congress enforced by limiting the grade cap exemptions to positions for which that occurred.

To increase competition, the chairman of the Joint Chiefs of Staff could submit his own candidates for joint four-star positions in addition to those nominated by the services. In 1996, Army lieutenant general Marc A. Cisneros was his service's choice to head U.S. Southern Command, but it went to a different Army lieutenant general, Wesley Clark, who was nominated by JCS chairman and Army general John Shalikashvili. The following year, Shalikashvili again got Clark appointed over the Army candidate to be Supreme Allied Commander Europe.

Initially the exemptions did little to increase rotation of joint four-star positions. U.S. Central Command continued to alternate between the Army and Marine Corps, and the new U.S. Strategic Command between the Air Force and Navy. The Navy lost its monopoly on U.S. Atlantic Command when Marine Corps general John J. Sheehan was selected over an Air Force candidate in 1994. The Army lock on U.S. Southern Command broke when Marine Corps general Charles E. Wilhelm succeeded Clark in 1997. The traditional Army post of Supreme Allied Commander Europe went to Air Force general Joseph Ralston in 2000, again in succession to Clark. Other joint four-star positions did not start rotating until 2001, when a new defense secretary, Donald Rumsfeld, made it a policy to appoint combatant commanders from nontraditional services.

In 2002, Rumsfeld reserved the title "commander in chief" for the president of the United States, and discontinued the use of that title or its acronym "CINC" for military officers, mostly combatant commanders, who were redesignated as "commander". Rumsfeld made the change administratively, after the Department of Defense general counsel ruled it did not need legislation.

==== Numerical caps ====
In 2009, Congress directly specified the maximum number of four-star officers in each service, replacing the unwieldy grade cap formula that computed that ceiling as a percentage of total general and flag officer strength. The National Defense Authorization Act for Fiscal Year 2010 provided separate allocations for institutional four-star officers within each service—7 Army generals, 6 Navy admirals, 9 Air Force generals, and 2 Marine Corps generals—and a joint pool of up to 20 four-star officers allocated to the secretary of defense, which at the time included the chairman and vice chairman of the Joint Chiefs of Staff, 9 combatant commanders, and 4 sub-unified commanders for U.S. forces in Korea, Iraq, and Afghanistan, and for cyber warfare. Two years later, Congress eliminated the remaining statutory exemptions for intelligence positions like the director or deputy director of the Central Intelligence Agency, and for the chief of the National Guard Bureau, and charged those four-star positions against the joint pool as well.

In 2011, defense secretary Robert Gates told Congress he intended to cut 4 four-star officers by closing U.S. Joint Forces Command (USJFCOM) and downgrading the Army, Navy, and Air Force component commanders in Europe to three stars. USJFCOM was disestablished and U.S. Army Europe downgraded as planned, but the Navy and Air Force successfully argued that, unlike the Army, their component commanders had collateral NATO duties that needed four stars to head one of its two joint force commands and its air command, both of which were designated by NATO to carry that rank. In 2016, the House version of the annual defense authorization bill would have capped service and functional component commanders at three stars, downgrading the 5 remaining four-star component commanders in Europe (U.S. Naval Forces Europe, U.S. Air Forces in Europe) and the Pacific (U.S. Army Pacific, U.S. Pacific Fleet, Pacific Air Forces). Instead, the National Defense Authorization Act for Fiscal Year 2017 mandated a 25 percent reduction in general and flag officers in all services by the end of 2022. When the Army asked to restore a fourth star to its component commander in Europe and Africa in 2020, Congress raised its limit to 8 generals, keeping the total number of four-star officers constant by transferring a slot from the joint pool to the Army's allocation.

=== Retirement ===
==== Mandatory retirement ====
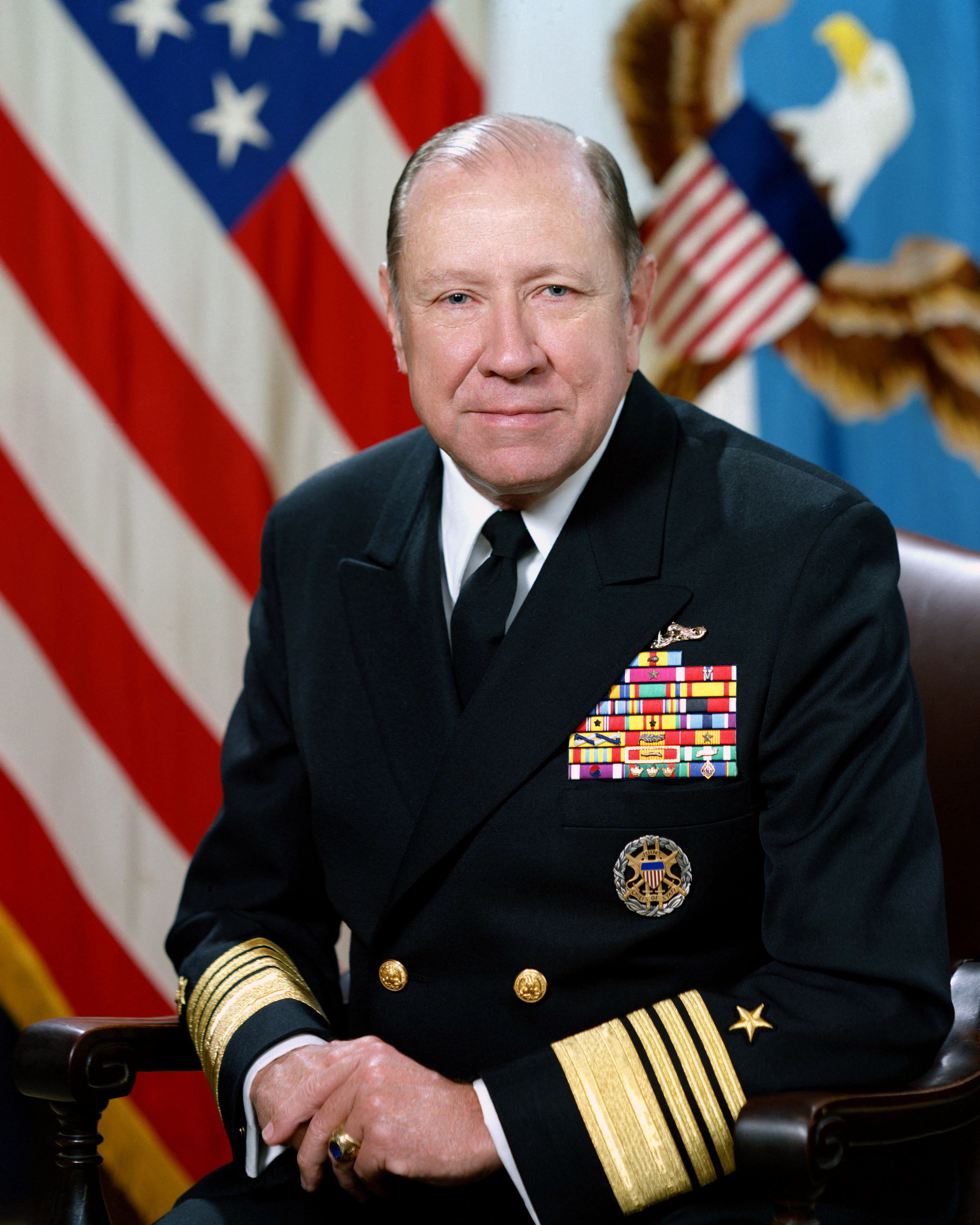
To complete his term as chairman of the Joint Chiefs of Staff, Admiral William J. Crowe needed special legislation to defer his retirement past age 64.

DOPMA kept the mandatory retirement framework of the Officer Personnel Act of 1947. Officers had to retire after 5 years in the regular grade of major general or rear admiral, or 35 years of active commissioned service, whichever was later; or at age 62. The president could defer the retirement of officers in three- and four-star grades up to 5 years past the maximum time in grade or years of service, but not past age 62; or up to 10 deferments until age 64. In September 1989, special legislation retained Admiral William J. Crowe on the active list past the maximum deferment age of 64, to complete his second two-year term as chairman of the Joint Chiefs of Staff.

In May 2003, the Defense Department proposed the Defense Transformation Act for the 21st Century, which would have removed many of the legislative constraints on three- and four-star officer management, including allowing general and flag officers to serve until age 68 and the secretary of defense (then 70-year-old Donald Rumsfeld) to defer their retirement until age 72. Congress stripped most of the general and flag officer management provisions out of that bill, but in November 2006, the annual defense authorization act raised the mandatory retirement age for general and flag officers from 62 to 64, with the secretary of defense allowed to defer retirements until age 66 and the president until age 68. Five months later, 62-year-old Admiral William J. Fallon was appointed commander of U.S. Central Command. The new age limits would have let Fallon complete a standard three-year tour as combatant commander had he not been relieved the following year, at age 63, for injudicious remarks in a magazine article.

==== Recall to active duty ====
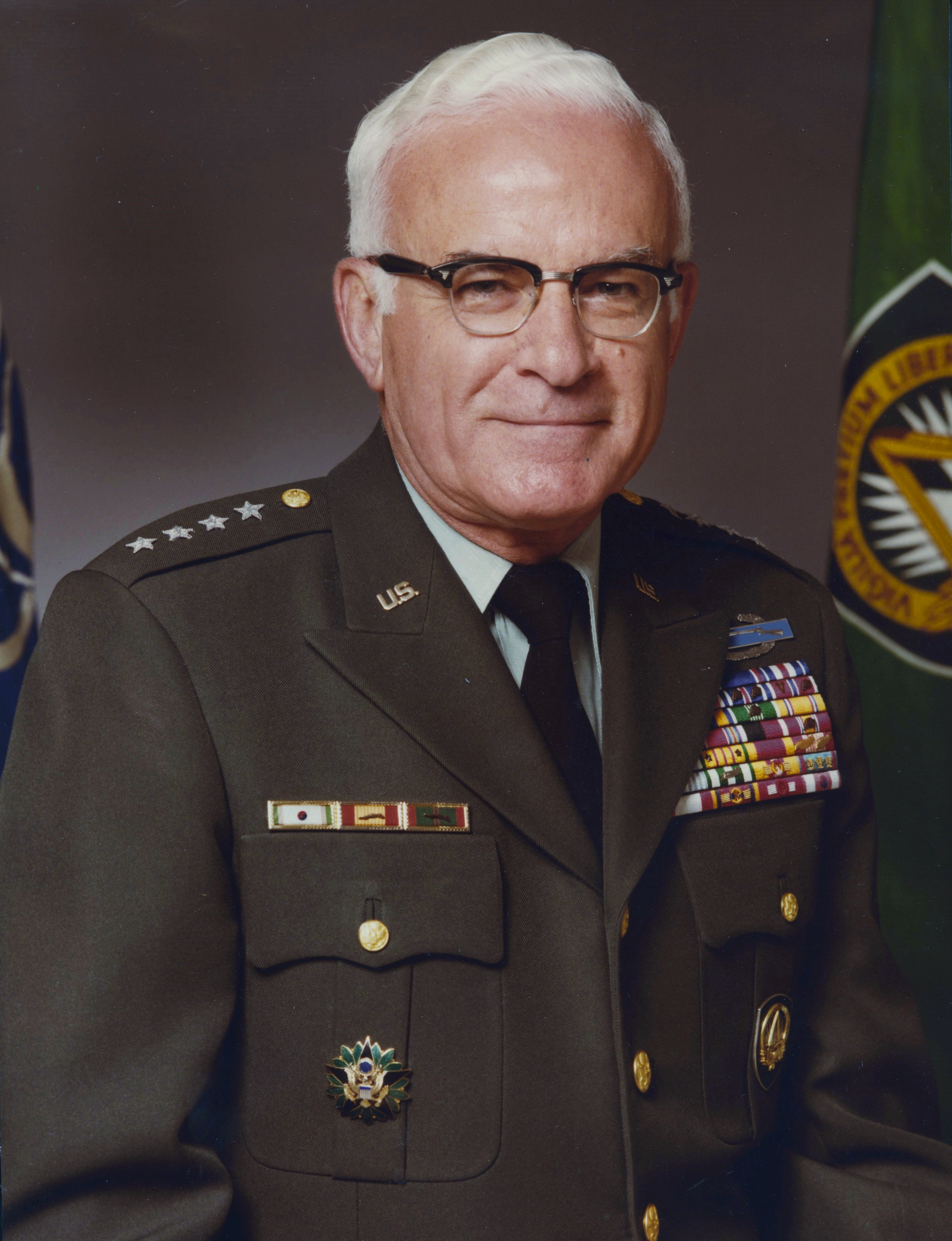
General Bernard W. Rogers remained on active duty as Supreme Allied Commander Europe for nearly two years past the mandatory retirement age of 64.

Service secretaries could recall at most 15 retired general or flag officers in each service to active duty lasting longer than 60 days.

In February 1985, General Bernard W. Rogers was scheduled to step down as Supreme Allied Commander Europe (SACEUR) and commander in chief of U.S. European Command on June 30, 1985, two weeks before reaching the statutory retirement age of 64. Instead, he received a two-year extension in those posts until June 30, 1987, following the 1963 precedent of a previous SACEUR, General Lyman Lemnitzer, who was retired by law at age 64 but immediately recalled to active duty to continue as SACEUR for another six years.

Because Rogers was placed on the retired list with the permanent grade of general, as confirmed by the Senate in May 1985, DOPMA gave the Army secretary administrative authority to recall him to active duty in that grade. However, this implied that a service secretary could fill a four-star job without Senate consent simply by appointing a retired four-star officer. Five months later, the annual defense appropriation act closed that loophole by restricting retired three- and four-star officers to be recalled to active duty in their highest permanent grade held while on the active list, meaning at most two-star grade. Recalling a retired officer to serve in a four-star job thereafter required the same Senate confirmation as any other four-star appointment, as when Admiral Charles R. Larson was retired and immediately recalled to active duty to be four-star superintendent of the Naval Academy in 1994.

==== Transition period ====
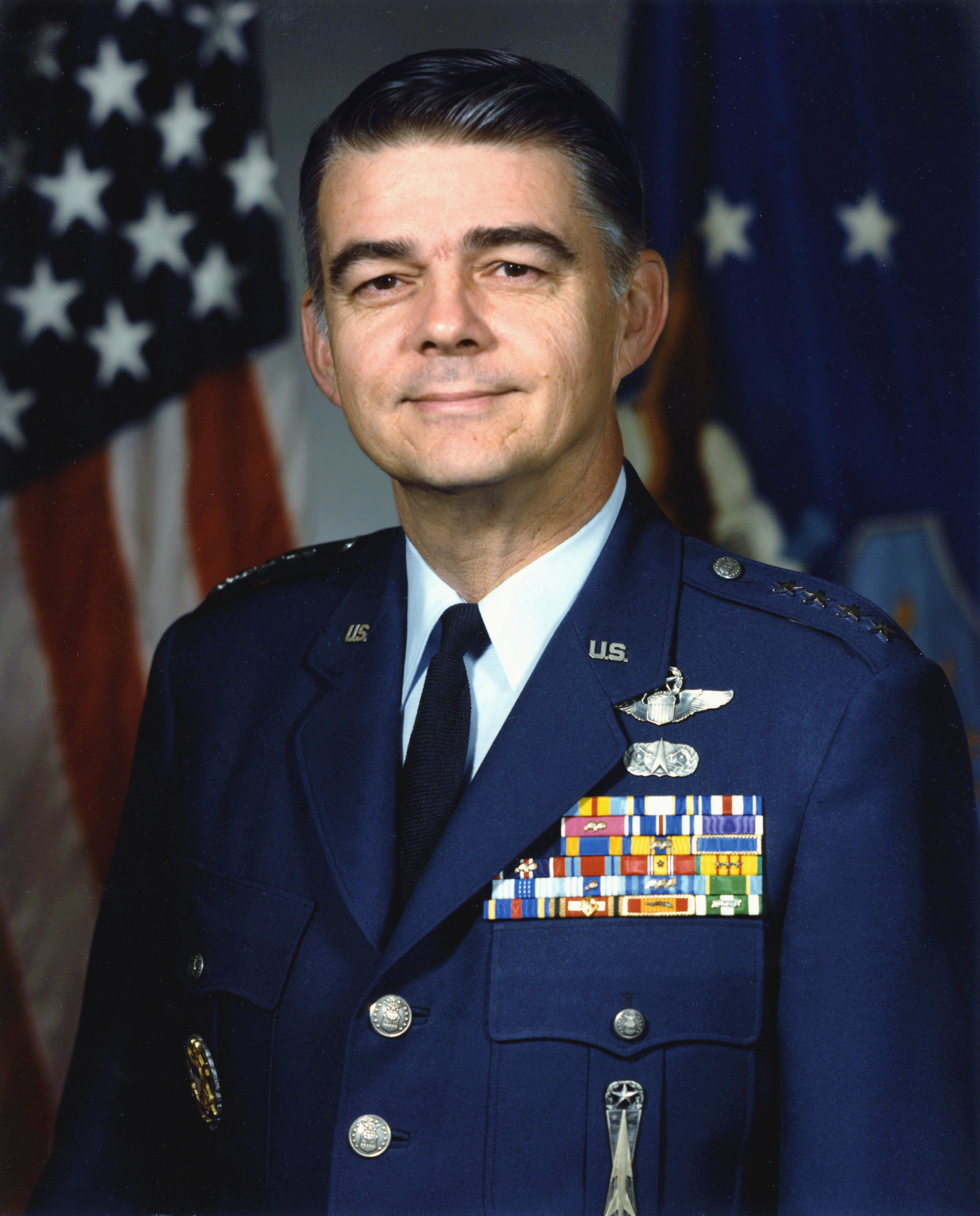
General Michael J. Dugan stayed on active duty as a four-star general long enough after being fired as Air Force chief of staff to benefit from a scheduled pay raise.

Under the Officer Personnel Act, three- and four-star grades were only held while occupying offices designated to carry them. Officers reverted to their permanent two-star grades even while transitioning laterally between three- or four-star jobs or waiting to retire, unless their service created a temporary four-star job to avoid demoting them. For example, Admiral Richard G. Colbert had to revert to rear admiral in 1973 when terminal illness forced him to relinquish his four-star command to be hospitalized, but General Daniel James Jr. kept his four stars under similar circumstances in 1977.

DOPMA established a standard transition period during which any three- or four-star officer could continue to hold that grade after leaving a job designated to carry it. Such officers did not have to revert to their permanent grade while assigned to another three- or four-star position, for up to 180 days while hospitalized, or for up to 90 days while waiting to retire. However, they still counted against the four-star grade caps, although Congress later made exceptions for service chiefs and the chairman (but not vice chairman) of the Joint Chiefs of Staff during their transition into retirement.

The 90-day transition period for retirement was reduced to 60 days in 1991, after Air Force chief of staff Michael J. Dugan was fired for indiscreet comments to the press during Operation Desert Shield. Having left office on September 17, 1990, the 90-day transition period meant Dugan should have retired or reverted to major general by December 16, 1990. Instead, he served as four-star special assistant to the secretary of the Air Force for 106 days, delaying his retirement long enough to benefit from a basic pay raise for generals that took effect on January 1, 1991. The Senate Armed Services Committee objected to the secretary of defense keeping Dugan on active duty just to increase his pension, but approved him to retire with four stars anyway. However, the Senate amended the next year's defense authorization act to reduce the transition period from 90 days to 30 days, which the House changed in conference to 60 days.

In July 1999, defense secretary William Cohen used the 60-day transition period as an excuse to remove General Wesley Clark as Supreme Allied Commander Europe (SACEUR), after clashing repeatedly with Clark during the Kosovo War. The statutory two-year term of General Joseph Ralston as vice chairman of the Joint Chiefs of Staff would expire on February 29, 2000, after which Ralston had 60 days to find another three- or four-star job or else revert to his permanent two-star grade and retire for exceeding 5 years in that grade. Cohen told the White House that Clark would finish a normal three-year combatant commander tour in July 2000, and pitched Ralston's assignment as a routine senior officer rotation that was the only legal way to retain the well-liked Ralston, without mentioning that Clark also had more than 5 years as a permanent major general and would have to retire instead.

Clark was relieved by Ralston on May 3, 2000, and retired. Cohen claimed Clark's tour had to be cut short to meet Ralston's 60-day deadline, but Clark thought another solution could have been found. For example, in December 1991, Admiral Jonathan T. Howe had stepped down as four-star commander in chief of U.S. naval forces in Europe to serve as deputy national security advisor, a civilian position, but special legislation let him keep his four-star grade until his scheduled retirement in June 1992, long past the 60-day transition period.

==== Time-in-grade requirement ====
Until 1996, there was no minimum time-in-grade requirement to retire in three- or four-star grades, unlike lower grades which needed three years of satisfactory service. Even when four-star officers were fired, like U.S. Southern Command commander in chief Frederick F. Woerner Jr. in 1989 and Air Force chief of staff Michael J. Dugan in 1990, or quit their jobs after less than 18 months in grade, like Admirals Bobby Ray Inman and George E. R. Kinnear II in 1982, they were still confirmed by the Senate to retire with four stars.

The National Defense Authorization Act for Fiscal Year 1996 imposed on three- and four-star grades the same three-year time-in-grade requirement as for lower grades, but the president could waive this requirement if the officer was not being investigated for misconduct. Air Force chief of staff T. Michael Moseley was being investigated for ethics violations regarding a government contract when he was fired over an unrelated nuclear weapons mishandling incident in 2008, but did not need a time-in-grade waiver to retire with four stars, having held that rank for almost five years. In 2010, General Stanley A. McChrystal was fired as commander of multinational forces in Afghanistan after only a year in grade but was still approved to retire as a four-star general.

==== Senate confirmation ====
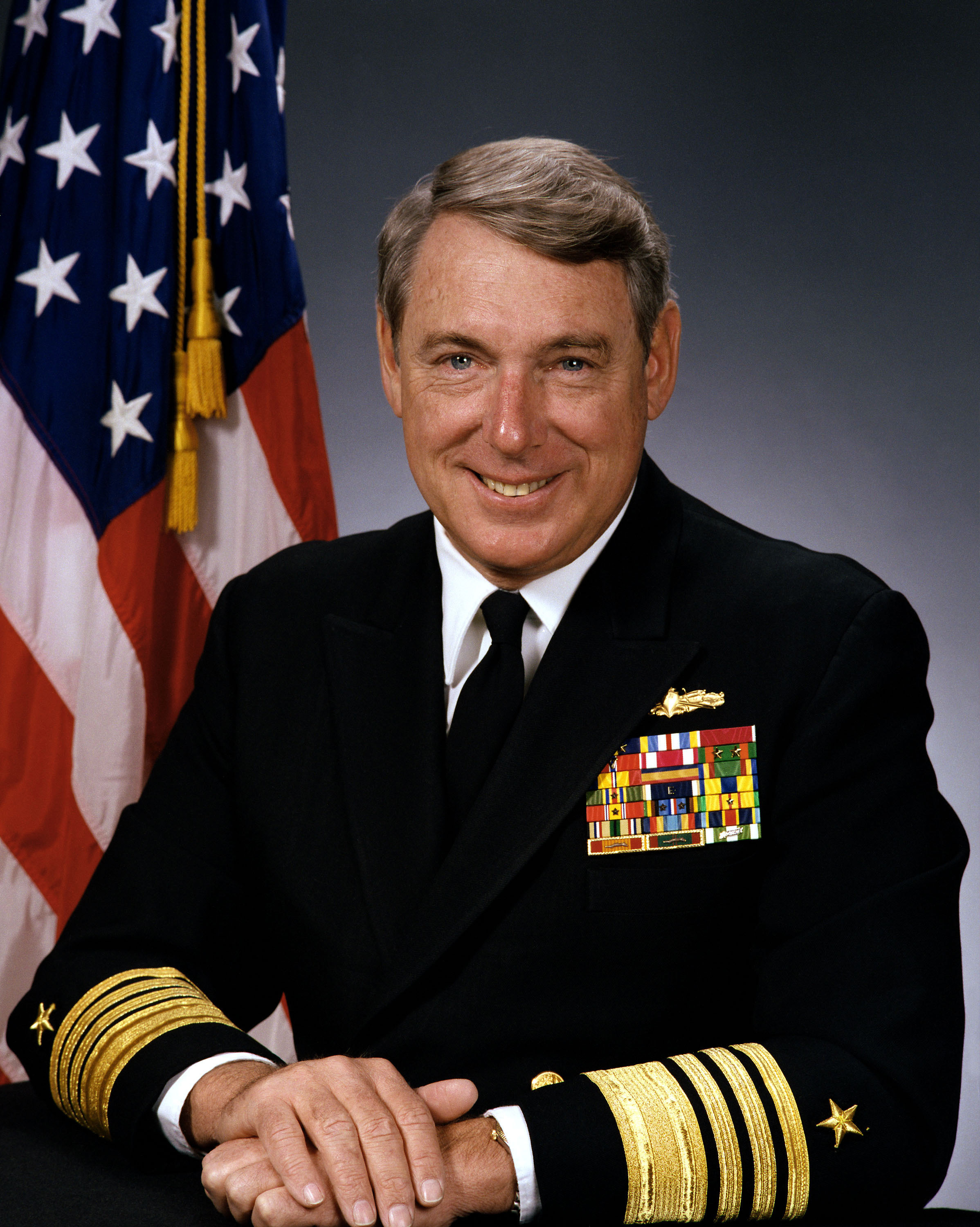
Controversy over the retirement of Admiral Henry H. Mauz Jr. resulted in the secretary of defense approving three- and four-star retirements, instead of a vote by the full Senate.

Promotion to three- and four-star grades on the retired list originally required the same presidential nomination and Senate confirmation as an active-duty assignment. The Senate routinely confirmed three- and four-star officers to retire in grade until the early 1990s, when a series of controversial retirements drew heightened scrutiny, first from the Senate Armed Services Committee and then from the Senate at large.

In 1991, the Senate Armed Services Committee prevented Air Force personnel chief Thomas J. Hickey from retiring with three stars, after the Air Force ignored directives to ensure the DOPMA-mandated independence of general officer promotion boards. Two years later, Senator Chuck Grassley, who was not on the Senate Armed Services Committee, cited the Hickey precedent when trying to block the three-star retirement of Lieutenant General Buster C. Glosson, who had been slated for promotion to four-star Air Force vice chief of staff in late 1993 but was instead forced to retire for tampering with a major general selection board. After a long investigation, during which Glosson reverted to two stars and retired, a divided Senate Armed Services Committee voted 14 to 7 to restore Glosson's third star on the retired list, which the full Senate confirmed in October 1994 by an unusually close vote of 59 to 30.

In the aftermath of the 1991 Tailhook sexual assault scandal, several four-star retirements and nominations in the Navy drew extra attention from senators outside the Senate Armed Services Committee. In April 1994, the chief of naval operations, Frank Kelso, who had nearly been fired for his role in the scandal, stepped down two months early as part of a deal that let him retire with four stars, which the Senate Armed Services Committee approved 20 to 2. However, all seven women in the Senate opposed this deal, sparking a six-hour debate on the floor of the Senate, which confirmed Kelso's four-star retirement by an unexpectedly close margin of 54 to 43. Spooked by Kelso's narrow escape, two months later the Navy withdrew the nomination of vice chief of naval operations Stanley R. Arthur to be commander in chief of U.S. Pacific Command, rather than risk another confirmation battle after Senator David Durenberger placed a hold on his nomination to pressure the Navy about a constituent's claim of being dropped from naval flight training after reporting sexual harassment by her instructor.

The tipping point came in September 1994, when Atlantic Fleet commander in chief Henry H. Mauz Jr. became the third four-star admiral that year to face a difficult confirmation by the Senate. The Senate Armed Services Committee unanimously approved Mauz to retire with four stars after a Navy inquiry dismissed allegations that he mishandled investigations of sexual harassment and whistleblowing under his command, but Senator Patty Murray and four other senators were unconvinced and called for a public hearing. By then, senior military officials felt senators were politicizing confirmation votes to pursue agendas that had little to do with the actual nominees. Murray backed down after Senate Armed Services Committee chairman Sam Nunn promised to revise the nomination process to better anticipate questions about high-profile military nominees before they were presented to the full Senate, and to seek legislative changes in the next Congress. The Senate confirmed Mauz to retire with four stars 92 to 6. The next defense authorization bill eliminated the increasingly contentious confirmation votes by transferring authority to approve three- and four-star retirements to the secretary of defense.

==== Certification of retired grade ====
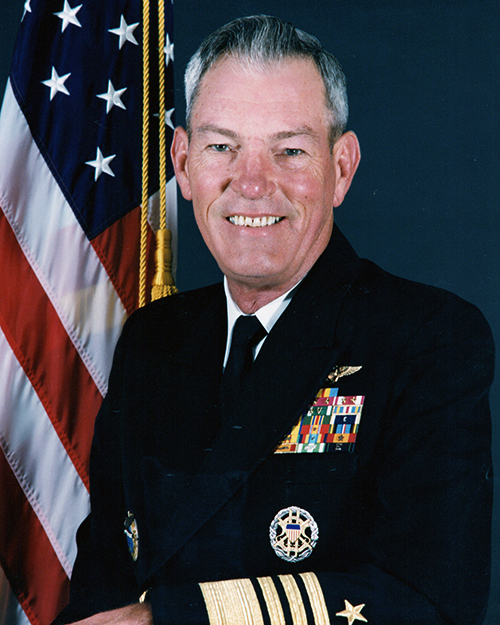
Navy four-star admiral Richard C. Macke retired with two stars due to misconduct unrelated to the 1995 Okinawa rape incident that forced his early retirement.

The National Defense Authorization Act for Fiscal Year 1996 changed retirements in three- and four-star grades to follow a similar approval process as one- and two-star grades. Three- and four-star retirements no longer required a confirmation vote by the Senate. Instead, the secretary of defense had to certify in writing that officers served satisfactorily in those grades, which now required three years of service in order to retire in them, the same as lower grades. The president could waive the time-in-grade requirement, but not while an officer was being investigated for misconduct.

The first four-star officer to retire in a lower grade under the new rules was Admiral Richard C. Macke, commander in chief of U.S. Pacific Command. On November 17, 1995, Macke made an insensitive remark to reporters about the 1995 Okinawa rape incident that forced him to accept early retirement a few hours later. Initially expected to step down immediately, Macke did not relinquish command until January 31, 1996, one day after his successor was confirmed by the Senate, in part because the decision to nominate him to retire with four stars depended on the Department of Defense inspector general's investigation into separate allegations that the divorced admiral had been dating subordinate officers and using military aircraft to visit them. The rule change went into effect on February 10. Macke had served less than two years as a four-star admiral and the three-year time-in-grade requirement could not be waived while he was under investigation, so he reverted to rear admiral and retired on April 1, 60 days after leaving his four-star post. In October, the investigation finally concluded with a letter of censure for Macke, and the secretary of defense declined to approve a higher retired grade.

In 2005, General Kevin P. Byrnes was fired as four-star commanding general of Training and Doctrine Command several months before his scheduled retirement, for violating an order from the Army chief of staff to break off relations with the subject of the adulterous affair he was conducting while separated from his wife, and was certified to retire as a three-star general.

==== Adverse information ====
Adverse information concerning a general or flag officer must be reported to the Senate Armed Services Committee before any promotion, change of assignment, or retirement. The current disclosure rules trace to a 1988 incident in which the Senate confirmed Lieutenant General John F. Wall to retire in grade in May, only to discover in July that he had received a letter of reprimand in March that was not included in his nomination package. The Senate Armed Services Committee then required any nomination to report any adverse or reportable information such as a substantiated finding of misconduct or other unfavorable publicity.

Four-star officers typically could not be retired or transferred to another four-star position while under investigation, although they could be fired. In 2010, Generals Roger A. Brady and Stephen R. Lorenz were held in their four-star posts for up to 13 months past their original change-of-command dates, pending the completion of a four-year investigation by the Department of Defense comptroller into permanent change of station overspending when they were the three-star generals on the Air Staff responsible for personnel and budgeting. The week before Admiral James G. Stavridis was to be announced as the next chief of naval operations in February 2011, his assignment was derailed by an investigation into his travel and spending that forced him to remain Supreme Allied Commander Europe until the investigation concluded 20 months later, resulting in administrative counseling but no formal reprimand and freeing him to retire in grade in May 2013. Another Navy admiral, Samuel J. Locklear III, was held in his post as commander of U.S. Pacific Command until being cleared of involvement in the Fat Leonard scandal in 2015.

After General William E. Ward relinquished command of U.S. Africa Command on March 9, 2011, but before his scheduled retirement in April, the Department of Defense inspector general received multiple complaints about his travel and spending while in command. Held on active duty until the investigation was complete, Ward reverted to major general on May 8, 60 days after leaving his four-star post. The investigation took 17 months to conclude that Ward had committed misconduct, and he was retired as a lieutenant general in November 2012.

==== Honorary promotions ====
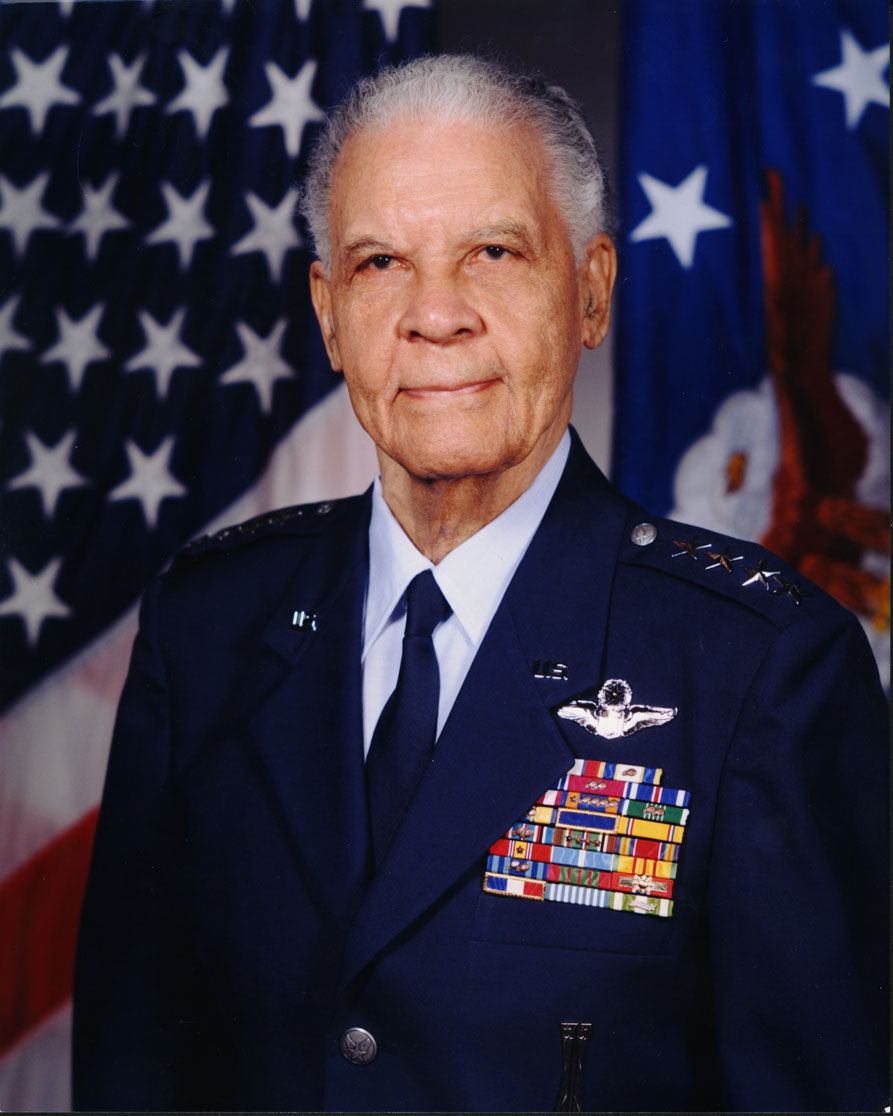
Retired Air Force lieutenant general Benjamin O. Davis Jr. received an honorary fourth star in 1998.

On rare occasions, Congress approved honorary fourth stars for officers on the retired list, with no increase in pay or benefits, using either special legislation or the plenary power shared by the president and Senate under the Appointments Clause of the Constitution.

In April 1985, retired Air Force lieutenant generals James H. Doolittle and Ira C. Eaker were advanced to the grade of general on the retired list at the behest of the chairman of the Senate Armed Services Committee, Arizona senator and former presidential nominee Barry Goldwater. The authority to appoint officers to three- and four-star grades under DOPMA did not extend to retired reservists like Doolittle, so Goldwater sought special legislation similar to that used previously to promote retired Air Force lieutenant general Claire L. Chennault and retired Navy admiral Hyman G. Rickover. A joint resolution sponsored by Goldwater passed unanimously in the Senate, but was blocked in the House by members pressuring Goldwater for concessions on other issues. Outraged, Goldwater convinced the president to instead invoke the Appointments Clause of the Constitution to nominate Doolittle and Eaker, and the Senate confirmed their promotions the same day. Unlike Goldwater's joint resolution, the Appointments Clause did not forbid any increase in pay or benefits resulting from the promotion, but the Comptroller General ruled that Eaker and Doolittle were not entitled to higher retired pay, not having served on active duty in that grade for at least six months.

In October 1998, another Arizona senator and future presidential nominee, John McCain, obtained special legislation to advance retired Air Force lieutenant general Benjamin O. Davis Jr. to full general on the retired list, with no additional pay or benefits. The president promoted Davis to that grade in December.

Subsequent attempts to promote officers to posthumous four-star grades were unsuccessful. Successive administrations declined to posthumously advance former Navy admiral Husband E. Kimmel and former Army lieutenant general Walter C. Short to those grades on the retired list, as authorized in 2000 by the annual defense authorization act, which held that they were not responsible for the 1941 attack on Pearl Harbor for which they had been relieved of their four- and three-star commands and retired in their permanent two-star grades. Conversely, the Senate declined to vote on the nomination of former Air Force general John D. Lavelle to be posthumously advanced to that grade on the retired list under the Appointments Clause in 2010, after new evidence surfaced that the White House had actually approved the supposedly unauthorized airstrikes for which he was retired as a major general in 1972.

=== Compensation ===
==== Pay caps ====
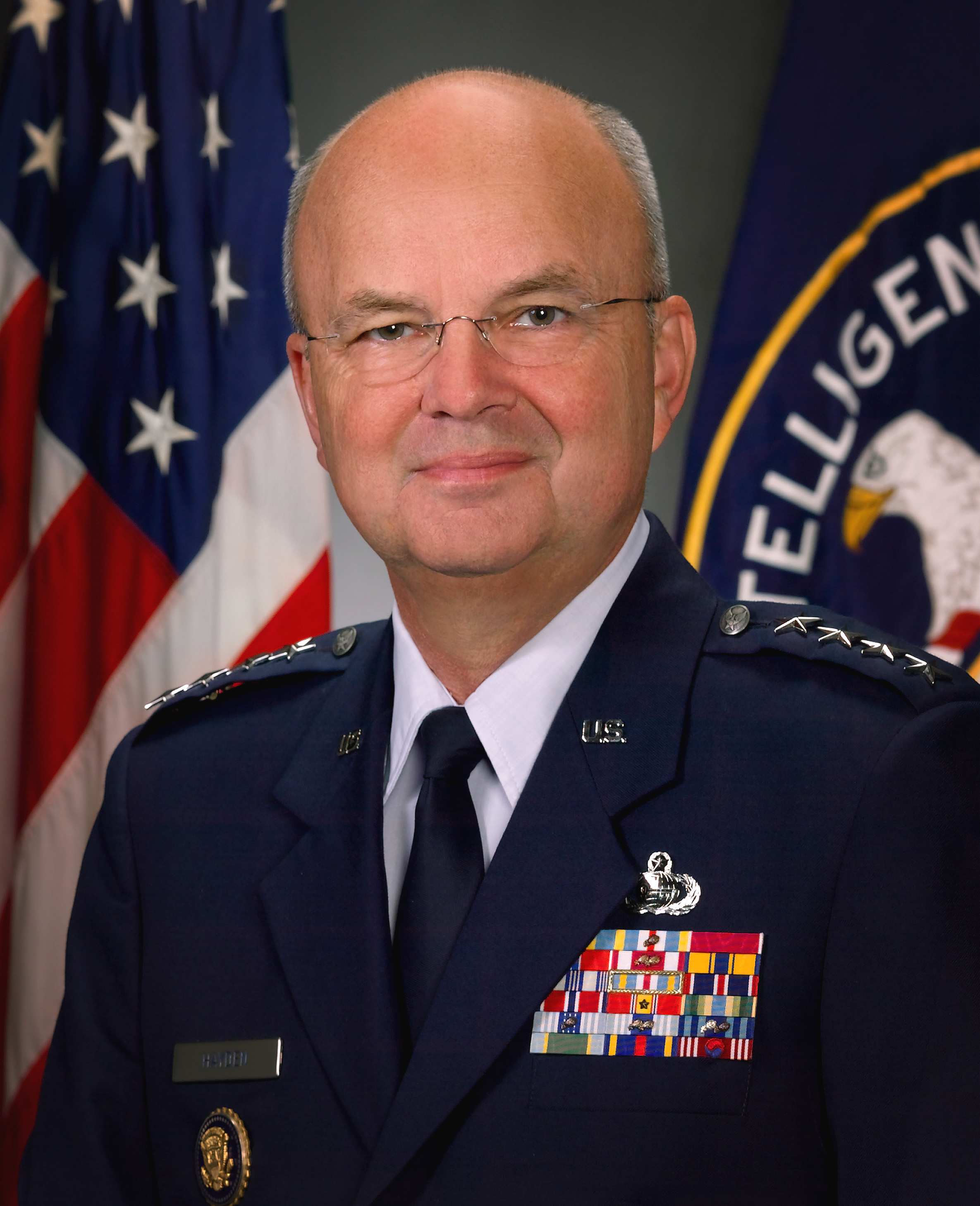
CIA director Michael Hayden retired from the Air Force in 2008.

Military pay was capped in the early 1970s at Level V of the Executive Schedule, matching the civil service salary cap in the Federal Salary Act of 1967. By 1999, the Executive Schedule cap had so compressed the pay table that there was almost no difference in pay between O-9 lieutenant generals and vice admirals, O-10 generals and admirals, and O-10 members of the Joint Chiefs of Staff. The National Defense Authorization Act for Fiscal Year 2000 increased the pay cap from Executive Schedule Level V to Level III.

To help retain senior officers during the Afghanistan and Iraq wars, the Pentagon asked Congress in 2003 to uncap retired pay. The National Defense Authorization Act for Fiscal Year 2007 increased the active-duty basic pay cap from Level III to Level II of the Executive Schedule, and also increased maximum retired pay from 75 percent of capped basic pay to 75 percent of uncapped basic pay plus 2.5 percent for every year past 30 years of service, which could exceed 100 percent after 40 years of service.

Director of the Central Intelligence Agency (CIA) Michael Hayden, an active-duty four-star general, retired from the Air Force in 2008 but continued to serve as CIA director, taking advantage of the more generous retired pay formula while assuaging concerns about an active-duty military officer serving as CIA director. His 39 years of service entitled him to a military pension of 97.5 percent of his active-duty pay of $208,000 a year as a four-star general, plus a civilian salary as CIA director of $172,000 a year, for a total annual income of $373,825 (equivalent to $559,004 in 2025). When Hayden was appointed CIA director in 2006, basic pay for a four-star general was capped at about $152,000 a year, with retired pay capped at 75 percent of basic pay after 30 years of service, for a combined annual income of $286,000 (equivalent to $456,760 in 2025) if he had retired when appointed CIA director.

The National Defense Authorization Act for Fiscal Year 2015 reinstated the previous method of computing retired pay for general and flag officers using capped basic pay, after the Senate Armed Services Committee determined that the higher pensions derived from uncapped basic pay did not affect retention of top officers.

=== Positions ===
==== Army ====
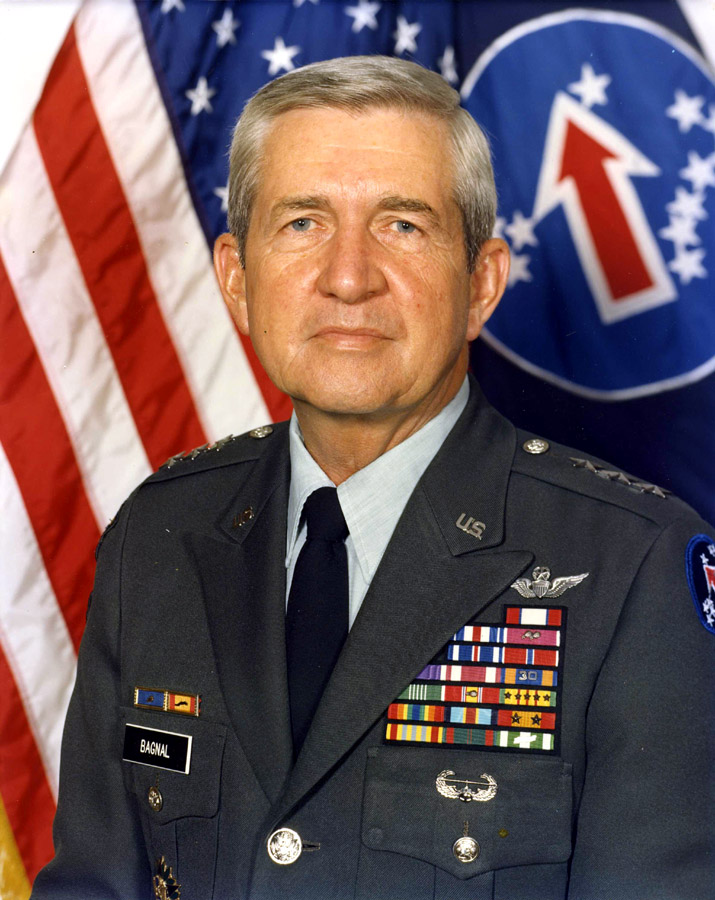
WESTCOM commanding general Charles W. Bagnal was denied promotion to four-star general in 1988, as the Senate Armed Services Committee had rejected the proposed elevation of his command.

In April 1981, the Army employed 9 of the 15 four-star generals it was authorized by the DOPMA grade cap formula.

- 6 generals served inside the Army as chief and vice chief of staff of the Army (CSA, VCSA), as commander in chief of U.S. Army Europe (CINCUSAREUR), and as commanding generals of Forces Command (CG FORSCOM), Training and Doctrine Command (CG TRADOC), and Materiel Development and Readiness Command (CG DARCOM).
- 3 generals served outside the Army as Supreme Allied Commander Europe (dual-hatted as commander in chief of U.S. European Command) (SACEUR/USCINCEUR), as commander in chief of U.S. Readiness Command (USCINCRED), and as commander of U.S. forces in Korea (quadruple-hatted as commander in chief of United Nations Command and ROK/US Combined Forces Command and as commanding general of Eighth Army) (CINCUNC/CINCCFC/COMUSFK/CG EUSA).

Unlike the Air Force and Navy, the Army typically operated below its statutory four-star ceiling. For example, in 1987 the Army employed only 11 of the 15 four-star generals authorized by the DOPMA grade cap formula based on its 407 general officers. Nevertheless, the Senate Armed Services Committee rejected the Army's proposal to upgrade its three-star Western Command (WESTCOM), the Army component command in the Pacific, never voting on the nomination of WESTCOM commanding general Charles W. Bagnal to be the Army's twelfth four-star general, and a 1988 review of unified and specified commands recommended that WESTCOM be disestablished as superfluous.

The National Defense Authorization Act for Fiscal Year 2010 allocated the Army 7 four-star generals for positions within the service, but it employed only 6 at the time: the Army chief and vice chief of staff (CSA, VCSA); the commanding generals of Forces Command (FORSCOM), Training and Doctrine Command (TRADOC), Army Materiel Command (AMC); and the Army component commander in Europe (USAREUR), which was downgraded to three stars in 2011, dropping the Army to 5 institutional four-star generals. The trend reversed in 2013 when the sixth four-star slot was revived for the Army component commander in the Pacific (USARPAC, successor to WESTCOM), and the seventh four-star slot went to Army Futures Command (AFC) when it was established in 2018. When the Army wanted an eighth four-star slot to upgrade the Army component commander in Europe and Africa (USAREUR-AF) in 2020, Congress transferred one from the joint pool to the Army's allocation, keeping the total number of four-star officers constant.

==== Air Force ====
In April 1981, the Air Force employed 13 four-star generals, including all 12 it was authorized by the DOPMA grade cap formula plus an extra general serving as chairman of the Joint Chiefs of Staff.

- 1 general served as chairman of the Joint Chiefs of Staff (CJCS) and was exempt from grade caps.
- 9 generals served inside the Air Force as chief and vice chief of staff of the Air Force (CSAF, VCSAF); as commanders in chief of Strategic Air Command (CINCSAC), Military Airlift Command (CINCMAC), and U.S. Air Forces in Europe (CINCUSAFE); and as commanders of Tactical Air Command (COMTAC), Air Training Command (COMATC), Air Force Logistics Command (COMAFLC), and Air Force Systems Command (COMAFSC).
- 3 generals served outside the Air Force as chief of staff of NATO's Supreme Headquarters Allied Powers Europe (COFS SHAPE), as deputy commander in chief of U.S. European Command (DCINCEUR), and as U.S. military representative to the NATO Military Committee (USMILREP), a position that cycled between the Army, Air Force, and Navy.

Air Force secretary Verne Orr decided that 4 of 12 authorized four-star generals was too high a proportion to spend on Europe, and transferred USMILREP Richard L. Lawson to COFS SHAPE in July 1981, releasing the joint USMILREP position to rotate to the Navy and returning a fourth star to the commander in chief of North American Aerospace Defense Command (CINCNORAD), which had been downgraded to three stars. Orr also wanted to transfer the fourth star from ATC to Pacific Air Forces (PACAF), which required legislation to temporarily allow a thirteenth general in 1983. The Air Force still had no available four-star slot to resume its turn in the USMILREP rotation in 1985, so Army general Roscoe Robinson Jr. was succeeded by another Army general, Jack N. Merritt, and thereafter by Navy admirals until the position was downgraded to three stars in 1993.

The National Defense Authorization Act for Fiscal Year 2010 authorized the Air Force 9 four-star generals for positions within the service, which at the time were the Air Force chief and vice chief of staff; the commanders of Air Combat Command (ACC), Air Mobility Command (AMC), Air Force Materiel Command (AFMC), Air Force Space Command (AFSPC), and Air Education and Training Command (AETC); and the Air Force component commanders in Europe (USAFE) and the Pacific (PACAF). AETC was downgraded to three stars in 2015 to transfer its four-star billet to Air Force Global Strike Command (AFGSC). AFSPC was redesignated as the United States Space Force (USSF) in 2019.

==== Navy ====
In April 1981, the Navy employed 8 of the 9 four-star admirals it was authorized by the DOPMA grade cap formula.

- 7 admirals served inside the Navy as chief and vice chief of naval operations (CNO, VCNO); as commanders in chief of the U.S. Pacific Fleet (CINCPACFLT), U.S. Atlantic Fleet (triple-hatted as NATO supreme allied commander in the Atlantic and commander in chief of U.S. Atlantic Command) (SACLANT/CINCLANT/CINCLANTFLT), and U.S. Naval Forces Europe (dual-hatted as NATO commander in chief of Allied Forces Southern Europe) (CINCSOUTH/CINCUSNAVEUR); as chief of naval material (CNM); and as director of the naval nuclear propulsion program in the Naval Sea Systems Command (dual-hatted as deputy assistant secretary of energy for naval reactors) (NAVSEA 08).
- 1 admiral served outside the Navy as commander in chief of U.S. Pacific Command (USCINCPAC).

In February 1985, responding to a procurement scandal made notorious by $600 toilet seats, Navy secretary John Lehman abolished Naval Material Command, forcing chief of naval material Steven A. White to retire. This freed a four-star slot to split the triple-hatted SACLANT/CINCLANT/CINCLANTFLT job, which the Navy had wanted to do since the 1960s, with one admiral commanding the Atlantic Fleet (CINCLANTFLT) and a second admiral handling NATO and joint duties (SACLANT/CINCLANT). The ninth four-star authorization was reserved for the rotational billet of U.S. military representative to the NATO Military Committee (USMILREP) until that position was downgraded to three stars in 1993.

The National Defense Authorization Act for Fiscal Year 2010 authorized the Navy 6 four-star admirals for positions within the service, corresponding to the chief and vice chief of naval operations (CNO, VCNO), the commander of Fleet Forces Command (USFFC, successor to USLANTFLT), the Navy component commanders in Europe (USNAVEUR) and the Pacific (USPACFLT), and the director of naval nuclear propulsion (NAVSEA-08).

==== Marine Corps ====
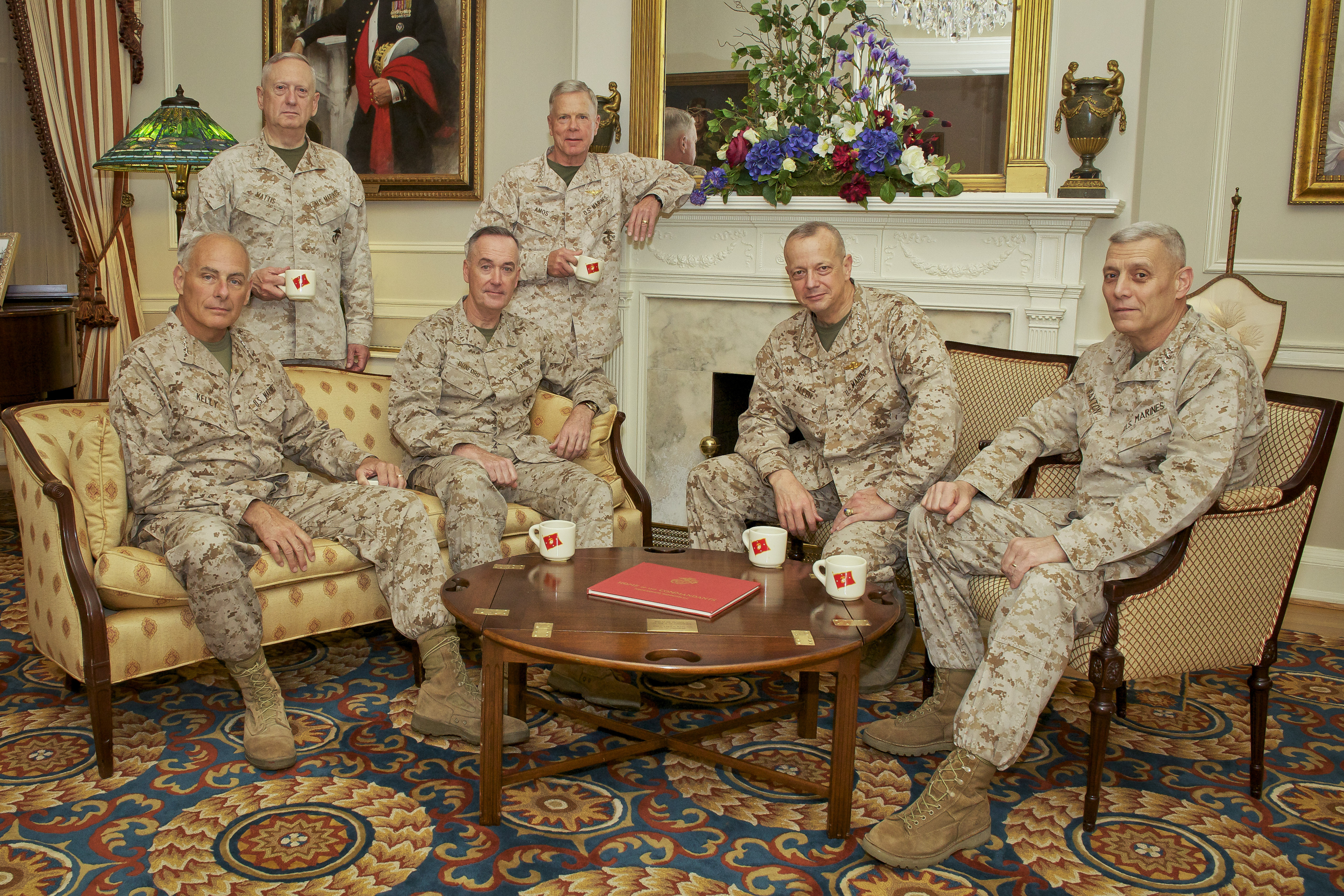
The Marine Corps briefly had 6 four-star generals on active duty in 2013: John F. Kelly, Jim Mattis, Joseph Dunford, James F. Amos, John R. Allen, and John M. Paxton Jr.

In April 1981, the Marine Corps was authorized up to 9 three- or four-star officers by the DOPMA grade cap formula, of which it employed 2 as four-star generals: the commandant and assistant commandant of the Marine Corps (CMC/ACMC). When General George B. Crist was selected as commander in chief of U.S. Central Command in 1985, the annual defense authorization act exempted his four-star position from the Marine Corps grade caps. The National Defense Authorization Act for Fiscal Year 2010 authorized the Marine Corps 2 four-star generals for positions within the service, corresponding to the CMC and ACMC.

Starting in 1991, the Marine Corps typically had at least one four-star combatant commander at any given time, and occasionally had as many as 5 four-star generals on active duty, including the CMC and ACMC, two combatant commanders, and one other joint position such as chairman of the Joint Chiefs of Staff (CJCS) or commander of the International Security Assistance Force (ISAF) in Afghanistan. In 2013, the Marine Corps briefly had 6 four-star generals on active duty before outgoing ISAF commander John R. Allen declined a follow-on assignment as Supreme Allied Commander Europe and retired.

==== Chairman of the Joint Chiefs of Staff ====
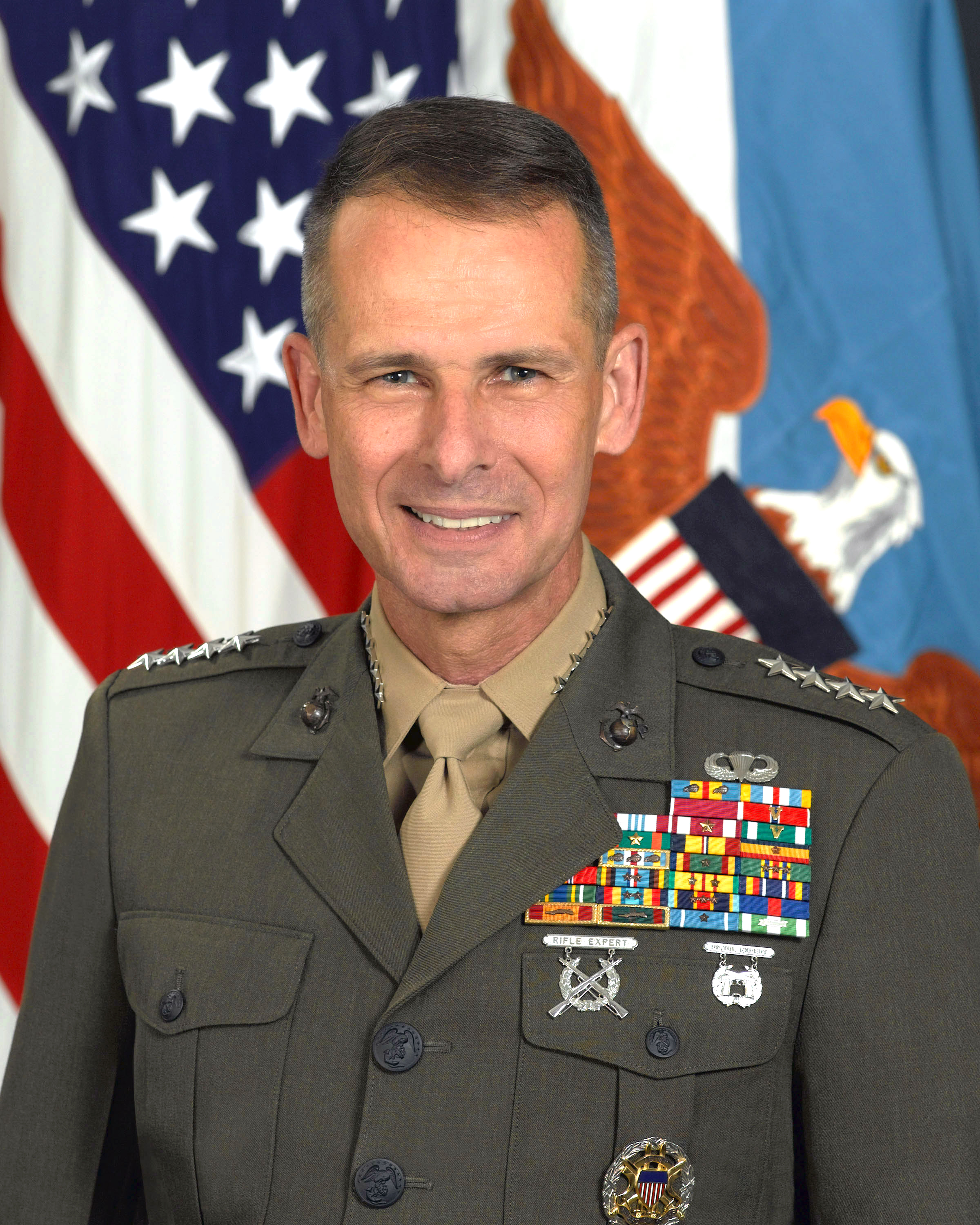
General Peter Pace was the only chairman of the Joint Chiefs of Staff after the passage of the Goldwater-Nichols Act to be denied a second two-year term.

The Goldwater–Nichols Act elevated the chairman of the Joint Chiefs of Staff (JCS) to principal military adviser to the president, National Security Council, and secretary of defense, a role previously played by the Joint Chiefs of Staff collectively. Other statutory JCS members retained the right to give their own military advice, which the chairman was required to relay to the president.

Since every president wanted a chairman who was compatible in policy and personality, and not just a holdover from the previous administration, the Senate set the chairman's renewable two-year term to expire six months after the election of a new president. The House rejected this provision but achieved a similar effect by ending the chairman's term in October of odd-numbered years, so that new presidents could select their own chairman early in their first term. This worked until 2007, when the chairman had to be replaced more than halfway through the president's four-year term, after the Senate Armed Services Committee blamed the JCS for poor leadership in the increasingly unpopular Iraq War and discouraged defense secretary Robert Gates from nominating General Peter Pace for a second two-year term, the only chairman in the Goldwater-Nichols era to be denied reappointment.

Gates later advised Congress to replace the renewable two-year terms of the chairman and vice chairman with a single four-year appointment. Not only would this strengthen their positions relative to the service chiefs, who already had four-year terms, and the combatant commanders, who nominally had three-year terms, but guaranteeing that the chairman and vice chairman were in their final appointments would free them to offer military advice without worrying about future confirmation votes. Congress implemented Gates' suggestion in 2016.

==== Vice chairman of the Joint Chiefs of Staff ====
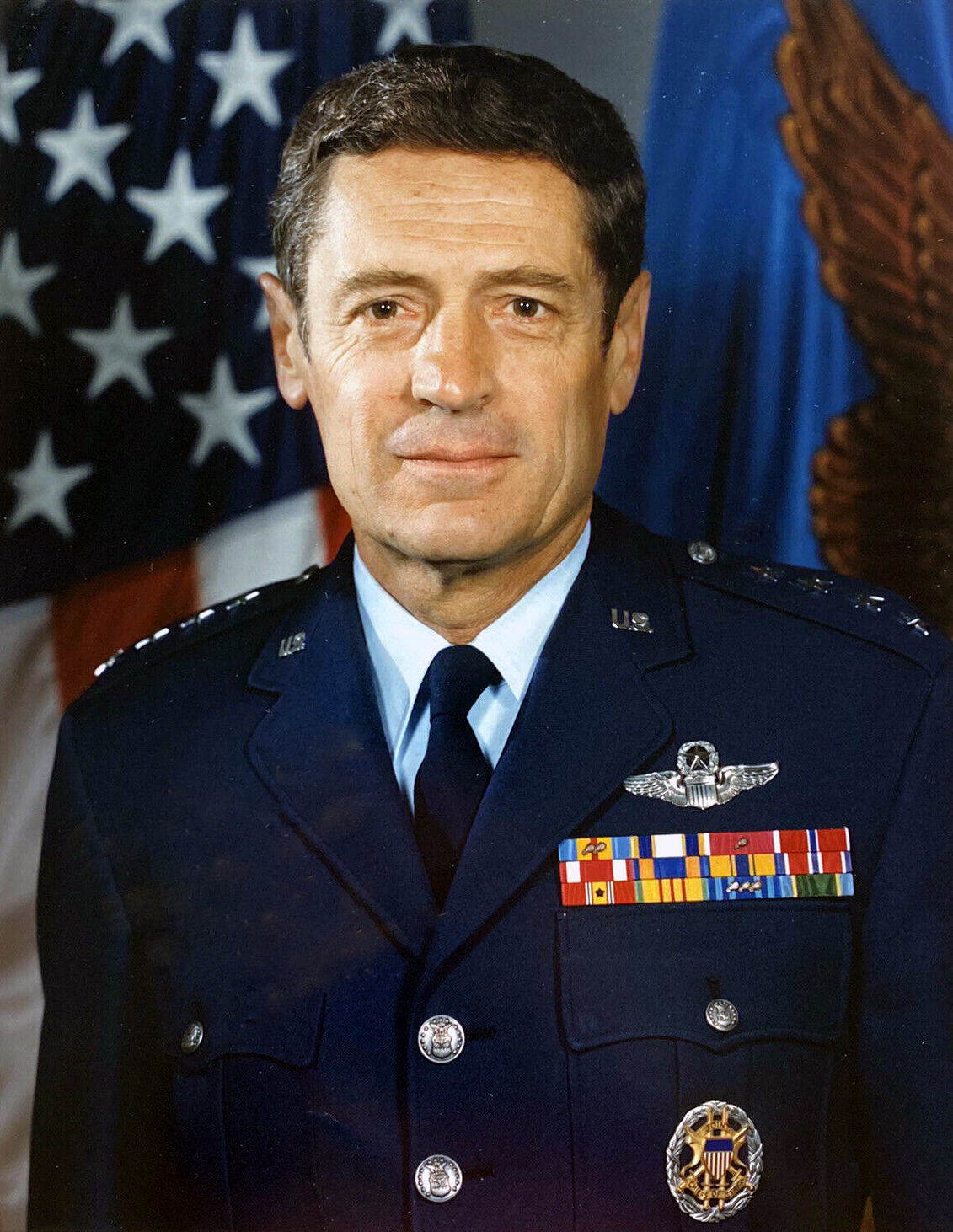
General Robert T. Herres, first vice chairman of the Joint Chiefs of Staff.

The Goldwater–Nichols Act established a four-star vice chairman of the Joint Chiefs of Staff (JCS), who outranked all other officers in the military services except the chairman of the JCS. Like the chairman, the vice chairman could serve up to three two-year terms and was excluded from the four-star grade caps. The vice chairman could not be from the same service as the chairman except during a brief overlap for new officers to take over, a rule that forced Navy admiral Edmund Giambastiani to step down as vice chairman in 2007 after a single two-year term when another Navy admiral, Michael Mullen, was unexpectedly made chairman after Marine Corps general Peter Pace was not reappointed.

Originally, the vice chairman could participate in JCS meetings but not vote unless acting as chairman, but became a full JCS member in 1992 with the same statutory right to provide independent military advice to the president as the service chiefs. The first vice chairman, Air Force general Robert T. Herres, was recommended by Navy admiral William J. Crowe to succeed him as chairman, to signal to other four-star officers that the new position was not a career dead end. Subsequent vice chairmen were almost always considered viable candidates for chairman, and two were actually appointed: Pace and his predecessor as both chairman and vice chairman, Air Force general Richard Myers. Marine Corps general James E. Cartwright was the frontrunner to succeed Mullen as chairman in 2011, but lost the promotion in part because he angered Mullen and defense secretary Robert Gates by delivering independent military advice to the president as a statutory JCS member that undermined their preferred Afghanistan War policy.

To improve the quality of military advice provided to civilian leaders, the National Defense Authorization Act for Fiscal Year 2017 barred the vice chairman from promotion to chairman or any other position in the armed forces, and replaced the renewable two-year terms of the chairman and vice chairman with a single four-year appointment, starting in 2021. This removed any incentive to preserve future appointments by withholding advice that would offend superiors or Congress. The terms of the chairman and vice chairman were staggered to prevent both positions from turning over at the same time. The last vice chairman appointed under the old rules was Air Force general John E. Hyten, who achieved the desired staggering of the chairman and vice chairman by retiring after a single two-year term in 2021.

==== Chief of the National Guard Bureau ====
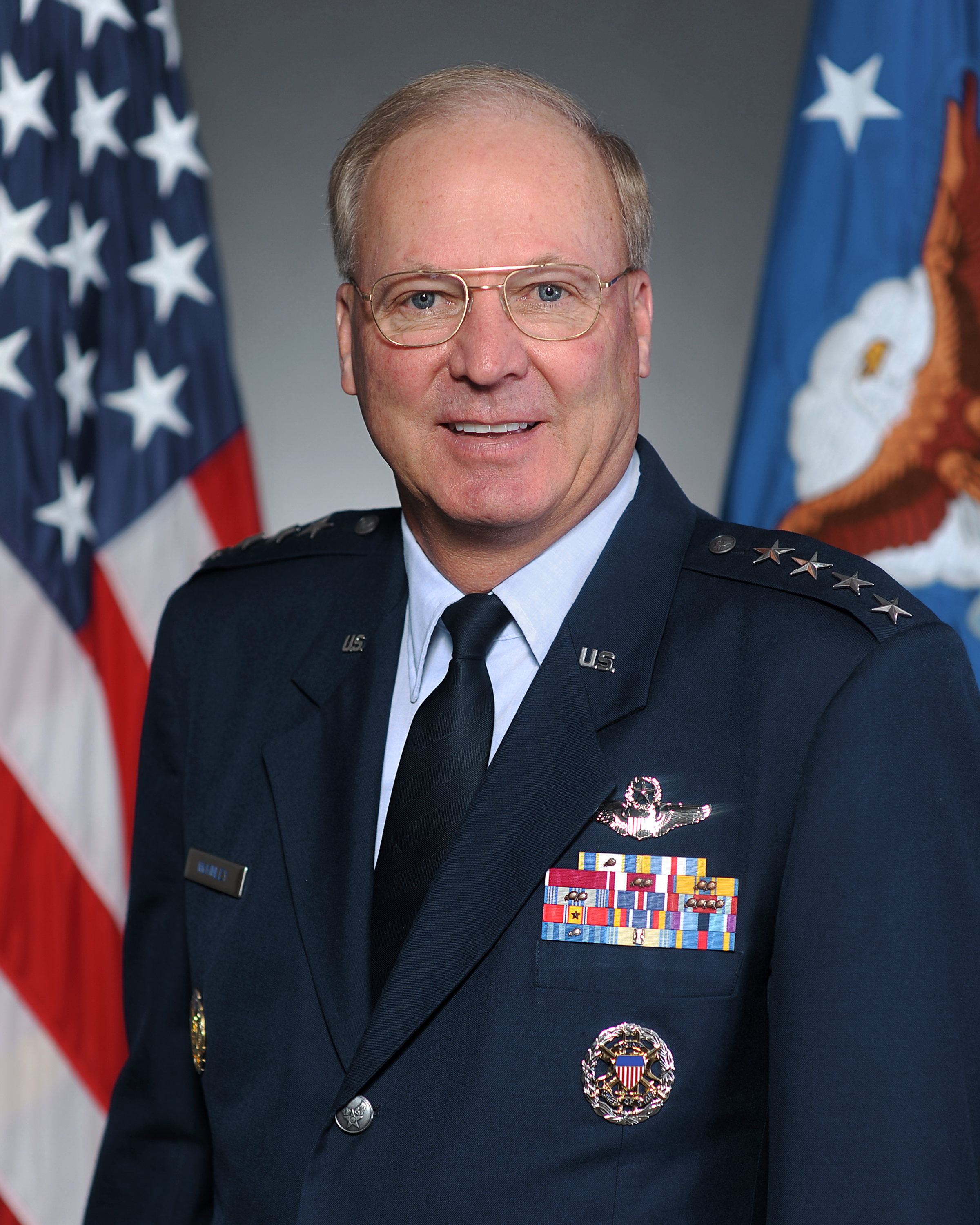
Craig R. McKinley, first four-star general in the National Guard.

The shift from conscription to an all-volunteer force after the Vietnam War made the six reserve components (Army and Air National Guards; Army, Air Force, Naval, and Marine Corps Reserves) the main source of expansion for the military during an emergency. Bills were introduced in the House as early as 1969 to increase the statutory two-star grade of the chief of the National Guard Bureau (CNGB), which traced to a World War I law that gave all Army bureau chiefs the rank of major general. The Defense Department opposed any legislative increase in the CNGB's grade, but designated it a three-star position administratively in 1979. By 1996, CNGB Edward D. Baca was asking Congress for a third star for the directors of the Army and Air National Guards and a fourth star for his successor as CNGB, to better participate in top-level Defense Department decisions.

Bitter debates over troop cuts after the Cold War sparked demands for National Guard membership on the Joint Chiefs of Staff (JCS) and higher grades for the reserve component chiefs. Public infighting between active and reserve components over the 1997 Quadrennial Defense Review led the Senate to amend the annual defense authorization bill to establish a four-star senior representative of the National Guard Bureau, a separate position from the CNGB that would alternate between Army and Air National Guard officers and carry full membership on the JCS for a four-year term. The final bill negotiated with the House reduced the four-star senior representative to a pair of two-star assistants to the chairman of the JCS for National Guard matters (ACJCS/NGM) and Reserve matters (ACJCS/RM). A National Guard Association of the United States official vowed to keep lobbying for full JCS membership, saying, "We are of the view that two plus two don't equal four."

After the September 11 attacks in 2001, the National Guard and Reserves completed their post-Cold War transformation from a rarely mobilized strategic reserve to an operational force in continual use at home and abroad. CNGB H Steven Blum and the state adjutants general renewed pressure for a National Guard seat on the JCS, leading the House to introduce a bill to make the CNGB a four-star member of the JCS in 2006. Supporters in the Senate observed that the National Guard comprised over 30 percent of the total force but only 3 percent of three-star generals and 0 percent of four-star generals. Strong pushback from the Defense Department led Congress to refer the bill to an independent commission, which endorsed a fourth star for the CNGB but said the CNGB was not equivalent to a service chief and should not be added to the JCS because treating the National Guard like a separate service would undo decades of integration with the Army and Air Force. The National Guard Empowerment Act of 2007 (enacted as part of the National Defense Authorization Act for Fiscal Year 2008) gave the CNGB a fourth star but no JCS seat, making Air National Guard director Craig R. McKinley the first four-star National Guard officer when he succeeded Blum as CNGB in November 2008. The chairman of the JCS invited the CNGB to attend its meetings along with the commandant of the Coast Guard, much as the commandant of the Marine Corps had attended by invitation from 1952 until being elevated to full member in 1978.

In May 2011, a bill was introduced in the Senate to make the CNGB a full member of the JCS. CNGB McKinley testified in favor of the bill, saying it would protect his role as advocate of the National Guard's domestic and non-federal missions by entitling the CNGB to attend JCS meetings by law, instead of at the discretion of the current JCS chairman. All six members of the JCS opposed adding the CNGB to their ranks. They saw the Army National Guard and Army Reserve as subordinate units of the Army, and the Air National Guard and Air Force Reserve as likewise inseparable from the Air Force as a service. Adding the CNGB to the JCS would elevate only two of the six reserve components into a de facto fifth service. Proponents of JCS membership viewed the Army and Air National Guards as service components of a joint National Guard Bureau, and noted that the Marine Corps was a full JCS member despite being part of the Navy. The National Defense Authorization Act for Fiscal Year 2012 made the CNGB a statutory member of the JCS on December 31, 2011.

==== Vice commandant of the Coast Guard ====
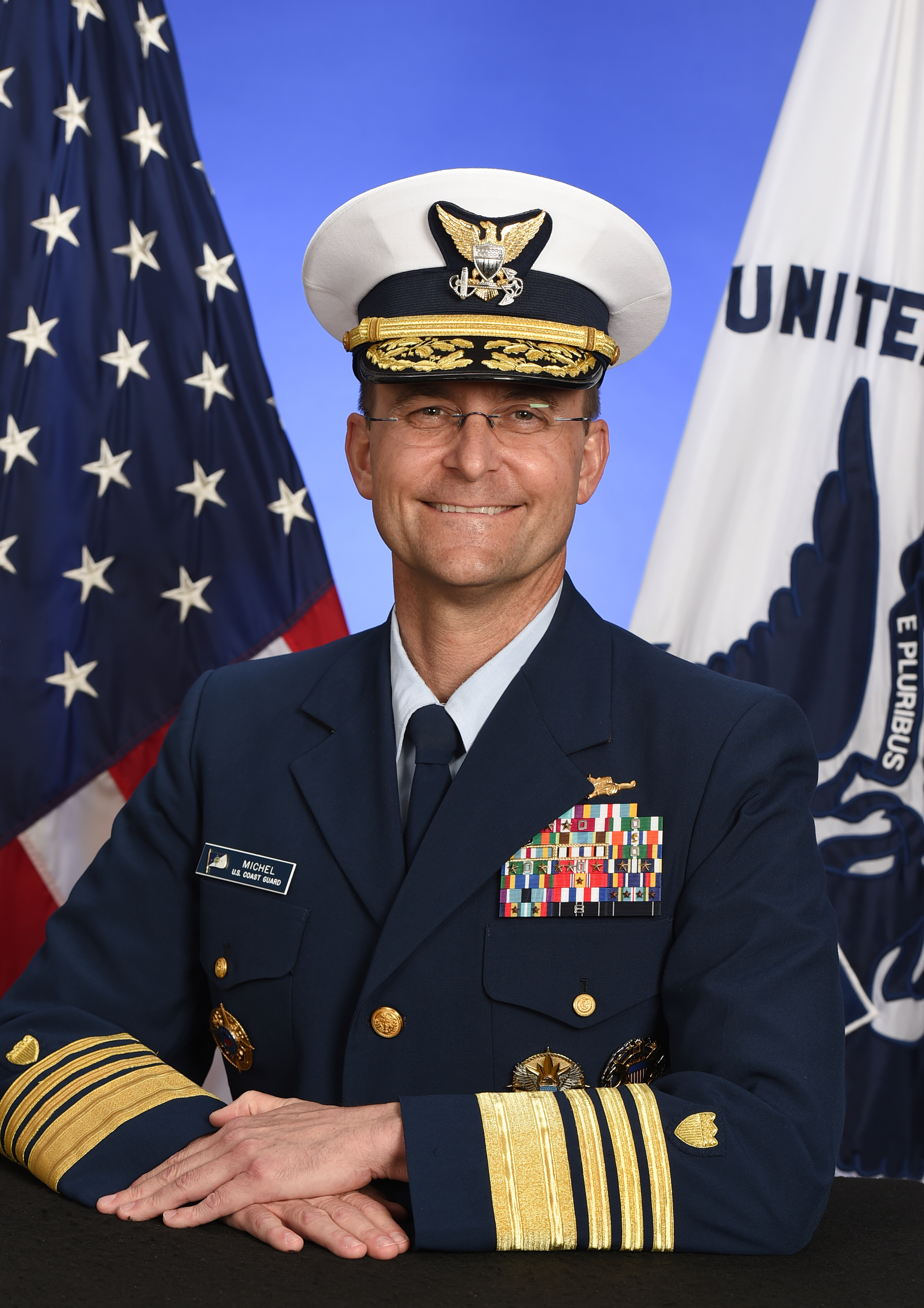
Charles D. Michel, first four-star vice commandant of the Coast Guard.

In March 2007, Coast Guard commandant Thad Allen submitted a modernization proposal to Congress with provisions to raise the three-star vice commandant of the Coast Guard to the same four-star grade as other service vice chiefs, and to replace the three statutory three-star positions with up to four vice admirals who could be assigned anywhere. The House passed a bill authorizing a fourth star for the vice commandant and a fourth vice admiral, as requested, but removed the desired assignment flexibility by specifying the four new three-star positions by name. This change and other controversial provisions caused Allen to repudiate the House bill, which never passed the Senate. The next Congress passed the bill after substituting the Coast Guard's preferred three-star wording, but deleted the fourth star for the vice commandant. The vice commandant was finally raised to the grade of admiral in 2016.

==== Director of naval nuclear propulsion ====
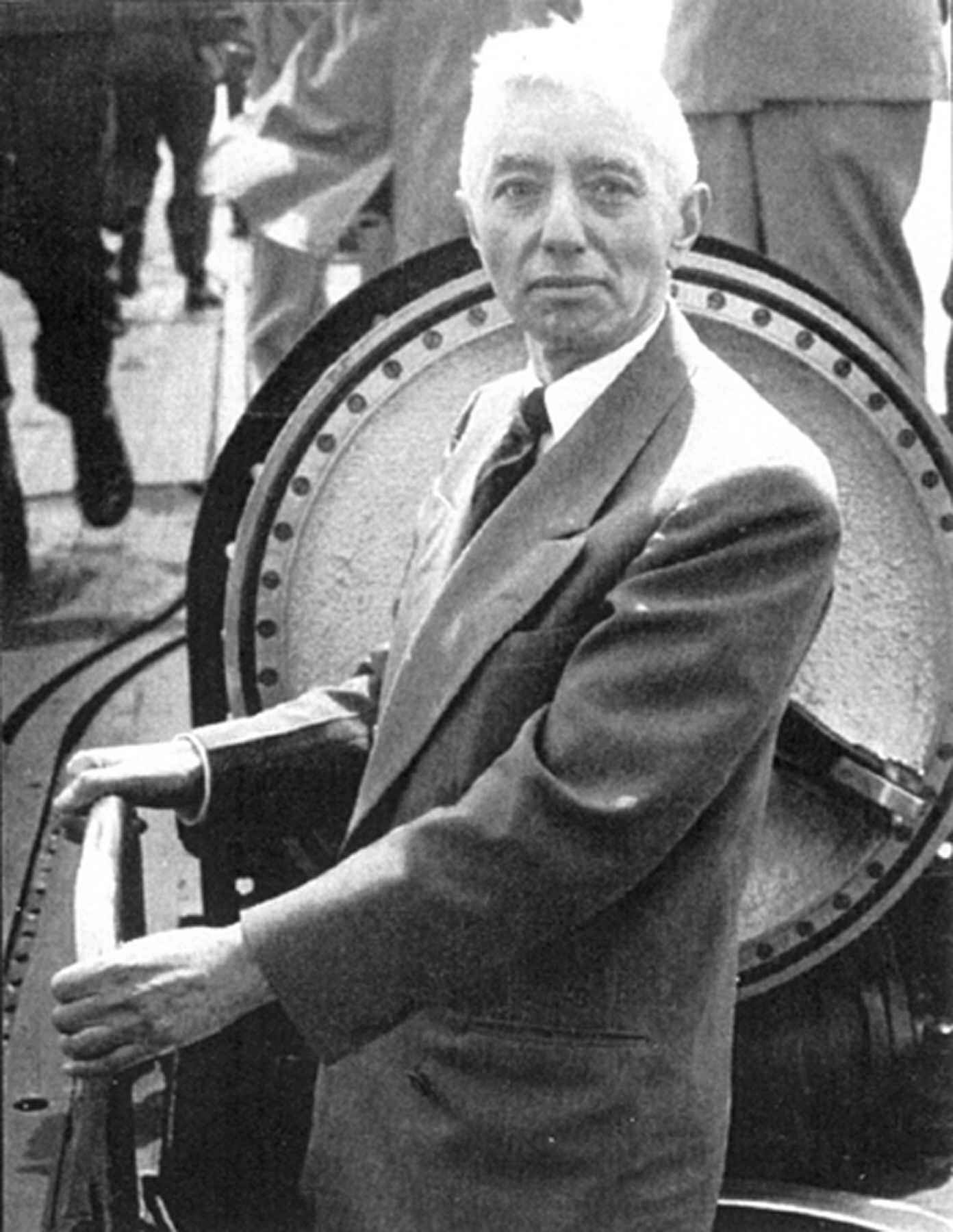
Retired admiral Hyman G. Rickover was extended on active duty from 1964 until 1982.

In November 1981, Navy secretary John Lehman orchestrated the relief of legendary four-star admiral Hyman G. Rickover as director of the naval nuclear propulsion program, which Rickover had led since its inception in 1949. Rickover had transferred to the retired list upon reaching mandatory retirement age in 1964, but was retained on active duty by successive administrations that renewed his tenure in two-year increments until his final two-year extension expired on January 31, 1982.

After a disastrous Oval Office exit interview in which Rickover denounced Lehman and defense secretary Caspar Weinberger to the president, Lehman authorized Rickover a small transition office for a few months, the same courtesy afforded all retiring four-star admirals, plus a car, driver, and secretary, which could be extended, six months at a time, for as long as Rickover behaved. "In other words," Rickover told the Joint Economic Committee in his final appearance before Congress, "he wanted me completely terminated in the Navy within 3 to 6 months." Instead, with what Lehman called "the classic Rickover touch", he was guaranteed an office and staff for life by the powerful Senate Appropriations Committee, which attached a report to a supplemental appropriations bill stating, "The Committee will expect the Secretary of the Navy" to provide Rickover with "adequate office space, administrative support, and transportation...for an indefinite period and on an unconditional basis."

Rickover's unique office was institutionalized for his successors by a charter that his designated relief, Vice Admiral Kinnaird R. McKee, helped write. The naval nuclear propulsion program integrated units of the Departments of Energy and of the Navy under a single director, who could either be a civilian or an active or retired Navy officer with the grade of admiral. The term of the director was eight years, and could be lengthened or shortened by mutual consent of the energy and Navy secretaries. The Senate Armed Services Committee tried to slip the charter quietly into law by attaching it to an unrelated bill to repatriate German war art confiscated by the Army after World War II, but the defense and nuclear shipbuilding industries lobbied furiously against making Rickover's existing organization permanent. Instead, the charter was issued as an executive order on February 1, 1982, the day McKee took over from Rickover, and enacted into law by the annual defense authorization act for 1985.

The director's statutory eight-year term was the longest of any four-star officer by far, so in 2004 defense secretary Donald Rumsfeld looked into downgrading the position to three stars and shortening its term. The Navy warned that reducing the director's rank would be blamed for any subsequent nuclear safety problems, but agreed that the term should be changed to a more standard four years, which could be extended to eight years in one- or two-year increments. The necessary legislative changes were to be submitted for the 2006 defense authorization act, which did not include them.

==== Service academy superintendents ====
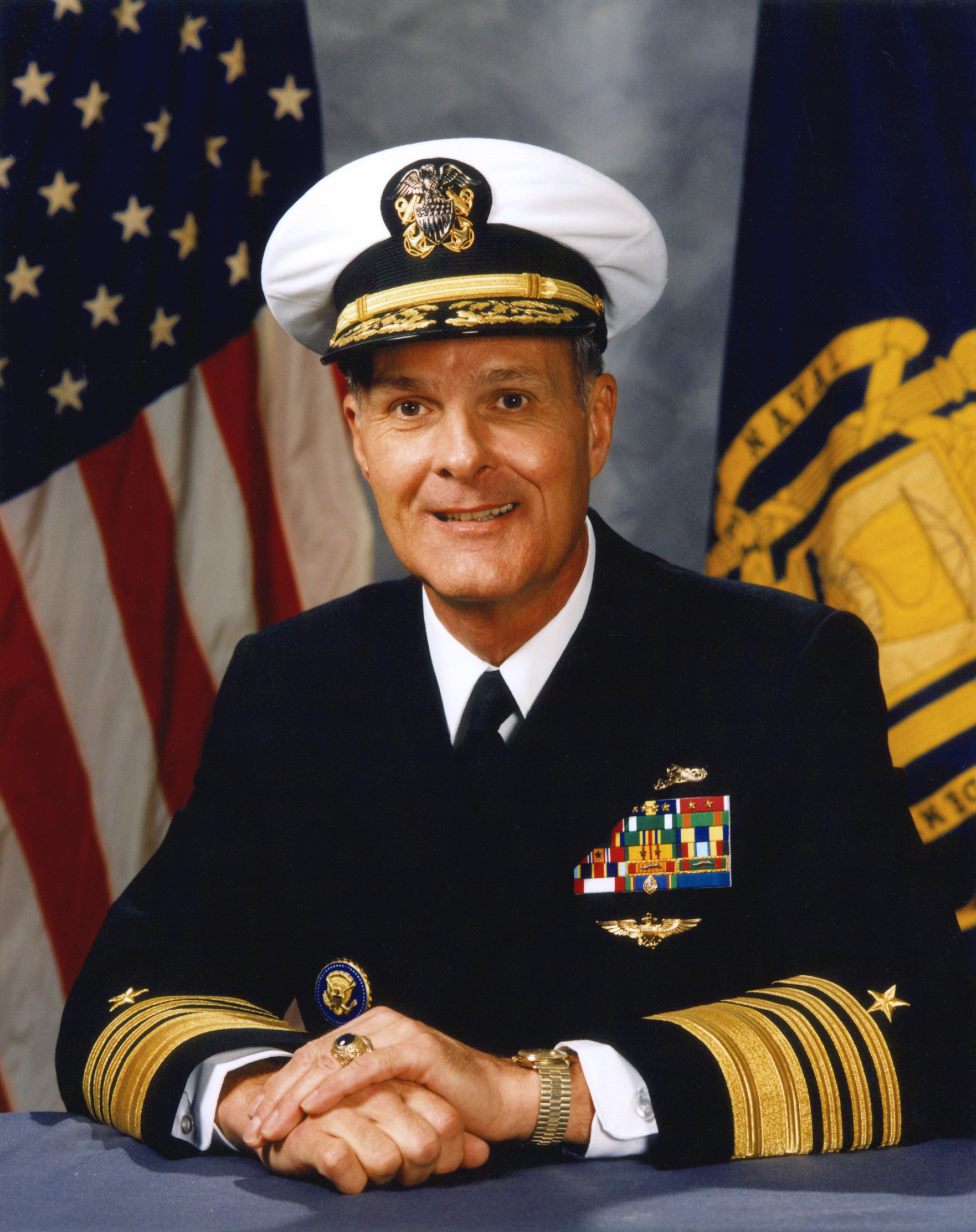
Charles R. Larson, four-star superintendent of the U.S. Naval Academy.

In 1977, faced with the worst cheating scandal in the history of the United States Military Academy, the Army broke with tradition by appointing a respected retired officer as its superintendent. Retired four-star general Andrew Goodpaster was recalled to active duty as a lieutenant general, the standard rank of the superintendent, having declined an offer by Army chief of staff Bernard W. Rogers to ask Congress to approve his recall as a four-star general to serve in a three-star position, a precedent Goodpaster did not want to set. Goodpaster reverted to his four-star retired grade upon leaving active duty again in 1981.

In 1994, a cheating scandal at the United States Naval Academy led the Navy to appoint a newly retired four-star officer for a four-year term as superintendent, instead of the traditional two-star officer serving a three-year term. The four-star commander in chief of U.S. Pacific Command (and former two-star Naval Academy superintendent), Charles R. Larson, retired as previously planned, but was immediately recalled to active duty and appointed four-star Naval Academy superintendent, a position that Congress exempted from the four-star caps for the duration of his tour.

Service academy superintendents were exempted from the caps on three-star officers in 1999. In return, Congress required them to acknowledge in writing that they would be retired at the end of their term. In 2004, Congress authorized the secretary of defense to waive this requirement, allowing West Point superintendent Darryl A. Williams to be promoted to four-star commanding general of U.S. Army Europe and Africa in 2022.

==== Assistant secretary for health ====
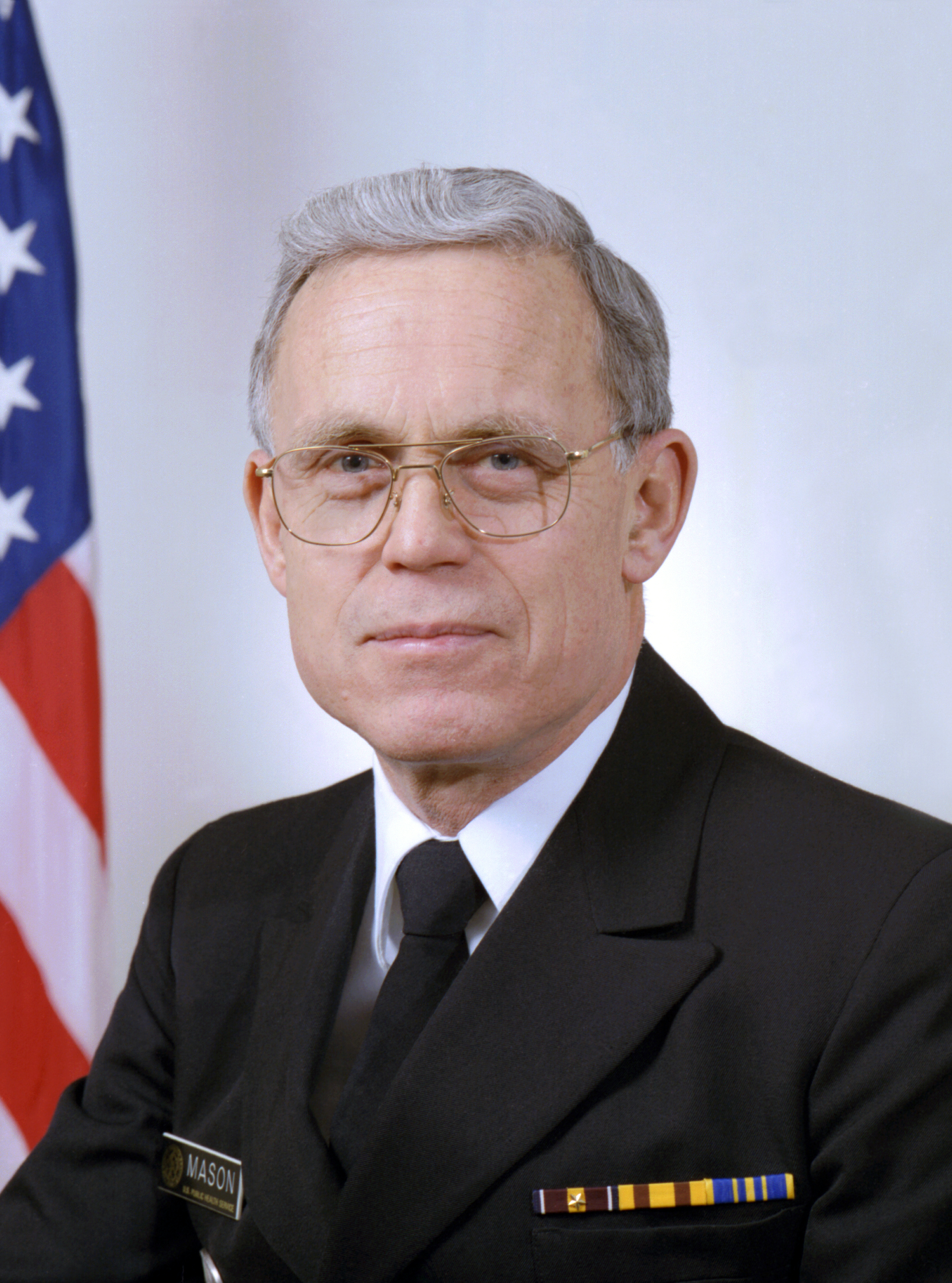
James O. Mason, first four-star assistant secretary for health.

The U.S. Public Health Service Commissioned Corps had its own set of grades that were derived from the pre-1947 grades of the Navy Medical Corps, but used the equivalent modern naval ranks except in legal documents. For example, the O-9 grade—created in the Public Health Service in 1979 to give the surgeon general of the United States the same three-star grade as the surgeon general of the Army—was typically called a vice admiral in the Public Health Service. The Commissioned Corps was headed by the surgeon general of the United States until a 1968 reorganization gave the administration tighter control over the Public Health Service by subordinating the uniformed surgeon general to a civilian political appointee, the assistant secretary for health.

Congress created the O-10 grade in the Public Health Service in 1990, to be held whenever a Commissioned Corps officer served as assistant secretary for health. This resolved an anomalous rank inversion created by the 1989 appointment of a two-star Commissioned Corps admiral, James O. Mason, as assistant secretary for health to supervise the three-star surgeon general, C. Everett Koop. Mason became the first four-star admiral in the Public Health Service Commissioned Corps on December 13, 1990. In 1998, David Satcher was appointed both assistant secretary for health and surgeon general, serving as a four-star admiral until 2001, when a change of administration caused him to resign as assistant secretary of health, a political office, and revert to the statutory three-star grade of the surgeon general for the rest of his four-year term.

Although the law required the surgeon general to be selected from career commissioned officers in the Public Health Service, most surgeons general after 1977, when Julius B. Richmond was appointed both assistant secretary for health and surgeon general, were civilians whose selection was made legal by commissioning them directly to the grade of medical director in the regular Commissioned Corps, its highest permanent grade, with the rank of vice admiral while serving as surgeon general. The assistant secretary of health was authorized but not required to be a commissioned officer, and was either appointed as a civilian or commissioned as a four-star admiral, at the option of the president and of the appointee.

The practice of commissioning civilians as three- or four-star admirals in the Department of Health and Human Services was sometimes derided as creating "instant admirals" or "pretend admirals". The position corresponding to assistant secretary for health in the Department of Defense, with oversight over the military surgeon generals, was the assistant secretary of defense for health affairs, a non-uniformed civilian with the precedence but not the commission of a four-star officer.

== Legislation ==
Legislation	Citation	Summary	Service
Act of December 12, 1980 [Defense Officer Personnel Management Act]	94 Stat. 2844; 94 Stat. 2849; 94 Stat. 2863; 94 Stat. 2864; 94 Stat. 2868; 94 Stat. 2875; 94 Stat. 2876	Authorized president to designate positions of importance and responsibility to carry the grade of general or admiral, to be assigned from officers on active duty in any grade above colonel or captain, subject to Senate confirmation, who revert to their permanent grade at the end of their assignment unless it was terminated by; 1. assignment to another position designated to carry the same grade, 2. up to 180 days of hospitalization, or; 3. up to 90 days prior to retirement.; Capped, except during war or national emergency: 1. Army and Air Force officers in grades above major general at 15 percent of all general officers on active duty, of whom not more than 25 percent to serve in the grade of general; 2. Navy officers in grades above rear admiral at 15 percent of all flag officers on active duty, of whom not more than 25 percent to serve in the grade of admiral; and; 3. Marine Corps officers in grades above major general at 15 percent of all general officers on active duty.; Exempted from caps the: 1. chairman of the Joint Chiefs of Staff, and; 2. chief of staff to the president.; Set mandatory retirement at; 1. 5 years in the regular grade of major general or rear admiral or 35 years of active commissioned service, whichever is later; or; 2. age 62 for all regular commissioned officers except certain service academy staff and commissioned warrant officers.; Authorized president to defer the retirement of officers serving in grades above major general or rear admiral; 1. for up to 5 years beyond maximum time in grade or years of service, but not past age 62; or; 2. until age 64, with at most 10 such deferments at any time.; Authorized three- and four-star officers to retire in the highest grade held on active duty, at the discretion of the president and subject to confirmation by the Senate, with no time-in-grade requirement.; Authorized service secretaries to recall up to 15 retired general or flag officers in each service to active duty for longer than 60 days.	USA, USN, USAF, USMC
Act of September 24, 1983 [Department of Defense Authorization Act, 1984]	97 Stat. 654	Authorized one additional Air Force general during FY 1984 [renewed in FY 1985 (98 Stat. 2521), FY 1986 (99 Stat. 630), and FY 1987 (100 Stat. 3869)] (FY 1984–1986: Andrew P. Iosue; FY 1987 intended for James A. Abrahamson).	USAF
Act of October 19, 1984 [Department of Defense Authorization Act, 1985]	98 Stat. 2649	Incorporated Executive Order 12344 (February 1, 1982), specifying grade of admiral for director of Naval Nuclear Propulsion Program.	USN
Act of November 8, 1985 [Department of Defense Authorization Act, 1986]	99 Stat. 630	Required retired three- and four-star officers to be recalled to active duty in the highest permanent grade held while on the active list (i.e. two-star grade).; Authorized one additional Marine Corps general during FY 1986 [renewed in FY 1987 (100 Stat. 3869)], but only if commander in chief of U.S. Central Command (George B. Crist).	USA, USN, USAF, USMC
Act of October 1, 1986 [Goldwater-Nichols Department of Defense Reorganization Act of 1986]	100 Stat. 1006; 100 Stat. 1008; 100 Stat. 1010; 100 Stat. 1018; 100 Stat. 1041; 100 Stat. 1051; 100 Stat. 1054; 100 Stat. 1062	Established vice chairman of the Joint Chiefs of Staff, who may not be from the same service as the chairman, and may not vote in meetings of the Joint Chiefs of Staff unless acting as chairman [elevated to voting member in 1992 (106 Stat. 2473)].; Exempted from caps the vice chairman of the Joint Chiefs of Staff.; Specified grade of general or admiral for: 1. chairman of the Joint Chiefs of Staff, who outranks all other officers but may not exercise military command.; 2. vice chairman of the Joint Chiefs of Staff, who outranks all other officers except the chairman of the Joint Chiefs of Staff, but may not exercise military command.; 3. vice chiefs of staff of the Army and Air Force, vice chief of naval operations, and assistant commandant of the Marine Corps.; Set terms of two years, with reappointments limited to two additional terms except in time of war, for: 1. chairman of the Joint Chiefs of Staff, whose term begins on October 1 of odd-numbered years.; 2. vice chairman of the Joint Chiefs of Staff.; Limited officers to at most six years of combined service as chairman or vice chairman of the Joint Chiefs of Staff, or eight years if extended by the president, except in time of war.; Required selection, unless waived by the president, of: 1. chairman of the Joint Chiefs of Staff from the vice chairman, service chiefs, or combatant commanders.; 2. vice chairman of the Joint Chiefs of Staff from general and flag officers with joint duty experience.; Repealed prohibition on unified transportation command [prohibited in 1982 (96 Stat. 747)].	USA, USN, USAF, USMC
Act of October 18, 1986; Act of October 30, 1986	100 Stat. 1783-123; 100 Stat. 3341-123	Established unified combatant command for special operations forces, whose commander has the grade of general or admiral.	USA, USN, USAF, USMC
Act of December 4, 1987 [National Defense Authorization Act for Fiscal Years 1988 and 1989]	101 Stat. 1088	Authorized additional appointments to general or admiral in one service if offset by corresponding reductions in other services, up to 15 percent of the total number of officers serving in those grades in all services.	USA, USN, USAF, USMC
Act of September 29, 1988 [National Defense Authorization Act for Fiscal Year 1989]	102 Stat. 1996	Authorized president to defer until October 1, 1989, the retirement of the officer serving as chairman of the Joint Chiefs of Staff for the term which began on October 1, 1987, beyond the maximum deferred retirement age of 64 (William J. Crowe Jr.).	USN
Act of October 24, 1988 [Defense Authorization Amendments and Base Closure and Realignment Act]	102 Stat. 2625	Authorized president to extend until June 1, 1989, the term of the officer serving as vice chairman of the Joint Chiefs of Staff for the term which began on February 6, 1987 (Robert T. Herres).	USAF
Act of June 30, 1989	103 Stat. 134	Authorized James B. Busey IV to be appointed Administrator of the Federal Aviation Agency as a retired Navy officer instead of as a civilian.	USN
Act of November 3, 1990	104 Stat. 1289	Specified that a commissioned officer of the Public Health Service holds the grade corresponding to general in the Army while serving as Assistant Secretary for Health.; Assigned pay grade O-10 to Assistant Secretary for Health.	USPHSCC
Act of November 5, 1990 [National Defense Authorization Act for Fiscal Year 1991]	104 Stat. 1545	Reduced number of general or flag officers during the period from September 30, 1991, to October 1, 1995; and after October 1, 1995, to: 1. 386 and 302 in the Army, 2. 250 and 216 in the Navy, 3. 326 and 279 in the Air Force, and; 4. 68 and 61 in the Marine Corps.	USA, USN, USAF, USMC
Act of December 5, 1991 [National Defense Authorization Act for Fiscal Years 1992 and 1993]	105 Stat. 1354	Reduced time a general or admiral can remain in grade pending retirement from 90 days to 60 days.	USA, USN, USAF, USMC
Act of June 2, 1992	106 Stat. 216	Authorized officer who began serving as deputy national security adviser on December 5, 1991, to remain in the grade of admiral pending retirement until June 4, 1992, exceeding the 60 day limit and retroactive to December 5, 1991 (Jonathan T. Howe).	USN
Act of June 26, 1992	106 Stat. 273	Authorized Thomas C. Richards to be appointed Administrator of the Federal Aviation Agency as a retired Air Force officer instead of as a civilian.	USAF
Act of October 23, 1992 [National Defense Authorization Act for Fiscal Year 1993]	106 Stat. 2473	Elevated vice chairman to voting member of Joint Chiefs of Staff.	USA, USN, USAF, USMC
Act of October 5, 1994 [National Defense Authorization Act for Fiscal Year 1995]	108 Stat. 2744; 108 Stat. 2826	Exempted from caps until September 30, 1997 [extended in 1996 to September 30, 2000 (110 Stat. 2506), in 1999 to September 30, 2003 (113 Stat. 592), in 2002 to December 31, 2004 (116 Stat. 2526); and made permanent in 2003 (117 Stat. 1456)], the following joint four-star positions, but only if the service secretaries nominated at least one officer from the Army, Navy, Marine Corps, and Air Force to fill them: 1. commander of a combatant command or U.S. Forces Korea, and; 2. deputy commander of U.S. European Command, but only if the commander is also the Supreme Allied Commander, Europe [repealed in 2016 (130 Stat. 2102)].; Authorized chairman of the Joint Chiefs of Staff to submit additional nominees for joint four-star positions.; Exempted from caps the officer serving as superintendent of the U.S. Naval Academy on October 5, 1994 (Charles R. Larson).; Capped officers in the grade of general or admiral in all services to a total of 32 after September 30, 1995, except positions specifically exempted by law [repealed in 2001 (115 Stat. 1079)].; Established vice chief of the National Guard Bureau with grade of major general, who may not be from the same service as the chief of the National Guard Bureau.	USA, USN, USAF, USMC, NGB
Act of February 10, 1996 [National Defense Authorization Act for Fiscal Year 1996]	110 Stat. 286; 110 Stat. 292	Exempted from caps officers continuing to hold the grade of general or admiral pending retirement after relief as chairman of the Joint Chiefs of Staff or service chief.; Repealed requirement that retirement in three- or four-star grades be confirmed by the Senate.; Required secretary of defense to certify in writing to the president and Congress that an officer served on active duty satisfactorily in the grade of general or admiral before that officer can retire in that grade.; Required at least three years on active duty in three- or four-star grades to be eligible to voluntarily retire in those grades, which the president could waive for extreme hardship or exceptional circumstances but not if the officer was under investigation for misconduct.	USA, USN, USAF, USMC
Act of November 18, 1997 [National Defense Authorization Act for Fiscal Year 1998]	111 Stat. 1726	Increased years of active commissioned service before mandatory retirement to 38 years for lieutenant generals and vice admirals, and 40 years for generals and admirals.	USA, USN, USAF, USMC
Act of October 17, 1998 [Strom Thurmond National Defense Authorization Act for Fiscal Year 1999]	112 Stat. 2035	Authorized promotion of Benjamin O. Davis Jr. to general on the retired list, with no increase in compensation or benefits.	USAF
Act of October 5, 1999 [National Defense Authorization Act for Fiscal Year 2000]	113 Stat. 602; 113 Stat. 648; 113 Stat. 664	Exempted service academy superintendents from three-star caps, but required them to retire at the end of their terms.; Increased basic pay cap for general and flag officers from Level V to Level III of the Executive Schedule.; Repealed reduction in military retired pay while serving in civilian offices.	USA, USN, USAF, USMC
Act of October 30, 2000 [Floyd D. Spence National Defense Authorization Act for Fiscal Year 2001]	114 Stat. 1654A-102; 114 Stat. 1654A-105; 114 Stat. 1654A-122	Specified grade of lieutenant general or vice admiral for directors of Army and Air National Guards; chiefs of Army, Naval, and Air Force Reserves; and commander of Marine Forces Reserve.; Increased percentage caps [replaced with fixed caps in 2009 (123 Stat. 2273)] on officers in grades above major general or rear admiral from 15 percent of all general or flag officers on active duty in each service to: 1. 15.7 percent for the Army, Air Force, and Navy [increased to 16.3 percent in 2008 for judge advocates general of the Army, Air Force, and Navy (122 Stat. 114) and 16.4 percent in 2008 (122 Stat. 4433)]; and; 2. 16.2 percent for the Marine Corps [increased to 17.5 percent in 2002 (116 Stat. 2525) and 19 percent in 2008 (122 Stat. 4433)].; Requested the president advance Husband E. Kimmel to the grade of admiral on the retired list.	USA, USN, USAF, USMC
Act of December 28, 2001 [National Defense Authorization Act for Fiscal Year 2002]	115 Stat. 1080	Authorized secretary of defense to delegate certification of satisfactory service in three- and four-star grades to the under secretary or deputy under secretary of defense for personnel and readiness.	USA, USN, USAF, USMC
Act of December 2, 2002 [Bob Stump National Defense Authorization Act for Fiscal Year 2003]	116 Stat. 2533; 116 Stat. 2534	Authorized secretary of defense to delegate certification of satisfactory service in three- and four-star grades to any Senate-confirmed civilian official in the Office of the Secretary of Defense.; Required advance written notice to House and Senate Armed Services Committees for any waiver of the three-year time-in-grade requirement for a general or flag officer to retire in grade.	USA, USN, USAF, USMC
Act of November 24, 2003 [National Defense Authorization Act for Fiscal Year 2004]	117 Stat. 1456; 117 Stat. 1458	Required chief of naval operations and commandant of the Marine Corps to be selected from general and flag officers of their respective services, the same as the Army and Air Force.; Authorized officer serving as chief of naval operations on October 1, 2003, to be reappointed for a term not longer than 2 years (Vernon E. Clark).	USN, USMC
Act of October 8, 2004 [Ronald W. Reagan National Defense Authorization Act for Fiscal Year 2005]	118 Stat. 1876; 118 Stat. 1902	Authorized secretary of defense to waive requirement that service academy superintendents retire at the end of their terms (Darryl A. Williams).; Redesignated vice chief of the National Guard Bureau as director of the Joint Staff of the National Guard Bureau.	USA, USN, USAF, NGB
Act of December 17, 2004 [Intelligence Reform and Terrorism Prevention Act of 2004]	118 Stat. 3656	Established director and principal deputy director of national intelligence, at most one of whom can be an active-duty officer.; Exempted from caps the director and principal deputy director of national intelligence (Michael V. Hayden).	USAF
Act of January 6, 2006 [National Defense Authorization Act for Fiscal Year 2006]	119 Stat. 3229	Exempted from caps either the director or deputy director of the Central Intelligence Agency (Michael V. Hayden).	USAF
Act of October 17, 2006 [John Warner National Defense Authorization Act for Fiscal Year 2007]	120 Stat. 2176; 120 Stat. 2245; 120 Stat. 2258	Increased mandatory retirement age for general and flag officers from 62 to 64.; Authorized officers in grades above major general or rear admiral to defer retirement until age 66 if authorized by secretary of defense, or age 68 if authorized by president.; Increased basic pay cap for general and flag officers from Level III to Level II of the Executive Schedule.; Increased maximum retired pay from 75 percent of capped basic pay, to 75 percent of uncapped basic pay plus 2.5 percent per year in excess of 30 years of service.	USA, USN, USAF, USMC
Act of January 28, 2008 [National Defense Authorization Act for Fiscal Year 2008]	122 Stat. 94; 122 Stat. 273	Authorized officers relieved of a position designated to carry the grade of general or admiral to continue to hold that grade for up to 60 days while awaiting orders.; Reduced time after serving on active duty for regular commissioned officers to become eligible to be appointed secretary of defense from 10 years to 7 years.	USA, USN, USAF, USMC
Act of January 28, 2008 [National Guard Empowerment Act of 2007]	122 Stat. 496; 122 Stat. 501; 122 Stat. 502	Increased grade of chief of the National Guard Bureau to general.; Set mandatory retirement for reserve officers in grade of general at 5 years in that grade or 40 years of commissioned service, whichever is later.; Required either the commander or deputy commander of U.S. Northern Command to be a National Guard officer [expanded to any reserve component officer in 2016 (130 Stat. 2113)].	NGB
Act of October 28, 2009 [National Defense Authorization Act for Fiscal Year 2010]	123 Stat. 2273; 123 Stat. 2274; 123 Stat. 2276	Capped officers in the grade of general or admiral at 7 Army generals, 6 Navy admirals, 9 Air Force generals, 2 Marine Corps generals, and 20 generals or admirals assigned to joint duty.; Exempted from caps an officer assigned to a temporary joint-duty assignment designated by the secretary of defense, for up to one year.; Exempted from caps the chief of the National Guard Bureau.; Removed exemptions for chairman and vice chairman of the Joint Chiefs of Staff and chief of staff to the president, and charged those positions to the joint-duty pool.; Capped additional appointments in one service that can be offset by corresponding reductions in other services at 5 officers.	USA, USN, USAF, USMC, NGB
Act of December 31, 2011 [National Defense Authorization Act for Fiscal Year 2012]	125 Stat. 1387; 125 Stat. 1391; 125 Stat. 1393	Added chief of the National Guard Bureau to Joint Chiefs of Staff, and reestablished vice chief of the National Guard Bureau with grade of lieutenant general.; Removed exemptions for intelligence positions like the director or deputy director of the Central Intelligence Agency, and for the chief of the National Guard Bureau, and charged those positions to the joint-duty pool.	USA, USN, USAF, USMC, NGB
Act of December 19, 2014 [Carl Levin and Howard P. "Buck" McKeon National Defense Authorization Act for Fiscal Year 2015]	128 Stat. 3401	Decreased maximum retired pay from 75 percent of uncapped basic pay, to 75 percent of capped basic pay, effective December 31, 2014.	USA, USN, USAF, USMC
Act of February 8, 2016 [Coast Guard Authorization Act of 2015]	130 Stat. 33	Increased grade of vice commandant of the Coast Guard to admiral.	USCG
Act of December 23, 2016 [National Defense Authorization Act for Fiscal Year 2017]	130 Stat. 2096; 130 Stat. 2100; 130 Stat. 2102; 130 Stat. 2351; 130 Stat. 2354; 130 Stat. 2357	Effective December 31, 2022: 1. Required 25 percent reduction in number of general and flag officers.; 2. Removed four-star grade cap on joint-duty general and flag officers.; 3. Removed one-year exemption for officer assigned to a temporary joint-duty assignment designated by the secretary of defense.; Increased term of chairman of the Joint Chiefs of Staff from 2 years to 4 years, beginning on October 1 of an odd-numbered year, effective January 1, 2019.; Increased term of vice chairman of the Joint Chiefs of Staff from 2 years to 4 years, beginning on October 1 of an odd-numbered year, where the vice chairman's term does not start in the same year as the chairman's term, effective January 1, 2021.; Specified that vice chairman of the Joint Chiefs of Staff is ineligible for promotion to chairman or any other position in the armed forces.; Repealed authorization for four-star chief of staff to the president.; Established unified combatant command for cyber operations forces, whose commander has the grade of general or admiral.	USA, USN, USAF, USMC

== See also ==
- Legislative history of United States four-star officers
- Legislative history of United States four-star officers until 1865
- Legislative history of United States four-star officers, 1866–1898
- Legislative history of United States four-star officers, 1899–1946
- Legislative history of United States four-star officers, 1947–1979
- Legislative history of United States four-star officers from 2017
