= Andrew P. Iosue =

United States Air Force general (1927–2026)

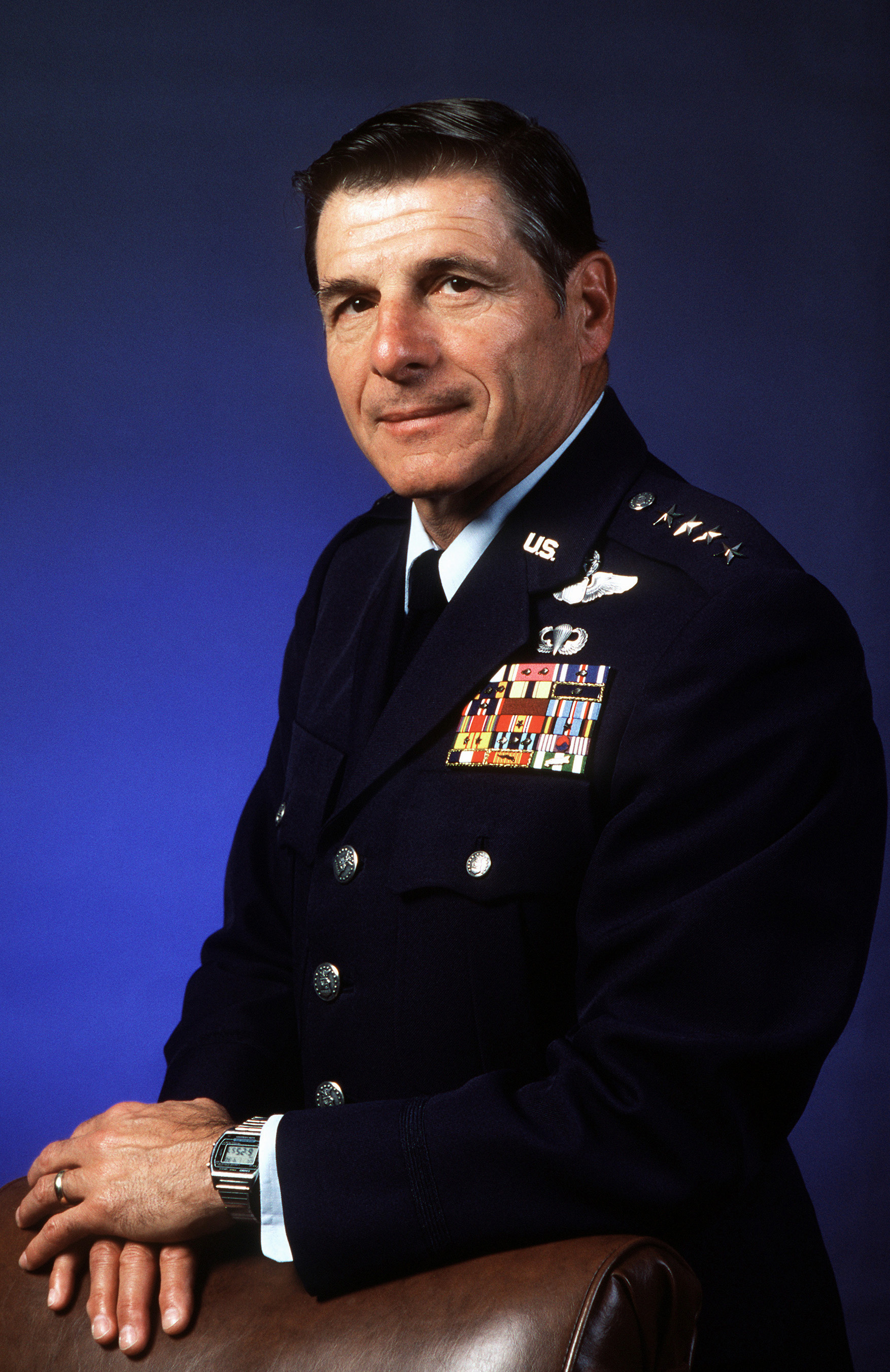
- Iosue in 1986
- Born: November 7, 1927; Somerville, Massachusetts, U.S.
- Died: October 27, 2026 (aged 98)
- Military career
- Allegiance: United States of America
- Branch: United States Air Force
- Service years: 1951–1986
- Rank: General
- Commands: Air Training Command; Air Force Military Training Center; 374th Tactical Airlift Wing
- Conflicts: Vietnam War
- Awards: Legion of Merit (3); Distinguished Flying Cross (2); Air Medal (4)

Andrew Philip Iosue (/ˈɒz.weɪ/ OZ-way; November 7, 1927 – October 27, 2026) was a United States Air Force four-star general who served as Commander, Air Training Command (COMATC) from 1983 to 1986.

== Biography ==
=== Early years ===
Iosue was born in Somerville, Massachusetts, on November 7, 1927. He graduated from Everett High School (Everett, Massachusetts) in 1945 and then attended the University of Massachusetts Amherst where he received a Bachelor of Science Degree in Bacteriology in 1951; and a master's degree from Cornell University. He held honorary doctoral degrees from the University of Massachusetts, University of Rochester and Embry–Riddle Aeronautical Aeronautical University. He entered active duty in July 1951 as a medical service officer with primary duty as a Bacteriologist at Westover Air Force Base, Massachusetts. Iosue next entered flight training. He received his pilot wings in March 1954 at Reese Air Force Base, Texas, and completed training at Mather Air Force Base, California, in September 1954. He then was assigned to the 36th Rescue Flight Air Rescue Squadron at Johnson Air Base, Japan.

From July 1957 to August 1960, he was an Air Force Reserve Officer Training Corps instructor at Cornell University. He subsequently returned to operational duties with the 354th Tactical Fighter Wing at Myrtle Beach Air Force Base, South Carolina. In June 1963 Iosue received his initial assignment in tactical airlift, when he joined the 317th Troop Carrier Wing at Évreux Air Base, France, flying C-130 Hercules. He moved with the wing in 1964 to Lockbourne Air Force Base, Ohio, where he remained until July 1966 as a C-130 instructor pilot and chief of wing training. Iosue then spent four years as chief of the Rated Officer Assignments Section for the Air Force Military Personnel Center at Randolph Air Force Base.

=== Vietnam ===
In July 1970 he went to the Republic of Vietnam (South Vietnam) and commanded the 504th Tactical Air Support Group at Cam Ranh Bay Air Base. The unit was responsible for the forward air controllers in Southeast Asia. In May 1971 he went to the Republic of China (Taiwan) and became commander of the 374th Tactical Airlift Wing at Ching Chuan Kang Air Base, Taiwan. Highlights of this assignment included developing and implementing a C-130 low-level drop system in support of operations at An Lộc, Republic of Vietnam, in May 1972; flying more than 200 combat missions while in Southeast Asia; and in January 1973, in support of the release of American prisoners of war, flying the first U.S. Air Force aircraft to land at Gia Lam Airbase in Hanoi, in 19 years.

=== Later career ===
From June 1973 to July 1975, Iosue was assigned as deputy director of personnel programs, Office of the Deputy Chief of Staff, Personnel, Headquarters U.S. Air Force, Washington, D.C. He later became director. He was then named commander of the U.S. Air Force Recruiting Service and deputy chief of staff, recruiting for Air Training Command at Randolph Air Force Base.

Iosue took command of the Air Force Military Training Center, Lackland Air Force Base, Texas, in September 1976. In March 1979, his assigned driver chased Ed Roney, an airman who was in basic training at the time after Roney failed to salute the general's staff car as it passed. Roney made his way back to his BMTS. When Roney graduated from BMTS a couple of weeks later, he sent the general two Domino's pizzas. In April 1979 he returned to Air Force headquarters as deputy chief of staff for manpower and personnel. He took command of Air Training command in 1983, and retired from the Air Force on September 1, 1986. Iosue, a widower, married Shirley Case, an Air force widow, in October 2011.

=== Retirement and death ===
Following retirement from the Air Force in 1986, Iosue resided in San Antonio, Texas. He served as a Director of Kelly Field National Bank and Director of Government Personnel Mutual Life Insurance Company. Iosue served as President of the San Antonio Golf Association and Vice President of the Rotary Club of San Antonio. He served on the Executive Boards of Alamo Area Boy Scouts, The United Way, World Affairs Council and C.A.M.P. (Children 's Association for Maximum Potential). He was also on the Development Board of the University of Massachusetts and Incarnate Word University and past President of Ratama Race Track.

Iosue later owned a summer home in Crosslake, Minnesota. He died on October 27, 2026, at the age of 98.

== Awards and decorations ==

US Air Force Command Pilot Badge
U.S Army Basic Parachutist Badge
Air Force Distinguished Service Medal	Legion of Merit with two bronze oak leaf clusters	Distinguished Flying Cross with bronze oak leaf cluster
Air Medal with three bronze oak leaf clusters	Air Force Commendation Medal	Air Force Presidential Unit Citation with bronze oak leaf cluster
Air Force Outstanding Unit Award with bronze oak leaf cluster	Navy Good Conduct Medal	American Campaign Medal
World War II Victory Medal	National Defense Service Medal with bronze service star	Armed Forces Expeditionary Medal with bronze service star
Vietnam Service Medal with two bronze service stars	Air and Space Longevity Service Award with three oak leaf clusters	South Korean Order of National Security Merit 3rd class (Cheon-Su)
Philippine Presidential Unit Citation	Vietnam Gallantry Cross with frame and palm	Vietnam Campaign Medal

Iosue received an honorary doctor of aeronautics degree from Embry–Riddle Aeronautical University in Prescott, Arizona, in December 1983 and an honorary doctor of laws degree from the University of Akron in May 1985.
