= Legislative history of United States four-star officers from 2017 =

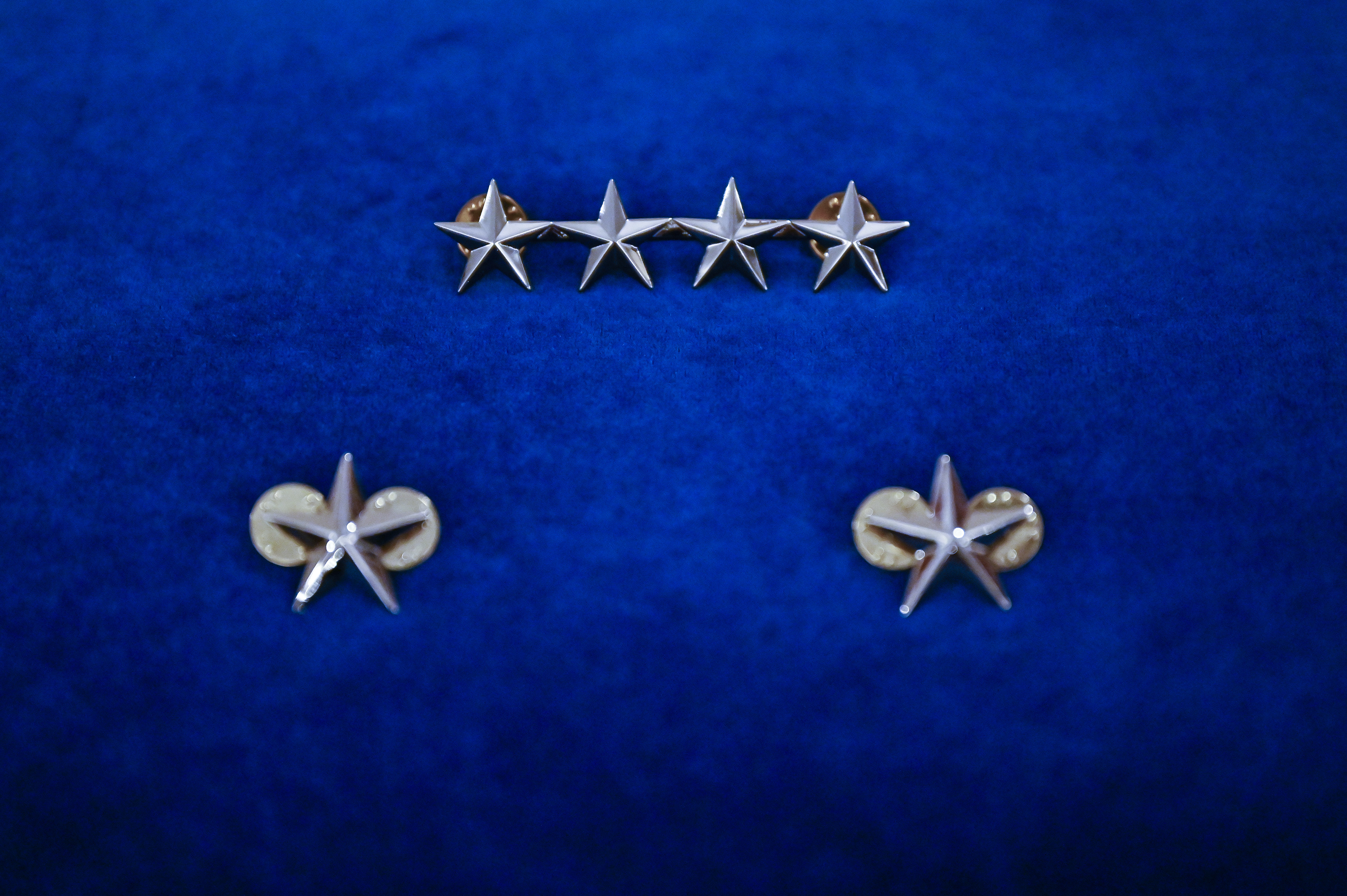
The four-star insignia of a Space Force general is displayed at the promotion ceremony for General B. Chance Saltzman, November 2, 2022.

Modern four-star officer appointments are governed by the unified officer promotion framework established by the Defense Officer Personnel Management Act (DOPMA) of 1980, as amended.

In 2017, Congress began separating military space activities into a standalone service, culminating in the Space Force Act of 2019 that redesignated Air Force Space Command as the United States Space Force, the first new military service since the Air Force was spun off from the Army in 1947.

== History ==
=== Appointment ===
==== Four-star appointments ====
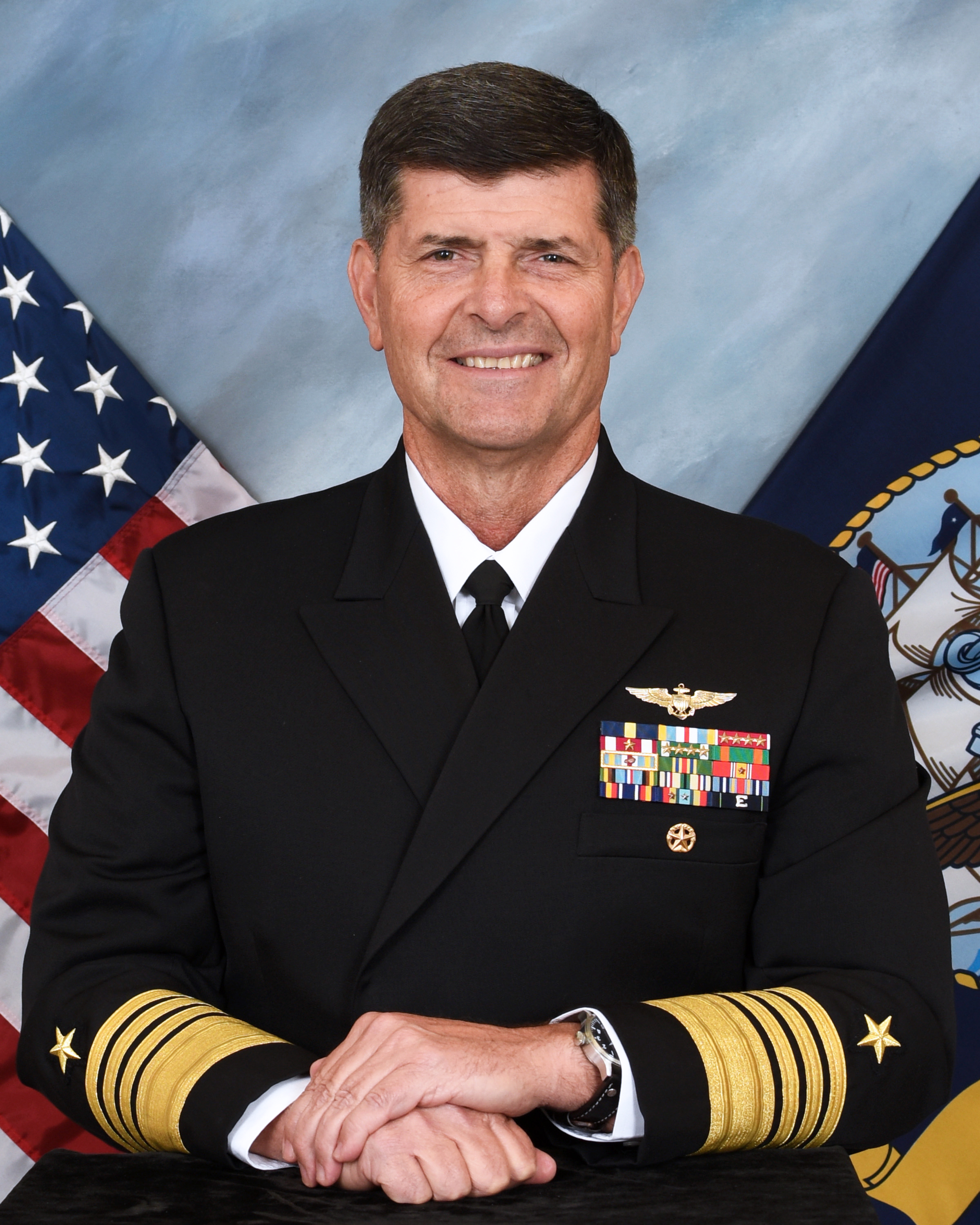
Admiral William F. Moran was nominated by the president and confirmed by the Senate to be chief of naval operations, but declined the appointment.

Starting in 1981, four-star officers were appointed under the unified officer promotion framework established by the Defense Officer Personnel Management Act (DOPMA) of 1980. An officer could be promoted to a maximum active-duty grade of major general or rear admiral, a rank-in-person that was carried to any assignment. Three- and four-star grades were rank-in-position that could only be held on active duty while serving in positions designated to carry those grades.

All four-star appointments required nomination by the president and confirmation by the Senate. In July 2019, a month after being confirmed by the Senate to be the next chief of naval operations (CNO) but before taking office, Admiral William F. Moran declined the appointment and retired upon being investigated for using his personal email to conduct official business with a former staff member who had been fired by the incumbent CNO for inappropriate personal conduct.

==== Appointments Clause ====
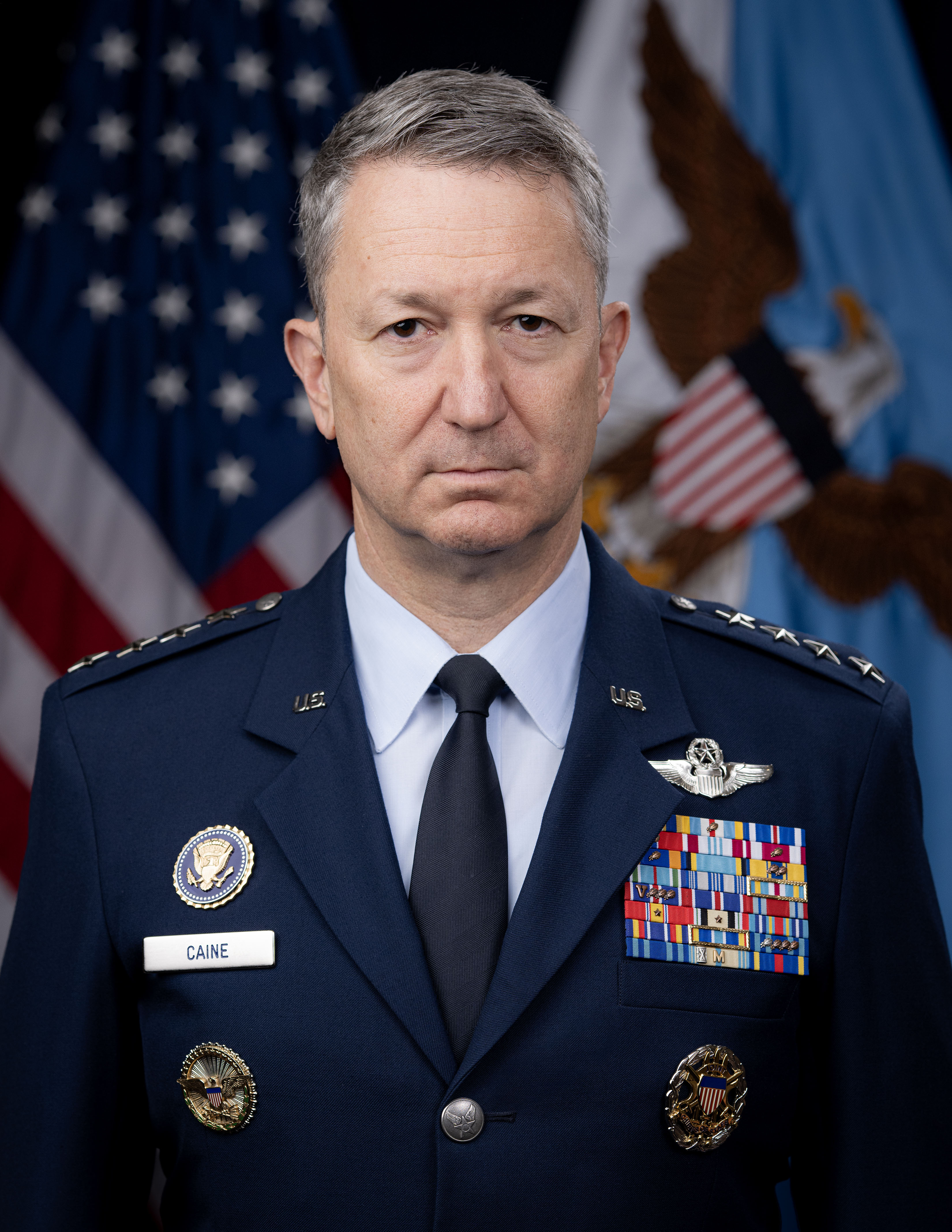
To be eligible to be chairman of the Joint Chiefs of Staff, Air National Guard officer John D. Caine was appointed as major general in the Regular Air Force under the Appointments Clause.

Under DOPMA, officers advanced through grades in order up to major general or rear admiral, with each promotion requiring a certain amount of time in grade. On rare occasions, the president would bypass the rigid DOPMA rules by nominating an officer for direct appointment to a grade under an alternate authority, the plenary presidential appointment power granted by the Appointments Clause of the Constitution (Article II, Section 2, Clause 2).

In 2025, a retired Air National Guard lieutenant general, John D. Caine, was nominated to be chairman of the Joint Chiefs of Staff, a position required by law to be filled by a regular officer of the armed services, not a reserve officer like Caine. To make him eligible for the job, he was nominated under the Appointments Clause to be appointed to the Regular Air Force in the grade of major general, its highest permanent active-duty grade, which the Senate voted to confirm immediately before confirming his nomination to be chairman. A similar mechanism had been used since 1977 to appoint civilians as three-star surgeon general of the United States (and, later, four-star assistant secretary for health), a position originally reserved for career commissioned officers of the Public Health Service, by simultaneously appointing them to the Public Health Service Commissioned Corps in its highest permanent active-duty grade of medical director, a practice sometimes derided as creating "instant admirals".

==== Delayed nominations ====
Delays in submitting a nomination could leave a four-star position vacant for months.

After the commanding general of Army Futures Command (AFC) retired in December 2021, the position was left vacant for almost a year because the president did not nominate a successor until September 2022. The secretary of defense, Army secretary, and Army chief of staff all recommended that the president nominate Lieutenant General Walter E. Piatt, but members of Congress blamed Piatt for delaying the military response to the attack on the United States Capitol on January 6, 2021, so the White House blocked his nomination until the Pentagon gave up and picked a different AFC commander. Lieutenant General Charles A. Flynn also attracted blame for the slow response, but was allowed to assume his four-star command of U.S. Army Pacific (USARPAC) in June 2021 because he had already been confirmed for that position in December 2020.

The top two positions in the National Guard fell vacant simultaneously in 2024, when the White House did not submit nominations for the new chief of the National Guard Bureau (CNGB) and vice chief of the National Guard Bureau (VCNGB) in time for the Senate to confirm them before their predecessors retired. All four leaders of the National Guard had long been scheduled to retire that summer, including the four-star CNGB, the three-star directors of the Army and Air National Guards, and the three-star VCNGB, whose successor was slated to be the first four-star VCNGB. Air National Guard lieutenant general Steven S. Nordhaus was finally nominated to be CNGB in August, shortly before the Senate left on a six-week recess, and the newly appointed Army National Guard director had to act as CNGB until Nordhaus could be confirmed in September. The VCNGB nominee, reported to be Army National Guard major general Joseph F. Jarrard, remained stalled in the White House even though the position had been vacant since May.

==== Grade caps ====
The National Defense Authorization Act for Fiscal Year 2010 (2010 NDAA) set numerical caps on the number of four-star officers, with dedicated allocations for each service—7 Army generals, 6 Navy admirals, 9 Air Force generals, 2 Marine Corps generals—and a separate pool of 20 joint-duty four-star officers. When the Army asked to restore a fourth star to its component commander in Europe and Africa in 2020, Congress raised the Army allocation to 8 but lowered the joint-duty allocation to 19, keeping the total number of four-star authorizations constant. The 2023 NDAA allocated 2 generals to the Space Force, corresponding to the chief and vice chief of space operations.

Effective December 31, 2022, the 2017 NDAA cut the total number of general and flag officers in joint-duty positions that were exempted from grade caps by 25 percent, but deleted the grade distribution restrictions for those positions, which previously had been limited to 19 joint-duty four-star officers. The 2025 NDAA authorized the secretary of defense to exempt an additional pool of up to 35 general or flag officer positions designated as the Secretary of Defense Adaptive Force Account.

==== Senate holds ====
A Senate hold on a nomination was a communication by a senator of an objection to approving the nomination by unanimous consent. Of the thousands of nominations submitted to the Senate each year, the majority were military promotions and appointments that were typically approved in large groups by unanimous consent, since considering them separately would take too much time. Although the full Senate could always override any individual hold by majority vote, the majority leader typically would try to resolve the senator's concerns before invoking the lengthy cloture process.

Sometimes a senator placed a hold on a nomination to escalate a dispute with the executive branch that had little to do with the specific nominee. In 1994, Senator David Durenberger placed a hold on the nomination of vice chief of naval operations Stanley R. Arthur to be commander in chief of U.S. Pacific Command, to pressure the Navy about a constituent's claim of being dropped from naval flight training after reporting sexual harassment by her instructor, and was surprised when the Navy withdrew Arthur's nomination rather than risk another controversial confirmation battle in the wake of the 1991 Tailhook sexual assault scandal. In 1997, three senators from Utah and Oklahoma placed holds on the nomination of Lieutenant General George T. Babbitt Jr. to be four-star commander of Air Force Materiel Command, in order to protest administration plans to privatize maintenance jobs instead of transferring them to Air Force logistics centers in their states.

In May 2020, Senator Dan Sullivan placed a hold for three weeks on the nomination of General Charles Q. Brown Jr. to be chief of staff of the Air Force, to pressure the Air Force to base the KC-46 tanker in his state. Two months later, Senator Tammy Duckworth blocked 1,123 Army promotions for two weeks, including the four-star chief of the National Guard Bureau, until she received written confirmation that the Department of Defense had not blocked the promotion of Army lieutenant colonel Alexander Vindman after he testified against the president during an impeachment inquiry.

In November 2024, Senator Markwayne Mullin placed a hold on the nomination of Lieutenant General Christopher T. Donahue to be four-star commanding general of Army forces in Europe and Africa. As a two-star general, Donahue had led the final evacuation of U.S. forces from Afghanistan in 2021, an operation whose messy outcome had been a campaign issue in the 2024 presidential election. Donahue was confirmed in early December, after Mullin dropped his hold.

==== Tuberville holds ====
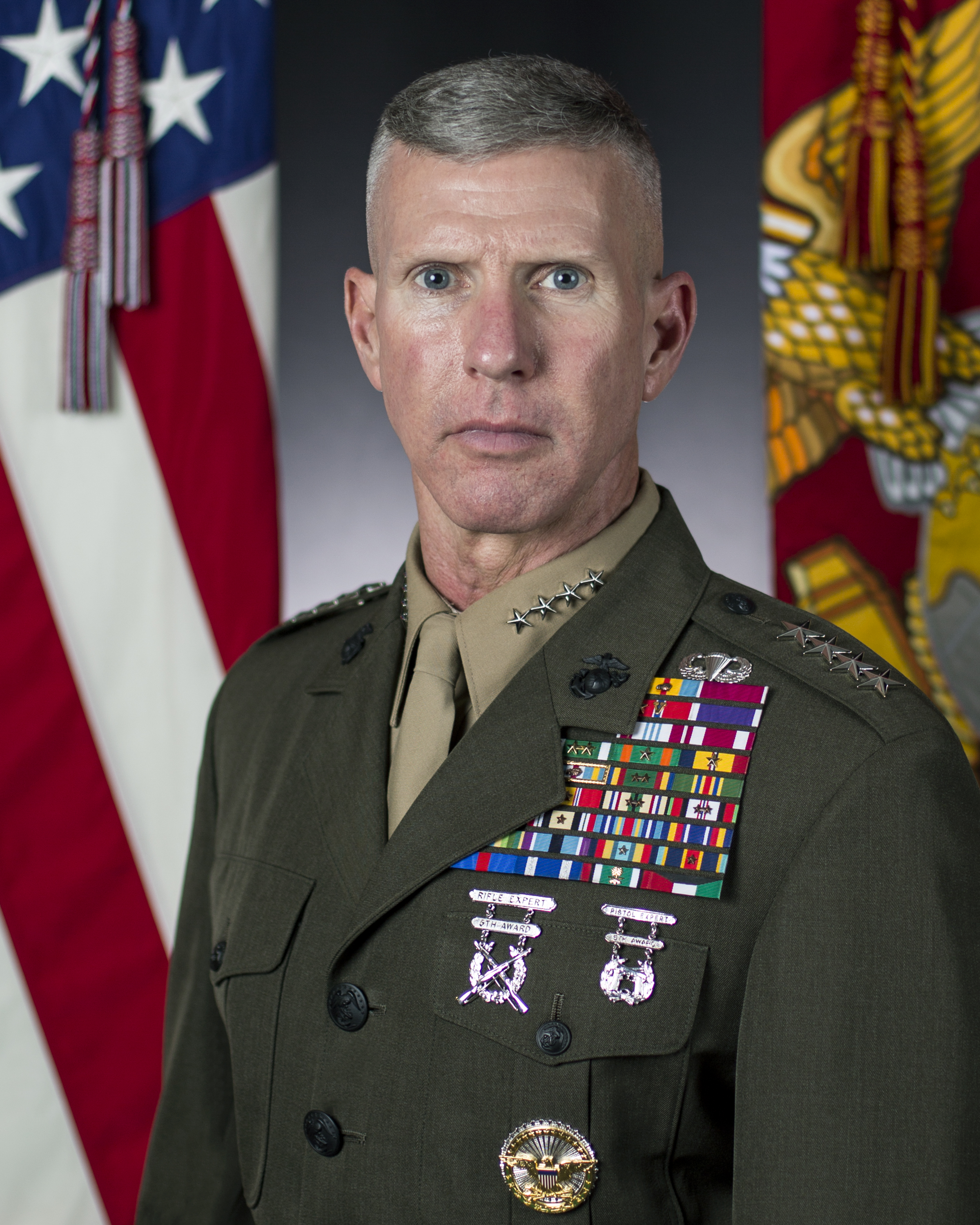
General Eric M. Smith suffered a heart attack after serving as both commandant and assistant commandant of the Marine Corps during a blanket Senate hold on military nominations.

In February 2023, Senator Tommy Tuberville placed a blanket hold on all civilian and military nominations in the Defense Department to pressure the secretary of defense to retract a December 2022 policy allowing servicemembers to travel to get legal abortions after the Supreme Court overturned Roe v. Wade in June 2022.

For most four-star officers, the delay in confirming their successors merely extended their tenure in office, but members of the Joint Chiefs of Staff had statutory four-year terms that could not be extended, so when their terms expired the service vice chiefs held double duty as acting chiefs. The four-year term of the Marine Corps commandant expired on July 11, the Army chief of staff on August 3, and the chief of naval operations on August 11, and the term of the chairman of the Joint Chiefs of Staff was scheduled to expire on October 1. On September 20, the Senate held individual votes to confirm the Air Force chief of staff as the next chairman, the Army vice chief of staff as chief of staff, and Marine Corps assistant commandant Eric M. Smith as commandant—leaving their former jobs vacant, since their successors had not been confirmed. Smith suffered a heart attack on October 29, and on November 2, the Senate confirmed a new assistant commandant to serve as acting commandant while Smith was hospitalized, as well as the nominees for Air Force chief of staff, and chief of naval operations.

On December 5, 2023, Tuberville finally released his hold on all but the remaining four-star nominees, 11 of whom were confirmed separately by the Senate on December 19. The Senate passed a bill to make all general and flag officer promotions delayed by the Tuberville holds retroactive to the dates expected if they had been confirmed normally, but the House took no action. The Senate included a similar provision in its version of the next year's annual defense authorization bill.

In 2024, Tuberville placed a hold on the July nomination of Lieutenant General Ronald P. Clark to be four-star commander of Army forces in the Pacific over Clark's role as senior military assistant to secretary of defense Lloyd Austin during Austin's secret hospitalization in January. Tuberville dropped his hold after a few weeks and Clark was confirmed in September.

=== Retirement ===
==== Certification of retired grade ====
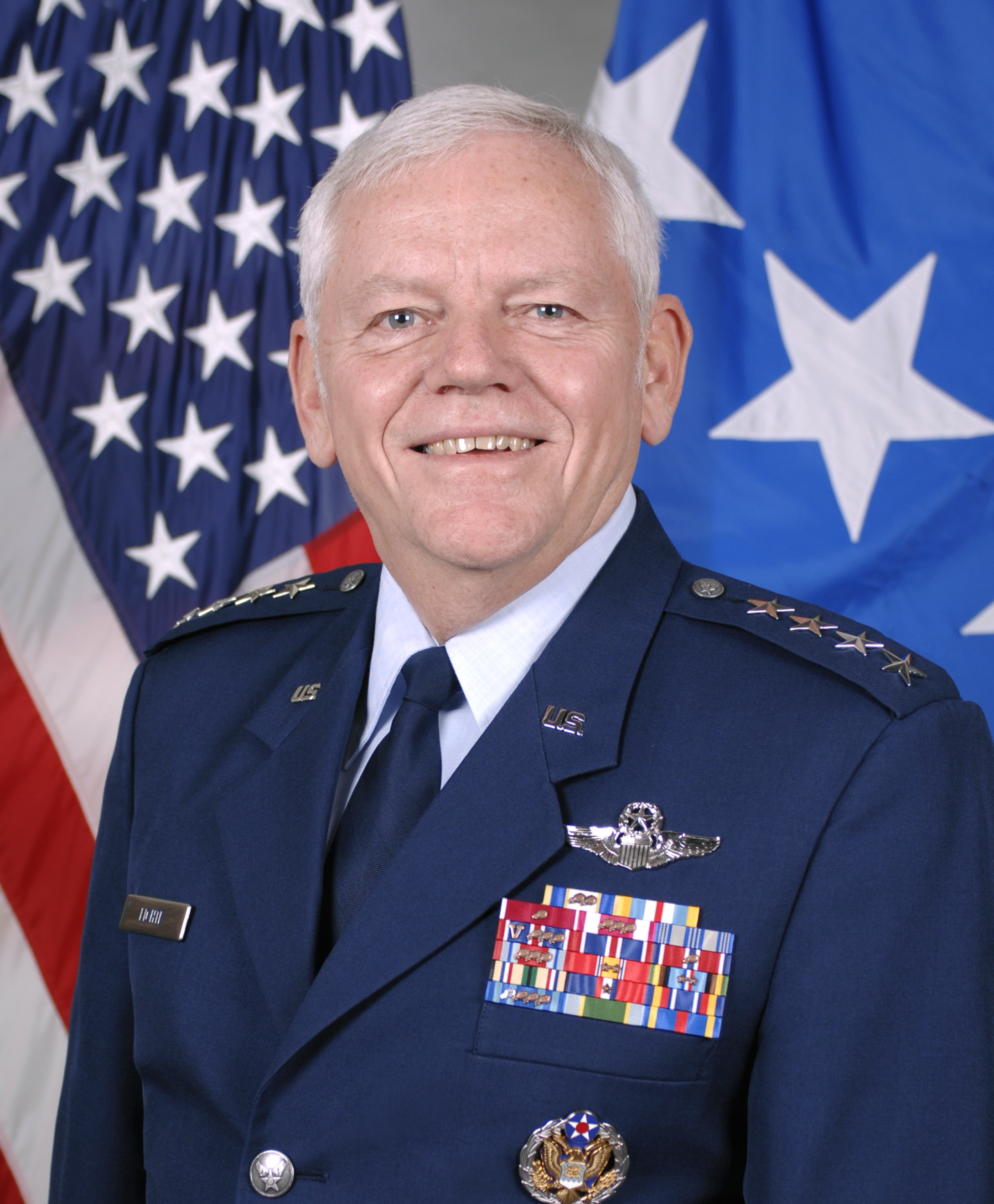
Retired Air Force general Arthur J. Lichte was retroactively demoted to major general when the secretary of defense withdrew his certification of satisfactory service.

After successfully serving in a three- or four-star position, an officer could retire with that grade if the secretary of defense certified that the officer had sufficient satisfactory service in that grade.

Four-star officers were routinely approved to retire in grade, unless accused of personal misconduct. Retired Air Force general Arthur J. Lichte was retroactively retired as a major general in 2017 when the secretary of defense withdrew his certification of satisfactory service as a four-star general after the Air Force Office of Special Investigations found Lichte had coerced sex from a subordinate officer while serving as three-star Air Force assistant vice chief of staff and as four-star commander of Air Mobility Command. In March 2024, Army general Charles R. Hamilton was suspended but not relieved as Army Materiel Command (AMC) commanding general for interfering with a subordinate's command assessment panel, leaving AMC with an acting commander for months while Hamilton was investigated by the Department of Defense inspector general.

=== Compensation ===
==== Pay caps ====
Compensation for four-star officers included a salary called basic pay, allowances for housing and food that were not subject to federal income tax, and an annual personal money allowance of $4,000 for members of the Joint Chiefs of Staff and $2,200 for other four-star officers. Basic pay for general and flag officers was capped at Level II of the Executive Schedule, so two-, three-, and four-star officers received about the same basic pay.

=== Positions ===
==== Army ====
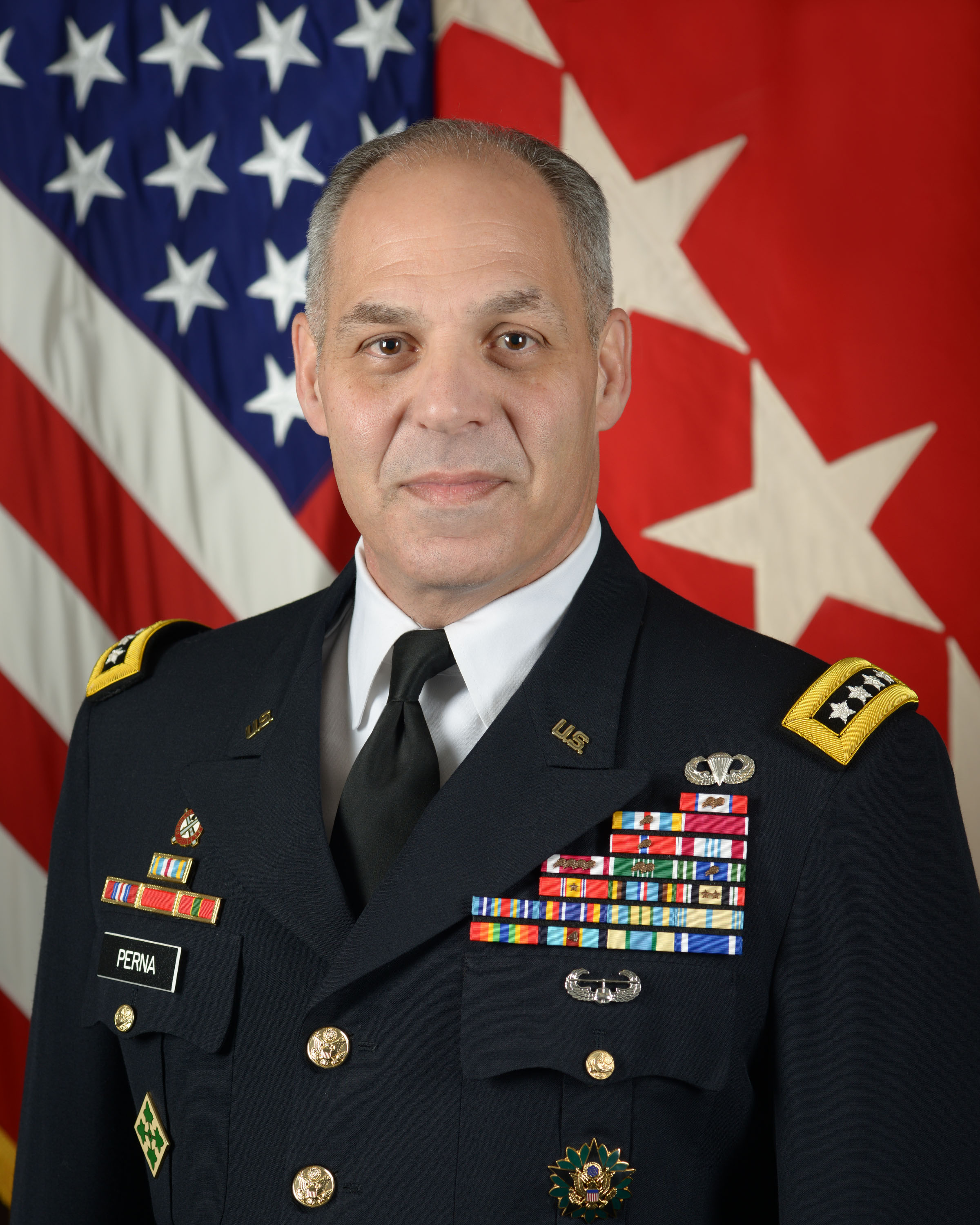
General Gustave F. Perna served as chief operating officer of Operation Warp Speed for one year after relinquishing command of Army Materiel Command.

The Army had been authorized 7 four-star generals for positions within the service by the National Defense Authorization Act for Fiscal Year 2010 (2010 NDAA), and employed 6 in 2017: the chief and vice chief of staff (CSA, VCSA); the commanding generals of Forces Command (FORSCOM), Training and Doctrine Command (TRADOC), and Army Materiel Command (AMC); and the Army component commander in the Pacific (USARPAC). The remaining slot was used to establish Army Futures Command (AFC) in 2018.

In July 2020, the three-star Army component commander in Europe, Christopher G. Cavoli, was nominated for a fourth star even though the Army was already using all 7 of its institutional four-star authorizations. The Senate confirmed him anyway, and he was promoted in October, giving the Army 8 service-specific four-star generals, which the 2021 NDAA ratified in December by allocating one more general to the Army and reducing the joint four-star pool to compensate.

By the end of 2020, the Army had 18 four-star generals on active duty, exceeding the 17 four- and five-star generals it had at the end of World War II (including the Army Air Forces) or the 17 four-star generals it had at the height of the Vietnam War, its previous peaks. The Army had won an unusually high number of joint-duty assignments to the competitive positions of chairman of the Joint Chiefs of Staff, chief of the National Guard Bureau, and combatant commanders of U.S. Africa Command (USAFRICOM), U.S. Cyber Command (USCYBERCOM), or U.S. Special Operations Command (USSOCOM); the expected position of commander of U.S. forces in Korea (USFK), traditionally an Army command; the unlikely positions of combatant commander of U.S. Transportation Command (USTRANSCOM) or U.S. Space Command (USSPACECOM), traditionally Air Force or Space Force commands; and the unrepeatable positions of final commander of U.S. forces in Afghanistan and chief operating officer of Operation Warp Speed, the federal government's COVID-19 vaccine development and delivery program.

Five years later, the Army had only 7 four-star generals on active duty, its lowest number since the middle of World War II, having failed to win any joint-duty assignments other than USFK. In late 2025, to reduce the number of headquarters and general officer positions, AFC and TRADOC were merged into a single four-star Transformation and Training Command (T2COM), FORSCOM was redesignated U.S. Army Western Hemisphere Command (USAWHC), and AMC was downgraded to three stars. At the end of the year, the only four-star generals in the Army were the chief and vice chief of staff, the USFK commander, the commanding generals of T2COM and USAWHC, and the component commanders in Europe and the Pacific.

==== Air Force ====
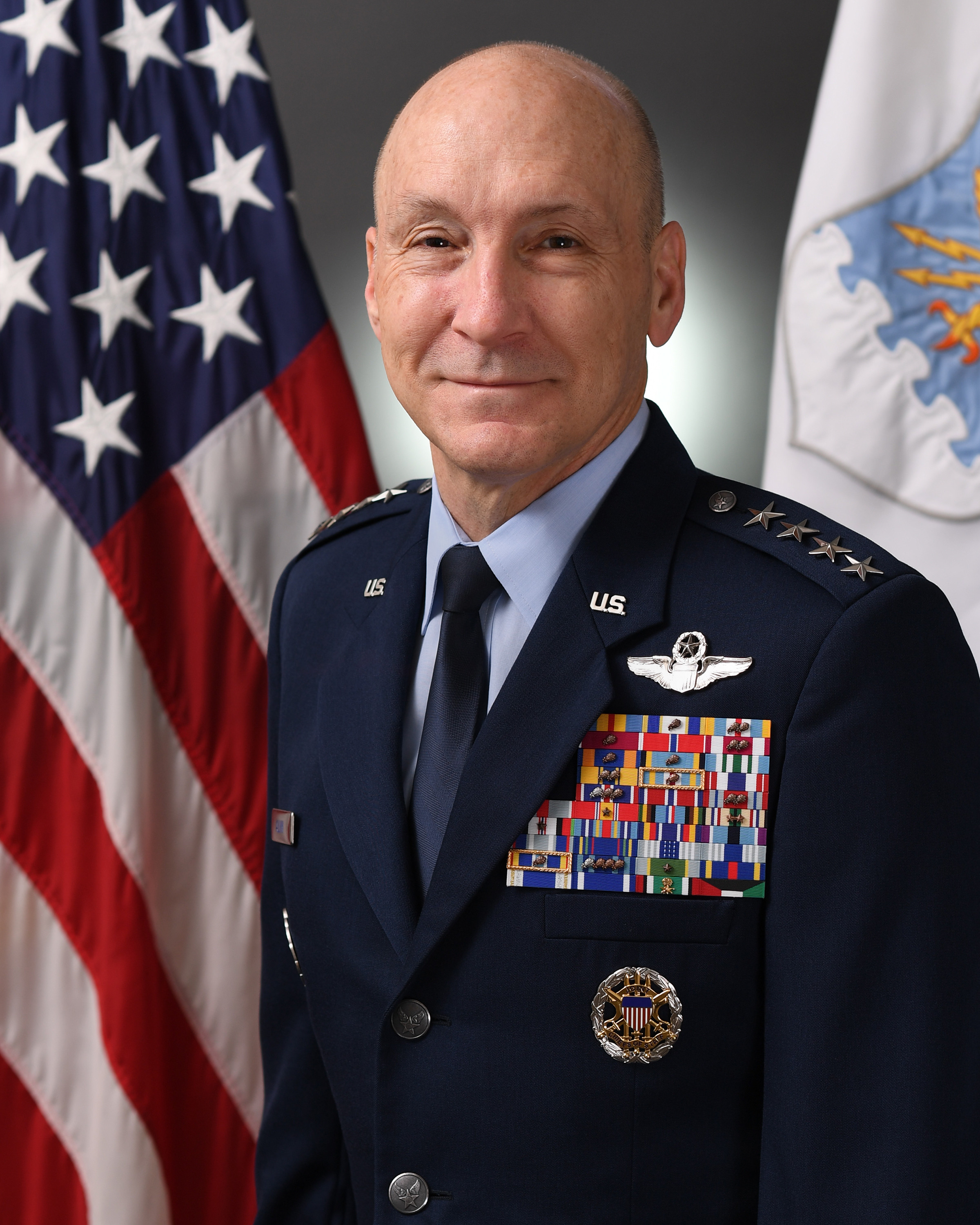
Congress formally established Air Force Global Strike Command as a four-star command to protect it from a planned reorganization whose rejection forced Air Force chief of staff David W. Allvin to retire halfway through his four-year term.

The Air Force had been authorized 9 four-star generals for positions within the service by the 2010 NDAA, corresponding in 2017 to the Air Force chief and vice chief of staff (CSAF, VCSAF); the commanders of Air Combat Command (ACC), Air Mobility Command (AMC), Air Force Materiel Command (AFMC), Air Force Space Command (AFSPC), and Air Force Global Strike Command (AFGSC); and the Air Force component commanders in Europe (USAFE) and the Pacific (PACAF).

AFSPC was redesignated as the United States Space Force (USSF) in December 2019 and its commander became the head of the new service. The 2023 NDAA established a separate four-star allocation for the Space Force but did not decrement the Air Force allocation to account for the spin-off of AFSPC.

In March 2024, the Air Force launched its biggest reorganization since the end of the Cold War. Instead of major commands being vertically integrated stovepipes that both developed and manned their own platforms—especially the quasi-independent ACC (fighters), AFGSC (bombers and missiles), and AMC (airlift)—their scope was reduced to force readiness, either within the service (ACC) or as Air Force components of joint-service commands (AFGSC, AMC). A skeptical Congress used the 2025 NDAA to bar any use of funds to modify AFGSC, noting that its current structure was a direct response to previous Air Force mismanagement of nuclear weapons. A year later, accusing the Air Force of continuing to tinker with AFGSC despite the law, Congress established AFGSC by statute in the 2026 NDAA, specifying a four-star grade for its commander. By then, the reorganization had been called off by a new administration, and its proponent, Air Force chief of staff David W. Allvin, was asked to retire only two years into his four-year term.

In May 2025, the secretary of defense directed a 20 percent reduction in four-star positions. The Air Force was a natural target, having 6 four-star positions within the service other than the chief and vice chief of staff, more than any other service. The scheduled retirements of the four-star ACC, AFGSC, AFMC, and USAFE-AFAFRICA commanders later that year provided opportunities to appoint three-star successors. ACC and AFGSC kept their four stars, but AFMC, AMC, and USAFE-AFAFRICA were downgraded to three stars.

==== Space Force ====
The Space Force was authorized 2 four-star generals for positions within the service by the 2023 NDAA, corresponding to the chief and vice chief of space operations (CSO, VCSO).

When the Space Force became an independent service in December 2019, the last AFSPC commander became the first CSO. The new service initially had no statutory limits on its distribution of general officer grades, so the secretary of the Air Force established a four-star VCSO administratively in October 2020. The 2023 NDAA imposed Space Force general officer grade caps similar to the other services, authorizing 2 four-star positions to cover the CSO and VCSO.

By mid-2025, the Space Force had 4 four-star generals, gaining the joint-duty positions of combatant commander of U.S. Space Command (USSPACECOM) and direct reporting program manager for the Golden Dome missile defense system.

==== Navy and Marine Corps ====
The Navy had been authorized 6 four-star admirals for positions within the service by the 2010 NDAA, corresponding in 2017 to the chief and vice chief of naval operations (CNO, VCNO), the commander of Fleet Forces Command (USFFC), the Navy component commanders in Europe (USNAVEUR) and the Pacific (USPACFLT), and the director of naval nuclear propulsion (NAVSEA-08). The Marine Corps was authorized 2 institutional four-star generals, corresponding to the commandant and assistant commandant (CMC, ACMC).

The Senate versions of the 2025 and 2026 NDAAs proposed giving the three-star commander of Naval Sea Systems Command (NAVSEA) a statutory eight-year term like the four-star director of naval nuclear propulsion, with possible promotion to admiral for the last three years.

==== Coast Guard ====
The Coast Guard had been authorized 2 four-star admirals since 2016: the commandant and vice commandant (CCG, VCCG). The 2022 NDAA required the vice commandant to serve at least two years as a four-star admiral in order to retire in that grade, similar to other four-star officers.

==== Public Health Service Commissioned Corps ====
The Public Health Service Commissioned Corps had been authorized 1 four-star admiral since 1990: the assistant secretary for health (ASH), if a commissioned officer.

==== Statutory terms for Joint Chiefs of Staff ====
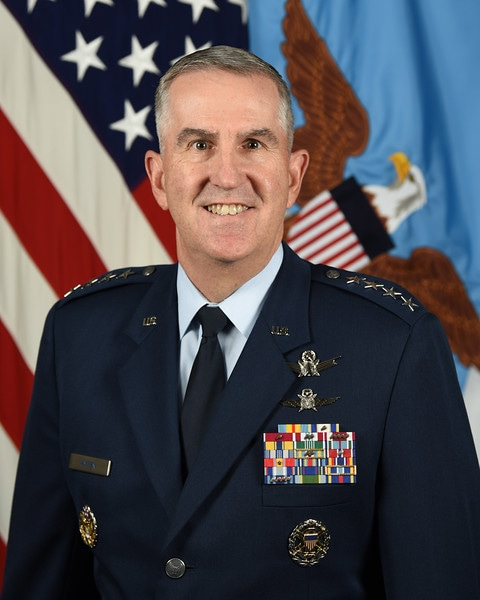
Air Force general John E. Hyten retired after only two years as vice chairman of the Joint Chiefs of Staff to stagger the terms of the chairman and vice chairman.

Congress gave service chiefs a statutory four-year term starting in 1969, with extensions beyond four years needing special legislation except during war or national emergency. The chairman of the Joint Chiefs of Staff (CJCS) typically also served four years in renewable two-year terms, as did the vice chairman. The chief of the National Guard Bureau, added to the JCS in 2008, inherited the four-year term limit set in 1920 for the chief of the Militia Bureau, and the National Defense Authorization Act for Fiscal Year 2017 (2017 NDAA) gave a single four-year term to the remaining JCS members, starting in 2019 for the chairman and 2021 for the vice chairman.

Whenever a service chief was promoted to chairman, the four-year tours of the new chairman and his successor as service chief became synchronized. When the 2017 NDAA was being drafted, the last three chairmen had been the Navy, Army, and Marine Corps chiefs, and if the Air Force got its turn next, as widely expected, every member of the JCS except the chief of the National Guard Bureau would turn over simultaneously in 2019. To preserve continuity in top military leadership, the 2017 NDAA offset the vice chairman's term by two years from the chairman's term, and barred the vice chairman from promotion or reassignment to any other military position. The last vice chairman appointed under the old rules, Air Force general John E. Hyten, retired after a single two-year term to achieve the desired staggering with the chairman's term.

So many senior officers were scheduled to end their tours in 2023 that Senate Armed Services Committee chairman Jack Reed said, "I have never in my almost three decades here seen so many key military positions coming up for replacement." Four-star nominees that year included the JCS chairman, the chief of every service except the Space Force, every service vice chief, and several key combatant commanders. When Senator Tommy Tuberville blocked all military nominations for ten months, most four-star incumbents remained in place until their replacements were confirmed, but not the service chiefs, whose terms could not be extended without special legislation. The Army, Navy, and Marine Corps chiefs retired on schedule that summer, leaving their services with only acting chiefs until their successors were confirmed along with the new JCS chairman and Air Force chief in September and November. With the statutory terms of five of eight JCS members now synchronized to expire within two months of each other, the 2024 NDAA authorized the secretary of defense to stagger the terms of the service chiefs, vice chairman, and chairman by extending or reducing their four-year terms by up to six months.

==== Vice chief of the National Guard Bureau ====
The vice chief of the National Guard Bureau (VCNGB) was created in 1988 to play the same role for the National Guard as the vice chiefs of the Army, Navy, Air Force, and Marine Corps, who all had the same four-star grade as their respective service chiefs. The VCNGB was likewise intended to carry the same three-star grade as the chief of the National Guard Bureau (CNGB) and be appointed from the opposite service, giving a three-star general to both the Army and Air National Guards, whose directors were then two-star generals. However, because neither CNGB nor VCNGB carried three-star grade by statute, any third star had to be charged to their respective service's grade cap, which the Air Force was unwilling to spend on the first VCNGB, an Air National Guard major general.

In 1994, Congress made the VCNGB the statutory two-star deputy to the three-star CNGB, who could not be from the same service. A decade later, the two-star VCNGB was redesignated as director of the Joint Staff of the National Guard Bureau, four years after being superseded in the CNGB succession when the Army and Air National Guard directors were given a third star. Congress reestablished the VCNGB as the CNGB's statutory three-star successor when it gave the National Guard full membership on the Joint Chiefs of Staff in 2011, and charged both positions to the joint-duty pool. The National Defense Authorization Act for Fiscal Year 2024 raised the VCNGB's grade to general, finally matching the CNGB, to which Army National Guard lieutenant general Thomas M. Carden Jr. was promoted in February 2026.

==== National Guard state ranks ====
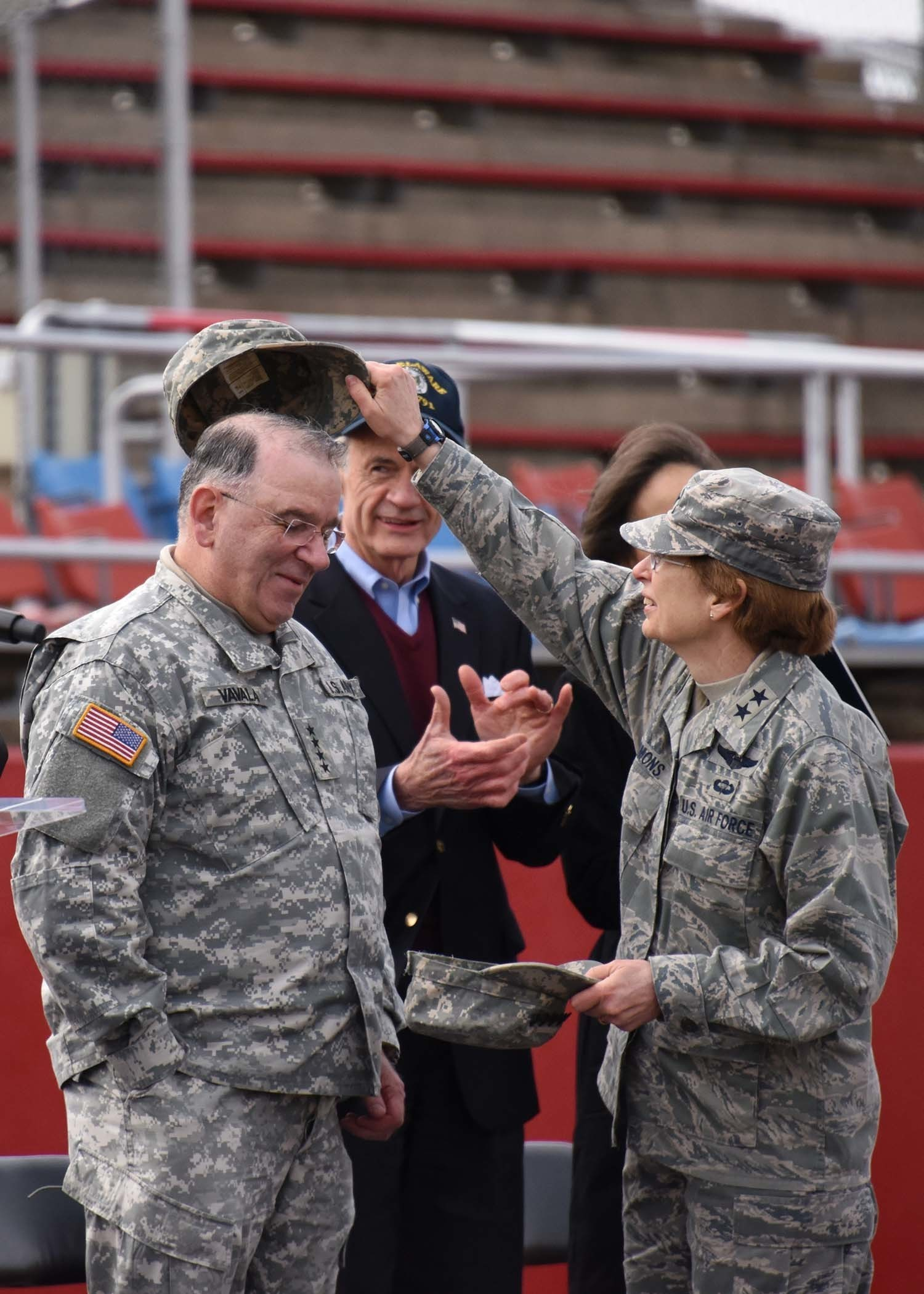
Retired Delaware adjutant general Francis D. Vavala was promoted to the state rank of general.

National Guard officers could have different ranks for federal and non-federal service if their state promoted them to grades that did not qualify for federal recognition. For example, states occasionally promoted their adjutant general to lieutenant general, but ranks above major general for state adjutants general were not federally recognized.

In 2008, the Delaware General Assembly authorized the governor to give the adjutant general the state rank of lieutenant general. The governor promoted National Guard major general Francis D. Vavala to that rank on January 7, 2017, three weeks before Vavala retired on January 31 after 18 years as Delaware adjutant general. On April 7, Vavala was promoted in retirement to the rank of general in the Delaware state militia.

=== U.S. Space Force ===
==== 2001 Space Commission ====
An independent space service was proposed as early as 1983, but picked up momentum in 1999 when the annual defense authorization act chartered a commission to assess the management and organization of national security space programs, chaired by former defense secretary Donald Rumsfeld. The Space Commission's final report in 2001 inspired many of the provisions of the Space Force Act in 2019. Judging that the existing space establishment was too small to support a standalone service immediately, the commission contemplated first creating a Space Corps within the Air Force that could grow into an independent Space Force, just as military aviation was incubated within the Army as the semi-autonomous Army Air Forces before becoming an independent Air Force. Senior defense and Air Force leaders spanning multiple administrations vigorously opposed a separate space service, arguing that it would only increase bureaucracy at the expense of aerospace integration.

==== Space Corps proposal ====
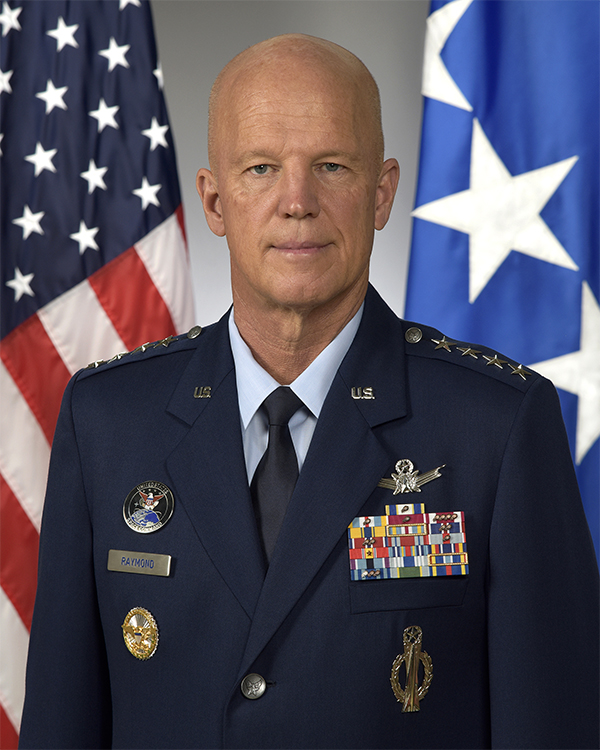
The last commander of Air Force Space Command, General John W. Raymond, became the first four-star general in the Space Force.

By early 2017, dissatisfaction over Air Force management of military space programs had revived congressional interest in an independent Space Corps, especially after Russia and China organized their own space-specific military branches in 2015. In April 2017, the Air Force tried to preempt the proposed Space Corps by adding a three-star deputy chief of space operations (A11) to the Air Staff, but in July the House passed a version of the annual defense authorization bill that established a Space Corps within the Department of the Air Force. The four-star chief of staff of the Space Corps would have a six-year term and full membership on the Joint Chiefs of Staff, co-equal with the Air Force chief of staff. The incumbent commander of Air Force Space Command (AFSPC) could be appointed as the first Space Corps chief of staff without further Senate consent. A four-star U.S. Space Command would be established as a subordinate unified command of U.S. Strategic Command, the same as U.S. Cyber Command.

Reaction to the House bill was skeptical. Dubbed "a solution in search of a problem" by a member of the Senate Armed Services Committee, the Space Corps was opposed by the defense secretary, Air Force secretary, Air Force chief of staff, and even the future Space Force chief, AFSPC commander John W. Raymond. The Senate amended the bill to prohibit the creation of any new service or corps, specifically including a Space Corps, and strengthened the AFSPC commander by mandating a six-year term with a possible extension to ten years. In December 2017, the final version of the National Defense Authorization Act for Fiscal Year 2018 (2018 NDAA) dropped the Space Corps proposal and abolished the A11 organization, which the conference report derided as a "hastily developed half-measure". Instead, all Air Force space activities were consolidated under AFSPC, whose commander now held a statutory four-star grade for a term of six years, modeled after the statutory eight-year term of the four-star director of the similarly technical Naval Reactors program.

Only six months later, at a June 2018 meeting of the National Space Council, President Donald Trump unexpectedly directed the Department of Defense (DoD) to immediately begin the process to establish the Space Force as the sixth branch of the armed forces, "separate but equal" with the Air Force. It was too late to add the necessary legislative changes to that year's defense authorization bill, so the DoD announced it would submit the Space Force proposal in the following year. In the meantime, the 2019 NDAA established U.S. Space Command (USSPACECOM) as a subordinate unified command of U.S. Strategic Command, with a statutory four-star commander. The AFSPC commander could serve concurrently as USSPACECOM commander for the first three years, after which the positions had to be separated.

==== Space Force Act ====
In February 2019, the DoD submitted a legislative proposal to establish an independent Space Force under the Department of the Air Force, in the same way that the Marine Corps was an independent service under the Department of the Navy. The House and Senate passed their own proposals that summer. The House proposal created a Space Corps with a four-star commandant, analogous to the Marine Corps. The DoD and Senate proposals both created a Space Force headed by two four-star generals, titled chief of staff and vice chief of staff by the DoD and commander and vice commander by the Senate. The DoD and House proposals gave the space service chief a seat on the Joint Chiefs of Staff (JCS) immediately, but the Senate proposal postponed full JCS membership for the commander of the Space Force by one year, during which the JCS chairman could invite the commander to attend meetings concerning Space Force issues, the same capacity in which the commandant of the Marine Corps and the chief of the National Guard Bureau had attended JCS meetings before being elevated to full members in their own right.

Critics observed that the Space Force would have by far the largest ratio of four-star officers to personnel of any service. In 2019, the entire Defense Department had 36 four-star officers to oversee 1.3 million active-duty service members, a ratio of one four-star officer for every 36,500 service members. By contrast, a Space Force with only 18,000 service members and 3 four-star generals—service chief, vice chief, and USSPACECOM commander—would have one four-star general for every 6,000 service members.

On December 20, 2019, the United States Space Force Act, part of the National Defense Authorization Act for Fiscal Year 2020 (2020 NDAA), redesignated Air Force Space Command as the United States Space Force, establishing the first new military service since the Air Force was spun off from the Army in 1947.

==== Chief of space operations ====
The Space Force Act transferred the dual-hatted AFSPC and USSPACECOM commander, Air Force general John W. Raymond, to the new service as its first chief of space operations (CSO). The CSO was granted full membership on the JCS after one year, but the JCS chairman invited Raymond to begin attending meetings immediately. The CSO could only be dual-hatted as USSPACECOM commander for a one-year transition period, so Raymond turned over command of USSPACECOM to Army general James H. Dickinson in August 2020.

==== Vice chief of space operations ====
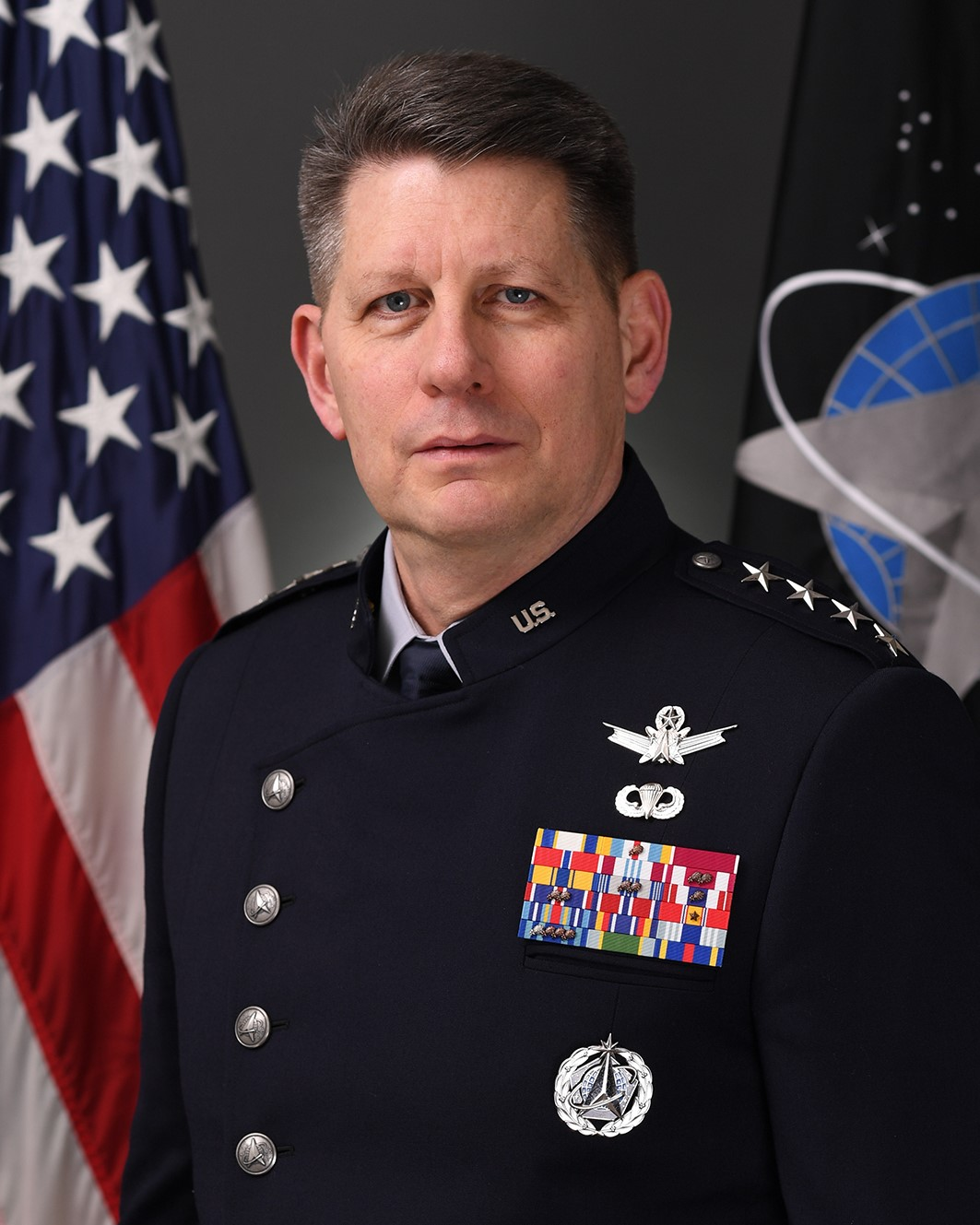
General David D. Thompson, first vice chief of space operations.

In October 2020, the Air Force lieutenant general serving as Space Force vice commander, David D. Thompson, was transferred to the Space Force to be the first vice chief of space operations (VCSO), a new four-star position established administratively by the secretary of the Air Force. The 2023 NDAA permanently allocated two generals to the Space Force, corresponding to the CSO and VCSO.

Starting in 2021, the Department of Defense submitted annual legislative proposals to give the Space Force vice chief the same statutory charter and grade as the other service vice chiefs, but none were included in the final NDAA. Alluding to the episode the previous summer when the Army, Navy, and Marine Corps vice chiefs had to exercise their statutory roles as successors to their service chiefs during Senator Tommy Tuberville's blanket hold on military nominations, the 2024 legislative proposal argued that the Space Force needed similar authority enshrined in law for the VCSO's grade, functions, and succession to the CSO, which were all defined by executive policy that could change at any time. The Senate included this provision in its version of the 2025 NDAA.

=== Posthumous promotions ===
On rare occasions, Congress authorized a posthumous promotion to four-star rank or higher, although the president might not choose to execute it immediately or at all.

==== George Washington ====
Congress first created the grade of General of the Armies of the United States in 1799 to promote former president George Washington, then serving as lieutenant general and commander in chief of the forces being raised for the Quasi-War with France, but he died without being promoted and the unused grade lapsed in 1802. Washington remained a lieutenant general who by 1953 was outranked by 45 other Army generals, living and dead, holding four- or five-star grades or the special General of the Armies grade awarded to World War I general John J. Pershing in 1919.

In 1976, as part of the United States Bicentennial celebration, Congress passed a law to prevent Washington from being outranked by any other Army officer, creating for him a new grade of General of the Armies with precedence over all previous Army grades, including Pershing's grade with the same title. The president signed the law on October 11, 1976, but the Department of the Army did not implement it until March 13, 1978, posthumously promoting Washington to the grade of General of the Armies of the United States, effective from the 200th anniversary of the Declaration of Independence on July 4, 1976.

==== Ulysses S. Grant ====
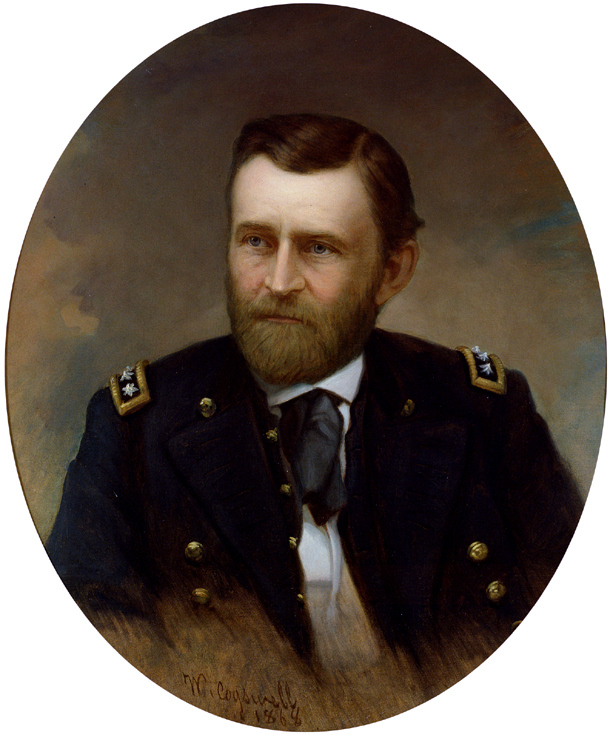
Ulysses S. Grant was posthumously authorized the grade of General of the Armies to commemorate his 200th birthday in 2022.

In 2021, joint resolutions authorizing the president to appoint Ulysses S. Grant posthumously to the grade of General of the Armies of the United States were introduced in the House and Senate by a bipartisan congressional delegation from his home states of Ohio, Missouri, and New York. In a letter to the secretary of defense, three of the bill's sponsors argued that by reestablishing the General of the Armies grade with "precedence over all other grades of the Army, past or present," the 1976 law authorizing Washington's promotion had effectively lowered the grade to which Grant was appointed in 1866.

Supporters of Grant's promotion hoped the law would pass in time for his 200th birthday on April 27, 2022, the date of rank specified in the bill, which was titled the "Ulysses S. Grant Bicentennial Recognition Act". The joint resolutions were referred to the House Armed Services Committee and Senate Judiciary Committee, neither of which took any action. Instead, the National Defense Authorization Act for Fiscal Year 2023 (2023 NDAA) used different language to authorize Grant's appointment to the grade of General of the Armies, adding a clause equating his rank and precedence to that of Pershing to avoid elevating Grant at Pershing's expense.

Like Washington, who was authorized the grade of General of the Armies in 1976 but not promoted until 1978, Grant's promotion was not immediately executed, and was pending through his 201st birthday in 2023. After the law was signed by the president, the secretary of defense approved and issued a memorandum to the secretary of the Army to posthumously advance Grant to General of the Armies on April 19, 2024.

==== Husband E. Kimmel ====
The 2001 NDAA asked the president to posthumously advance Navy rear admiral Husband E. Kimmel on the retired list to the four-star rank he lost upon being fired as Pacific Fleet commander after the attack on Pearl Harbor in 1941. The president already had the authority to advance Kimmel under the Officer Personnel Act of 1947, so Congress could only urge the president to actually make the promotion. However, no president had promoted Kimmel as of 2024, and the Navy Department turned down a request from his family as recently as 2023.

==== John D. Lavelle ====
In 1972, four-star Seventh Air Force commander John D. Lavelle was fired for conducting unauthorized airstrikes during the Vietnam War and retired in his permanent two-star grade. In 2010, he was posthumously nominated to be advanced to general on the retired list after declassified White House tapes suggested that Lavelle actually did have prior authorization for the airstrikes. The Senate Armed Services Committee rejected his nomination, saying the historical record was incomplete, so the Department of the Air Force commissioned a review led by former director of the Federal Bureau of Investigation and director of central intelligence William H. Webster, who recommended in 2015 that Lavelle be posthumously advanced to lieutenant general, not general. However, the Air Force Board for Correction of Military Records (AFBCMR) ruled the next year that Lavelle should be restored to his four-star rank.

In 2024, the House and Senate versions of the 2025 NDAA both included provisions to posthumously advance Lavelle on the retired list. The Senate version implemented Webster's recommendation to advance Lavelle only to lieutenant general, but the House version directed the secretary of defense to recommend a posthumous rank based on the AFBCMR ruling. The final law used the Senate language that limited Lavelle's retired rank to lieutenant general. The next year, the House version of the 2026 NDAA again tried to restore Lavelle's four-star rank based on the AFBCMR ruling, but the provision was dropped in negotiation with the Senate.

== Legislation ==
Legislation	Citation	Summary	Service
Act of January 20, 2017	131 Stat. 6	Waived ban on a regular commissioned officer being appointed secretary of defense within 7 years of relief from active duty, for the first person appointed after the date of enactment of this act, if they are within 3 and 7 years of relief from active duty (James N. Mattis).	USMC
Act of December 12, 2017 [National Defense Authorization Act for Fiscal Year 2018]	131 Stat. 1718	Specified grade of general and term of six years for commander of Air Force Space Command.; Provided that incumbent commander of Air Force Space Command could serve the six-year term without further appointment (John W. Raymond).	USAF
Act of August 13, 2018 [John S. McCain National Defense Authorization Act for Fiscal Year 2019]	132 Stat. 2101	Established subunified command for joint space warfighting operations, whose commander has the grade of general or admiral [repealed in 2019 (133 Stat. 1722)].; Provided that commander of Air Force Space Command could serve concurrently as commander of U.S. Space Command for its first three years (John W. Raymond).	USAF
Act of December 20, 2019 [United States Space Force Act]	133 Stat. 1561; 133 Stat. 1563; 133 Stat. 1564	Redesignated Air Force Space Command as U.S. Space Force.; Established chief of space operations with grade of general and term of four years.; Provided that incumbent commander of Air Force Space Command could serve as chief of space operations without further appointment (John W. Raymond).; Provided that chief of space operations could serve concurrently as commander of U.S. Space Command for one year, without further appointment (John W. Raymond).; Added chief of space operations to Joint Chiefs of Staff after one year.	USSF
Act of January 1, 2021 [William M. (Mac) Thornberry National Defense Authorization Act for Fiscal Year 2021]	134 Stat. 3563; 134 Stat. 3821	Increased cap on Army generals from 7 to 8 and decreased cap on joint-duty generals or admirals from 20 to 19.; Authorized Space Force officers in any grade above colonel to be assigned to a position designated by the president to carry the grade of general.	USA, USN, USAF, USMC, USSF
Act of January 20, 2021	131 Stat. 3	Waived ban on a regular commissioned officer being appointed secretary of defense within 7 years of relief from active duty, for the first person appointed on or after January 20, 2021, if they are within 4 and 7 years of relief from active duty (Lloyd J. Austin III).	USA
Act of December 23, 2022 [James M. Inhofe National Defense Authorization Act for Fiscal Year 2023]	136 Stat. 2557; 136 Stat. 2558; 136 Stat. 2611; 136 Stat. 4039	Capped Space Force officers in the grade of general at 2, exempting generals assigned to joint duty.; Increased time a general or admiral can remain in grade from 60 days to 90 days, if pending retirement after at least one year deployed outside the United States in a combat zone or contingency operation.; Authorized posthumous promotion of Ulysses S. Grant to General of the Armies with the same rank and precedence as John J. Pershing.; Required vice commandant of the Coast Guard to serve at least two years to become eligible to retire as admiral.	USA, USN, USAF, USMC, USSF, USCG
Act of December 22, 2023 [National Defense Authorization Act for Fiscal Year 2024]	137 Stat. 241; 137 Stat. 244	Authorized secretary of defense to stagger appointments of the Joint Chiefs of Staff by extending or reducing their statutory terms by up to six months.; Increased grade of vice chief of the National Guard Bureau to general.	USA, USN, USAF, USMC, USSF, NGB
Act of December 23, 2024 [Servicemember Quality of Life Improvement and National Defense Authorization Act for Fiscal Year 2025]	138 Stat. 1868; 138 Stat. 1873; 138 Stat. 1886; 138 Stat. 1936	Exempted from grade caps up to 35 general or flag officers in positions designated as the Secretary of Defense Adaptive Force Account.; Specified grade of general for vice chief of space operations.; Posthumously advanced former Air Force general John D. Lavelle to lieutenant general on the retired list.; Capped retired pay base of officers who served in O-9 or O-10 grades but retired at O-8 grade, at either the basic pay of their retired grade or the average of their 36 highest-paid months of active service, whichever is lower.	USA, USN, USAF, USMC, USSF
Act of December 18, 2025 [National Defense Authorization Act for Fiscal Year 2026]	139 Stat. 1191	Specified grade of general for commander of Air Force Global Strike Command.	USAF

== See also ==
- Legislative history of United States four-star officers
- Legislative history of United States four-star officers until 1865
- Legislative history of United States four-star officers, 1866–1898
- Legislative history of United States four-star officers, 1899–1946
- Legislative history of United States four-star officers, 1947–1979
- Legislative history of United States four-star officers, 1980–2016
