= Legislative history of United States four-star officers until 1865 =

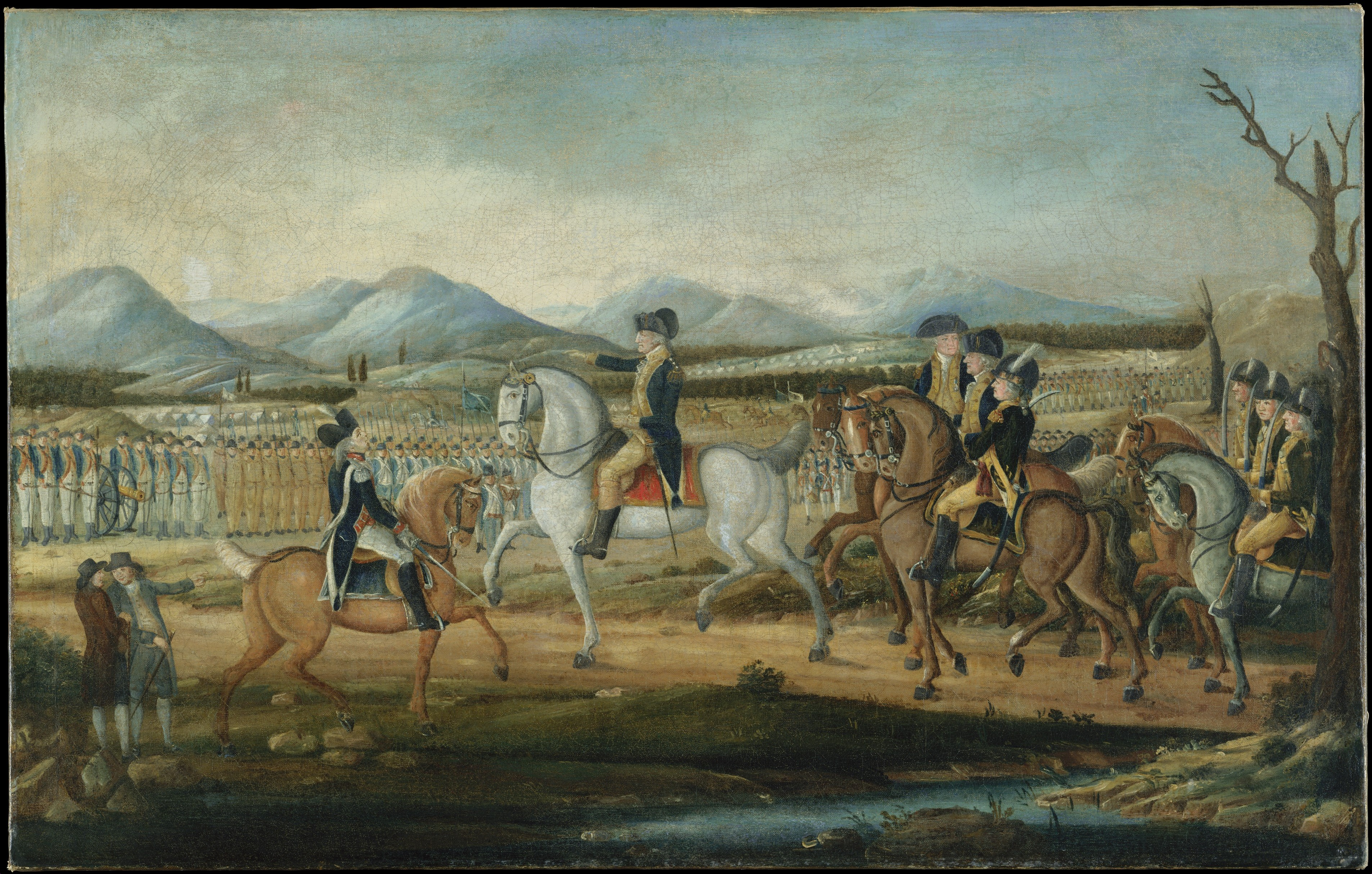
Washington Reviewing the Western Army at Fort Cumberland, Maryland, by Frederick Kemmelmeyer

Four-star grades in the United States are descended from offices and titles used by civil and military officials in the Thirteen Colonies. Starting in the early 1600s, the commission of a colonial governor granted him the same power to raise and command troops in his province as the captain general of an army. A century later, general officers in the British Army had stratified into the four standard ranks of the modern hierarchy—general, lieutenant-general, major general, and brigadier general—with corresponding flag officer ranks in the Royal Navy.

George Washington was general and commander in chief of the Continental Army during the Revolutionary War, and there were four British general officers in North America during the war. After serving as the first president of the United States, Washington was authorized but not appointed to the grade of General of the Armies of the United States during the Quasi-War with France.

During the American Civil War, the Confederate States of America appointed eight full generals and an admiral. The highest ranking Union army officers were a lieutenant general and a vice admiral, Ulysses S. Grant and David G. Farragut, who became the first four-star officers in the United States military, but not until after the war.

== History (colonial era) ==
Four-star grades in the United States are descended from offices and ranks used by civil and military officials in the Thirteen Colonies from the early 17th century to the end of the Revolutionary War in 1783.

Until the mid-1600s, all military and naval ranks were held by offices, not individuals. Each rank was the title of a unique billet in a unit that typically disbanded at the end of each campaign (the vice admiral of a squadron, the lieutenant colonel of a regiment). Ranks in the modern sense only began to appear during the English Civil War, when the creation of a standing army and navy provided a permanent organization in which officers could sustain personal ranks between temporary assignments (a vice admiral in the navy, a lieutenant colonel in the army).

The colonial era straddled the transition from rank-in-office to rank-in-person. Early colonial governors received commissions granting them civil and military power within their provinces, including titles that later evolved into military ranks like captain general and admiral. The constitutions of the states of Connecticut and Rhode Island continue to designate their governors as captain general of the state militia when not under federal command.

=== Colonial governors ===
It was standard practice to bundle the office of captain general in the commission of a colonial governor, typically a civilian, so he could raise and command militia to defend his province. Governors nominally commanded any regular army forces within their provinces until the French and Indian War, when command of all regulars was consolidated under a single commander in chief for North America.

==== Captain general and commander in chief ====
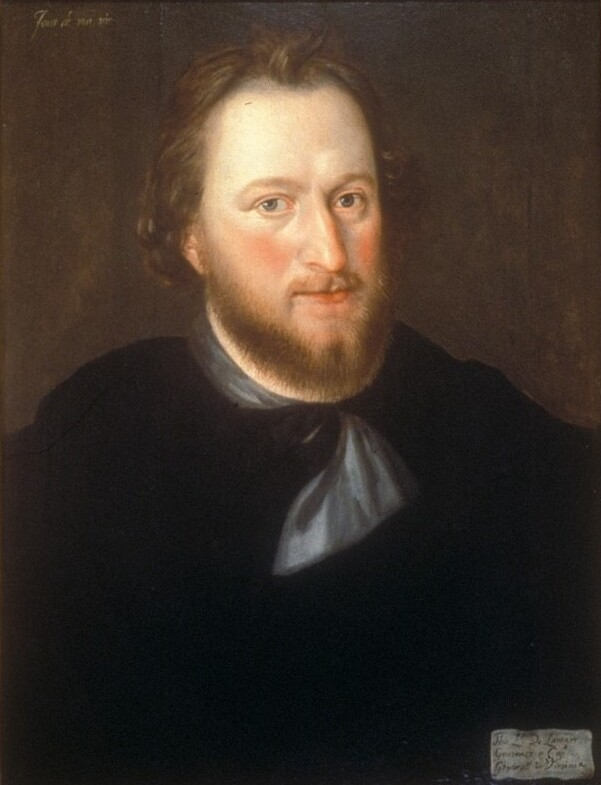
Thomas West, 3rd Baron De La Warr, governor and captain general of the colony of Virginia.

In 1606, King James I of England granted the Virginia Company of London a royal charter to establish what became the first successful English colony in North America, the proprietary colony of Virginia at Jamestown. Three years later, the charter was amended to let the company name a colonial governor who could use force to defend the colony and had the same power to impose martial law as the lord-lieutenant of an English county. The company issued a commission to Thomas West, 3rd Baron De La Warr, to be governor-for-life and captain general, giving him the military authority to wage war against the indigenous Powhatan tribes when he arrived in Virginia in 1610. Subsequent colonial governors of Virginia retained the title of captain general even after Virginia was converted to a royal colony when the company collapsed in 1624.

In 1629, King Charles I of England issued a patent for Sir Robert Heath to be lord proprietor for a new colony of Carolana. The patent authorized Heath and his heirs and assignees, or their chosen subordinates, to muster provincial troops that could make war even outside the province, and do anything else pertaining to the "right & office of a Captaine Generall" with as "full & free power as any Captaine Generall ever had." Heath never founded his colony, but similar language appeared in the charters for subsequent proprietary colonies, including Maryland in 1632, Carolina in 1663, and Pennsylvania in 1681. The proprietary governor could delegate military authority to subordinate officers, such as when Captain Thomas Cornwaleys was commissioned as captain general in Maryland to lead an expedition against the Susquehannock in 1642.

==== Commander-in-chief, North America ====
At the start of the French and Indian War, no continent-wide authority existed in North America to organize collective defense. Provincial troops from each colony reported only to their own governor, and the regular army reported only to the king. In February 1755, British Army major general Edward Braddock arrived in America with two regular Irish regiments and a commission as "commander in chief of all forces raised or to be raised in North America", with broad authority to direct colonial governors to fund and supply his regular army troops. Rather than support Braddock's regular army in Virginia, the northern colonies raised a separate provincial army to attack Fort Niagara in New York under Massachusetts Bay governor William Shirley, who was commissioned major general in the British Army to command the expedition. When Braddock was killed at the battle of the Monongahela in July 1755, Shirley served as temporary commander in chief until relieved by a third British Army major general, John Campbell, 4th Earl of Loudoun, who arrived from England in July 1756.

Loudoun held an unprecedented combination of civil and military powers that effectively made him viceroy of North America. In addition to the standard military commission as commander in chief and a civil commission as governor of Virginia, Loudoun held a commission under the Great Seal on March 17, 1756, as "General and Commander in Chief of all and singular our Forces employed or to be employed in North America" that outranked any civil commissions issued to colonial governors. In the event of his death or disability, succession to his commission under the Great Seal would descend through the military chain of command, which Loudoun interpreted as removing command of regular troops from the governors, even in their own provinces. After failing to capture Louisbourg in 1757, Loudoun was replaced by his second in command and his viceregal powers were dispersed. The secretary of state for the Southern Department in England resumed direct supervision of the governors and the commander in chief reverted to a primarily military role.

==== Captain general of West Florida ====
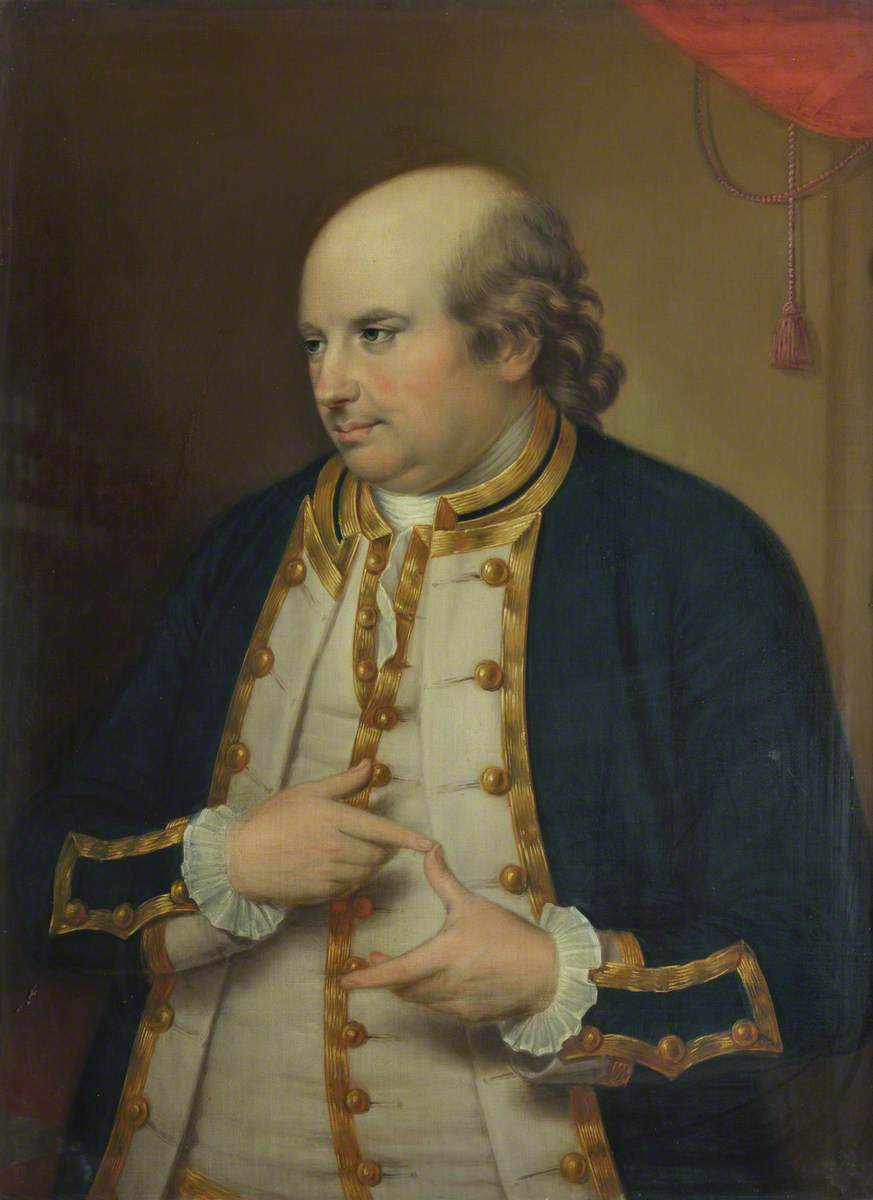
West Florida colonial governor George Johnstone tried to use his commission as captain general to command regular army officers in his province.

In 1764, the governor of the new colony of West Florida, Royal Navy post captain George Johnstone, tried to invoke his royal commission as "Captain-General and Governor in Chief" to issue commands to regular army officers stationed in his province. The regulars refused Johnstone's orders, saying their chain of command ran through the military commander-in-chief in North America, British Army major general Thomas Gage, who stated that in his ten years of service on that continent, no civilian governor ever had command of regular army troops, and the king never meant for provincial civilian governors to control imperial military forces charged with continental defense.

Johnstone appealed to London to confirm his gubernatorial commission as equivalent to a military commission. Instead, the king issued an order in February 1765 clarifying that regular army officers reported exclusively to the military commander in chief, and could be issued only high-level commands by civilian governors that did not contradict orders from the commander in chief, and only in his absence. Gage demanded Johnstone be fired as governor, and he was recalled in 1767. A similar attempt to command local regular forces led to the recall of the governor of Quebec, British Army major general James Murray, in 1765.

The 1765 order was a specific complaint of the First Continental Congress in 1774, which construed it as imposing military government in the colonies.

==== State governors ====
By the start of the American Revolutionary War in 1775, every colonial governor held a royal commission as captain general, governor in chief, and vice admiral that let him command provincial land and sea forces, but not imperial forces. After the Declaration of Independence was unanimously adopted in 1776, early state constitutions for New Hampshire, Massachusetts, Connecticut, New York, Delaware, North Carolina, and Vermont continued to give their governors some combination of the offices of "Captain General and Commander-in-Chief and Admiral".

As late as 2024, the constitutions of Connecticut and Rhode Island still designated their governors as "captain general of the militia of the state" or "captain general and commander in chief of the military and naval forces of the state" when their forces were not under federal command.

=== British Army ===
==== General officer ranks ====
General officer ranks in the permanent establishment of the British Army emerged from the professional standing armies of the mid-1600s, including the New Model Army and the Royalist Army in Exile of the English Civil War and their postwar successors, the English, Scots, and Irish standing armies from which the British Army is descended.

During the War of the Spanish Succession, the captain general or lord general had overall command of the army, and subordinate general officer ranks were distinguished by branch: for cavalry, general of horse, lieutenant general of horse, and commissary general; for infantry, general of foot, lieutenant general of foot, and sergeant major general; for mounted infantry, sergeant major general of dragoons; for artillery, general or lieutenant general of the ordnance. Branches were dropped from the ranks of lieutenant general and below by the end of the war in 1714, but the rank of general remained tied to a branch or temporary special service—general of horse, general of foot, general while commander in chief of a geographic theater—until 1761, when eight lieutenant generals were promoted to general without distinction by branch.

==== General promotion ====
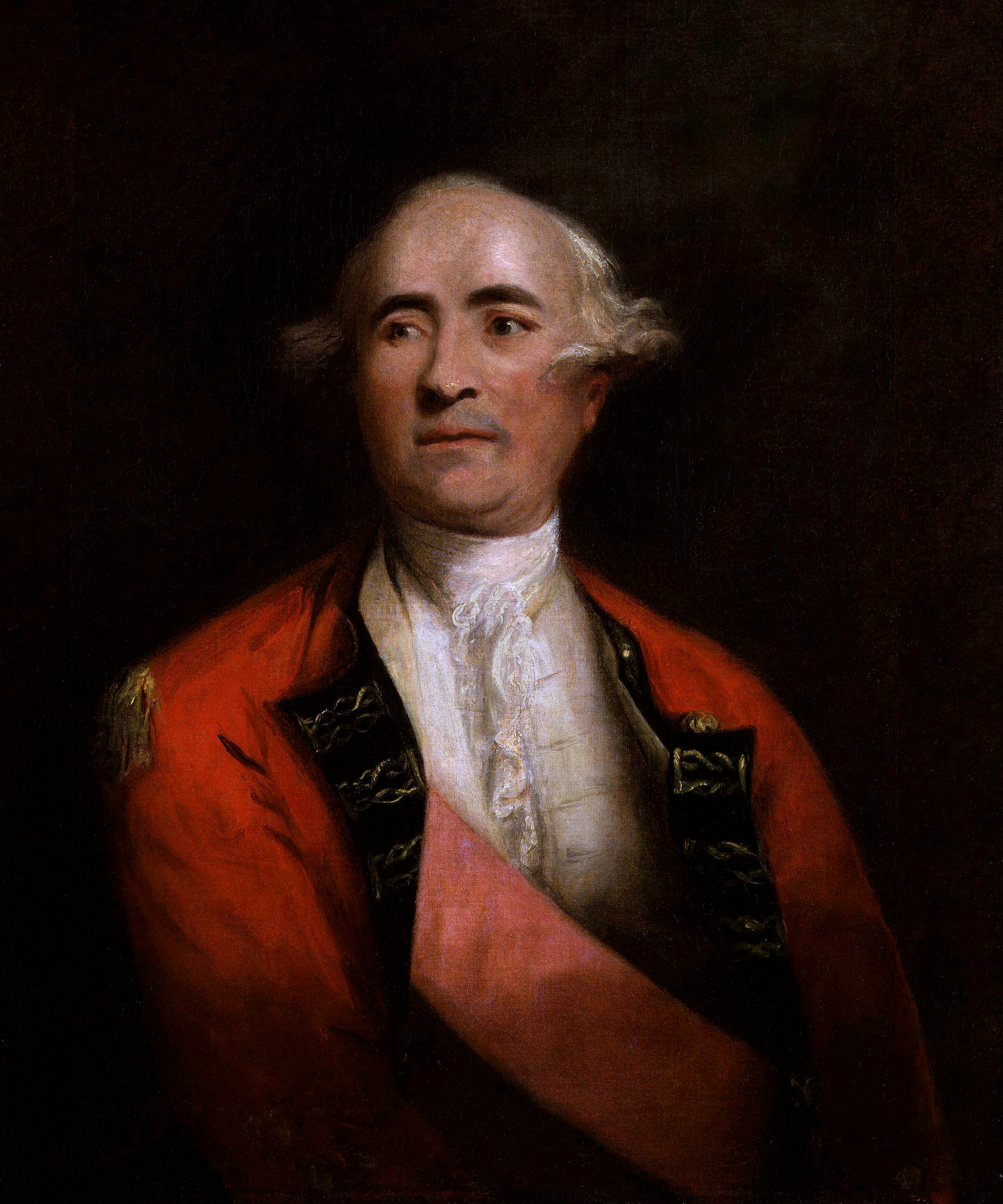
British Army lieutenant general Frederick Haldimand died before the general promotion that would have advanced him to the rank of general that he previously held only in America.

Every few years, batches of officers with the same seniority were automatically advanced to the next rank in general promotions. For example, the general promotion of December 1735 advanced 10 lieutenant generals, 24 major generals, and 39 brigadier generals from their previous ranks. The two senior lieutenant generals, Richard Boyle, 2nd Viscount Shannon and François de La Rochefoucauld, Marquis de Montandre, were promoted to general of horse and general of foot, respectively, anticipating the vacancies in that rank created by the promotion of the two senior generals of foot, George Hamilton, 1st Earl of Orkney and John Campbell, 2nd Duke of Argyll, to the new rank of field marshal that was created in January 1736 to give British officers parity with allied counterparts abroad. The next general promotion in July 1739 promoted Shannon and Montandre to field marshal, every brigadier general to major general, every major general to lieutenant general, and the five senior lieutenant generals to general of horse or foot.

The general promotion of May 1772 advanced 28 colonels to major general, including all four officers who eventually held the local rank of general in America during the Revolutionary War: Frederick Haldimand, Guy Carleton, William Howe, and Henry Clinton. In March 1776, Carleton and Howe were promoted to the local rank of general in America only, and Clinton to the local rank of lieutenant general. Clinton and Haldimand received the local rank of general upon succeeding Howe and Carleton in 1778. All four officers were promoted to lieutenant general in the permanent establishment by the general promotion of September 1777, along with 33 other major generals of similar seniority. Haldimand died in 1791, missing the general promotion of 1793 that would have advanced him permanently to general along with Carleton, Howe, Clinton, and 24 other lieutenant generals.

==== Temporary rank ====
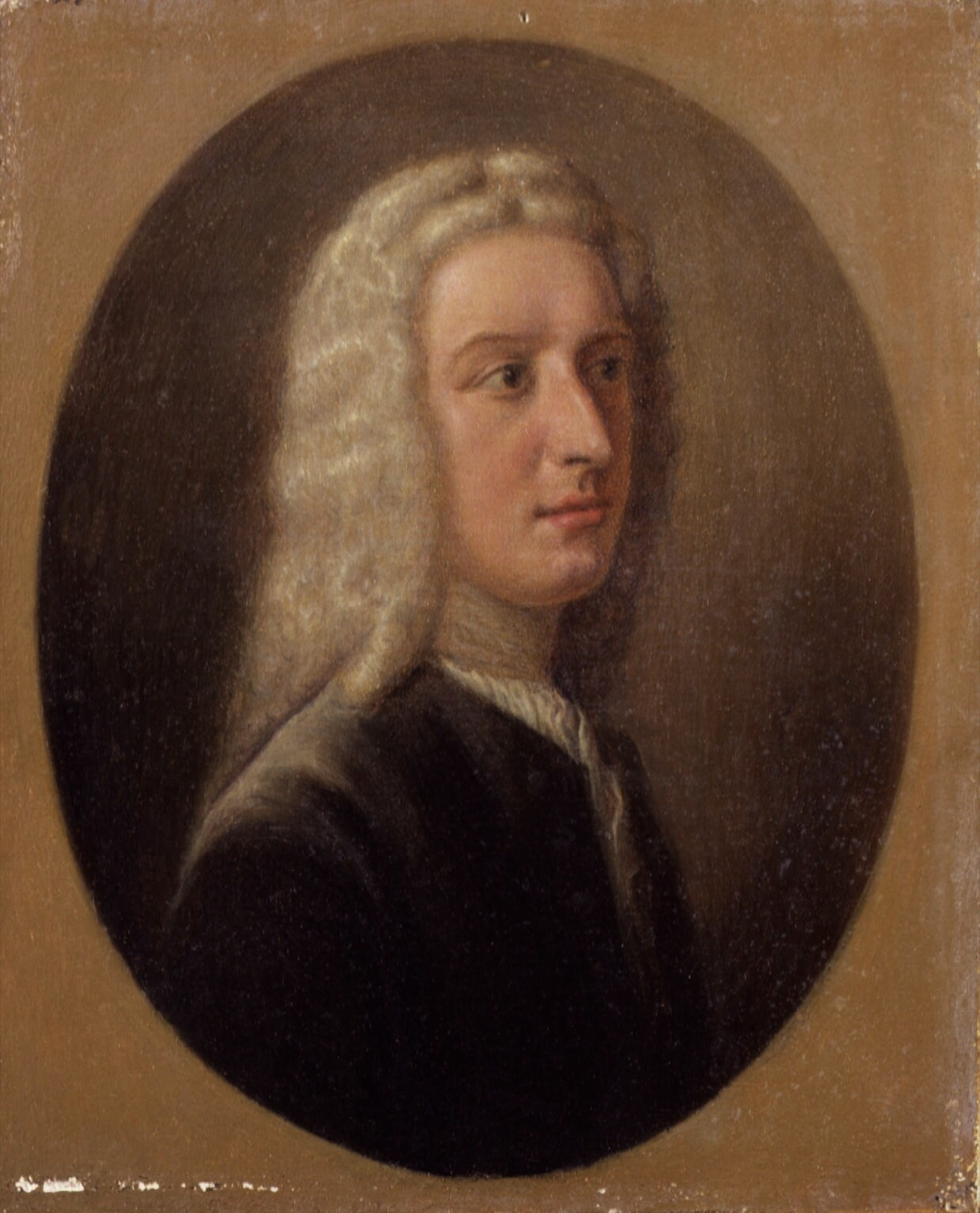
British Army colonel James Oglethorpe served as temporary general and commander in chief of British land forces in South Carolina and Georgia during the War of Jenkins' Ear.

Although permanent promotions to general officer ranks went strictly by seniority, officers could be appointed to temporary higher ranks while commanding geographic theaters or expeditionary forces abroad.

During Queen Anne's War, a major general, Thomas Whetham, was commissioned as general and commander-in-chief of a never-launched expedition to invade Canada in 1709; a brigadier general, John Hill, as general and commander in chief of the regular forces accompanying the fleet on the disastrous Quebec expedition of 1711; and a colonel, Francis Nicholson, as lieutenant general of forces raised in America for the 1711 expedition.

In 1737, the founder of the proprietary colony of Georgia, James Oglethorpe, was appointed colonel of a new regular British Army regiment that he raised in Britain. Commissioned as "General and Commander-in-Chief of all and singular the forces employed and to be employed in the provinces of South Carolina and Georgia in America," he took his regiment to Georgia in 1738 to conduct a series of operations against the Spanish during the War of Jenkins' Ear. Oglethorpe was promoted to the permanent rank of brigadier general in 1743 and returned to England, where he eventually advanced by seniority to the rank of general in 1765.

==== Local rank ====
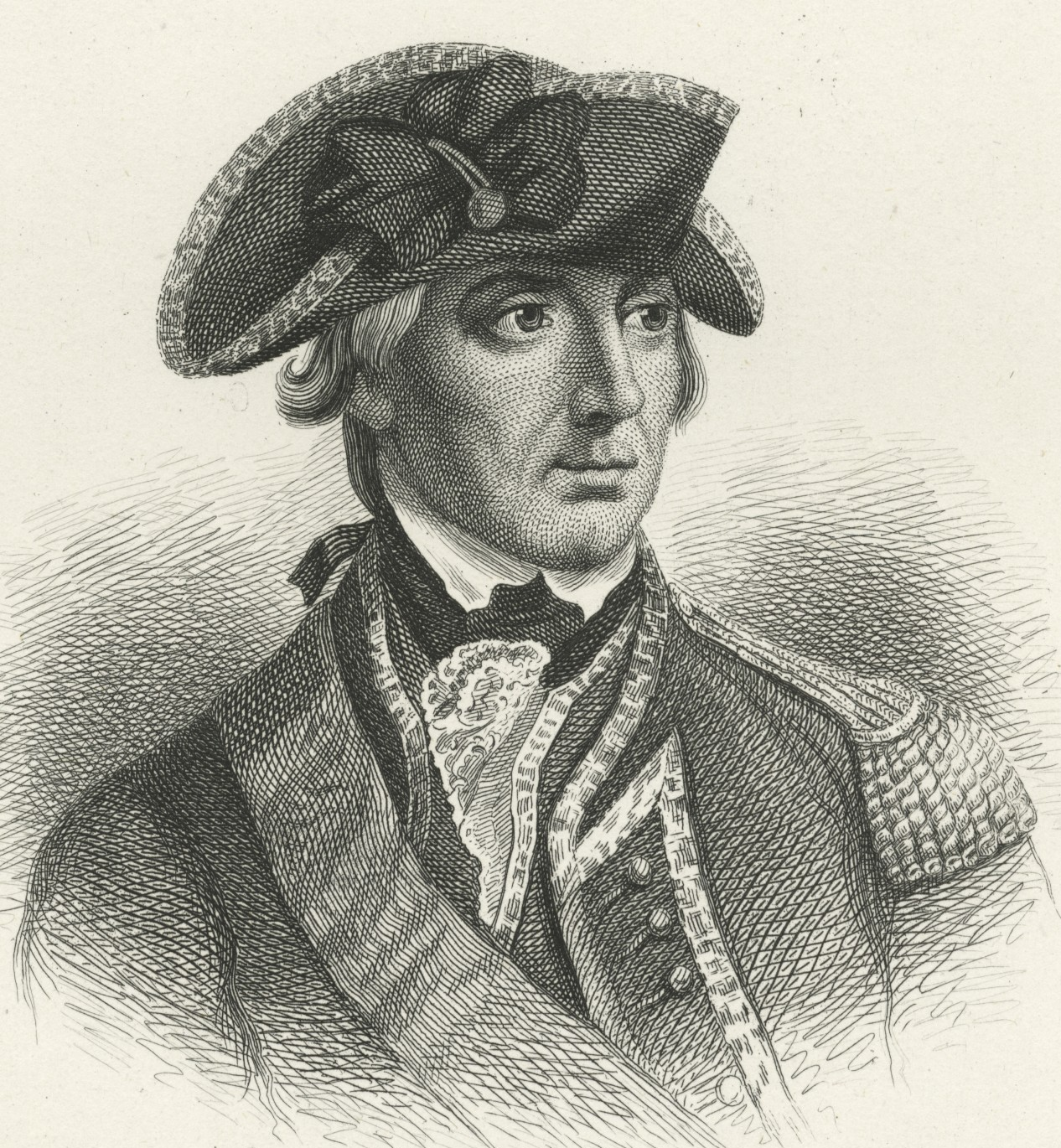
As commander in chief of British land forces in America, British Army major general William Howe held the local rank of general "in America only".

In addition to temporary ranks held while performing a special service, officers could hold local ranks that applied only within a specific geographical theater. Local ranks were introduced during the French and Indian War to prevent British regulars from being outranked by provincial forces in America, and to provide flexibility to dispatch energetic young officers like Jeffrey Amherst and James Wolfe to America as local general officers without passing over their seniors by promoting them substantively in the permanent establishment.

In April 1775, weeks before the battles of Lexington and Concord, the British government sent three junior major generals, William Howe, Henry Clinton, and John Burgoyne, to America to advise and eventually replace its commander-in-chief of land forces in North America, British Army lieutenant general Thomas Gage, in whom it was rapidly losing confidence. To prevent a foreign-born subject from being left in charge of a civil war between British subjects if anything happened to Gage, the government recalled his second in command, Frederick Haldimand, a Swiss-born major general who outranked the senior British-born major general in the theater, Quebec governor Guy Carleton. News of the battle of Bunker Hill triggered Gage's recall to England in October 1775, with command delegated in his absence to Carleton in Quebec and Howe south of Quebec. Gage's command was formally terminated in April 1776 to commission Carleton and Howe as commanders in chief of British land forces in Quebec and America, respectively.

In February 1776, the British government concluded a treaty with the Landgraviate of Hesse-Kassel to augment British troops in America with a corps of Hessian soldiers led by two lieutenant generals who outranked every British general officer in the theater, including Carleton and Howe, who were still major generals. The next month, Carleton and Howe were promoted to the local rank of general in America only, and the four British major generals in the theater (Clinton, Burgoyne, Hugh Percy, and Charles Cornwallis) to the local rank of lieutenant general.

For the Saratoga campaign in 1777, command of the army that invaded New York from Quebec was given to Burgoyne instead of Carleton, nominally to prevent Carleton from superseding Howe if their forces ever joined, since Carleton was senior to Howe. Taking offense, Carleton submitted his resignation in June 1777 but remained commander in chief of Quebec until finally relieved in September 1778 by Haldimand, who was promoted to the local rank of general. Howe submitted his own resignation in October 1777 upon learning that Burgoyne had surrendered his army. Four months later, Clinton was approved to succeed Howe as commander in chief in America, taking command in May 1778 with the local rank of general.

Cornwallis' surrender at the siege of Yorktown in October 1781 largely ended the war. The government accepted Clinton's resignation in February 1782 and issued a commission to New York governor James Robertson, a British major general with the local rank of lieutenant general, to be commander in chief in America pending the arrival of Clinton's designated successor, Carleton, who became the final commander in chief in May.

==== Dormant commission ====
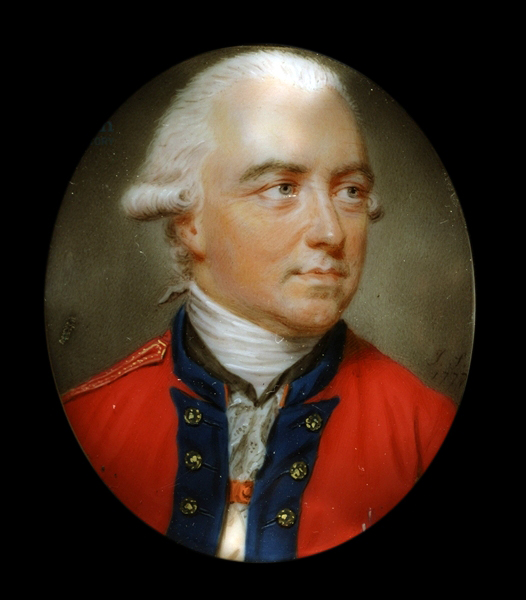
British Army lieutenant general Henry Clinton held a dormant commission for the local rank of general to supersede a more senior Hessian lieutenant general if necessary.

Local ranks also saved British officers from being outranked by senior foreign officers, which had been a problem during the War of the Austrian Succession when British lieutenant general John Ligonier, commander in chief of British forces in Flanders in 1746, found himself outranked in councils of war by allied generals and senior lieutenant generals with much less experience.

To prevent command in America from devolving on a Hessian lieutenant general with an earlier date of rank if the British commander in chief was killed or disabled, the British officers appointed to the local rank of lieutenant general in March 1776 were given dormant commissions to succeed Howe as general and commander in chief in order of seniority, with Clinton first in line as designated successor.

In June 1778, the month after Clinton relieved Howe as commander in chief, Cornwallis arrived from England to be Clinton's second in command with the usual dormant commission to succeed Clinton with the local rank of general, if necessary, but his wife's worsening health caused him to go back to England in November and resign his commission. With no British lieutenant generals left in America, British major general John Vaughan was issued a dormant commission to be general in succession to Clinton, but it was canceled in April 1779 when Cornwallis chose to resume his post in America after the death of his wife.

=== Royal Navy ===
==== Flag officer ranks ====
The Royal Navy had nine flag officer ranks during the colonial period, corresponding to the admiral, vice admiral, and rear admiral of each of the three colored squadrons into which the fleet was notionally partitioned until 1864. Until the mid-1600s, the fleet had three flag officers, with the admiral, vice admiral, and rear admiral of the fleet commanding their own squadrons. From 1653 to 1666, the much larger Commonwealth fleet was divided into Red, White, and Blue Squadrons, each with its own trio of flag officers to command its three divisions, with the admiral of the Red Squadron doubling as admiral and commander in chief of the entire fleet. The nine flag officers were ordered in seniority by squadron: admiral of the Red and commander in chief of the fleet, admiral of the White, admiral of the Blue, vice admiral of the Red, vice admiral of the White, vice admiral of the Blue, rear admiral of the Red, rear admiral of the White, rear admiral of the Blue.

After 1666 the White Squadron was provided by an allied fleet, so there were only flag officers for the Red and Blue Squadrons, with Red senior to Blue. In 1702 the three flag officers of the White Squadron were reinserted between their Red and Blue counterparts when Thomas Herbert, 8th Earl of Pembroke, construed his brief appointment as Lord High Admiral to include the position of admiral of the Red and commander in chief of the fleet, displacing the incumbent admiral of the fleet, George Rooke, who was appointed admiral of the White to maintain his seniority over the admiral of the Blue. However, the White Squadron itself was still a Dutch formation, so the three sets of flag officers formed a pool of commanders for two squadrons. By then, distinction by squadron denoted only personal rank, not operational function, since little effort was made to group flag officers from the same squadron in the same formation at sea.

==== Promotion by seniority ====
By 1718, flag officers were almost always promoted in the order they were appointed to the rank of post-captain, even for ranks above rear admiral, although this was never a formal policy. The Admiralty reserved the right to pass over unqualified senior captains, but tried to find them a consolatory sinecure, pension, or other full-pay employment. Starting in 1747, passed-over captains were superannuated with the half-pay and title of rear admiral without distinction of squadron, or "yellow admiral".

During the War of Jenkins' Ear, global naval commitments forced the expansion of the flag list beyond the traditional nine flag officers, adding four more vice admirals and one rear admiral in December 1743. By the end of the war, blocks of flag officers were being advanced by seniority using the same type of general promotion as in the army. In July 1747, every vice admiral was promoted to admiral, every rear admiral to vice admiral, and seven captains to rear admiral, for a total of 19 flag officers, more than twice the number at the start of the war. However, naval regulations continued to insist that the flag list was capped at nine flag officers as late as 1790, despite the dozens of flag officers then serving. By 1793 there were 17 admirals, 19 vice admirals, 19 rear admirals, and 15 superannuated rear admirals.

==== Relative ranks ====
The ranks of Royal Navy flag officers relative to British Army general officers were defined in 1747 by an Order in Council that ranked the admiral and commander in chief of the fleet with a field marshal, admirals with generals of horse or foot, vice admirals with lieutenant generals, rear admirals with major generals, and commodores with brigadier generals.

In 1776, the Continental Congress established a similar equivalence of ranks between admirals, vice admirals, rear admirals, and commodores in the Continental Navy and generals, lieutenant generals, major generals, and brigadier generals in the Continental Army.

== History (United States) ==
=== Revolutionary War ===
Echoing the British practice of commissioning a senior British Army officer as "general and commander in chief" of the regular forces stationed in America, and each colonial governor as "captain general and commander in chief" of any local forces raised by his province, senior American commanders of the Revolutionary War were likewise commissioned as "general and commander in chief" of the forces raised by their legislatures.

==== Massachusetts militia ====
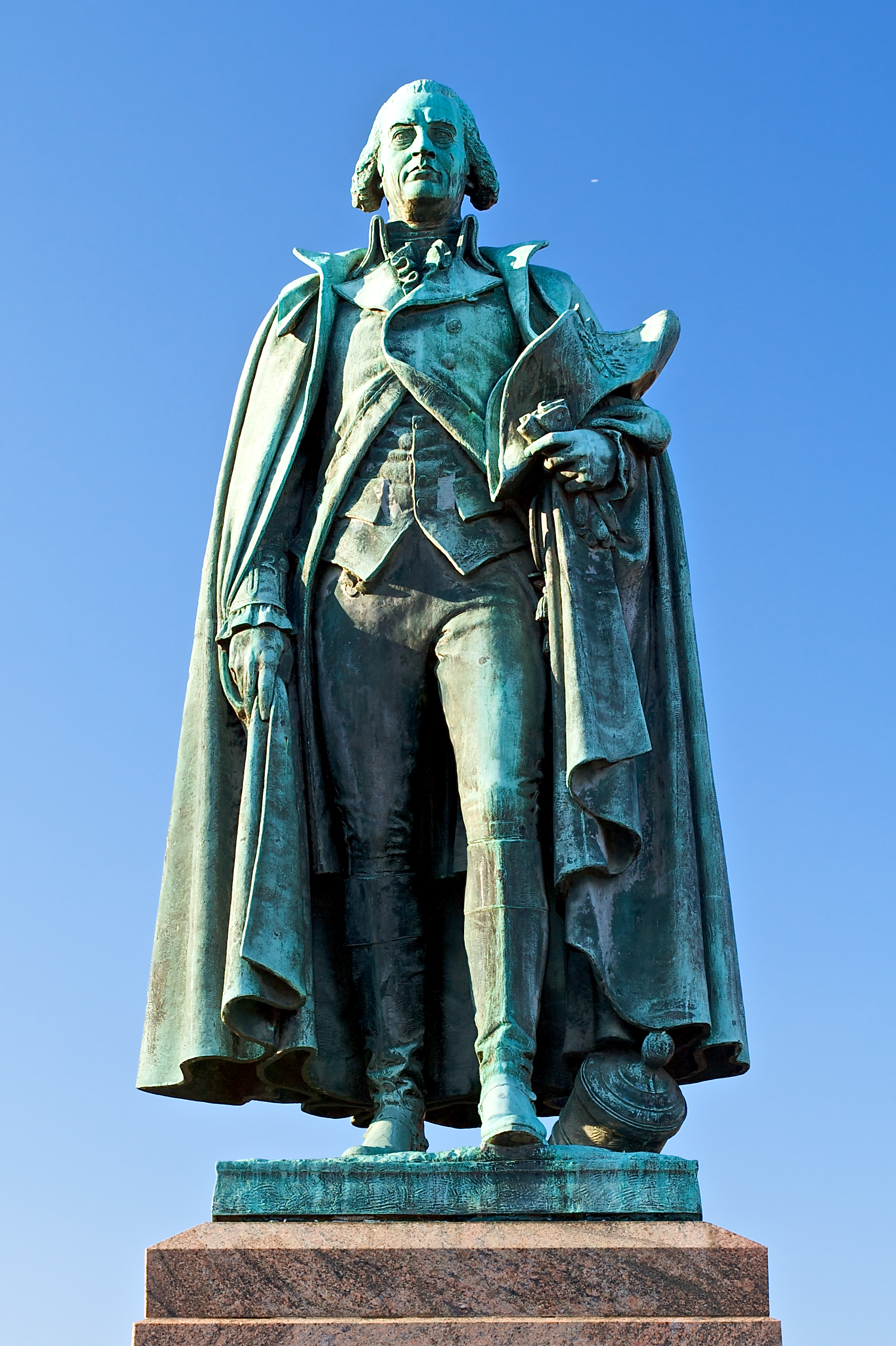
Artemas Ward, general and commander in chief of the Massachusetts militia.

On April 23, 1775, four days after Massachusetts militia units laid siege to Boston following the battles of Lexington and Concord that started the American Revolutionary War, the Massachusetts Provincial Congress formally raised a colonial army headed by the militia's senior general officer, Artemas Ward. As troops from other colonies joined the siege, the Massachusetts Provincial Congress sent a letter on May 16 asking the Continental Congress to take over the American forces. In the meantime, it commissioned Ward as "general and commander in chief" of the Massachusetts forces and John Thomas as lieutenant general, and authorized two major generals and four brigadier generals.

When the Continental Congress took over the provincial forces in June 1775, Ward became the senior major general in the Continental Army and Thomas the senior brigadier general.

==== Continental Army ====
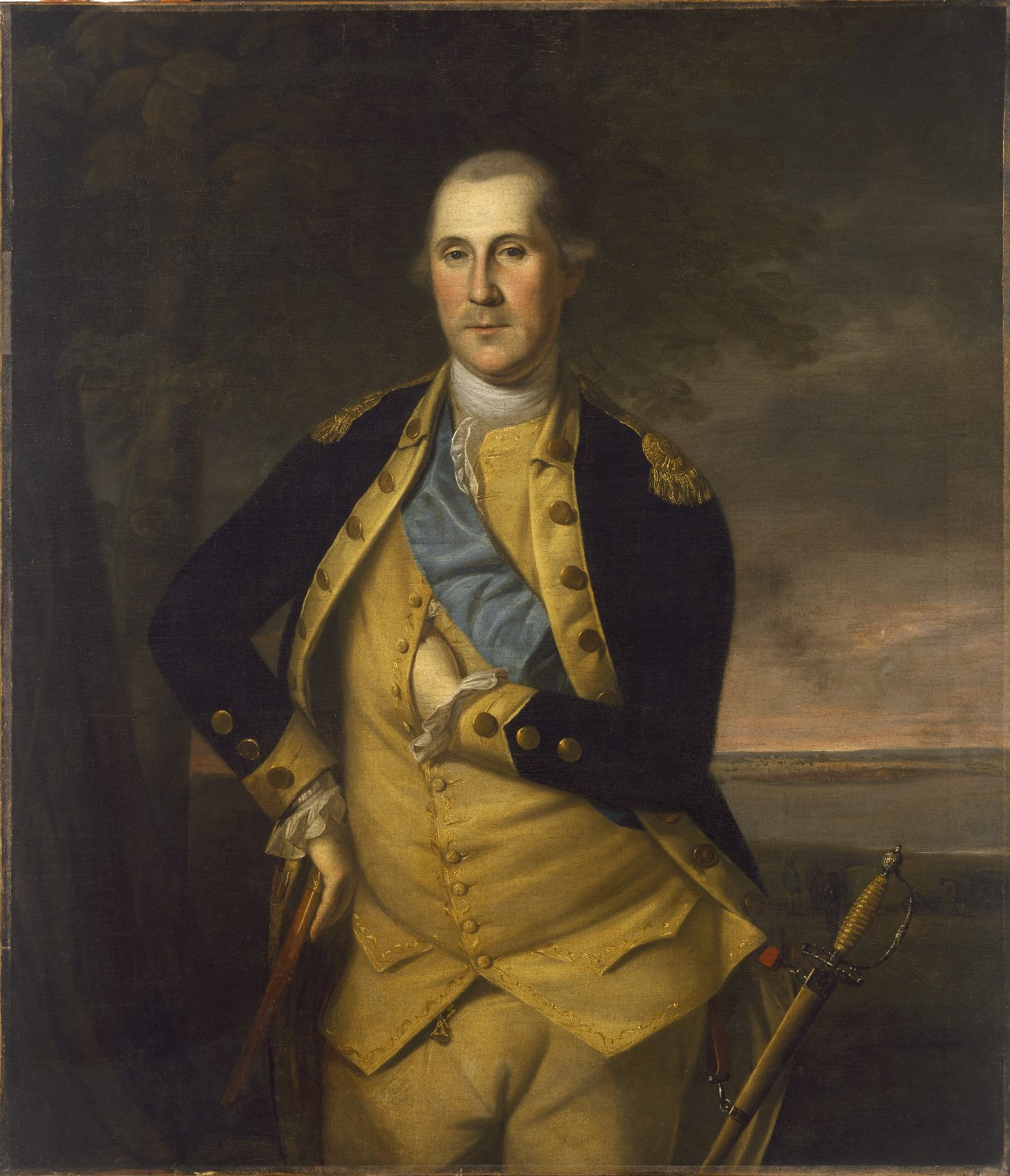
George Washington, general and commander in chief of the Continental Army.

The Second Continental Congress established the Continental Army on June 14, 1775. The next day, it provided that "a General be appointed to command all the continental forces" with $500 (equivalent to $15,568 in 2025) a month for pay and expenses, and unanimously elected George Washington to the post. Washington declined any compensation except reimbursement for his expenses. On June 17, the Continental Congress drafted a commission for Washington to be "General and Commander in chief of the army of the United Colonies", and he received a signed copy dated June 19.

Washington resigned his commission when the war ended in 1783.

==== Continental Navy ====
The Second Continental Congress established the Continental Navy on October 13, 1775, overseen by a committee that, on November 5, selected Rhode Island militia brigadier general Esek Hopkins to command the embryonic fleet being fitted out in Philadelphia. The full Congress approved Hopkins' appointment as commander in chief of the fleet on December 22. Although his title of "Commander in Chief" in the Navy was intended to correspond to Washington's title of "General and Commander in Chief" in the Army, and Hopkins was sometimes addressed as "Admiral" in official communications from the Continental Congress, he received the same $125 monthly pay as a brigadier general, equivalent to a commodore, which is the rank he is usually ascribed.

In November 1776, the Continental Congress defined the naval rank of admiral to be equivalent to Washington's rank of general in the land forces, and above vice admiral, rear admiral, and commodore. However, no further appointments were made to naval ranks above captain after the Continental Congress censured Hopkins in August 1776, suspended him from command in April 1777, and dismissed him entirely in January 1778, and he was never replaced as commander in chief of the fleet.

=== Quasi-War ===
After the Revolutionary War, the Continental Army was disbanded in 1784 and replaced by a much smaller United States Army, whose highest-ranking officer was initially a lieutenant colonel. The last ship in the Continental Navy was sold off in 1785. The Naval Act of 1794 established the United States Navy, which had no flag officers until the eve of the Civil War.

==== General of the Armies ====
In May 1798, Congress authorized the president to augment the permanent regular army by raising a provisional volunteer army whose commander could be commissioned as lieutenant general to command "the armies of the United States" if the Quasi-War with France escalated into full-scale war. It was understood that aging ex-president George Washington would be appointed lieutenant general but largely be a figurehead for his second-in-command, Alexander Hamilton. Washington received a commission to be "Lieutenant General and Commander in Chief of all the Armies raised or to be raised for the Service of the United States", echoing language used by colonial-era commissions.

Congress reorganized the Army in March 1799 and authorized its commander to be commissioned as General of the Armies of the United States, replacing the grade of lieutenant general. However, with the likelihood of a foreign war receding, Hamilton's political rivals, including President John Adams, suspected he was building an army for domestic use to overthrow the government. Senator Theodore Sedgwick assured Adams that Washington's title was simply changing from "lieutenant general" to "general", but Adams retorted, "What, are you going to appoint him general over the President?" Adams declined to appoint Washington to the new grade, and instead sent a diplomatic commission to France to negotiate a peaceful end to the crisis. Washington died later that year, and the grade lapsed when not mentioned in the Military Peace Establishment Act of 1802.

Washington's never-used 1799 grade of General of the Armies was revived in 1866 for Ulysses S. Grant after the Civil War with the title "General of the Army of the United States", and with its original title in 1919 for John J. Pershing after World War I. It was reestablished in 1976 as the highest grade in the Army, past or present, to posthumously promote Washington during the United States Bicentennial celebrations, and he was finally appointed to that grade in 1978.

=== Civil War ===
During the Civil War, the highest rank in the Union Army and Navy was major general and rear admiral until 1864, when the grade of lieutenant general was revived for the general-in-chief, Ulysses S. Grant, and a new grade of vice admiral was filled by David G. Farragut. Grant and Farragut would eventually become the first full general and admiral in the United States military, but not until after the war.

==== Confederate States Army ====
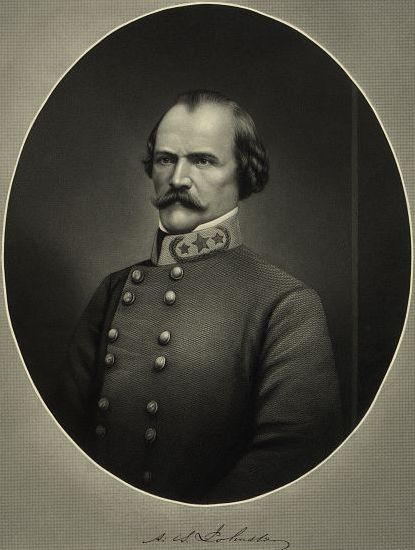
Confederate Army general Albert S. Johnston was the highest-ranking officer on either side killed during the Civil War.

The Confederate States of America authorized 5 brigadier generals in its Regular Army, and elevated them to general in May 1861 with the intent that the Regular Army should have a single general officer grade that outranked all of the brigadier generals and major generals already appointed in the state militias. Grades of brigadier general, major general, and lieutenant general were quickly inserted below general in the Provisional Army of the Confederate States, a volunteer service that augmented the Regular Army.

The first five Regular Army generals were Samuel Cooper, Albert S. Johnston, Robert E. Lee, Joseph E. Johnston, and P. G. T. Beauregard, with a sixth appointment for Braxton Bragg after Albert Johnston was killed at the Battle of Shiloh in April 1862, the highest-ranking officer killed during the war on either side.

The Provisional Army received a full general in February 1864, Edmund K. Smith, to command the Trans-Mississippi Department, and in May was authorized an unlimited number of temporary generals who would revert to their permanent grades at the end of the exigency for which they were appointed. John B. Hood was appointed temporary general in the Provisional Army (though never confirmed by the Confederate Senate) to command the Army of Tennessee in July 1864, and reverted to his permanent grade of lieutenant general upon resigning that command in January 1865.

==== Confederate States Navy ====
The Confederate States Navy was authorized 4 admirals in 1862, to be promoted from captains recognized for gallant or meritorious conduct during the war, but the only admiral appointed was Franklin Buchanan for commanding the ironclad Virginia at the Battle of Hampton Roads. Buchanan received the same grade in the Provisional Navy of the Confederate States when it was organized in 1863.

== Legislation ==
| Legislation | Citation | Summary | Service |
|---|---|---|---|
| Resolution of the Continental Congress, June 15, 1775 | | Authorized 1 general in the Continental Army (George Washington). | CA |
| Resolution of the Continental Congress, November 15, 1776 | | Equated rank of admiral in the Continental Navy to general in the Continental Army. | CN |
| Act of March 3, 1799 | 1 Stat. 752 | Authorized commander of the army of the United States to be commissioned General of the Armies of the United States, replacing the office of lieutenant general [intended for George Washington]. | USA |
| Act of March 16, 1802 [Military Peace Establishment Act] | 2 Stat. 133 | Repealed grade of General of the Armies of the United States [revived in 1866 (14 Stat. 223), 1919 (41 Stat. 283), 1976 (90 Stat. 2078), 2022 (136 Stat. 2611)]. | USA |
| Act of May 16, 1861 (Confederate States of America) | | Authorized 5 generals in the Regular Army of the Confederate States (Samuel Cooper, Albert S. Johnston, Robert E. Lee, Joseph E. Johnston, P. G. T. Beauregard, Braxton Bragg). | CSA |
| Act of April 21, 1862 (Confederate States of America) | | Authorized 4 admirals in the Regular Navy of the Confederate States, to be appointed from the grade of captain for gallant or meritorious conduct during the war (Franklin Buchanan). | CSN |
| Act of May 1, 1863 (Confederate States of America) | | Authorized Regular Navy officers to be appointed admiral in the Provisional Navy of the Confederate States (Franklin Buchanan). | CSN |
| Act of February 17, 1864 (Confederate States of America) | | Authorized 1 general in the Provisional Army of the Confederate States to command the Trans-Mississippi Department (Edmund K. Smith). | CSA |
| Act of May 31, 1864 (Confederate States of America) | | Authorized temporary generals in the Provisional Army of the Confederate States, who revert to their permanent ranks and commands when the temporary exigency expires (John B. Hood). | CSA |

== See also ==
- Legislative history of United States four-star officers
- Legislative history of United States four-star officers, 1866–1898
- Legislative history of United States four-star officers, 1899–1946
- Legislative history of United States four-star officers, 1947–1979
- Legislative history of United States four-star officers, 1980–2016
- Legislative history of United States four-star officers from 2017
