= Arthur Lichte =

United States Air Force general

Arthur J. Lichte
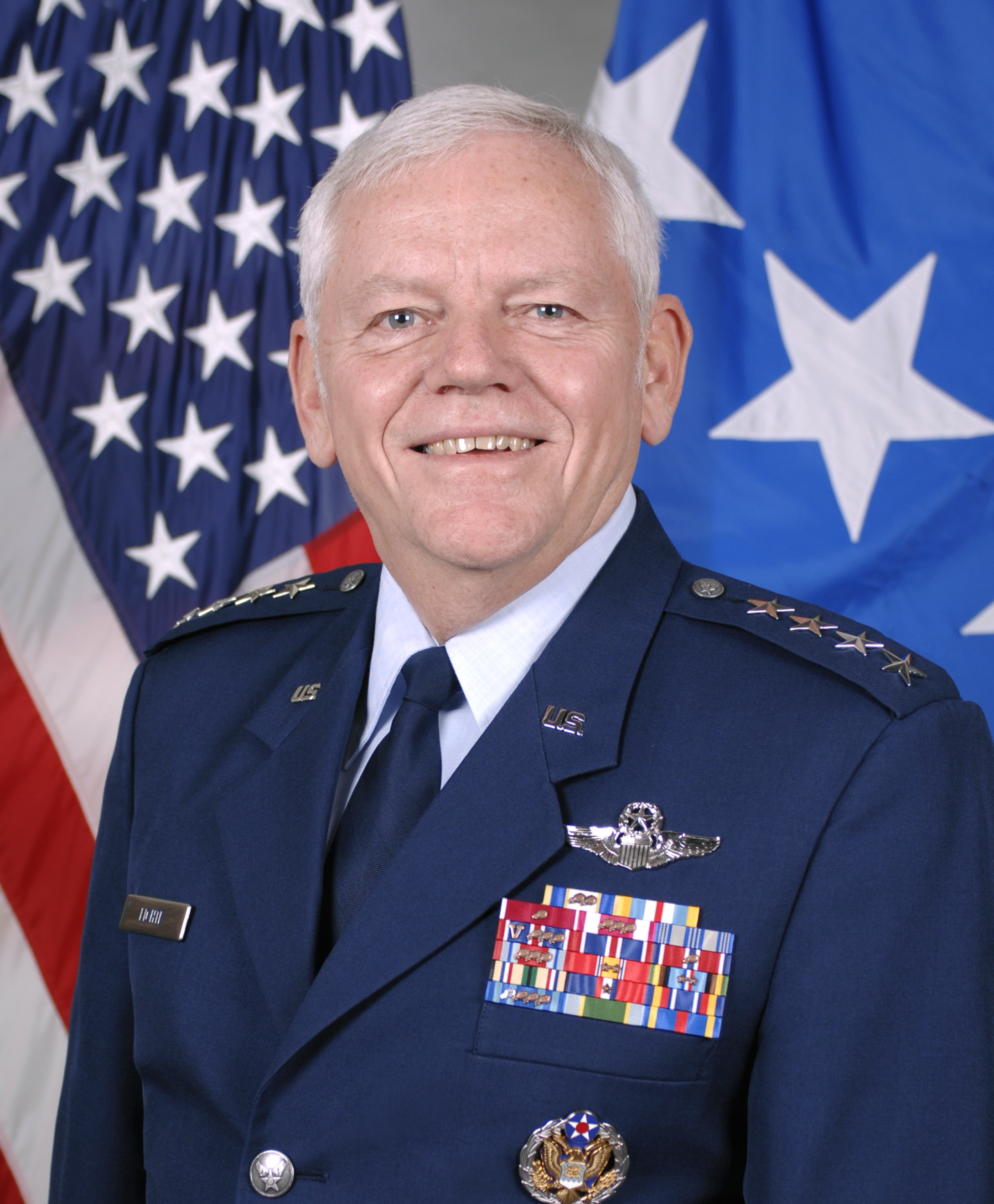
- Lichte as a general in 2008
- Born: April 20, 1949 (age 77); Bronx, New York
- Military career
- Allegiance: United States
- Branch: United States Air Force
- Service years: 1971–2010
- Rank: General (demoted to Major General)
- Commands: Air Mobility Command; 89th Airlift Wing; 92nd Air Refueling Wing; 458th Operations Group; 9th Air Refueling Squadron
- Awards: Air Force Distinguished Service Medal (3); Defense Superior Service Medal; Legion of Merit (2)

Arthur James Lichte (born April 20, 1949) is a former four-star general in the United States Air Force, retroactively retired in the grade of major general.

== Education ==
Lichte was born in The Bronx, New York, where he graduated from Cardinal Spellman High School. He received his Bachelor of Science degree in business administration from Manhattan College, New York City, in 1971 and his master's degree in systems management from University of Southern California in 1978. He attended Squadron Officer School at Maxwell AFB in Alabama in 1978 and the National War College at Fort Lesley J. McNair in Washington, D.C. in 1989.

In 1994 Lichte attended the Program for Senior Officials in National Security at the John F. Kennedy School of Government, Harvard University, Cambridge, Massachusetts. In 2002 he attended the Revolutions in Business Affairs, Naval Postgraduate School, Monterey, California.

== Career ==
Lichte entered the United States Air Force in 1971 as a distinguished graduate of Manhattan College's Air Force ROTC program. During his Air Force career, Lichte held command positions at squadron, group and wing levels. He is a command pilot with more than 4,000 flying hours in various aircraft, including the C-17, C-20, C-21, C-32, C-37, C-130, EC/RC-121, KC-10, KC-135, UH-1N and VC-137. In addition to his command experience, Lichte held headquarters-level assignments at Strategic Air Command, Air Mobility Command, and United States Transportation Command.

Lichte served as Assistant Vice Chief of Staff and Director, Air Force Staff, Headquarters U.S. Air Force, Washington, D.C., where he was responsible for Air Staff organization and administration, served as Deputy Chairman of the Air Force Council, and was the Air Force accreditation official for the Corps of Air Attachés.

Lichte's last military assignment was as the commander of Air Mobility Command based in Scott Air Force Base, Illinois from September 2007 to November 20, 2009. Air Mobility Command's mission is to provide rapid, global mobility and sustainment for America's armed forces. The command also plays a crucial role in providing humanitarian support at home and around the world. The men and women of AMC – active duty, Air National Guard, Air Force Reserve and civilians – provide airlift, aerial refueling, special air mission and aeromedical evacuation for all of America's armed forces.

Lichte retired from the Air Force on January 1, 2010, with over 38 years of military service.

On April 23, 2010, Airbus announced Lichte had joined the board of EADS North America.

== Sexual assault allegations ==
In August 2016, Stars & Stripes revealed that Lichte was the subject of a sexual assault investigation being conducted by the Air Force Office of Special Investigations based on claims by one of his former female subordinates. The case was initially reported by John Q. Public, an independent blog that focuses on the Air Force. The blog said it had obtained an internal Air Force document that described a complaint filed earlier this year by a female colonel that her commander had “used his power to coerce sexual contact” three times between April 2007 and April 2009. The report said the senior officer at one point led Air Mobility Command, which has headquarters at Scott Air Force Base, which is about 20 miles east of St. Louis in Illinois. Linda Card, a spokeswoman for the Air Force's Office of Special Investigations, confirmed the investigation of the allegations against Lichte but would not comment further or provide additional details about the case. On completion of the investigation, Secretary of the Air Force Deborah Lee James, issued a letter of reprimand and initiated a board determination of what grade General Lichte had satisfactorily served in prior to his retirement. On 1 February 2017, it was announced that Lichte was retroactively retired in the grade of major general.

== Assignments ==
1. October 1971 – October 1972, student, undergraduate pilot training, Sheppard AFB, Texas
2. October 1972 – May 1975, EC-121 pilot, 552nd Airborne Early Warning and Control Wing, McClellan AFB, California
3. May 1975 – July 1981, co-pilot, aircraft commander, flight commander, standardization and evaluation aircraft commander, later, KC-135 training flight instructor pilot, 380th Air Refueling Squadron, Plattsburgh AFB, New York
4. July 1981 – July 1985, Assistant Chief, Tanker Resource Management Team; Chief, Tanker Career Management Section; Chief, Operations-Maintenance Squadron Commander Management Branch; Chief, Special Assignments Activity Branch; later, Chief, Selective Assignments Activity Branch, Headquarters SAC, Offutt AFB, Nebraska
5. July 1985 – August 1988, KC-10A flight commander, later, operations officer, later, Commander, 9th Air Refueling Squadron, March AFB, California
6. August 1988 – June 1989, student, National War College, Fort Lesley J. McNair, Washington, D.C.
7. June 1989 – January 1990, Deputy Chief, Strategic Forces Division, Headquarters U.S. Air Force, Washington, D.C.
8. January 1990 – June 1991, executive officer, Deputy Chief of Staff for Programs and Resources, Headquarters U.S. Air Force, Washington, D.C.
9. June 1991 – April 1992, Assistant Deputy Commander for Operations, 2nd Bombardment Wing, Barksdale AFB, Louisiana
10. April 1992 – July 1993, commander of 458th Operations Group, Barksdale AFB, Louisiana
11. July 1993 – July 1995, executive officer to the Commander, USTRANSCOM, and to the Commander, AMC, Scott AFB, Illinois
12. August 1995 – November 1996, Commander, 92nd Air Refueling Wing, Fairchild AFB, Washington
13. November 1996 – January 1999, commander of 89th Airlift Wing, Andrews AFB, Maryland
14. January 1999 – April 2000, Director of Global Reach Programs, Office of the Assistant Secretary of the Air Force for Acquisition, Headquarters U.S. Air Force, Washington, D.C.
15. April 2000 – December 2002, director of plans and programs, Headquarters AMC, Scott AFB, Ill.
16. December 2002 – June 2005, Vice Commander, USAFE, Ramstein AB, Germany
17. July 2005 – August 2007, Assistant Vice Chief of Staff, Headquarters U.S. Air Force, Washington, D.C.
18. September 2007 – November 2009, Commander, Air Mobility Command, Scott AFB, Ill.

== Flight information ==
- Rating: Command pilot
- Flight hours: Over 9,000
- Aircraft flown: C-17, C-20, C-21, C-32, C-37, C-130, EC/RC-121, KC-10, KC-135, UH-1N, VC-137

== Awards and decorations ==
Air Force Command Pilot Badge
Headquarters Air Force Badge

Air Force Distinguished Service Medal with two bronze oak leaf clusters
Defense Superior Service Medal
Legion of Merit with oak leaf cluster
Meritorious Service Medal with three oak leaf clusters
Air Force Achievement Medal
Air Force Outstanding Unit Award with Valor device and three bronze oak leaf clusters
Air Force Outstanding Unit Award (Fifth award requires second ribbon due to accouterment spacing)
Air Force Organizational Excellence Award with oak leaf cluster
Combat Readiness Medal with three bronze oak leaf clusters
National Defense Service Medal with two service stars
Armed Forces Expeditionary Medal with two service stars
Southwest Asia Service Medal
Kosovo Campaign Medal with one service star
Global War on Terrorism Service Medal
Air Force Longevity Service Award with silver and three bronze oak leaf clusters
Small Arms Expert Marksmanship Ribbon
Air Force Training Ribbon
National Order of Merit of France (grade unknown)

- Order of the Sword, Air Mobility Command.

== Effective dates of promotion/demotion ==
- Second Lieutenant May 23, 1971
- First Lieutenant April 3, 1973
- Captain October 3, 1975
- Major August 1, 1983
- Lieutenant Colonel March 1, 1986
- Colonel December 1, 1991
- Brigadier General April 1, 1996
- Major General July 1, 1999
- Lieutenant General January 1, 2003
- General September 7, 2007
- Major General (retired list) February 1, 2017
