= Legislative history of United States four-star officers, 1866–1898 =

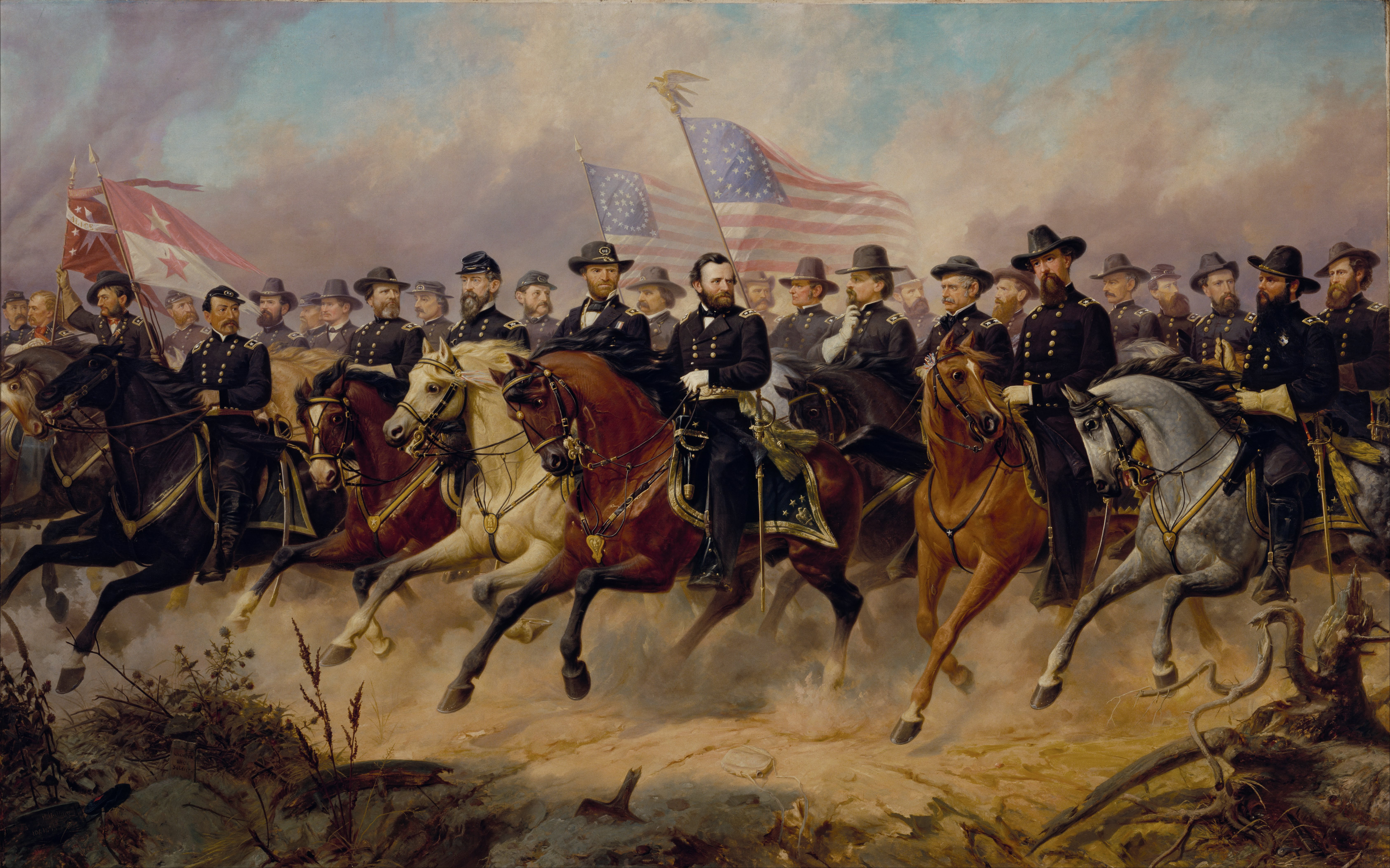
Grant and his Generals (1865) by Ole Peter Hansen Balling. Grant (bay horse, center), Sherman (white horse, center), and Sheridan (black horse, left) are in the foreground.

The four-star grades of general and admiral were created in 1866 to reward the Civil War victories of the senior officers in the Army and Navy, Ulysses S. Grant and David G. Farragut. Grant vacated his commission to become president in 1869 and was succeeded by William Tecumseh Sherman, and Farragut died in 1870 and was succeeded by David D. Porter, after which further promotions to those grades were terminated. The law required all Army officers to retire at age 64, which Sherman did in 1884, but the admiral was exempt from mandatory retirement so Porter stayed on the active list until his death at age 77 after 62 years of service. Congress lifted the ban on further appointments twice, once to reappoint a dying ex-president Grant as general on the retired list in 1885, and once to promote terminally ill lieutenant general Philip Sheridan in 1888.

The deaths of Sherman and Porter abolished both four-star grades in 1891. They would be revived as Admiral of the Navy in 1899 and General of the Armies in 1919.

== History ==
=== Appointment ===
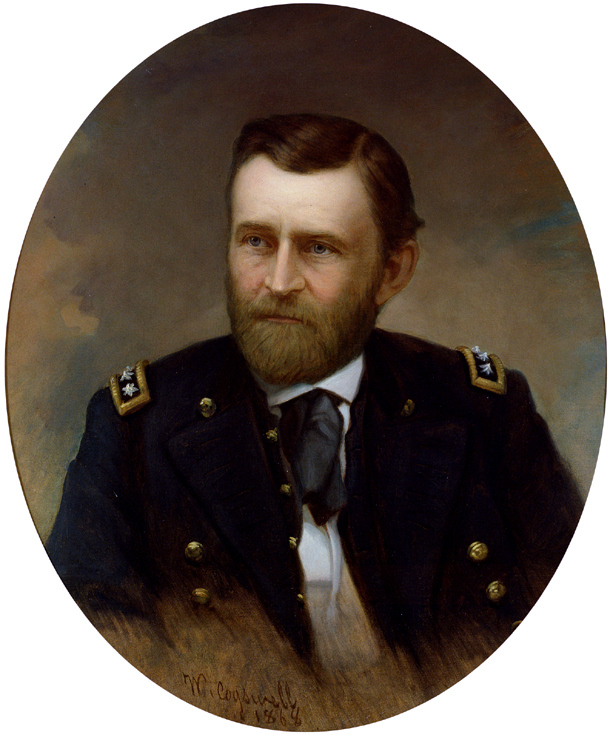
Ulysses S. Grant, first four-star general in the United States Army.

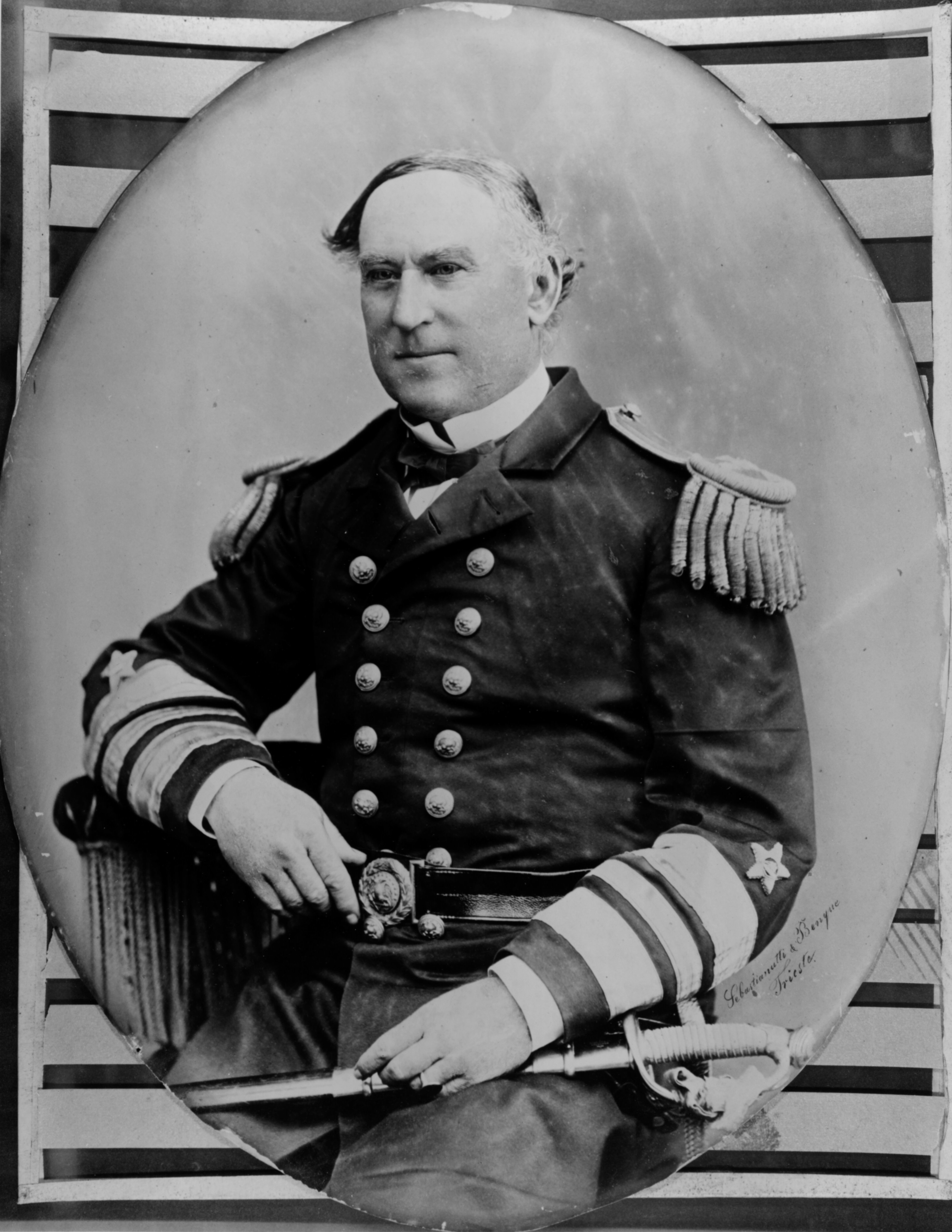
David G. Farragut, first four-star admiral in the United States Navy.

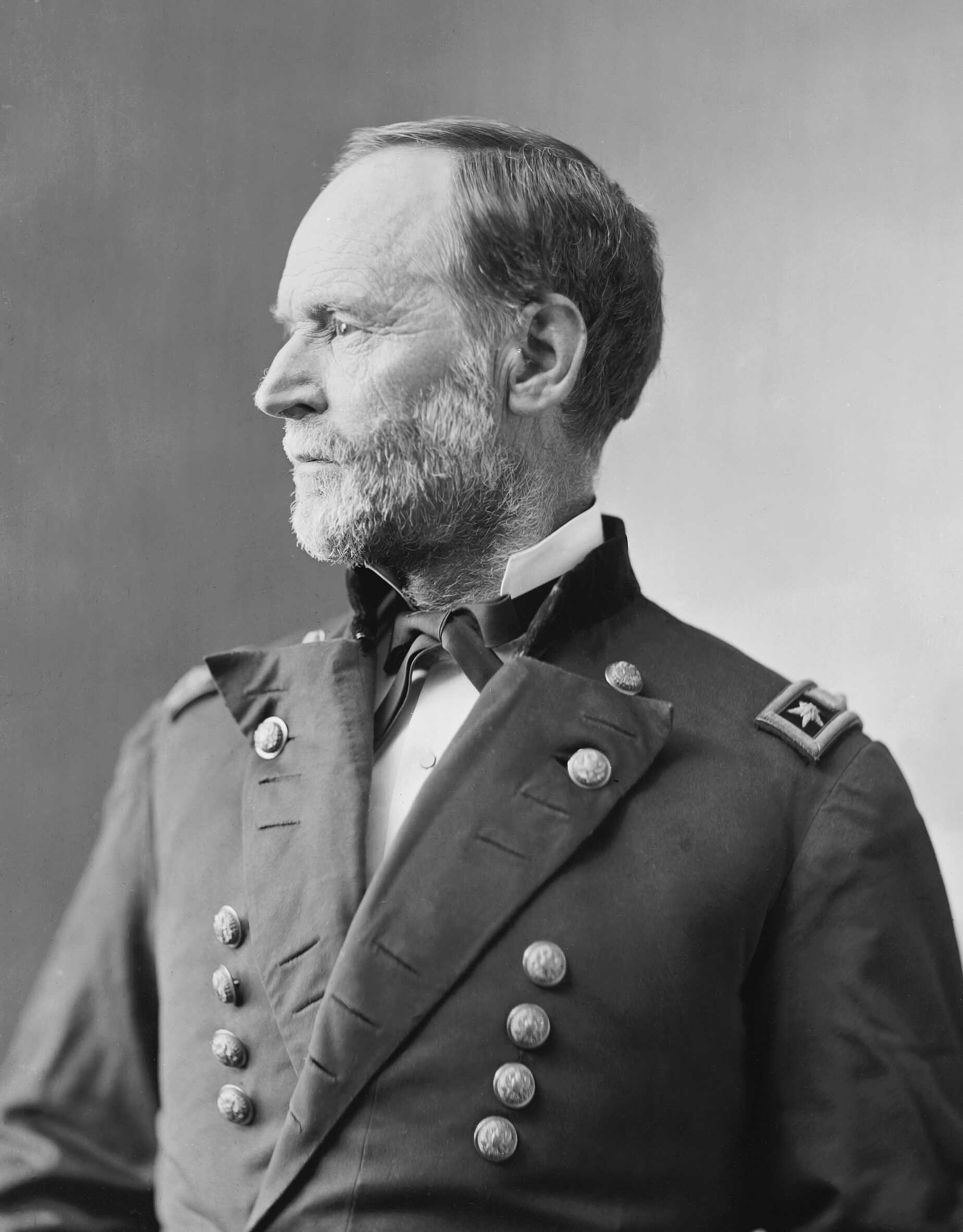
William Tecumseh Sherman, second four-star general in the United States Army.

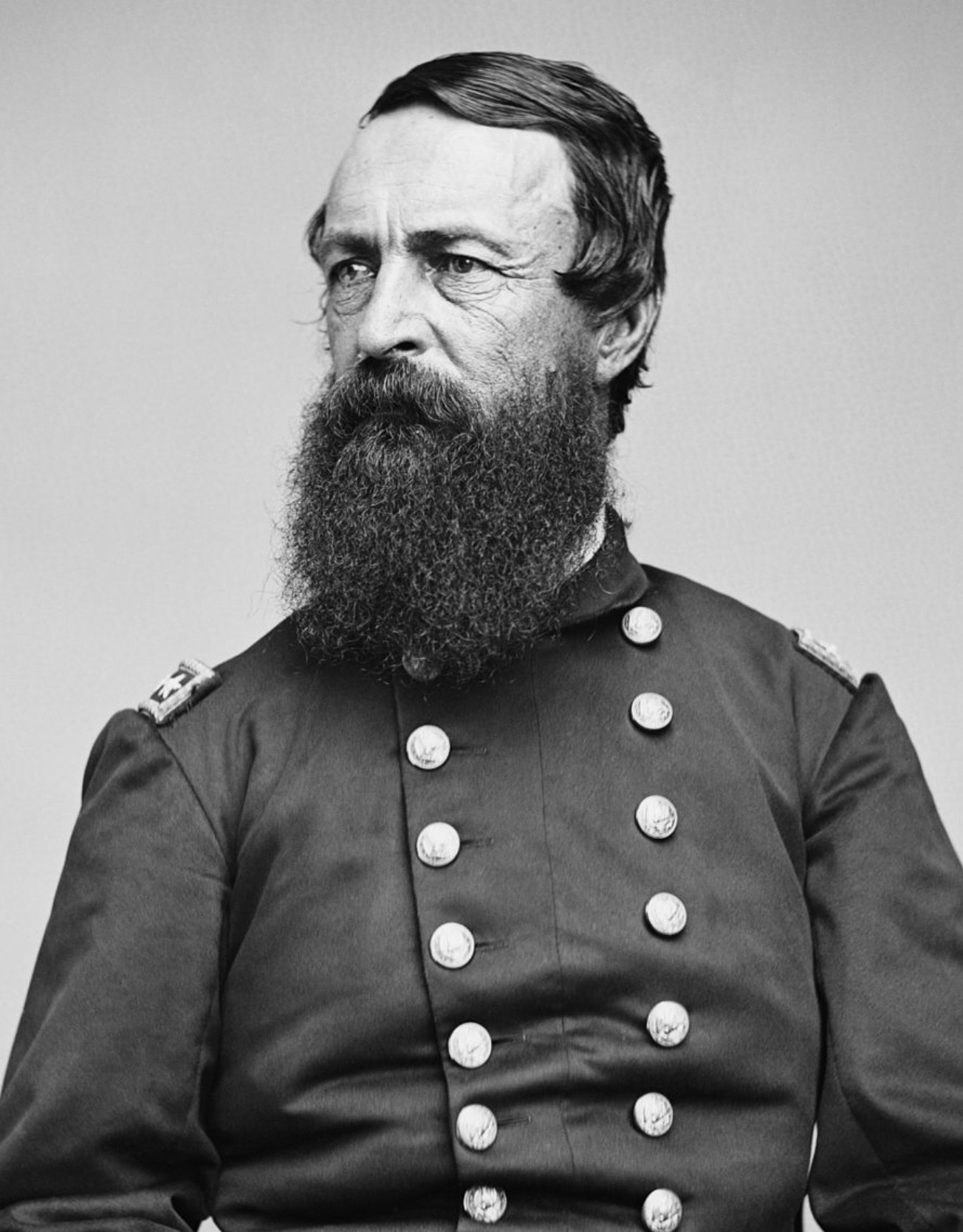
David D. Porter, second four-star admiral in the United States Navy.

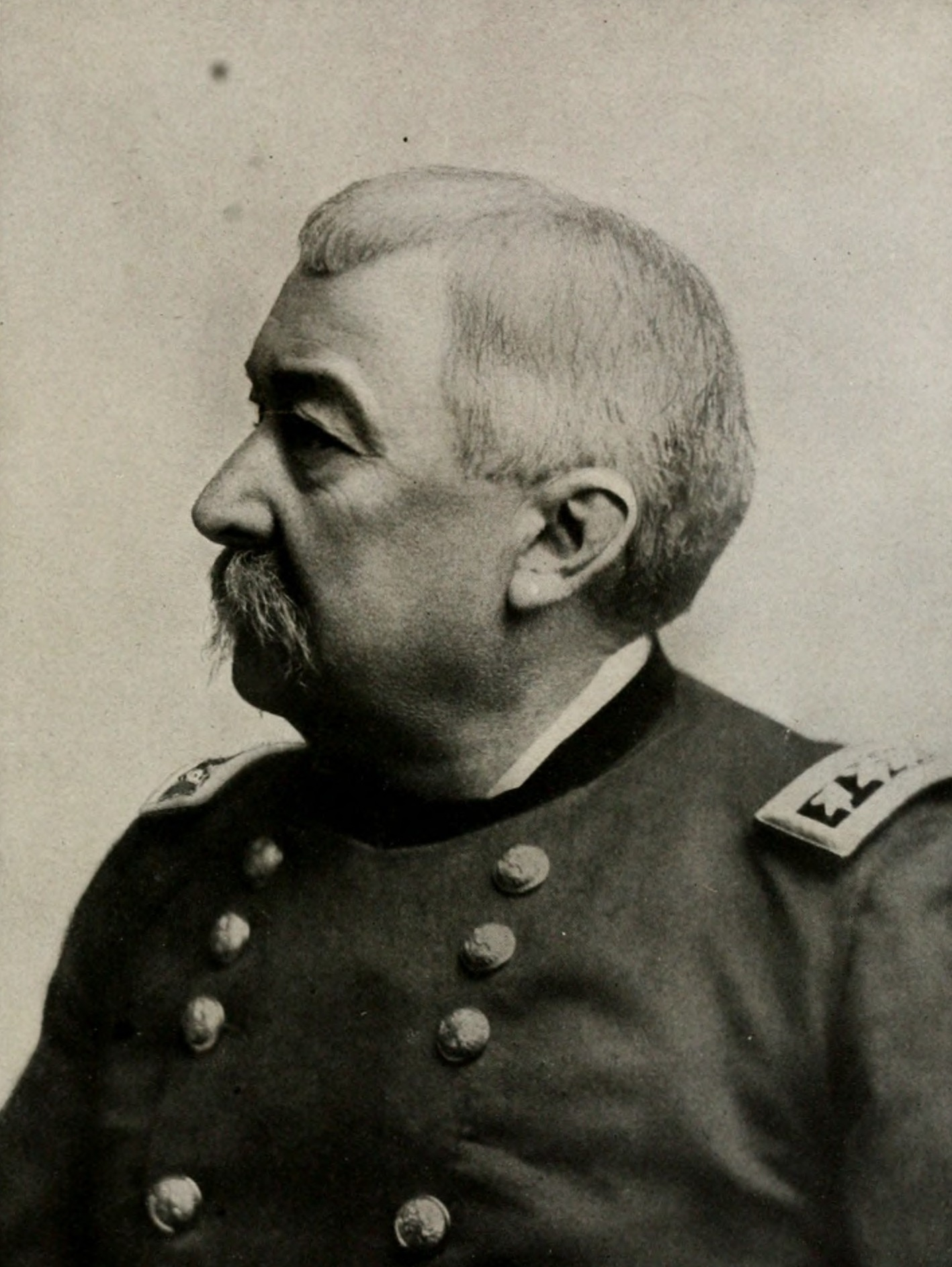
Philip Sheridan, third four-star general in the United States Army.

==== Creation ====
After the Civil War, the victorious general-in-chief of the Union Army, Ulysses S. Grant, and senior officer in the Navy, David G. Farragut, were rewarded with the first four-star promotions in United States history. Four-star officers had previously been appointed in the Continental Army, Confederate States Army, and Confederate States Navy, but never in the United States Army or Navy.

On July 25, 1866, Congress created the grade of admiral in the Navy and revived the grade of General of the Army of the United States that had been created (as "General of the Armies of the United States") for Washington in 1799 but never filled. Since there was only one four-star general in the Army during this period, the grade was referred to interchangeably as "general", "the General", and "the General of the Army", a title not to be confused with the five-star grade of general of the Army created in 1944. Similarly, the Navy's sole four-star admiral was often called "the Admiral of the Navy", a title that would evolve into a higher grade in 1899.

Like the grade of lieutenant general that was revived during the war to make Grant general-in-chief in 1864, the General of the Army was specifically authorized to command the armies of the United States. However, neither the grade of vice admiral created for Farragut in 1864 nor his new grade of admiral included command of the Navy, so unlike Grant, who continued to command the Army from his headquarters in the capital, the Navy's first four-star admiral was relegated to a valedictory cruise with the European Squadron that became his last meaningful assignment.

==== Abolition ====
Grant vacated his commission to become president in March 1869, and promoted the lieutenant general of the Army, William Tecumseh Sherman, to succeed him as general. In July 1870, the Army appropriation bill stopped promotions to the grades of general and lieutenant general, which would be abolished at their next vacancies. Farragut's death a month later created a vacancy in the grade of admiral that could only be filled by promoting the vice admiral, David D. Porter, but Porter had made many enemies during his brief tenure as advisor to Navy secretary Adolph E. Borie the previous year, and the House voted to abolish the grades of admiral and vice admiral before Porter could be promoted. The Senate declined to follow suit and confirmed Porter as admiral, 31 to 10, in January 1871. Congress terminated further promotions to admiral and vice admiral in 1873.

After Sherman retired in February 1884, the ban on new appointments to his grade of general was relaxed twice. In March 1885, Grant was out of office, bankrupt, and dying, so Congress authorized the president to reappoint him to the rank and full pay of general on the retired list. Congress made a similar exception in June 1888 to promote the ailing lieutenant general of the Army, Philip Sheridan, by discontinuing the grade of lieutenant general and merging it with the grade of general until Sheridan's death two months later.

The deaths of Sherman and Porter abolished both four-star grades in 1891. They would be revived as Admiral of the Navy in 1899 and General of the Armies in 1919.

==== Brevet general ====
In addition to the limited number of substantive grades authorized by law, the president could commission as many officers in brevet grades as the Senate would confirm. An officer could be appointed to a brevet grade if no vacancy existed in the corresponding substantive grade, or to outrank officers senior to him in a lower substantive grade, although a substantive commission always outranked a brevet commission in the same grade.

In March 1867, Congress passed the Tenure of Office Act and the Command of the Army Act, requiring prior Senate consent for the President to remove the secretary of war or general of the Army. Defying the law, President Andrew Johnson suspended the secretary of war, Edwin Stanton, while the Senate was out of session in August, and appointed Grant as acting secretary. Upon its return in January 1868, the Senate voted to restore Stanton and Grant immediately relinquished the office, to Johnson's displeasure. Since the Command of the Army Act blocked Johnson from removing or reassigning Grant, he tried to create a rival to Grant of equal rank by establishing a Military Division of the Atlantic, to be based in the capital and commanded by the lieutenant general of the Army, Sherman, whom Johnson nominated to be brevet general. Sherman threatened to resign rather than accept such a post, so Johnson nominated major general George H. Thomas to be brevet lieutenant general and brevet general. When Thomas likewise declined, Johnson appointed the adjutant general of the Army as secretary of war, triggering Congress to impeach the president. The Command of the Army Act was repealed in 1870, by the same bill that terminated further appointments to the grade of general.

Brevet grades were restricted in 1869 to be conferred in time of war for distinguished conduct and public service in presence of the enemy. The last and highest brevet grade was awarded during World War I to Tasker H. Bliss so he could join the Supreme War Council in Versailles, France, as a four-star general by brevet, after he reverted from general to major general upon retiring as Army chief of staff. Though never used again, authorization for Civil War-era brevet grades was not repealed until 1956.

=== Retirement ===
==== Compulsory retirement ====
At the start of the Civil War, the Navy removed senior officers who were too elderly or infirm to command at sea by compelling them to retire at age 62, or after 45 years of service, although being voted the thanks of Congress like Farragut and Porter extended their tenure on the active list to 55 years. The vice admiral was exempted from mandatory retirement when that grade was created in 1864, as was the admiral by the first edition of the Revised Statutes of the United States in 1874, keeping Porter on the active list at full pay until his death in 1891 at age 77 after 62 years of service.

The president was originally authorized but not required to retire Army officers involuntarily at age 62 or 45 years of service. In 1880, President Rutherford B. Hayes elected to retire 62-year-old brigadier general Edward O. C. Ord instead of an older major general, a controversial decision that Sherman blamed publicly on politics. In response, Congress revoked the president's discretion to retain overage officers with an amendment to the 1882 Army appropriation bill that compelled all officers to retire at age 64. The House preferred the same compulsory retirement age of 62 as the Navy, but Sherman was almost at that age so the Senate raised it to 64 and provided that the General of the Army would retire at full pay and allowances ($15,000 a year) instead of the standard three-quarters pay and no allowances ($10,125 a year). The Senate rejected amendments to extend other Navy perquisites to the Army, such as exempting the general and lieutenant general from mandatory retirement like the admiral and vice admiral, or extending the tenure of Army officers who were voted the thanks of Congress during the Civil War. Sherman stepped down as commanding general of the Army in November 1883, and transferred to the retired list upon turning 64 on February 8, 1884, at full pay and allowances.

The special retirement privileges created for Porter and Sherman were inherited by their successors, Admiral of the Navy George Dewey, who died on the active list at age 79, being exempt from mandatory retirement like Porter; and General of the Armies John J. Pershing, who transferred to the retired list at age 64 at full pay and allowances like Sherman.

==== Captain general ====
Former presidents did not receive a government pension until 1953, so when Grant left office there were several attempts to replace the military income he had given up to become president, including suggestions to provide pensions for ex-presidents, appoint them senators for life, or even restore Grant to command of the Army with a new grade of captain general, equivalent to field marshal.

In September 1879, Grant returned to the United States after two and a half years abroad as a frontrunner to be the 1880 Republican Party nominee for an unprecedented third term as president. To entice Grant to resume a nonpartisan military career, political rivals in both parties proposed a new office called Captain General of the Army with an annual salary of $25,000 or $50,000, a lifetime military appointment carrying as much pay as the president and more rank than the General of the Army, Sherman, who threatened to retire if superseded by Grant as commanding general of the Army. Instead, Grant unsuccessfully sought nomination for a third term at the 1880 Republican National Convention and then campaigned vigorously in the November election, entrenching him as a partisan figure. When outgoing president Rutherford B. Hayes asked the lame-duck Democratic Congress in December to recognize Grant's Civil War services by authorizing his appointment as captain general of the Army, the House Military Committee rejected proposals to name him captain general on the active list or general on the retired list. The Senate likewise declined to pass a corresponding bill which not only gave Grant the rank and full pay of a general on the retired list, but let him resume command of the Army in an emergency. A new bill was submitted in December 1881 to merely appoint Grant to the grade of general on the retired list, which passed the Senate in February 1882 but was ignored by the House.

==== Grant reappointment ====
In May 1884, Grant was bankrupted by a Ponzi scheme run by his business partner. To relieve his financial distress, the Senate promptly passed a bill to appoint Grant, by name, to the rank and full pay of general on the retired list. In July, however, President Chester A. Arthur vetoed a similar bill to restore cashiered Civil War general Fitz John Porter to the Army list, claiming that by specifying Porter's name in the bill, Congress infringed on the president's constitutional appointment power. Since Grant's bill had the same problem, the Senate passed a revised version in January 1885 that authorized the president to appoint an unnamed general on the retired list, but Porter's friends on the House Military Committee refused to substitute it for the original bill, trying to force the president to either give up the principle blocking Porter's reinstatement, or else veto Grant's retirement as well. To rescue the president, the full House rejected the first Grant bill on February 16, planning to take up the substitute bill before the end of the session two weeks later.

On March 1, 1885, the New York Times revealed that Grant was terminally ill, creating new urgency to let him die as a general. The House passed the second Grant bill just before the session ended at noon on March 4, and the clock was turned back twenty minutes so the Senate could follow suit. President Arthur signed the bill and nominated Grant as his last official act, and President Grover Cleveland signed Grant's commission as his first official act after nominating his Cabinet members.

Grant's new commission dated from March 4, 1885, rather than his original appointment in July 1866, so he was outranked on the retired list by Sherman, whose commission as general dated from March 1869. Grant retired with the full pay of a general, or $13,500 a year, instead of the standard three-quarters pay of $10,125 a year, but Sherman had retired with full pay plus allowances for a total of $15,000 a year. Grant died on July 23, 1885, four months after being reappointed general.

=== Compensation ===
==== General ====
The annual pay of the general was initially only $4,800, but it was supplemented by allowances for food, housing, fuel, servants, and horses that increased his total compensation to $18,780 a year, second only to the president of the United States. Unlike the president, whose $25,000 annual salary could last at most eight years, with no subsequent pension, the general's rich income was expected to be for life, but Grant had to give it up to become president, a sacrifice that weighed heavily in his mind when deciding whether to run for that office.

In 1870, Congress set the general's annual pay at $13,500, which was intended to be his total compensation, but the Army interpreted the bill to permit allowances raising his total income to $17,700. Congress eliminated all the general's allowances except for housing in 1878, reducing his income to $15,000. Congress rejected repeated proposals to lower the general's annual pay to $10,000 or $12,000 to bring it more in line with other federal officials such as the vice president and all Cabinet members, who received only $8,000, including the secretary of war who was the general's nominal superior.

==== Admiral ====
The admiral's annual pay started at $10,000 but increased to $13,000 in 1870, $500 lower than the general's annual pay. Naval officers' pay was systematically lower than Army officers, reflecting their greater perquisites like prize money, to which Navy personnel had been entitled since 1799 for capturing enemy merchant ships or blockade runners, as well as bounties for capturing or destroying enemy warships. Five percent of such awards were reserved for the commander of the squadron, amounting to $55,403 for Farragut by January 1866, and $90,348 for Porter. After all postwar claims were settled, Farragut collected a total of $140,885 in Civil War prize money, and Porter $125,910, vastly augmenting their salaries as admiral. Prize money was still authorized during the Spanish–American War, when the squadron commander for the 1898 Battle of Manila Bay, George Dewey, was awarded $28,070 in bounty and prize money. Congress finally increased Navy pay to match Army pay in 1899, and abolished prize money.

In 1876, Congress appropriated only enough money to cover about 75 percent of the Navy payroll, forcing Navy secretary George M. Robeson to furlough almost a third of all line officers at half pay, including Porter, who had been on special duty with no real responsibilities since falling out with Robeson in 1870. Porter appealed his furlough to President Grant, who reversed it.

== Legislation ==
Legislation	Citation	Summary	Service
Act of July 25, 1866	14 Stat. 222	Authorized one grade of admiral (David G. Farragut, David D. Porter).; Set annual pay of admiral at $10,000.	USN
Act of July 25, 1866	14 Stat. 223	Revived grade of general of the army of the United States, to be selected from officers most distinguished for courage, skill, and ability, and authorized to command the armies of the United States (Ulysses S. Grant, William T. Sherman).; Set annual pay of general at $4,800, plus allowances.	USA
Act of March 2, 1867 [Command of the Army Act]	14 Stat. 486	Required prior Senate consent to remove, suspend, or reassign the general of the army, except at his own request [repealed in 1870 (16 Stat. 319)].	USA
Act of March 2, 1867	14 Stat. 515	Changed ranking officer of the Navy from vice admiral to admiral.	USN
Act of March 2, 1867	14 Stat. 517	Authorized brevet ranks to be conferred in the Regular Army for gallant, meritorious, or faithful conduct in the volunteer service prior to appointment in the Regular Army (William T. Sherman, George H. Thomas declined nominations).	USA
Act of March 30, 1868	15 Stat. 58	Banned Army and Navy officers from accepting diplomatic or consular appointments without resigning their commissions [repealed for retired Navy officers in 1929 (45 Stat. 1482)].	USA, USN
Act of March 1, 1869	15 Stat. 281	Authorized brevet ranks to be conferred only in time of war, for distinguished conduct and public service in presence of the enemy (Tasker H. Bliss) [repealed in 1956 (70A Stat. 642)].	USA
Act of July 15, 1870	16 Stat. 318; 16 Stat. 319; 16 Stat. 320	Terminated office of general of the army at next vacancy.; Set annual pay of general at $13,500.; Banned Army officers on the active list from holding civil office without resigning their commissions.	USA
Act of July 15, 1870	16 Stat. 330	Set annual pay of admiral at $13,000.	USN
Act of January 24, 1873	17 Stat. 418	Terminated grade of admiral at next vacancy.	USN
Act of June 20, 1874	13 Stat. 113	Exempted admiral from mandatory retirement for age or years of service (David D. Porter) [codification of Revised Statutes construed exemption for vice admiral as applying to admiral (R.S. 1444)].	USN
Act of June 18, 1878	20 Stat. 150	Eliminated all allowances for the General except a $1,500 annual commutation for quarters (William T. Sherman, Philip H. Sheridan).	USA
Act of June 30, 1882	22 Stat. 118	Set mandatory retirement age at 64 for Army officers.; Authorized General of the Army to retire with no reduction in current pay or allowances (William T. Sherman, John J. Pershing).	USA
Act of March 3, 1885	23 Stat. 434	Authorized on the retired list the rank and full pay of General or General-in-Chief for one person who served as General commanding the armies of the United States or General-in-Chief (Ulysses S. Grant).	USA
Act of June 1, 1888	25 Stat. 165	Discontinued grade of Lieutenant-General of the Army and merged it into grade of General of the Army of the United States for the lifetime of the current Lieutenant-General of the Army (Philip H. Sheridan).; Authorized one appointment to the grade of General of the Army of the United States (Philip H. Sheridan).	USA

== See also ==
- Legislative history of United States four-star officers
- Legislative history of United States four-star officers until 1865
- Legislative history of United States four-star officers, 1899–1946
- Legislative history of United States four-star officers, 1947–1979
- Legislative history of United States four-star officers, 1980–2016
- Legislative history of United States four-star officers from 2017
