= Legislative history of United States four-star officers, 1899–1946 =

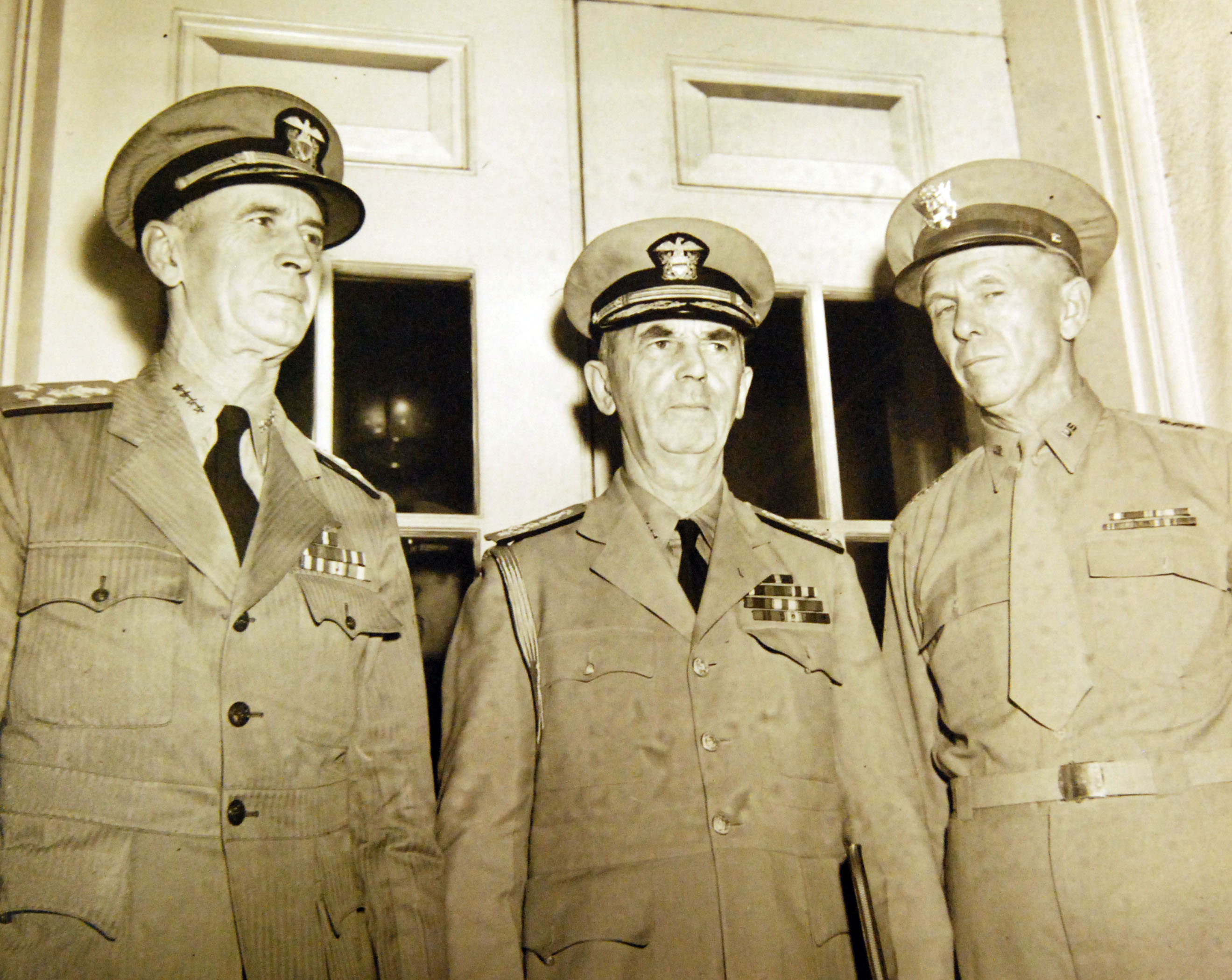
Admirals Ernest J. King, William D. Leahy, and General George C. Marshall at the White House, 1942.

From 1899, when the Navy's Civil War-era four-star grade was recreated after the Spanish-American War, through 1947, when the Officer Personnel Act defined the post-World War II military establishment, four-star grades evolved along two parallel tracks, one decorative and one functional.

Decorative four-star grades were permanent personal promotions that rewarded exceptional field commanders after a war. Such promotions included full active-duty pay and allowances for life, and were awarded after the Spanish-American War to George Dewey, with the title Admiral of the Navy; after World War I to John J. Pershing, with the title General of the Armies; and after World War II to one temporary four-star officer in every armed service. Purely ornamental, they were meant to recognize past accomplishments, not to help perform current or future jobs.

Functional four-star grades were temporary boosts in rank held ex officio while serving in specific jobs, or as a personal grade during a wartime emergency. Upon leaving an office designated to carry four-star rank, or at the end of the war that authorized emergency or temporary four-star grades, an officer reverted to his permanent grade on the active list, although he was typically restored to four-star rank on the retired list if he lived long enough.

Modern four-star grades are descended from the functional grades that were first created in the Navy in 1915, not the Civil War-era decorative grades, and continue to work in substantially the same way, as codified by the Officer Personnel Act of 1947 and its successor, the Defense Officer Personnel Management Act of 1980.

== History ==
=== Appointment ===
==== Admiral of the Navy ====
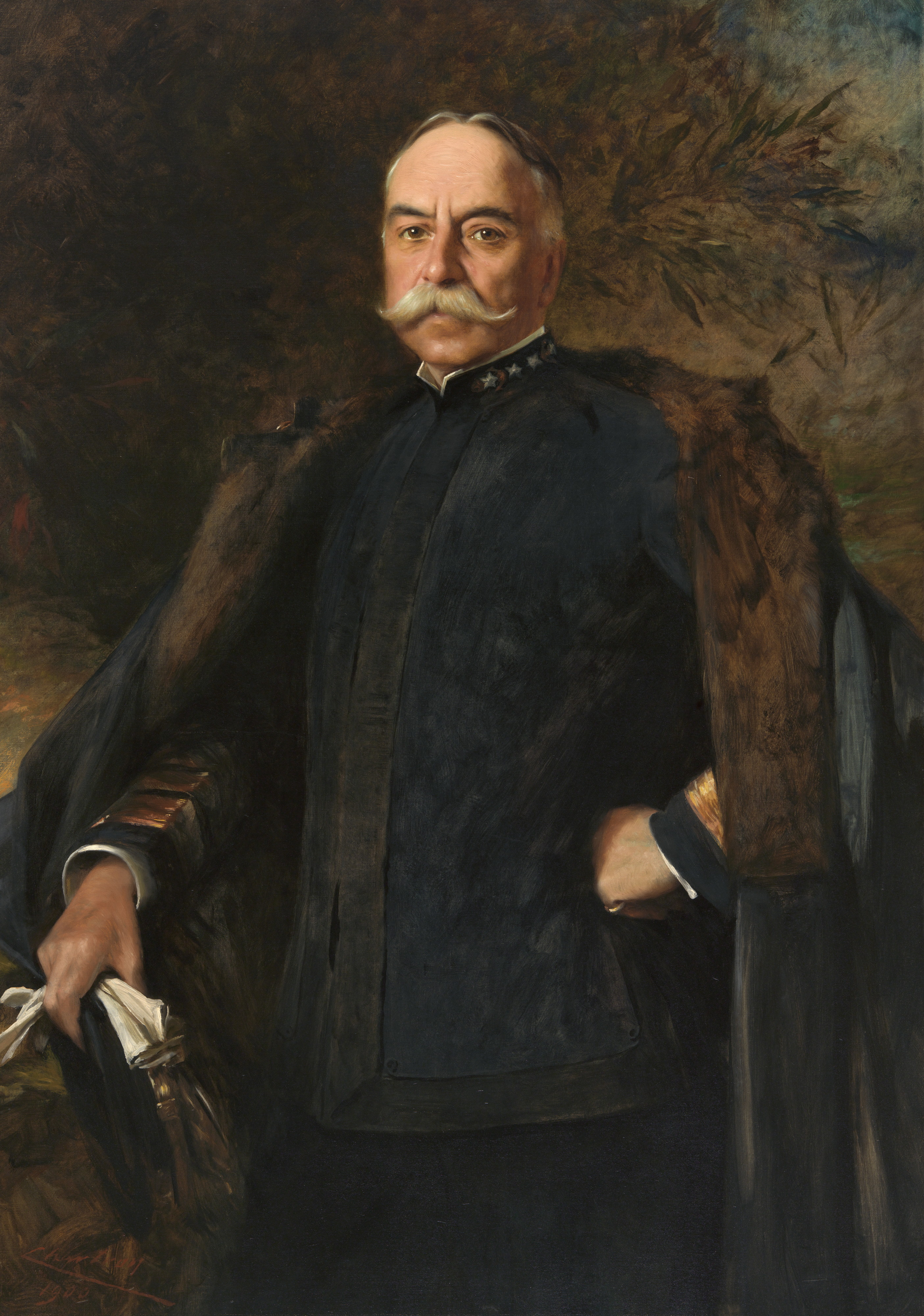
George Dewey, third four-star admiral in the United States Navy, whose unique grade of Admiral of the Navy evolved during his lifetime to rank higher than four-star admiral.

In November 1898, Navy secretary John D. Long asked Congress to revive the grades of admiral and vice admiral to reward the triumphant naval commanders of the Spanish-American War. It was widely acknowledged that George Dewey's victory at the Battle of Manila Bay had earned him Farragut's grade of admiral, but the grade of vice admiral became mired in the so-called Sampson-Schley controversy, the public feud between William T. Sampson and Winfield S. Schley over who deserved credit for winning the Battle of Santiago de Cuba.

The House Naval Affairs Committee reported a bill authorizing a single appointment in each grade, intended to be Dewey and Sampson, and a competing bill in the Senate would have revived both grades permanently. Since Dewey would reach statutory retirement age in less than a year, the House bill also continued him on active duty until he completed fifty-five years of service, a privilege previously extended to senior naval officers who were personally voted the Thanks of Congress during the Civil War.

By February, the bill was still stalled by Sampson-Schley partisans fighting over the vice admiralcy, so Dewey's promotion was repackaged as a standalone bill that simply authorized the appointment of an Admiral of the Navy who could remain on active duty until he asked to retire. The new bill passed easily on March 2, 1899. The next day, Congress passed a Navy personnel law that implicitly abolished the grade by not including the Admiral of the Navy in its list of active-duty line officers, so the identical text to authorize the grade was inserted in the annual naval appropriation bill, which passed later that day and assigned the grade the same annual pay of $13,500 given to the General of the Army in 1870.

Although titled "Admiral of the Navy" instead of "admiral", Dewey held the same grade as Farragut and Porter, who had also been called the Admiral of the Navy during their respective tenures as the only admiral in the Navy. The Comptroller of the Treasury ruled in 1900 that the grade of Admiral of the Navy revived the 1866 grade of admiral and therefore ranked with Sheridan's grade, which had the analogous title of "General of the Army of the United States". The Supreme Court interpreted Dewey's grade the same way in 1912. Dewey even mistakenly received a commission as admiral in the Navy in 1899, and had to be renominated as Admiral of the Navy four years later to correct it. Press reports speculated that the correction had to be made because an Admiral of the Navy was actually equivalent to an admiral of the fleet, but Dewey himself defined his rank as admiral when comparing United States Navy flag grades with those of other nations in 1906.

By 1912, Navy officials were calling Dewey's grade equivalent to an admiral of the fleet, one rank higher than Farragut and Porter, as they lobbied Congress to permanently reestablish three- and four-star grades for peacetime use. However, Navy regulations continued to rank the Admiral of the Navy with a general in the Army until 1915, when the reestablished grades of admiral and vice admiral were inserted below the Admiral of the Navy, whose salute was increased to 19 guns from the 17 guns of an admiral or general. The annual pay of a 1915 admiral was only $10,000, while the Admiral of the Navy received $13,500, further distinguishing the two grades. By 1916, Dewey's office had even acquired the definite article—The Admiral of the Navy, who was senior to all other admirals in the Navy—following the precedent set by the Army in 1907 when Congress gave the top officer in the Adjutant General's Department the title of The Adjutant General, who was senior to all other adjutants general in the Army.

==== Designated admirals ====
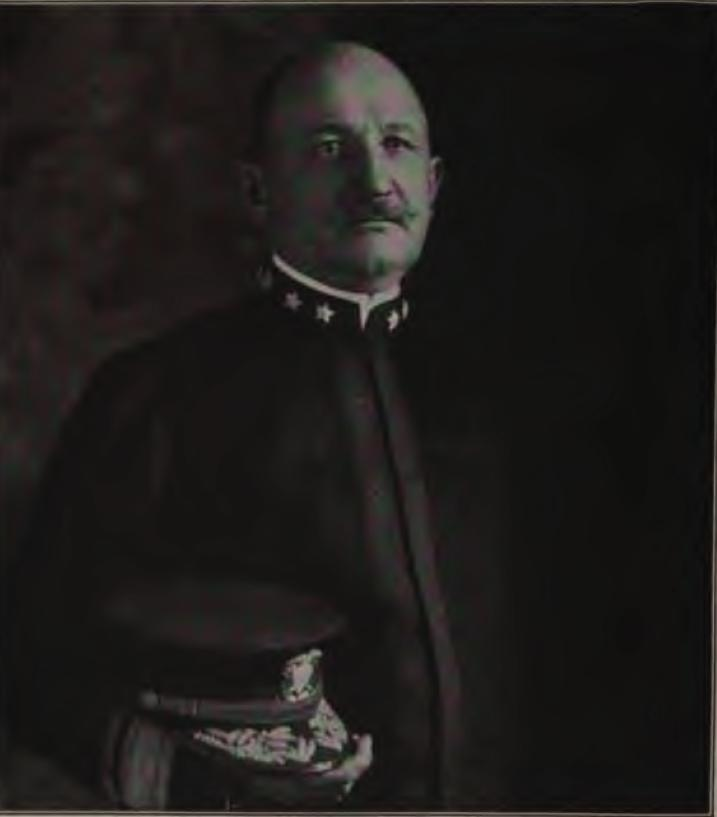
Walter C. Cowles, sixth four-star admiral in the United States Navy, and first to revert to rear admiral upon leaving an office designated to carry four-star rank.

Congress had always held that three- and four-star promotions were meant to reward conspicuous service in time of war, not routine peacetime assignments, and ignored decades of Navy pleas to revive the grades of admiral and vice admiral to keep overseas commanders from being outranked by foreign flag officers commanding smaller forces. By 1911, a compromise had emerged whereby permanent promotions to admiral would still be reserved for war heroes like Dewey, but a rear admiral could be designated to hold temporary four-star rank while commanding a fleet and then revert to his permanent two-star grade. In 1912, an amendment was introduced to reestablish the grade of admiral on this ex officio basis for the commanders in chief of the Atlantic and Pacific Fleets, but it failed on a point of order. A second attempt, motivated by an incident where a British rear admiral had outranked the American commander during the Tampico Affair, also failed in early 1914.

Finally, in January 1915, the House Naval Affairs Committee reported a bill to create three admirals and three vice admirals, on the grounds that the fleet was now large enough to employ them. Officers were not actually promoted to those grades, but remained rear admirals temporarily designated by the President to have the rank and pay of an admiral or vice admiral while assigned as commander in chief or second in command of the Atlantic Fleet, Pacific Fleet, or Asiatic Fleet. They therefore did not need Senate confirmation but also could not retire in that grade or, later, base a tombstone promotion on it. The law passed on March 3, 1915, and Frank F. Fletcher, Thomas B. Howard, and Walter C. Cowles, commanders in chief of the Atlantic, Pacific, and Asiatic Fleets, respectively, were designated as admirals on March 10, 11, and 12, establishing their relative seniority. Four months later, Cowles became the first admiral to revert to rear admiral when he turned over command of the Asiatic Fleet and retired on July 10.

When the United States entered World War I in 1917, Congress relaxed the law to let the President designate as admiral any three commanders of fleets or subdivisions of fleets, not just the commanders in chief of the Atlantic, Pacific, and Asiatic Fleets, which allowed a four-star designation to be transferred from the Asiatic Fleet to the commander of naval forces in Europe, William S. Sims, in December 1918. A fourth admiral designation had been authorized in 1916 for the chief of naval operations, William S. Benson, so he would outrank the four-star fleet commanders he was directing.

==== Emergency generals ====
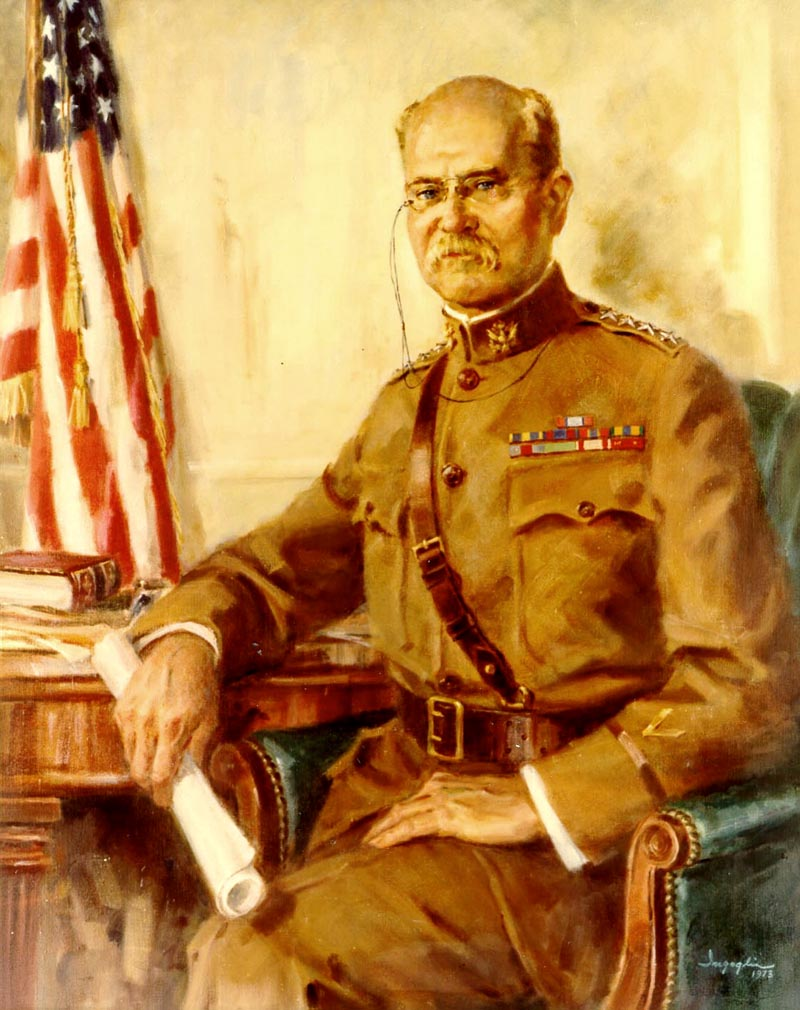
Tasker H. Bliss, fourth four-star general in the United States Army, who received a brevet promotion to general to keep his four-star rank after retiring as Army chief of staff.

Four-star grades reappeared in the Army in October 1917, when Congress authorized the chief of staff of the Army, Tasker H. Bliss, and the commander of the American Expeditionary Forces (AEF) in France, John J. Pershing, to hold the ex officio grades of general during the wartime emergency. The emergency generals of 1917 had the same annual pay of $10,000 as the designated admirals of 1915, as opposed to the $13,500 paid to the permanent generals of 1866, but were entitled to other privileges of an 1866 general such as the right to appoint aides with the rank and pay of a colonel of cavalry. The Comptroller General ruled in 1920 that the emergency four-star grade was a different office than the 1866 grade that was revived for Pershing in 1919.

Like a designated admiral, an emergency general's four-star rank was attached to his position, not his person, so when Bliss reached mandatory retirement age at the end of 1917, he reverted to his permanent grade of major general and was succeeded as emergency general and chief of staff by Peyton C. March. Because Bliss still needed four-star rank to serve alongside full generals from allied nations in his next assignment as United States permanent military representative to the Supreme War Council, he was reappointed emergency general by brevet, the last and highest brevet promotion awarded in the United States military.

All emergency grades expired at the end of the war, so in July 1919, eight months after the armistice, President Woodrow Wilson asked Congress to reward March and Pershing by making them both permanent generals, with Pershing senior to March. The House Military Affairs Committee reported out separate bills to promote Pershing and March to General of the Armies of the United States, reviving the grade originally created for Washington in 1799 and subsequently awarded to Grant, Sherman, and Sheridan as "General of the Army of the United States". To ensure that Pershing would outrank March, Pershing's bill also repealed the 1917 law that made the Army chief of staff senior to all other Army officers. March had made enemies in Congress during the war, so his bill did not pass and he reverted to major general when his emergency grade expired on June 30, 1920.

Wilson also asked Congress to recognize the Navy's contribution to the war by promoting Benson and Sims to permanent admiral. In September 1919, the House passed a bill to make Benson and Sims permanent admirals with the same pay and seniority over other admirals as an Admiral of the Navy, but it died in the Senate, which wanted Benson, Sims, and retired Atlantic Fleet commander Henry T. Mayo to be permanent vice admirals instead. By February 1920, a public brawl between Sims and the Navy Department over the conduct of the war had drained any appetite to give either admiral a higher permanent grade—or any other World War I officer, including March and Bliss. Sims, Benson, March, and Bliss finally regained their wartime ranks on the retired list in 1930, but without the extra pay and equivalence to Dewey and Pershing that would have accompanied a permanent promotion in 1919.

==== General of the Armies ====
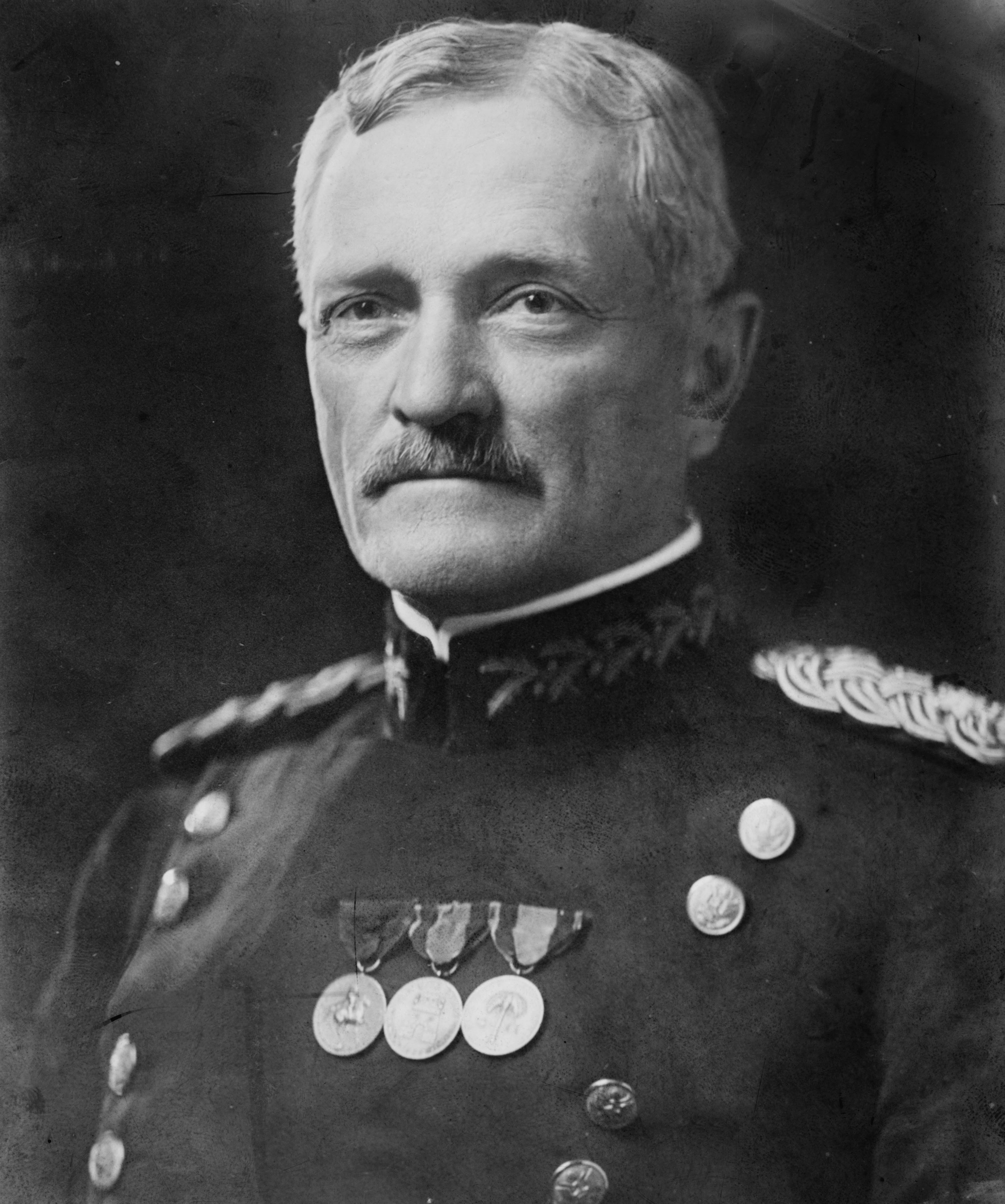
John J. Pershing, fifth four-star general in the United States Army, whose emergency World War I grade of general was made permanent in 1919 as General of the Armies.

Congress authorized Pershing to be appointed General of the Armies on September 3, 1919, just in time for the secretary of war to hand him his new commission when he returned from Europe. His promotion was easily approved in isolation but likely would have failed if bundled with the promotion for March, just as Dewey's 1899 promotion to Admiral of the Navy only passed Congress after being severed from Sampson's doomed vice admiralcy.

As with Dewey, there was considerable confusion over Pershing's rank and title, and he was accidentally nominated to be a general in the Regular Army instead of General of the Armies, although the War Department did not bother to have him renominated, unlike Dewey. The National Defense Act Amendments that defined the peacetime Army establishment in 1920 referred to Pershing's grade simply as "general", just as a 1908 law had referred to Dewey's grade as "Admiral". The Comptroller General of the United States finally ruled in 1924 that the offices of "general", "General of the Army of the United States", and "General of the Armies of the United States" were all the same grade held by Grant, Sherman, Sheridan, and now Pershing, who was therefore entitled to the annual pay of $13,500 and other privileges set for Sherman in 1870, including the right to retire at full pay and allowances.

Pershing retired at the statutory age of 64 in 1924. Three successive Presidents had asked Congress to exempt him from mandatory retirement like Dewey, but every attempt to revise his World War I honors was foiled by demands that similar honors be provided to Benson and Sims, including higher permanent grades.

In December 1928, anticipating the reauthorization of the rank of general for the Army chief of staff, the secretary of war increased the salute for the General of the Armies from the 17 guns of a four-star officer to the 19 guns that Dewey had received as Admiral of the Navy. Army and Navy publications subsequently ranked the General of the Armies with the Admiral of the Navy, treating both grades as senior to four-star service chiefs and five-star officers until they were finally dropped from regulations in 1955, long after the grades had expired with Dewey and Pershing.

==== Army chief of staff ====
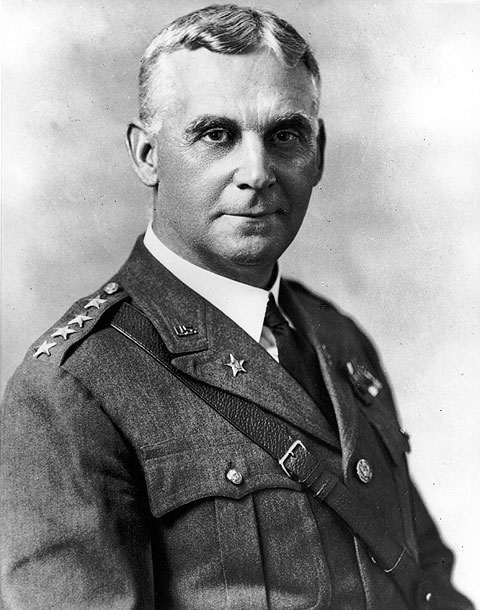
Charles P. Summerall, seventh four-star general in the United States Army and last Army chief of staff to be appointed at a lower rank.

After World War I, the National Defense Act Amendments of 1920 provided the peacetime Army with a single grade of general that lapsed at the next vacancy. When Pershing retired in 1924, the highest active-duty rank in the Army dropped to major general, leaving his two-star successors as Army chief of staff, John L. Hines and Charles P. Summerall, perpetually outranked by their four-star Navy counterpart, the chief of naval operations.

Since the Navy still had 4 admirals—the chief of naval operations and the commanders in chief of the United States Fleet, Battle Fleet, and Asiatic Fleet—and 3 vice admirals, the Army asked in 1928 to have 4 generals—the chief of staff and the commanding generals of the Panama Canal Department, Hawaiian Department and Philippine Department—and 9 lieutenant generals. Three- and four-star ranks would work the same way as in the Navy: a major general held higher rank only while occupying an office designated to carry that rank, reverting to his permanent two-star grade afterward. To allow Summerall to lobby for the bill as the incumbent chief of staff without a conflict of interest, the rank of general for that office would start with his successor.

President Calvin Coolidge supported only the increase in rank for the Army chief of staff, and wanted it to start with Summerall. Following his recommendation, Congress gave the chief of staff the rank of general in 1929, with the same pay and allowances as the chief of naval operations and the right to retire with that rank after four years in office. The chief of staff and chief of naval operations both ranked above all other officers on the active list of the Army and Navy, and took rank between themselves by date of appointment to those offices. After some back and forth between the House and Senate, the bill was amended to specify that the current chief of staff, Summerall, would continue to be outranked by the current chief of naval operations, Charles F. Hughes; Summerall had been chief of staff since 1926, a year before Hughes was appointed chief of naval operations, but Hughes had been a full admiral since 1925, having held two prior four-star commands. The senator sponsoring the bill sighed, "It does not seem very important to Members of the Senate, including myself, but apparently it seems very important to the officers of the two services."

In 1940, special legislation advanced Hines to the rank of general on the retired list as the only living former Army chief of staff never to wear four stars.

==== World War II ====
The United States entered World War II on December 7, 1941, with 5 four-star officers permanently authorized: 1 Army general serving as chief of staff (George Marshall) and 4 Navy admirals serving as chief of naval operations (Harold R. Stark); commanders in chief of the Atlantic Fleet (Ernest J. King) and Asiatic Fleet (Thomas C. Hart); and commander in chief of the Pacific Fleet (Husband E. Kimmel), dual-hatted as commander in chief of the United States Fleet. Early defeats shattered the Pacific and Asiatic Fleets, triggering all 4 admiral designations to change incumbents or jobs by April 1942. Kimmel was relieved as commander in chief of the Pacific Fleet by Chester W. Nimitz and King became commander in chief of the United States Fleet and chief of naval operations, relieving Stark, who was sent to command naval forces in Europe. The demise of the Asiatic Fleet relegated Hart to the General Board, but to shield him from blame, King insisted that he keep his four-star designation and arranged for Congress to pass a law to retire him as an admiral in June 1942, whereupon his four-star designation transferred to the Atlantic Fleet.

The law that retired Hart at four-star rank also authorized any officer who had served at least one year as admiral to retire with that rank, advancing 20 former admirals on the retired list, 9 of whom were recalled to active duty during the war in various jobs that ordinarily would not carry four-star rank, such as service on the General Board and inquiries into the attack on Pearl Harbor. Former Army chief of staff Malin Craig and chiefs of naval operations William H. Standley and William D. Leahy were also recalled to active duty in their four-star ranks.

==== Temporary grades ====
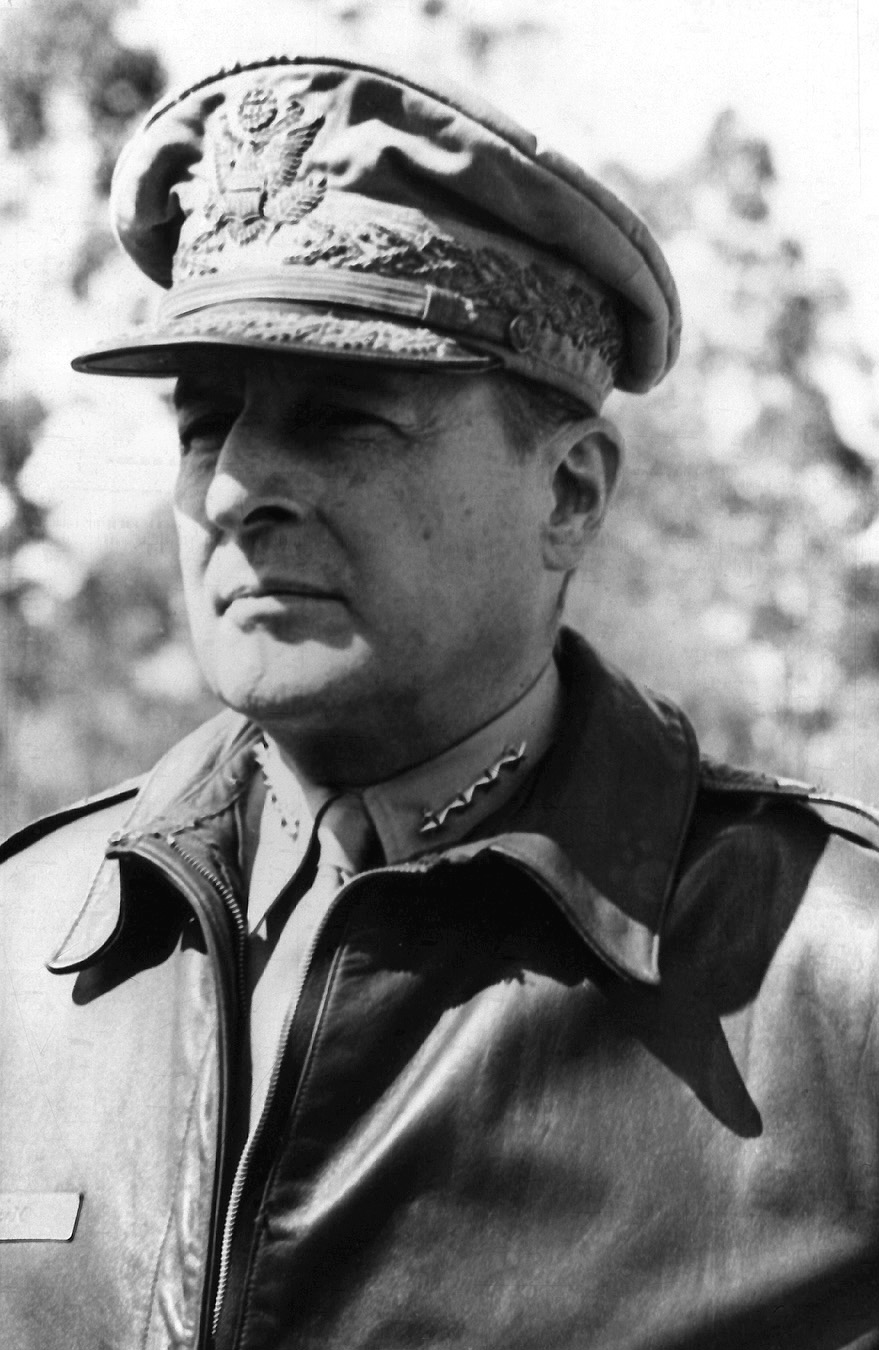
Douglas MacArthur reverted to major general after his term as four-star Army chief of staff, and later became the first temporary general in the Army of the United States during World War II and second five-star general of the Army.

In addition to the 5 designated four-star officers and any retired four-star officers recalled to active duty, the President could appoint, subject to Senate confirmation, an unlimited number of four-star officers in temporary grades lasting up to six months after the end of the war or national emergency. On December 19, 1941, the Senate confirmed Douglas MacArthur to be the first temporary general in the Army of the United States as he fought the Japanese invasion of the Philippines. Temporary grades in the Navy were technically authorized only up to rear admiral, but the Senate confirmed temporary vice admirals and admirals when nominated, approving William Halsey Jr. as the first temporary admiral in November 1942 to reward his victory at the Naval Battle of Guadalcanal.

Temporary four-star officers were appointed sparingly over the next two years, including 3 Army generals and 3 Navy admirals. In the Army, Dwight D. Eisenhower was appointed temporary general in February 1943, to command Allied forces in North Africa and later Europe; Henry H. Arnold in March 1943, as commanding general of Army Air Forces and member of the Joint Chiefs of Staff; and Joseph W. Stilwell in August 1944, to convince the Republic of China to give him command of all its military forces, a longshot bid whose failure triggered his recall to the United States to command Army Ground Forces two months later. In the Navy, Raymond A. Spruance was appointed temporary admiral in February 1944, to reward his successful Gilbert and Marshall Islands campaign and put the Fifth Fleet commander on par with the Third Fleet commander, Halsey; Royal E. Ingersoll in November 1944, so he could turn over the Atlantic Fleet and its four-star designation to Jonas H. Ingram and take command of the Western Sea Frontier to unclog the Navy's Pacific supply pipeline; and Frederick J. Horne in December 1944, masking his demotion by a Navy Department reorganization in September that downgraded his job of vice chief of naval operations.

==== Six-star grades ====
Proposals to create five- and six-star grades during World War II were alternately inspired by the decorative grades held by Dewey and Pershing and their Civil War predecessors, which were permanent personal promotions made after a war to reward proven field commanders, and the functional grades held by designated, emergency, and temporary four-star officers, which were temporary boosts in rank while performing a job during or before a war.

As early as March 1942, a bill was introduced in the House to designate the chief of naval operations and commander in chief of the United States Fleet to each hold the five-star rank of admiral of the fleet while so serving, with the same two-star pay as a three- or four-star officer but a higher personal money allowance. The Navy opposed that bill, but backed similar bills introduced in the House and Senate in March 1943 to create a five-star grade of admiral of the fleet, to be held ex officio by the chief of naval operations (now dual-hatted with the commander in chief of the United States Fleet) but allowing additional appointments in the new grade. The bills failed when Army chief of staff Marshall refused to endorse a corresponding five-star grade in the Army.

In January 1944, the Navy and its congressional supporters sought to elevate the four American members of the Combined Chiefs of Staff—Navy four-star admirals Leahy and King, and Army four-star generals Marshall and Arnold—to ranks comparable to the British admirals of the fleet and field marshals serving on that committee. The House Naval Affairs Committee reported out a bill in February to revive Dewey's decorative grade by authorizing two Admirals of the Navy with the same pay and allowances as the General of the Armies, the right to retire in that grade, and a six-star insignia. The plan was to promote the two naval members of the Combined Chiefs of Staff, Leahy and King, to the permanent six-star grade of Admiral of the Navy, with a five-star grade of admiral of the fleet to be created later for field commanders like Nimitz and Halsey. The Army would likewise promote its Combined Chiefs of Staff members, Marshall and Arnold, to Pershing's grade of General of the Armies, interpreted as the corresponding six-star grade, and create a five-star grade of general of the Army for field commanders like MacArthur and Eisenhower. The chairmen of the House and Senate Military Affairs Committees introduced bills to appoint two additional Generals of the Armies, but the proposal foundered on the objection that the decorative grades held by Dewey and Pershing had only ever had one appointment at a time, always a field commander whose merit was assessed after a war, not during it.

In June, the Senate Naval Affairs Committee declared that fleet admiral was one grade higher than four-star admiral and Admiral of the Navy was two grades higher, and reported out a bill creating a five-star grade of fleet admiral as a functional grade for wartime use, leaving a notional six-star grade of Admiral of the Navy to be the decorative grade awarded after the war.

==== Five-star grades ====
Congress created five-star grades in December 1944, authorizing 4 temporary generals of the Army and 4 temporary fleet admirals of the United States Navy until six months after the end of the war. Five-star officers received the same two-star pay as three- and four-star officers, but a higher personal money allowance.

The law established fleet admiral as "the highest grade in the Navy" that existed at the time, leaving its rank ambiguous relative to grades that no longer existed, like Admiral of the Navy. However, the Army's five-star grade could not likewise be declared the highest in the Army without superseding Pershing's still-extant grade of General of the Armies. Instead, generals of the Army were given "rank above all other officers on the active list of or on active duty in the Army"; the bedridden Pershing had transferred to the retired list in 1924 and was no longer on active duty despite drawing full active-duty pay and allowances.

The Army promptly promoted Marshall, MacArthur, Eisenhower, and Arnold to general of the Army, leaving only Stilwell and Craig as four-star generals. The Navy promoted Leahy, King, and Nimitz, but left the fourth fleet admiralcy vacant until after the war, when Halsey was selected over Spruance in December 1945.

==== Permanent four-star grades ====
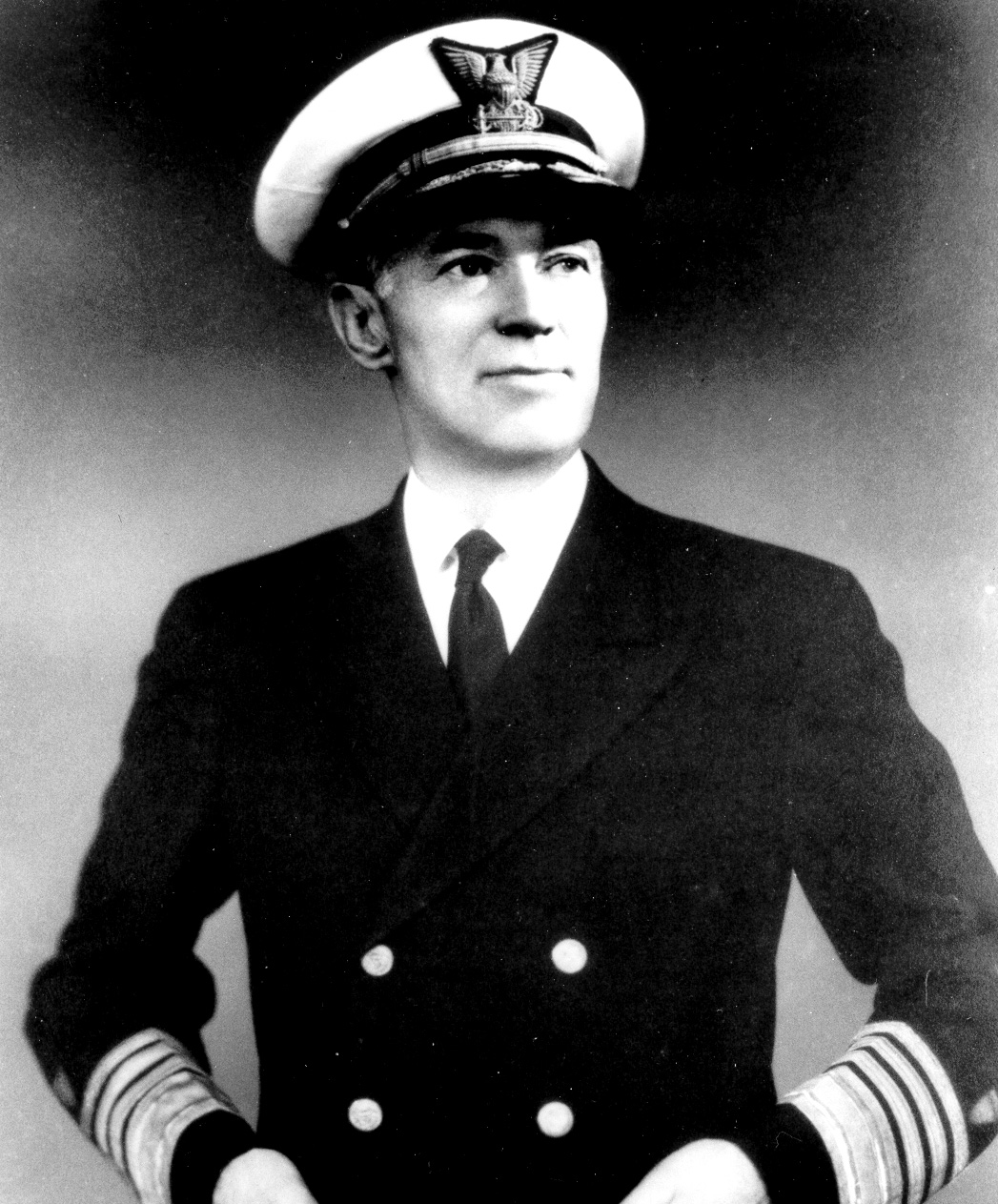
Russell R. Waesche, first four-star admiral in the United States Coast Guard, was one of five officers whose World War II service was honored with a permanent four-star promotion and full active-duty pay and allowances in retirement.

In March 1945, fulfilling a deal made to pass the five-star bill, the commandants of the Marine Corps and Coast Guard received four-star rank until six months after the end of the war. A year later, all five-star officers and the two Marine Corps and Coast Guard commandants who held four-star rank during the war were rewarded with permanent promotions to those grades, including full active-duty pay and allowances in retirement. Since this gave the Marine Corps a permanent general, Alexander Vandegrift, and the Coast Guard a permanent admiral, Russell R. Waesche, the other three services were each granted one permanent four-star promotion in 1948: in the Army, Omar Bradley, later promoted to permanent five-star general; in the Air Force, Carl Spaatz; and in the Navy, Raymond A. Spruance, who had been the runner up for the last fleet admiralcy.

==== Demobilization ====
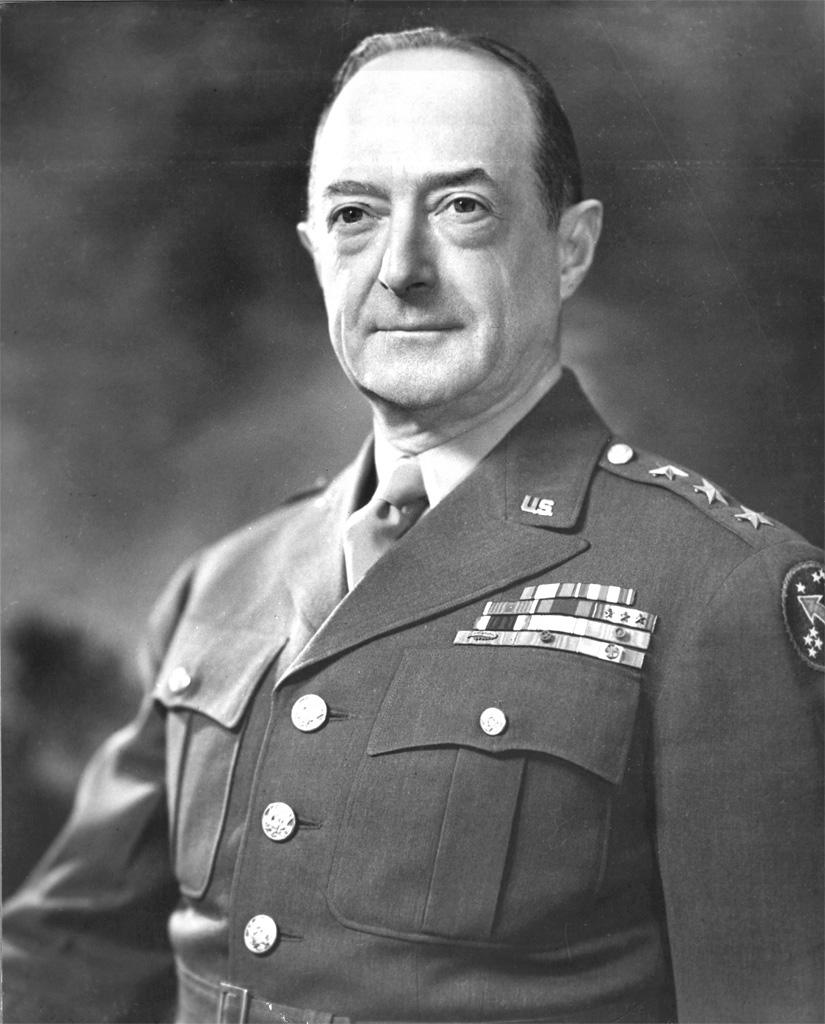
Army lieutenant general Robert C. Richardson Jr. was promoted posthumously to four-star general against the recommendation of the Army.

In the last six months of the war, the Navy received 5 more temporary admirals, including two fleet commanders (Henry K. Hewitt, Thomas C. Kinkaid), the prospective amphibious commander for the invasion of Japan (Richmond K. Turner), the deputy commander in chief of the United States Fleet and deputy chief of naval operations (Richard S. Edwards), and the director of the Office of Procurement and Material in the Navy Department (Samuel M. Robinson). The Army received 11 more temporary generals, including the deputy chief of staff (Thomas T. Handy); the former commanding general of United States forces in the Philippines, a newly liberated prisoner of war (Jonathan M. Wainwright); and the commanding generals of Army Service Forces (Brehon B. Somervell), Army forces in the Mediterranean theater (Joseph T. McNarney), two theater air forces (George Kenney, Carl Spaatz), three army groups (Jacob L. Devers, Mark W. Clark, Omar Bradley), and three of the nine field armies operating in combat theaters (Walter Krueger, George S. Patton, Courtney Hodges).

The other six field army commanders would also have been promoted before the end of the war if not for administrative delays, so in 1954 the House introduced a bill to advance to four-star rank on the retired list, or posthumously, any Army lieutenant general who commanded a field army in the European or Pacific theater (Simon Bolivar Buckner Jr., Alexander M. Patch, William H. Simpson, Lucian K. Truscott, Robert L. Eichelberger, Leonard T. Gerow) or Army Ground Forces (Lesley J. McNair, Ben Lear) during World War II. The Army supported these promotions, but opposed the Senate's addition of Robert C. Richardson Jr., who had been administrative but not operational commander of Army forces in the Pacific. Instead of deleting the recently deceased Richardson from the list, the House added Albert C. Wedemeyer, Stilwell's successor as commander of the China Burma India Theater; and John L. DeWitt, at the insistence of a California congressman who, having voted unsuccessfully in committee to drop Richardson, now argued that DeWitt's California-based Western Defense Command was equivalent to Richardson's command in Hawaii, having overseen the Aleutian Islands campaign in Alaska.

At the end of World War II in September 1945, there were 7 five-star officers and 32 four-star officers on active duty: 4 generals of the Army and 13 generals in the Army, 3 fleet admirals and 17 admirals in the Navy, 1 general in the Marine Corps, and 1 admiral in the Coast Guard. Because temporary grades were vested in the person, not the position, generals and admirals promoted during the war kept their four stars even when assigned to stateside positions meriting less rank, such as command of a field army (Stilwell, Clark, Handy, Hodges, Wainwright) or sea frontier (Edwards, Kinkaid), president of the Naval War College (Spruance), or member of the United Nations Military Staff Committee (Kenney, Turner, McNarney, Hewitt). To help clear excess flag officers, the retirement age in the Navy, Marine Corps, and Coast Guard was lowered from 64 to 62 in 1946.

=== Retirement ===
==== Mandatory retirement ====
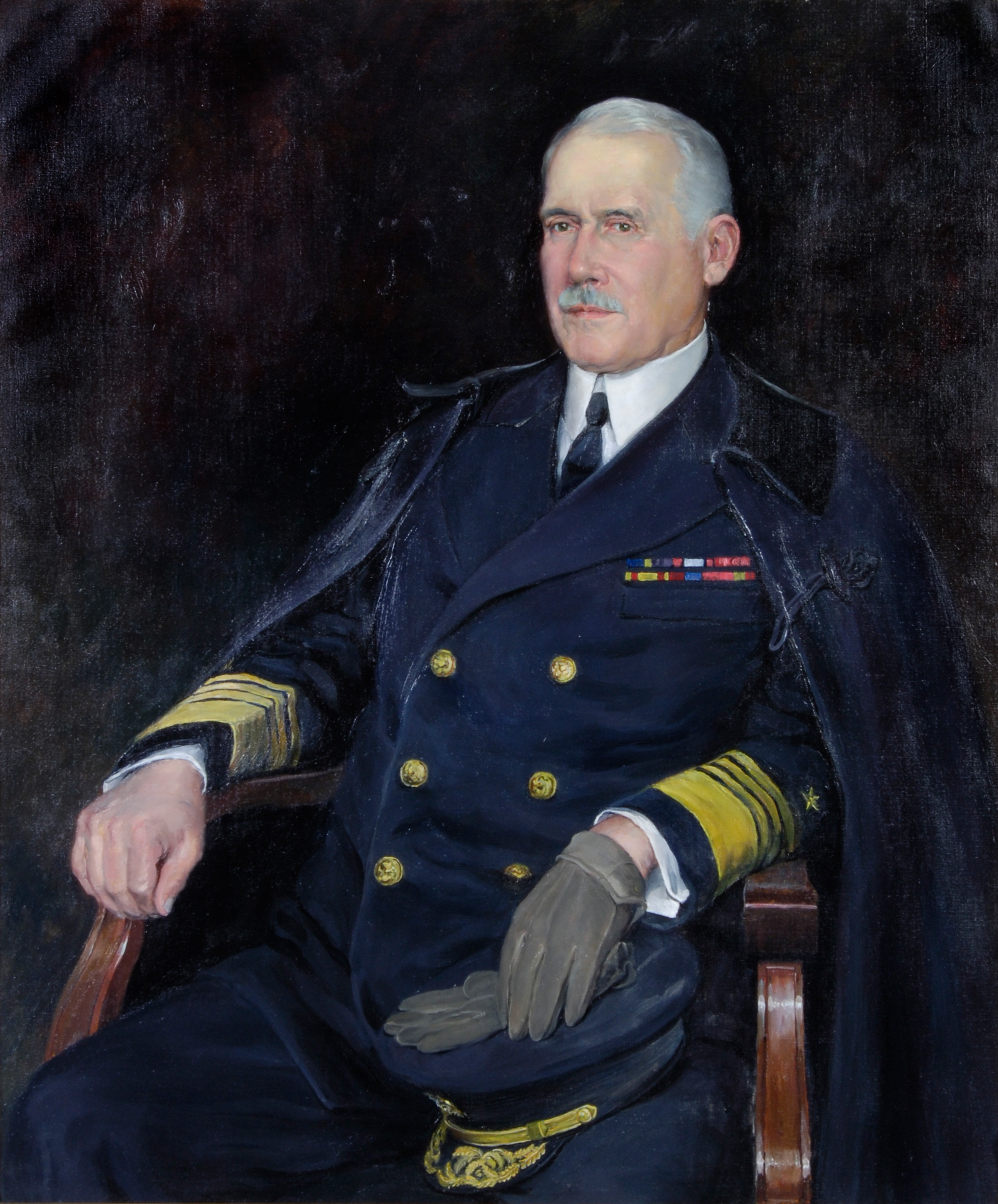
To defer his mandatory retirement, chief of naval operations William V. Pratt was continued in his four-star job after reaching the Navy's statutory retirement age of 64, which did not apply to three- and four-star officers.

Army and Navy officers were required by statute to retire upon reaching a certain age. The statutory retirement age for the Navy had been 62 since the Civil War, but was increased in 1916 to match the corresponding age in the Army, which had been set at 64 in 1882.

Until 1946, the Navy statutory retirement age applied only to officers below the rank of vice admiral. However, a three- or four-star admiral typically relinquished the job designated to carry that rank on or before his 64th birthday, and reverted to rear admiral to be automatically retired for age. In February 1933, four-star chief of naval operations William V. Pratt was due to retire on his 64th birthday, only four days before the inauguration of a new president, Franklin D. Roosevelt. To give himself time to select a successor, Roosevelt deferred Pratt's retirement by continuing him in his four-star job until July. Roosevelt exercised the same option during World War II to keep another chief of naval operations, Ernest J. King, on the active list past his 64th birthday in November 1942. The Army had no comparable exception to its retirement age, so Congress passed a law exempting King's counterpart—Army chief of staff George Marshall, who turned 64 in December 1944—from being retired for age until six months after the end of the war.

To help clear surplus three- and four-star officers after World War II, the retirement age in the Navy, Marine Corps, and Coast Guard was lowered from 64 to 62 and applied to all officers below the rank of fleet admiral, although up to 10 officers could have their retirements deferred until age 64, such as the chairman of the General Board of the Navy, John H. Towers.

==== Admiral of the Navy ====
The grade of vice admiral had been exempted from mandatory retirement when it was created in 1864 for David G. Farragut, as was the subsequent grade of admiral created in 1866 for Farragut and David D. Porter, who both remained on the active list at full pay until their deaths in 1870 and 1891. The 1899 grade of Admiral of the Navy received the same exemption, authorizing George Dewey to stay on the active list until he asked to retire, which he never did, serving as president of the General Board of the Navy until his death in 1917.

==== General of the Armies ====
Unlike the Navy, the Army did not exempt its highest grade when it established a statutory retirement age in 1882, at the request of the incumbent General of the Army, William Tecumseh Sherman. Instead, the General of the Army was authorized to retire at full pay and allowances. When the grade was revived for John J. Pershing in 1919, Pershing's General of the Armies grade inherited the retirement properties of Sherman's grade, including full pay and allowances in retirement but also mandatory retirement at age 64. Pershing served as General of the Armies under three Presidents before transferring to the retired list on his 64th birthday in 1924. All three Presidents asked Congress to keep Pershing on the active list for life like Dewey—perhaps as head of the Joint Army and Navy Board, the interwar precursor to the Joint Chiefs of Staff, analogous to Dewey's lifetime presidency of the General Board of the Navy—but to no avail.

==== Designated four-star officers ====
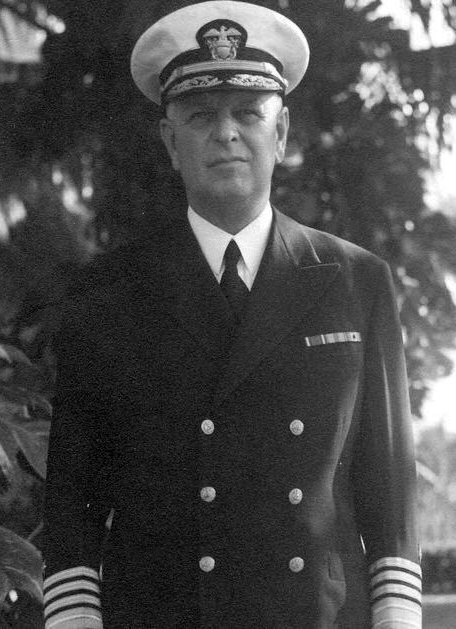
Retired rear admiral Husband E. Kimmel was the only former admiral not restored to four-star rank on the retired list after becoming eligible in 1947.

Although Congress specifically did not want designated admirals and vice admirals to be able to retire in those grades, almost every former three- or four-star admiral was eventually advanced to that rank on the retired list if he lived long enough. Ten former admirals regained their fourth stars in 1930, when Congress gave World War I veterans their highest wartime rank (but not its pay) on the retired list. In June 1942, Congress authorized the last commander in chief of the Asiatic Fleet, Thomas C. Hart, to retire as a full admiral, and granted the same privilege (but without extra pay) to officers who retired while actually designated as admiral or vice admiral, or who had held that designation for at least one year. Under this law, James O. Richardson retired as an admiral despite reverting to rear admiral after his summary relief as commander in chief of the United States Fleet, but his successor, Husband E. Kimmel, retired as a rear admiral, having served less than a year as admiral before himself being relieved after the attack on Pearl Harbor. Kimmel was the only eligible officer not advanced to his former rank when the one-year requirement was removed by the Officer Personnel Act of 1947, which also eliminated designated admirals entirely by requiring that all three- and four-star officers be confirmed by the Senate. All former designated admirals and vice admirals finally received higher retired pay in 1958, including Kimmel.

==== Chief of naval operations and Army chief of staff ====
Initially the chief of naval operations, like any other designated admiral, lost his four-star rank upon relinquishing office and retired in his permanent two-star grade. However, when the rank of the Army chief of staff was raised to four stars to match the chief of naval operations in 1929, existing laws governing chiefs of Army branches and staff corps entitled the chief of staff to retire with the four-star rank of that office, so the chief of naval operations was likewise authorized to retire with that rank in 1938.

==== Temporary four-star officers ====
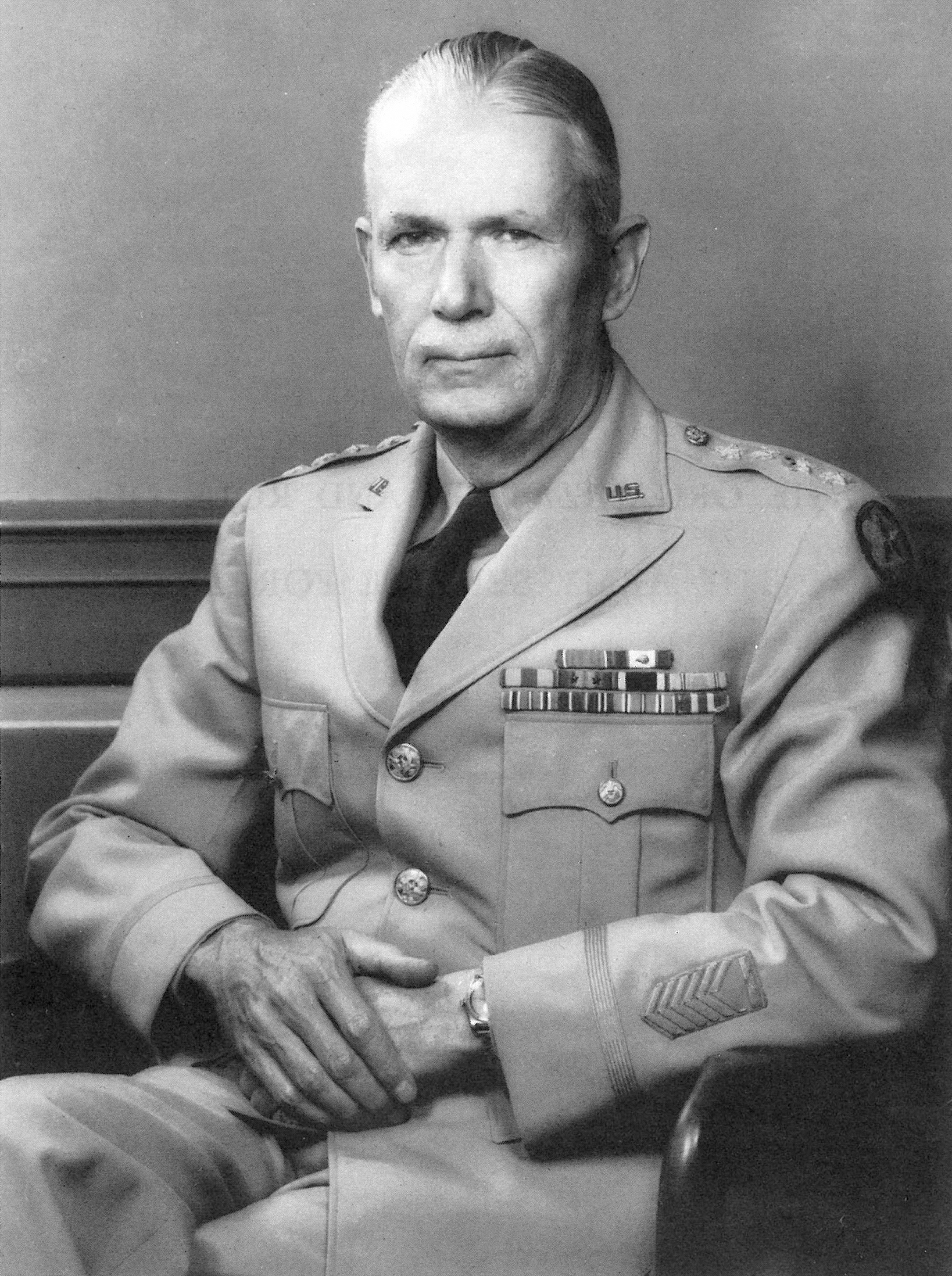
Army temporary four-star general Brehon B. Somervell retired as a major general because he was too healthy to retire for disability.

The Navy temporary promotion law let Regular Navy and Marine Corps officers retire with the highest temporary rank in which they performed satisfactorily on active duty, including four-star ranks, but the Army temporary promotion law only let officers retire with their highest temporary rank if they incurred a disability while serving in that rank. Army four-star generals Walter Krueger and Brehon B. Somervell were both appointed to that temporary grade in March 1945, and both retired from the Army in 1946, but Krueger was placed on the retired list as a general and Somervell as a major general because Krueger retired for disability but Somervell retired at his own request.

The Officer Personnel Act of 1947 let any officer who held a temporary three- or four-star grade during World War II to retire with that rank, so Somervell was advanced to general on the retired list in 1948. The Army and Air Force Vitalization and Retirement Equalization Act of 1948 automatically advanced Army and Air Force officers on the retired list to the highest temporary grade in which they served satisfactorily for at least six months during World War II, with no further confirmation by the Senate, which let Army general Mark W. Clark retire with four stars in 1953 without the controversy of a Senate vote that would have been opposed by a Texas congressional delegation that still blamed Clark for heavy casualties suffered by a Texas National Guard division under his command at the Battle of Rapido River.

==== Tombstone promotions ====
In 1938, Congress authorized any Navy and Marine Corps line officer who had been specially commended for performance in duty in actual combat to retire with the rank but not the pay of the next highest grade, a privilege extended to the Coast Guard in 1942. Such tombstone promotions for combat citations allowed dozens of three-star officers in the Navy, Marine Corps, and Coast Guard to retire with four stars, including the first four-star general in the Marine Corps, Thomas Holcomb. Eligibility was limited in 1947 to duty performed before the end of World War II, and combat citation promotions were halted entirely in 1959.

Even if an officer reverted to two stars after leaving his last three-star assignment, he could still retire with four stars if he served creditably in a temporary three-star grade during World War II. A 1946 law gave Navy, Marine Corps, and Coast Guard officers the retired pay as well as the rank of the highest temporary grade in which they had satisfactory service on or before June 30, 1946, which the Judge Advocate General of the Navy interpreted to mean an officer could apply his tombstone promotion to his highest temporary grade from World War II, instead of the grade he held when he retired. For example, Navy rear admiral David W. Bagley was restored to his highest wartime temporary grade of vice admiral when he retired on April 1, 1947, and received a tombstone promotion to admiral. Another former vice admiral, Robert C. Giffen, was reprimanded for misconduct while commanding the Caribbean Sea Frontier in that temporary grade, so he retired as a rear admiral and received a tombstone promotion back to vice admiral. A third former vice admiral, Alexander Sharp Jr., had satisfactory three-star service and a qualifying combat citation but did not get a four-star tombstone promotion because, although designated to hold three-star rank ex officio in his wartime job as Atlantic Fleet Service Force commander, he was never appointed personally to the temporary grade of vice admiral, and tombstone promotions were based on personal grades, not designated ranks.

=== Compensation ===
==== Admiral of the Navy ====
The 1899 naval appropriation act gave the Admiral of the Navy the same pay and allowances as the last General of the Army, which had been fixed in 1870 at an annual pay of $13,500 and housing allowance of $1,500, for a total compensation of $15,000 (equivalent to $580,500 in 2025) a year. By comparison, the next-highest Navy pay in 1899 was the $7,500 of a rear admiral (upper half) and even Cabinet officers received only $10,000 a year, including the secretary of the Navy to whom Dewey reported. The only higher federal salary was the $50,000 of the President. Unsurprisingly, the Admiral of the Navy was the only exception to the law that increased the pay of every other person in the Navy, officer or enlisted, active or retired, in 1908, and Dewey never received another pay raise during his lifetime. However, the Admiral of the Navy was exempt from mandatory retirement, so Dewey remained on the active list at full pay and allowances until his death in 1917.

Tying the compensation of the Admiral of the Navy to a defunct Army grade sometimes disqualified Dewey from more recent benefits. The Comptroller of the Treasury denied him an allowance created in 1899 that let every other Navy officer purchase fuel at the same rate as an Army officer of corresponding rank, because the Army rank corresponding to Admiral of the Navy no longer existed.

==== General of the Armies ====
The 1919 law that promoted Pershing gave the General of the Armies the same annual pay as the Admiral of the Navy—the $13,500 of an 1870 General of the Army—but left allowances to the discretion of the President, who set them at $8,000 a year for a total annual compensation of $21,500 (equivalent to $399,256 in 2025). The 1944 proposal to create more Admirals of the Navy would have given them the same pay and allowances as the General of the Armies.

Like Dewey, Pershing was paid more than any official in the federal government except the President, even after he transferred to the retired list in 1924. Congress had authorized Sherman to retire with full pay and allowances after he declined to have his grade of General of the Army exempted from the statutory retirement age in 1882, a benefit inherited by Pershing when the Comptroller General ruled that, despite being titled "General of the Armies" instead of "General of the Army", Pershing held the same grade as Sherman. Without this ruling, Pershing would have retired at the same three-quarters pay and no allowances as every other Army and Navy officer, cutting his annual income to $10,125, less than half of the $21,500 he actually received for the rest of his life.

==== Designated, emergency, and temporary four-star officers ====
When the ranks of admiral and vice admiral were revived in 1915, rear admirals serving as fleet commanders in chief or seconds-in-command were authorized annual pay of $10,000 while designated to carry the rank of admiral or $9,000 while designated vice admiral. These were relatively nominal increments over the $8,000 of a rear admiral (upper half), compared to the $13,500 of the Admiral of the Navy. The chief of naval operations was designated to carry four-star rank at $10,000 pay in 1916, but with no allowances. Emergency generals were created for the Army in 1917 with the same $10,000 pay as a designated admiral, plus allowances as set by the secretary of war, and Army and Navy compensation was equalized the following year by giving Navy admirals the same allowances as Army generals.

The Joint Service Pay Readjustment Act of 1922 capped base pay at the $8,000 of a two-star officer, the highest permanent grade. Temporary grades carried the same compensation as the equivalent permanent grades or designated ranks. Three- and four-star officers augmented their two-star pay with a personal money allowance of $500 for three-star officers and $2,200 for four-star officers. Five-star officers received a $5,000 personal money allowance when those grades were created in 1944. Officers retired at three-quarters of active-duty base pay and no allowances, so replacing higher pay grades with allowances gave three-, four-, and five-star officers the same retired pay as a two-star officer. When Army chief of staff Charles P. Summerall retired in 1931, his annual compensation fell from $10,200 to only $6,000, three-quarters of a major general's pay and less than a third of the $21,500 that Pershing received.

==== Permanent four-star officers ====
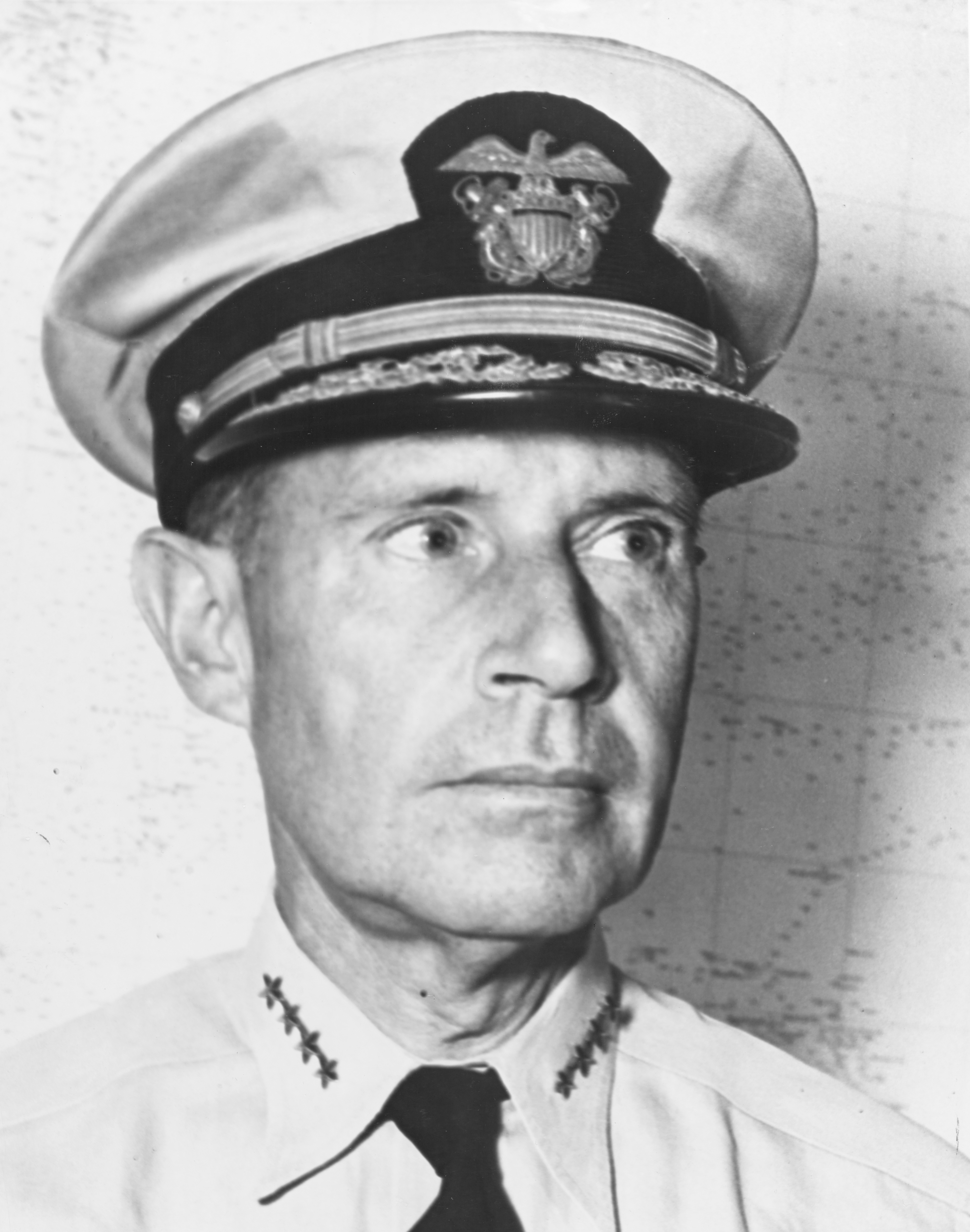
As a permanent four-star admiral, Raymond A. Spruance received almost as much retirement income as if he had been promoted to five-star admiral.

After World War I, Pershing's emergency four-star grade was made permanent by promoting him to General of the Armies, a grade that entitled him to retire with full pay and allowances instead of the standard three-quarters pay with no allowances. After World War II, all temporary five-star officers were likewise rewarded with permanent five-star grades, and permanent four-star grades were awarded to one temporary four-star officer in each service: Omar Bradley in the Army (later promoted to five-star general), Carl Spaatz in the Air Force, Raymond A. Spruance in the Navy, Alexander Vandegrift in the Marine Corps, and Russell R. Waesche in the Coast Guard.

Permanent four- and five-star officers retired with the full pay and allowances of an officer holding the corresponding temporary grade on the active list, which comprised the pay and allowances of a two-star officer—set by the 1948 pay tables at an annual base pay of $8,800 and up to $1,944 in food and housing allowances—plus a personal money allowance of $2,200 for a four-star officer or $5,000 for a five-star officer. By contrast, the General of the Armies had an annual base pay of $13,500, plus $8,000 in allowances. This gave the General of the Armies $21,500 (equivalent to $288,106 in 2025) in annual retirement income, permanent five-star officers $15,744 (equivalent to $210,974 in 2025), and permanent four-star officers $12,944 (equivalent to $173,453 in 2025). All other retired four-star officers got the same $6,600 (equivalent to $88,442 in 2025) retired pay as three- and two-star officers, a gap widened further by the fact that pay was taxable, but not allowances.

The special class of permanent four- and five-star officers was sometimes overlooked by military pay laws. In 1955, Congress took the first step toward creating a higher pay grade by giving all four-star officers on active duty an annual pay increment of $2,400—but not five-star officers, since none were still active. This had the unintended effect of raising the annual compensation of a permanent four-star officer to only $400 less than a permanent five-star officer, closing the gap in their income from 12 percent to 2 percent.

Permanent four- and five-star compensation tracked every increase in two-star pay and allowances until being frozen at the 1955 rates of $20,143 (equivalent to $224,779 in 2025) and $20,543 (equivalent to $229,243 in 2025) by the same military pay law that finally created separate O-9 and O-10 pay grades for three- and four-star officers in 1958. Like Dewey and Pershing before them, permanent four- and five-star officers were specifically excluded from almost every subsequent increase in military compensation until 1973, by which point Bradley, a permanent five-star general, was being paid about the same $22,154 (equivalent to $160,675 in 2025) as a newly retired one-star general.

== Legislation ==
Legislation	Citation	Summary	Service
Act of March 2, 1899; Act of March 3, 1899	30 Stat. 995; 30 Stat. 1024; 30 Stat. 1045	Authorized one appointment of an Admiral of the Navy, who would not be retired except on his own application (George Dewey).; Set annual pay of Admiral of the Navy to be the same as the last General of the Army ($13,500, 16 Stat. 320).	USN
Act of May 13, 1908	35 Stat. 127	Set annual pay of Admiral [of the Navy] at $13,500.	USN
Act of December 19, 1913	38 Stat. 241	Specified four-year term for major general commandant of the Marine Corps, with no limit on reappointments.	USMC
Act of March 3, 1915	38 Stat. 929; 38 Stat. 941	Reestablished grade of admiral in the Navy.; Authorized rank of admiral for officers designated as commander in chief of the United States Atlantic Fleet, United States Pacific Fleet, or Asiatic Fleet.; Set annual pay of admiral at $10,000.; Established chief of naval operations with rank of rear admiral, appointed by the President and confirmed by the Senate for a four-year term.	USN
Act of August 29, 1916	39 Stat. 558; 39 Stat. 579	Increased rank of chief of naval operations to admiral, to rank next after the Admiral of the Navy.; Set annual pay of chief of naval operations at $10,000.; Raised mandatory retirement age for Navy officers below the rank of vice admiral from 62 to 64.	USN
Act of May 22, 1917	40 Stat. 89	Authorized rank of admiral for up to three officers designated to command fleets or subdivisions of fleets.	USN
Act of October 6, 1917	40 Stat. 410	Authorized emergency grade of general for chief of staff of the Army (Tasker H. Bliss, Peyton C. March) and commander of United States forces in France (John J. Pershing) during the World War I emergency.; Set annual pay for emergency general at $10,000.	USA
Act of July 1, 1918	40 Stat. 716	Set allowances for chief of naval operations and other admirals to be the same as for a general in the Army.	USN
Act of September 3, 1919	41 Stat. 283	Revived office of General of the Armies of the United States to be specially conferred upon a general officer of the Army for distinguished higher command of military forces on foreign soil during World War I (John J. Pershing).; Set annual pay for General of the Armies to be the same as a general in 1870 ($13,500, 16 Stat. 320), plus allowances.	USA
Act of June 4, 1920 [National Defense Act Amendments]	41 Stat. 760; 41 Stat. 762	Authorized one grade of general, as now authorized by law, to be terminated at next vacancy (John J. Pershing).; Terminated all emergency grades on July 1, 1920 (Tasker H. Bliss, Peyton C. March).; Authorized chief of branch to retire with the rank, pay, and allowances specified by law for the grade held while chief (Charles P. Summerall, Douglas MacArthur, Malin Craig).	USA
Act of June 10, 1922 [Joint Service Pay Readjustment Act]	42 Stat. 629	Set annual compensation of major general or rear admiral (upper half) at $8,000 base pay and up to $1,700 in subsistence and rental allowances, plus a personal money allowance of $500 if serving as vice admiral or $2,200 if serving as admiral or chief of naval operations.	USA, USN, USMC, USCG
Act of February 23, 1929	45 Stat. 1255	Increased rank of chief of staff of the Army to general.; Specified that chief of staff of the Army and chief of naval operations outrank all other officers on the active list of the Army and Navy, and rank relative to each other by date of appointment.; Set annual compensation of chief of staff of the Army to be the same pay and allowances as a major general, plus the personal money allowance of the chief of naval operations.	USA
Act of March 2, 1929	45 Stat. 1482	Authorized retired Navy officers to accept diplomatic appointments.	USN
Act of June 21, 1930	46 Stat. 793	Authorized promotion on the retired list or posthumously to highest grade held during World War I, but with no increase in retired pay (Army: Tasker H. Bliss, Peyton C. March; Navy: Henry T. Mayo, William B. Caperton, William S. Benson, William S. Sims, Henry B. Wilson Jr., Hugh Rodman, Albert Gleaves, Robert E. Coontz, Joseph Strauss, Hilary P. Jones).	USA, USN
Act of June 15, 1933	48 Stat. 161	Authorized Regular Army officers to be appointed to temporary higher grades in the Army of the United States in time of war, with temporary general officer appointments requiring Senate confirmation.	USA
Act of June 22, 1938	52 Stat. 839	Authorized officers to retire with the highest rank or grade held while serving as chief of naval operations (William V. Pratt, William H. Standley).	USN
Act of June 23, 1938	52 Stat. 951; 52 Stat. 952	Authorized Navy line officers to retire with the rank but not the pay of the next higher grade if specially commended for performance of duty in actual combat.; Authorized Marine Corps officers to retire like Navy line officers.	USN, USMC
Act of July 15, 1939	53 Stat. 1045	Authorized retired Army officers to accept diplomatic appointments.	USA
Act of June 15, 1940 [Private Law 76-379]	54 Stat. 1286	Authorized promotion of John L. Hines to general on the retired list.	USA
Act of September 9, 1940	54 Stat. 875	Authorized Regular Army officers to be appointed to temporary higher grades in time of national emergency as well as war.	USA
Act of July 24, 1941	55 Stat. 603	Authorized Regular Navy and Marine Corps officers to be appointed to temporary higher ranks or grades in time of war or national emergency, with appointments to rear admiral requiring the advice and consent of the Senate.; Authorized retirement in highest temporary rank held on active duty.	USN
Act of June 16, 1942 [Pay Readjustment Act of 1942]	56 Stat. 362	Set annual compensation for officers serving in the grade of admiral or general, as chief of naval operations or chief of staff of the Army, or in corresponding grades in other services, to be the same pay and allowances as a rear admiral (lower half), plus a personal money allowance of $2,200.	USA, USN, USMC, USCG
Act of June 16, 1942	56 Stat. 370	Authorized officers retired while commanding a fleet or fleet subdivision in the rank of admiral or vice admiral, or who served as such commander for one year or more, to retire in the highest grade held while on the active list, but with no increase in retired pay (Samuel S. Robison, Thomas Washington, Clarence S. Williams, Richard H. Jackson, Henry A. Wiley, Louis R. de Steiguer, Louis M. Nulton, Charles B. McVay Jr., Montgomery M. Taylor, Richard H. Leigh, Luke McNamee, David F. Sellers, Joseph M. Reeves, Frank H. Brumby, Orin G. Murfin, Arthur J. Hepburn, Harry E. Yarnell, Edward C. Kalbfus, Claude C. Bloch, James O. Richardson).; Authorized rank of admiral on the retired list for the commander in chief of the Asiatic Fleet who operated against the enemy between December 7, 1941, and February 14, 1942 (Thomas C. Hart).	USN
Act of July 28, 1942	56 Stat. 722	Authorized posthumous commissions for officers who died in the line of duty before receiving a grade to which they had been promoted or recommended for promotion after September 8, 1939 (George B. Simler).	USA, USN, USMC
Act of June 29, 1943	57 Stat. 249	Authorized Regular Army officers incurring disability while in temporary grade to retire with that grade (Walter Krueger).	USA
Act of December 2, 1944	58 Stat. 793	Exempted from statutory retirement age of 64 until six months after the end of World War II, the Regular Army officer serving as chief of staff of the Army during that war (George C. Marshall Jr.) [repealed in 1947 (61 Stat. 449)].	USA
Act of December 14, 1944	58 Stat. 802	Established the grade of; 1. fleet admiral of the United States Navy, as the highest grade in the Navy.; 2. general of the Army, whose appointees rank above all other officers on active duty in the Army.; Authorized until six months after the end of World War II: 1. 4 grades of general of the Army, appointed from Army officers serving in any general officer grade (George C. Marshall Jr., Douglas MacArthur, Dwight D. Eisenhower, Henry H. Arnold); and; 2. 4 grades of fleet admiral of the United States Navy, appointed from Navy line officers serving in the rank of admiral (William D. Leahy, Ernest J. King, Chester W. Nimitz, William F. Halsey Jr.).; Authorized retirement in highest grade with three-quarters of active-duty pay.; Set annual compensation to be same pay and allowances as rear admiral (upper half), plus a $5,000 personal money allowance.	USN
Act of March 21, 1945	59 Stat. 36	Authorized one grade of general, appointed from officers serving now or hereafter as commandant of the Marine Corps, until six months after the end of World War II (Alexander A. Vandegrift).	USMC
Act of March 21, 1945	59 Stat. 37	Authorized one grade of admiral, appointed from officers serving now or hereafter as commandant of the Coast Guard, until six months after the end of World War II (Russell R. Waesche, Joseph F. Farley).	USCG
Act of July 2, 1945 [Private Law 79-140]	59 Stat. 741	Authorized appointment of Omar N. Bradley as Administrator of Veterans' Affairs while retaining rank of general.	USA
Act of February 21, 1946	60 Stat. 28	Authorized Navy, Marine Corps, and Coast Guard officers to retire with the rank and three-fourths of the active-duty pay of the highest temporary grade in which they served satisfactorily on or before June 30, 1946.; Lowered mandatory retirement age for Navy, Marine Corps, and Coast Guard officers below the rank of fleet admiral from 64 to 62.; Authorized President to defer retirement of up to 10 officers until age 64 (John H. Towers, Felix B. Stump).	USN, USMC, USCG
Act of March 23, 1946	60 Stat. 59	Authorized corresponding permanent grade and full active-duty pay and allowances in retirement for officers who served in the temporary grade of: 1. general of the Army after December 14, 1944, and before August 14, 1945 (George C. Marshall Jr., Douglas MacArthur, Dwight D. Eisenhower, Henry H. Arnold); 2. fleet admiral of the United States Navy after December 14, 1944, and before December 14, 1945 (William D. Leahy, Ernest J. King, Chester W. Nimitz, William F. Halsey Jr.); 3. general as commandant of the Marine Corps after March 21, 1945, and before August 14, 1945 (Alexander A. Vandegrift); and; 4. admiral as commandant of the Coast Guard after March 21, 1945, and before August 14, 1945 (Russell R. Waesche).	USA, USN, USMC, USCG

== See also ==
- Legislative history of United States four-star officers
- Legislative history of United States four-star officers until 1865
- Legislative history of United States four-star officers, 1866–1898
- Legislative history of United States four-star officers, 1947–1979
- Legislative history of United States four-star officers, 1980–2016
- Legislative history of United States four-star officers from 2017
