= List of Department of Transportation appointments by Donald Trump =

Key
Appointees serving in offices that did not require Senate confirmation.
Appointees confirmed by the Senate who are currently serving or served through the entire term.
Appointees awaiting Senate confirmation.
Appointees serving in an acting capacity.
Appointees who have left office after confirmation or offices which have been disbanded.
Nominees who were withdrawn prior to being confirmed or assuming office.

== Appointments (first administration) ==
Office	Nominee	Assumed office	Left office
Secretary of Transportation	Elaine Chao	January 31, 2017 (Confirmed January 31, 2017, 93–6)	January 11, 2021
Deputy Secretary of Transportation	Steven G. Bradbury	September 10, 2019	January 20, 2021
Deputy Secretary of Transportation	Jeffrey Rosen	May 18, 2017 (Confirmed May 16, 2017, 56–42)	May 22, 2019
General Counsel of Transportation	Steven G. Bradbury	November 28, 2017 (Confirmed November 14, 2017, 50–47)	January 20, 2021
General Counsel of Transportation	James C. Owens	August 2017	November 28, 2017
Under Secretary of Transportation (Policy)	Joel Szabat	July 2019	January 20, 2021
Under Secretary of Transportation (Policy)	Joel Szabat	Nomination lapsed and returned to the President on January 3, 2021	
Under Secretary of Transportation (Policy)	Derek Kan	December 4, 2017 (Confirmed November 13, 2017, 90–7)	July 2019
Assistant Secretary of Transportation (Aviation and International Affairs)	Joel Szabat	January 2, 2019 (Confirmed January 2, 2019, voice vote)	January 20, 2021
Assistant Secretary of Transportation (Transportation Policy)	Finch Fulton	Nomination lapsed and returned to the President on January 3, 2021	
Assistant Secretary of Transportation (Government Affairs)	Adam J. Sullivan	February 28, 2018 (Confirmed February 13, 2018, voice vote)	January 20, 2021
Assistant Secretary of Transportation (Research and Technology)	Diana Furchtgott-Roth	Nomination lapsed and returned to the President on January 3, 2021	
Chief Financial Officer	John E. Kramer	December 16, 2019 (Confirmed November 21, 2019, voice vote)	January 20, 2021
Inspector General for the U.S. Department of Transportation	Eric J. Soskin	January 11, 2021	January 24, 2025
Inspector General for the U.S. Department of Transportation	Howard R. Elliott	May 16, 2020	January 11, 2021
Inspector General for the U.S. Department of Transportation	Mitch Behm	February 1, 2020	May 15, 2020
Federal Aviation Administration
Administrator of the Federal Aviation Administration	Stephen Dickson	August 12, 2019 (Confirmed July 24, 2019, 52–40)	March 31, 2022
Administrator of the Federal Aviation Administration	Daniel Elwell	January 6, 2018	August 12, 2019
Federal Highway Administration
Administrator of Federal Highway Administration	Nicole R. Nason	May 7, 2019 (Confirmed March 28, 2019, 95–1)	January 20, 2021
Administrator of Federal Highway Administration	Paul Trombino III	Nomination lapsed and returned to the President on January 3, 2018	
Administrator of Federal Highway Administration	Brandye Hendrickson	July 24, 2017	May 6, 2019
Federal Motor Carrier Safety Administration
Administrator of the Federal Motor Carrier Safety Administration	Wiley Deck	August 30, 2020	January 20, 2021
Administrator of the Federal Motor Carrier Safety Administration	Jim Mullen	October 31, 2019	August 29, 2020
Administrator of the Federal Motor Carrier Safety Administration	Raymond P. Martinez	February 28, 2018 (Confirmed February 13, 2018, voice vote)	October 31, 2019
Federal Railroad Administration
Administrator of the Federal Railroad Administration	Ronald Batory	February 28, 2018 (Confirmed February 13, 2018, voice vote)	January 20, 2021
Administrator of the Federal Railroad Administration	Juan D. Reyes III	February 10, 2018	February 28, 2018
Administrator of the Federal Railroad Administration	Heath Hall	2017	February 10, 2018
Administrator of the Federal Railroad Administration	Patrick T. Warren	2017	2017
Federal Transit Administration
Administrator of the Federal Transit Administration
Administrator of the Federal Transit Administration	Thelma Drake	Nomination lapsed and returned to the President on January 3, 2020	
Administrator of the Federal Transit Administration	K. Jane Williams	August 29, 2017	January 20, 2021
Administrator of the Federal Transit Administration	Matthew Welbes	January 20, 2017	August 29, 2017
National Highway Traffic Safety Administration
Administrator of Highway Traffic Safety Administration	James C. Owens	September 1, 2019	April 2020
Administrator of Highway Traffic Safety Administration	Heidi King	Nomination withdrawn by the President on September 19, 2019	
Administrator of Highway Traffic Safety Administration	Heidi King	September 2017	August 31, 2019
United States Maritime Administration
Administrator of the United States Maritime Administration	Mark H. Buzby	August 8, 2017 (Confirmed August 3, 2017, voice vote)	January 11, 2021
Pipeline and Hazardous Materials Safety Administration
Administrator of the Pipeline and Hazardous Materials Safety Administration	Howard R. Elliott	October 30, 2017 (Confirmed October 5, 2017, voice vote)	January 20, 2021

== Appointments (second administration) ==
Office	Nominee	Assumed office	Left office
Secretary of Transportation	Sean Duffy	January 28, 2025 (Confirmed January 28, 2025, 77–22)	
Secretary of Transportation	Judith Kaleta	January 20, 2025	January 28, 2025
Deputy Secretary of Transportation	Steven G. Bradbury	March 13, 2025 (Confirmed March 11, 2025, 51–46)	
General Counsel of Transportation	Greg Zerzan	October 8, 2025 (Confirmed* October 7, 2025, 51–47); *En bloc confirmation of 107 nominees.	
Under Secretary of Transportation for Policy	Ryan McCormack	March 26, 2026 (Confirmed* February 26, 2026, 57–33)	
Assistant Secretary of Transportation for Aviation and International Affairs	Daniel J. Edwards	May 19, 2026 (Confirmed* May 18, 2026, 46–43); *En bloc confirmation of 49 nominees.	
Assistant Secretary of Transportation for Aviation and International Affairs	Daniel J. Edwards	May 5, 2025	May 19, 2026
Assistant Secretary of Transportation for Research and Technology	Seval Oz	May 27, 2026 (Confirmed* May 18, 2026, 46-43); *En bloc confirmation of 49 nominees.	
Assistant Secretary of Transportation for Government Affairs	Leslie Becera	Awaiting Senate Confirmation	
Assistant Secretary of Transportation for Multimodal Freight, Infrastructure, and Policy	Michael Rutherford	October 9, 2025 (Confirmed* October 7, 2025, 51–47); *En bloc confirmation of 107 nominees.	
Assistant Secretary of Transportation for Transporation Policy	Loren Smith, Jr.	Awaiting Senate Confirmation	
Chief Financial Officer	Edward Eppler	August 25, 2026 (Confirmed* August 7, 2026, 51–47); *En bloc confirmation of 74 nominees.	
Federal Aviation Administration
Administrator of the Federal Aviation Administration	Bryan Bedford	July 10, 2025 (Confirmed July 9, 2025, 53–43)	
Administrator of the Federal Aviation Administration	Chris Rocheleau	January 30, 2025	July 10, 2025
Federal Highway Administration
Administrator of Federal Highway Administration	Sean McMaster	September 23, 2025 (Confirmed* September 18, 2025, 51–44); *En bloc confirmation of 48 nominees.	
National Highway Traffic Safety Administration
Administrator of Highway Traffic Safety Administration	Jonathan Morrison	September 22, 2025 (Confirmed* September 18, 2025, 51–44); *En bloc confirmation of 48 nominees.	
Federal Railroad Administration
Administrator of the Federal Railroad Administration	David Fink	November 20, 2025 (Confirmed* October 7, 2025, 51–47); *En bloc confirmation of 107 nominees.	
Administrator of the Federal Railroad Administration	Drew Feeley	April 30, 2025	November 20, 2025
Administrator of the Federal Railroad Administration	Michael Lestingi	January 20, 2025	April 30, 2025
Federal Transit Administration
Administrator of the Federal Transit Administration	Mark Aesch	Awaiting Senate Confirmation	
Administrator of the Federal Transit Administration	Matthew Welbes	February 20, 2026	April 3, 2026
Administrator of the Federal Transit Administration	Marc Molinaro	August 4, 2025 (Confirmed August 2, 2025, 71-23	February 20, 2026
Administrator of the Federal Transit Administration	Tariq Bokhari	May 1, 2025	August 4, 2025
Administrator of the Federal Transit Administration	Matthew Welbes	January 20, 2025	May 1, 2025
Deputy Administrator of the Federal Transit Administration	Tariq Bokhari	April 22, 2025 (appointed by President)	September 5, 2025
Federal Motor Carrier Safety Administration
Administrator of the Federal Motor Carrier Safety Administration	Derek Barrs	October 8, 2025 (Confirmed* October 7, 2025, 51–47); *En bloc confirmation of 107 nominees.	
Administrator of the Federal Motor Carrier Safety Administration	Jesse Ellison	July 23, 2025	October 8, 2025
Administrator of the Federal Motor Carrier Safety Administration	Sue Lawless	March 21, 2025	July 23, 2025
Administrator of the Federal Motor Carrier Safety Administration	Adrienne Camire	March 7, 2025	March 21, 2025
Administrator of the Federal Motor Carrier Safety Administration	Sue Lawless	January 20, 2025	March 7, 2025
United States Maritime Administration
Administrator of the United States Maritime Administration	Stephen Carmel	December 19, 2025 (Confirmed* December 18, 2025, 53–43); *En bloc confirmation of 97 nominees.	
Administrator of the United States Maritime Administration	Brent D. Sadler	Nomination withdrawn by the President on May 6, 2025	
Administrator of the United States Maritime Administration	Sang Yi	June 12, 2025	December 19, 2025
Pipeline and Hazardous Materials Safety Administration
Administrator of the Pipeline and Hazardous Materials Safety Administration	Paul Roberti	September 25, 2025 (Confirmed* September 18, 2025, 51–44); *En bloc confirmation of 48 nominees.	
Administrator of the Pipeline and Hazardous Materials Safety Administration	Ben Kochman	January 30, 2025	September 25, 2025
Administrator of the Pipeline and Hazardous Materials Safety Administration	Howard "Mac" McMillan	January 20, 2025	January 30, 2025

== Notes ==
=== Confirmation votes ===
Confirmations by roll call vote (first administration)

Confirmations by voice vote (first administration)

Confirmations by roll call vote (second administration)

Confirmations by voice vote (second administration)
