= Christopher Coes =

American political advisor (born 1984)

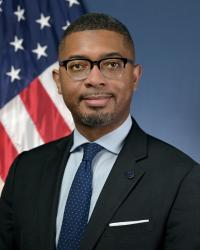

Assistant Secretary of Transportation for Transportation Policy
- In office June 24, 2022 – January 20, 2025
- President: Joe Biden

Under Secretary of Transportation for Policy
- Acting
- In office April 2024 – January 20, 2025
- President: Joe Biden
- Preceded by: Carlos Monje
- Succeeded by: Ryan McCormack
- In office January 20, 2021 – July 7, 2021
- Preceded by: Derek Kan
- Succeeded by: Carlos Monje

Personal details
- Born: 1984 (age 41–42)
- Education: St. John's University (BA, MA)

Christopher A. Coes is an American political advisor who served as the Assistant Secretary of Transportation for Transportation Policy from 2022 to 2025. On April 14, 2021, Coes was nominated to serve in that position. On April 22, 2021, his nomination was sent to the Senate. He was confirmed on May 26, 2022.

== Education ==
Coes earned a Bachelor of Arts and Master of Arts in politics and government from St. John's University.

== Career ==
After earning his master's degree, Coes worked as Transportation for America and the Democratic Congressional Campaign Committee. He was also a government affairs and campaign consultant for M+R Strategic Services. At Smart Growth America, Coes was vice president for real estate policy and external affairs and vice president for land use and development. Since 2016, Coes has been the COO of TOD Finance and Advisors, Inc. Since 2020, Coes has also been a professor at the George Washington University School of Business and a nonresident senior fellow at the Brookings Institution.
