= Jörg Sprave =

German YouTuber

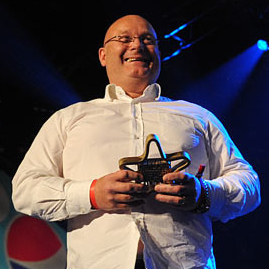
- Sprave in May 2014
- Born: 7 April 1965 (age 61); Dortmund, Germany

YouTube information
- Channel: JoergSprave
- Years active: 2008–present
- Genres: Weapons construction; tutorial; analysis
- Subscribers: 3.08 million
- Views: 617 million
- Last updated: 30 August 2026
- Website: slingshotchannel.com

Jörg Sprave (born 7 April 1965) is a German YouTuber, known for his (predominantly) English language channel JoergSprave (or The Slingshot Channel).

== Career ==
On his channel, Sprave produces and tests self-made, sometimes exotic slingshots and bows. Although most of his designs include at least one rubber band, the projectiles used vary according to the model. Some examples include saw blades, arrows and Oreo cookies. While mainly focusing on slingshots, Sprave occasionally makes, modifies and tests other weapons such as crossbows, knives and air guns. Sprave's designs have been the subject of numerous English-language reports, often highlighting their creativity or power, such as in Popular Mechanics, Gizmodo, and UPI. As of November 2026, the channel has over 3 million subscribers. The videos, which are nearly universally in English, are viewed mostly in the United States, the source of the majority of his subscribers.

Sprave is known for the invention of the "Instant Legolas", an add-on magazine device for a bow which converts it into a repeating-style weapon, firing up to five arrows per magazine. It was first introduced in his YouTube video entitled "'Instant Legolas' - Archery Reinvented", uploaded on 6 August 2017. A commercial version, "The Fenris", was released in June 2020, made by Steambow, an Austrian crossbow manufacturer, and sold by GoGuns GmbH.

On 2 March 2018 Sprave started a labor union for YouTubers together with the largest German union, IG Metall, called FairTube. The goal is to improve transparency and fairness for YouTube creators against unfair demonetization and banning. The union hopes to force changes to YouTube policies using the GDPR, which requires transparency in dealing with personal data, which the union argues includes moderation decisions and categorization.

== Personal life ==
Sprave expressed an interest in slingshots from an early age, and sold some of his own creations to classmates in school. Sprave holds a degree in economics from the Universität Paderborn. Since 1989, Sprave has been on the board of directors of MacroSystem Digital Video AG, a manufacturer of video editing software, including the Casablanca video editor. For some time, Sprave worked on his channel full-time, but out of fear of financial dependence on Google, he turned to a part-time video production schedule in September 2015. On 1 January 2017, he reinstated his position as a full-time YouTube creator and as a partner for the channel's online store, which was incorporated into the "GoGun GmbH" in May 2017. Sprave became CEO of the GoGun GmbH in December 2017.

== Awards ==
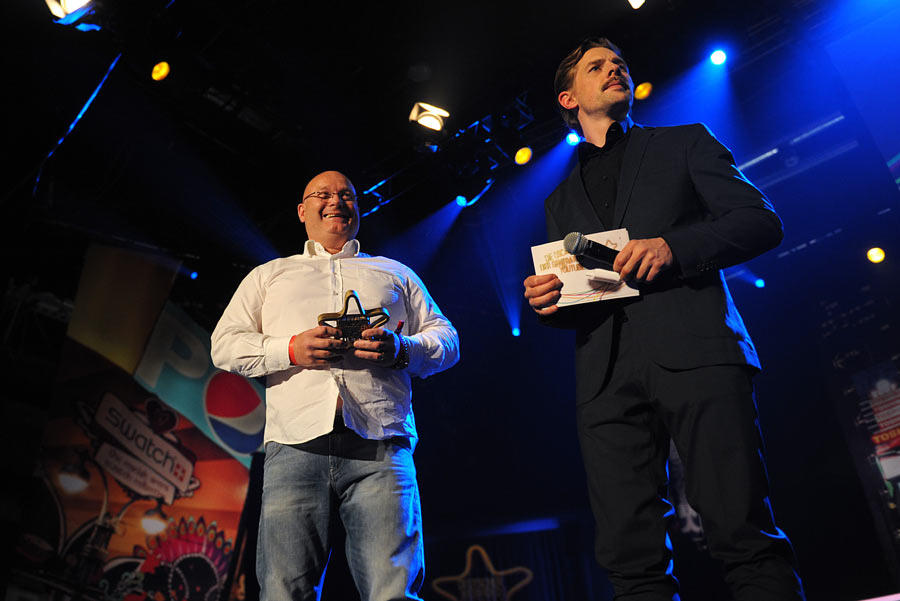
Sprave receiving a Webvideopreis Deutschland award in 2014

Sprave's winning video for the Bill & Melinda Gates Foundation Condom-Challenge consisted of the design of a slingshot for condoms. As of April 2017, the video remains one of his most popular clips with more than 6.1 million views.

| Year | Award | Category | For | Result | Ref. |
|---|---|---|---|---|---|
| 2014 | German Webvideo Prize (Deutscher Webvideopreis) | OMG | Bill Gates Calls – The Slingshot Channel Answers | Won | |
