= Censorship by Google =

Google and its subsidiary companies, such as YouTube, have removed or omitted information from its services in order to comply with company policies, legal demands, and government censorship laws.

Numerous governments have asked Google to censor content. In 2012, Google ruled in favor of more than half the requests they received via court orders and phone calls. This did not include China or Iran, who completely blocked the site or one of its subsidiary companies.

As of 2025, Google continues to receive hundreds of thousands of removal requests annually from governments worldwide, most commonly related to national security, copyright, or defamation, and regularly reviews each request for compliance with its policies.

== Google AdSense ==
In February 2003, Google stopped showing advertisements from Oceana, a non-profit organization protesting against a major cruise ship operation's sewage treatment practices. Google, citing its editorial policy, stated that "Google does not accept advertising if the ad or site advocates against other individuals, groups, or organizations."

In April 2008, Google refused to run ads for a UK Christian group opposed to abortion, explaining that "At this time, Google policy does not permit the advertisement of websites that contain 'abortion and religion'".

In April 2014, Google removed ads for certain crisis pregnancy centers following an investigation by NARAL. Research across 70 U.S. cities found that, among "abortion clinic" search results, 79% of the Google ads reviewed violated its policy against deceptive advertising. According to NARAL, people using Google to search for abortion clinics were shown advertisements for anti-abortion crisis pregnancy centers. Google stated that it constantly reviews ads for policy violations and, if found, takes appropriate actions, including disabling or blacklisting accounts, as quickly as possible.

In September 2018, Google removed a paid advertisement from YouTube made by supporters of Russian opposition who urged Russians to participate in a protest set on September 9. Russia's Central Election Commission earlier sent a request to Google to remove the advertisement, saying it violated election laws that call for a "day of silence" on election matters ahead of voting, but the advertisement was blocked even in regions with no voting set on September 9 and in regions where authorities had authorized the pension-reform protests.

== Google Lens ==
Google states that Google Lens identifies and filters sexually explicit results in order to make its results "relevant, helpful and safe", using Google-wide standards including its SafeSearch guidelines. Lens can otherwise be used for reverse image searches, with results potentially including similar images and websites containing the same or a similar image.

== Google Maps ==
In March 2007, the lower-resolution satellite imagery on Google Maps showing post-Hurricane Katrina damage in Louisiana, US, was allegedly replaced with higher resolution images from before the storm. Google's official blog post in April revealed that the imagery was still available in KML format on Google Earth or Google Maps.

In March 2008, Google removed Street View and 360° images of military bases per the Pentagon's request.

To protect the privacy and anonymity of individuals, Google selectively blurred photographs containing car license number plates and faces in Google Street View. Users may request further blurring of images that feature them, their family, their car, or their home. Users can also request the removal of images that feature what Google terms "inappropriate content," which falls under their categories of intellectual property violations; sexually explicit content; illegal, dangerous, or violent content; child endangerment; hate speech; harassment and threats; and personal or confidential information. In some countries (e.g. Germany), Google modifies images of specific buildings. In the United States, Google Street View adjusts or omits certain images deemed of interest to national security by the federal government.

In South Korea, Google Maps historically lacked functions available in most other countries, including full turn-by-turn navigation, because the South Korean government restricted the export of high-precision geographic data to Google's (and similar companies) overseas servers on national-security grounds. Google already licensed domestic mapping data but could not process it through its global server network, while South Korean mapping services such as Naver and Kakao could use the data on domestic servers. In February 2026, the South Korean government conditionally approved Google's export of 1:5,000-scale mapping data, subject to security requirements including masking sensitive facilities, restrictions on displaying precise coordinates, and domestic processing of the original data.

== Google Search ==
In the United States, Google commonly filters search results to comply with Digital Millennium Copyright Act (DMCA)-related legal complaints.

In the United Kingdom, it was reported that Google had "delisted" Inquisition 21, a website that claims to challenge moral authoritarian and sexually absolutist ideas in the United Kingdom. Google later released a press statement suggesting Inquisition 21 had attempted to manipulate search results. In Germany and France, a study reported that approximately 113 white nationalist, Nazi, antisemitic, Islamic extremist, and other similar websites had been removed from the German and French versions of Google. Google has complied with these laws by not including sites containing such material in its search results. However, Google does list the number of excluded results at the bottom of the search result page and links to Lumen (formerly, Chilling Effects) for an explanation.

=== Lolicon content ===
As of 18 April 2010, Google censors "lolicon", a Japanese term meaning "attractive young girls", on its search results, hiding results regarding lolicon material, even if the user types words along with the term which would typically lead to explicit content results; the terms "loli" and "lolita" also suffer from censorship in regards to this content.

=== Removal of SafeSearch options ===
Google SafeSearch was first introduced in 1999 as a tool to help users filter out explicit content such as pornography or violence from search results. Some users have stated that SafeSearch's lack of a completely unfiltered option amounts to censorship by Google. A Google spokesperson disagreed, saying that Google is "not censoring any adult content," but "want to show users exactly what they are looking for—but [Google policies] aim not to show sexually-explicit results unless a user is specifically searching for them".

=== Online pharmacies ===
Following a settlement with the Food and Drug Administration (FDA) ending Google Adwords' advertising of Canadian pharmacies that permitted Americans to access cheaper prescriptions, Google agreed to several compliances and reporting measures to limit the visibility of "rogue pharmacies". Google and other members of the Center for Safe Internet Pharmacies are collaborating to remove illegal pharmacies from search results and participating in "Operation Pangea" with the FDA and Interpol.

=== Search suggestions ===
In January 2010, Google was reported to have stopped providing automatic suggestions for any search beginning with the term "Islam is", while it continued to do so for other major religions. According to Wired.com, a Google spokesperson stated, "This is a bug and we're working to fix it as quickly as we can." Suggestions for "Islam is" were available later that month. Nonetheless, Google continues to filter certain words from autocomplete suggestions, describing them as "potentially inappropriate".

The publication 2600: The Hacker Quarterly has compiled a list of words that are restricted by Google Instant. These are terms that the company's Instant Search feature will not search. Most terms are often vulgar and derogatory in nature, but some apparently irrelevant searches including "Myleak" are removed.

As of 26 January 2011, Google's Autocomplete feature would not complete certain words such as "BitTorrent," "Torrent," "uTorrent," "Megaupload," and "Rapidshare", and Google actively censored search terms or phrases that its algorithm considered likely constituting spam or intending to manipulate search results.

In September 2012, multiple sources reported that Google had removed "bisexual" from its list of blacklisted terms for Instant Search.

In December 2022, Google was reported to have stopped providing automatic suggestions for any search with the term "protests in China", while it continued to do so for other countries.

=== Ungoogleable ===
In 2013, the Language Council of Sweden included the Swedish version of the word ungoogleable (ogooglebar) in its list of new words. It had "defined the term as something that cannot be found with any search engine". Google objected to this definition, wanting it to only refer to Google searches, and the Council removed it in order to avoid a legal confrontation, and accused Google of trying to "control the Swedish language".

=== Leaked celebrity content ===
On 31 August 2014, almost 200 private pictures of various celebrities containing nudity and explicit content were made public on certain websites. Google removed most search results that linked users directly to such content shortly after.

=== COVID-19 pandemic-related content ===
An Australian study found Google search results relating to COVID-19 were heavily curated, with no indication given to users that such curation was happening. Google removed autocomplete suggestions for searches related to the COVID-19 lab leak theory.

=== International ===
==== Australia ====
In January 2010, Google Australia removed links to satirical website Encyclopedia Dramatica's "Aboriginal" article, citing it as a violation of Australia's Racial Discrimination Act. After the website's domain change in 2011, the article resurfaced in Google Australia's search results.

==== Canada ====
On 13 June 2014, the Supreme Court of British Columbia ordered Google to globally de-index websites operated by Datalink Technologies. The dispute began when Equustek Solutions sued its distributor, Datalink, for stealing technological designs, product blueprints, and using deceptive marketing to sell counterfeit network devices online. Datalink subsequently ignored initial court orders, shut down its physical operations, and fled the jurisdiction to operate anonymously online. Google voluntarily removed 345 specific links from its Canadian domain (google.ca), but Datalink bypassed this by generating new web pages, rendering localized suppression ineffective. Google resisted a worldwide ban, arguing it would overextend Canadian legal reach; however, the court rejected these arguments and granted Google 14 days to comply globally.

Google appealed the global order up to the Supreme Court of Canada, which affirmed the global injunction in June 2017. Rather than complying globally, Google filed a lawsuit in the United States District Court for the Northern District of California. In November 2017, the U.S. court granted an injunction blocking the enforcement of the Canadian order within the United States, ruling that it violated the First Amendment and Section 230 of the Communications Decency Act. Google subsequently applied to the British Columbia Supreme Court to vacate or vary the global injunction based on the American ruling, but the application was dismissed in April 2018, leaving a legal standoff where the links remained blocked globally except within the United States.

==== China ====
Google adhered to the Internet censorship policies of China, enforced by means of filters colloquially known as "The Great Firewall," until March 2010. Google.cn search results were filtered to not display any results perceived to be harmful to the Chinese Communist Party (CCP). Google claimed that some censorship was necessary in order to keep the Chinese government from blocking Google entirely, which had happened in 2002.

Google claimed it did not plan to give the government information about users who searched for blocked content and would inform users that content had been restricted if they attempt to search for it. As of 2009, Google was the only major China-based search engine to explicitly inform the user when search results were blocked or hidden. As of December 2012, Google no longer informs the user of possible censorship for certain queries during a search. The Chinese government had restricted citizens' access to popular search engines such as AltaVista, Yahoo, and Google in the past, though the complete ban has since been lifted. However, the government remains active in filtering Internet content. In October 2005, the Blogger platform and access to the Google cache was made available in mainland China; however, in December 2005, some mainland Chinese Blogger users reported that their access to the site was once again restricted.

In January 2006, Google agreed that China's version of Google, Google.cn, would filter certain keywords given to it by the Chinese government. Google pledged to tell users when search results are censored and said that it would not "maintain any services that involve personal or confidential data, such as Gmail or Blogger, on the mainland". Google said that it does not plan to give the government information about users who search for blocked content and will inform users that content has been restricted if they attempt to search for it. Searchers may encounter a message which states: "In accordance with local laws and policies, some of the results have not been displayed." Google issued a statement saying that "removing search results is inconsistent with Google's mission" but that the alternative—being shut down entirely and thereby "providing no information (or a heavily degraded user experience that amounts to no information) is more inconsistent with our mission." Initially, both the censored Google.cn and the uncensored Chinese-language Google.com were available. In June 2006, however, China blocked Google.com again.

Some Chinese Internet users were critical of Google for assisting the Chinese government in repressing its own citizens, particularly those dissenting against the government and advocating for human rights. Furthermore, Google had been denounced and called hypocritical by the Free Media Movement and Reporters Without Borders for agreeing to China's demands while simultaneously fighting the United States government's requests for similar information. Google China had also been condemned by Reporters Without Borders, Human Rights Watch, and Amnesty International.

On 14 February 2006, protesters organized a "mass breakup with Google" whereby users agreed to boycott Google on Valentine's Day to show their disapproval of the Google China policy.

In June 2009, Google was ordered by the Chinese government to block various overseas websites, including some with sexually explicit content. Google was criticized by the China Illegal Information Reporting Center (CIIRC) for allowing search results that included content that was sexual in nature, and claimed the company was a dissemination channel for a "huge amount of pornography and lewd content".

On 12 January 2010, in response to an apparent hacking of Google's servers in an attempt to access information about Chinese dissidents, Google announced that "we are no longer willing to continue censoring our results on Google.cn, and so over the next few weeks we will be discussing with the Chinese government the basis on which we could operate an unfiltered search engine within the law, if at all."

On 22 March 2010, after talks with Chinese authorities failed to reach an agreement, the company redirected its censor-complying Google China service to its Google Hong Kong service, which is outside the jurisdiction of Chinese censorship laws. However, at least as of March 23, 2010, "The Great Firewall" continues to censor search results from the Hong Kong portal, www.google.com.hk (as it does with the US portal, www.google.com) for controversial terms such as "Falun gong" and "the June 4th incident" (1989 Tiananmen Square protests and massacre).

In August 2018, it was revealed that Google was working on a version of its search engine for use in China, which would censor content according to the restrictions placed by the Chinese government. This project was worked on by a small percentage of the company and was codenamed Dragonfly. A number of Google employees expressed their concern about the project, and several resigned. In 2019, Google's vice president of public policy, Karan Bhatia, testified before the U.S. Senate Judiciary Committee that the Dragonfly project had been terminated.

In February 2023, Radio Free Asia reported that YouTube content satirizing General Secretary of the Chinese Communist Party Xi Jinping is routinely targeted for takedowns using YouTube's copyright infringement reporting system.

On 15 February 2025, The Guardian issued a report indicating that Google China had removed content such as YouTube videos of anti-state protesters or content that criticises and alleges corruption among their politicians. At the request of the ministry of public security in China, which oversees the police and domestic political spying networks, Google took down more than 200 videos. The ministry had requested removals for 412, of which 346 "contained allegations about corruption within the political system in the People's Republic of China or stories about top government officials". Google also assisted in China's crackdown on free speech, removing profiles that impersonated the CCP General Secretary, Xi Jinping. Online impersonation accounts were banned in 2015 after Chinese citizens used them to covertly criticise Xi and to circumvent censorship laws, which are some of the world's most prohibitive.

==== European Union ====
In July 2014, Google began removing certain search results from its search engines in the European Union in response to requests under the right to be forgotten. Articles whose links were removed, when searching for specific personal names, included a 2007 blog by the BBC journalist Robert Peston about Stanley O'Neal, a former chairman of investment bank Merrill Lynch, being forced out after the bank made huge losses. Peston criticized Google for "...cast[ing him] into oblivion".

The Guardian reported that six of its articles, including three relating to a former Scottish football referee, had been "hidden". Other articles, including one about French office workers using post-it notes and another about a collapsed fraud trial of a solicitor standing for election to the Law Society's ruling body, were affected.

Sky News Australia reported that a story about Kelly Osbourne falling ill on the set of Fashion Police in 2013 had been removed.

The Oxford Mail reported that its publishers had been notified by Google about the removal of links to the story of a conviction for shoplifting in 2006. The paper said it was not known who had asked Google to remove the search result, but there had been a previous complaint to the Press Complaints Commission (PCC) in 2010 concerning its accuracy, claimed that the report was causing "embarrassment", and requested that the story be taken off the paper's website. The paper said two factual amendments were made to the article and the PCC dismissed the complaint.

An article about the conversion to Islam of the brother of George Osborne, the Chancellor of the Exchequer, was removed after a request to Google from an unknown person under the right-to-be-forgotten ruling.

The Telegraph reported that links to a report on its website about claims that a former Law Society chief faked complaints against his deputy were hidden. The search results for the articles for the same story in the Guardian and The Independent were also removed. The Independent reported that its article, together with an article on the Indian Ocean tsunami in 2004 and one on new trends in sofa design in 1998, had been removed. The Telegraph also reported that links to articles concerning a student's 2008 drunk-driving conviction and a 2001 case that resulted in two brothers each receiving nine-month jail terms for affray had been removed.

The Spanish newspaper El Mundo reported that some results were hidden over a 2008 news report of a Spanish Supreme Court ruling involving executives of Riviera Coast Invest who were involved in a mortgage mis-selling scandal.

On 5 July 2014, German news magazine Der Spiegel reported removal of a search result to an article about Scientology.

On 19 August 2014, the BBC reported that Google had removed 12 links to stories on BBC News.

==== Germany and France ====
On 22 October 2002, a study reported that approximately 113 Internet sites had been removed from the German and French versions of Google. This censorship mainly affected white nationalist, Nazi, antisemitic, Islamic extremist websites, and at least one fundamentalist Christian website. Under French and German law, hate speech and Holocaust denial are illegal. In the case of Germany, violent or sex-related sites such as YouPorn and BME that the Bundesprüfstelle für jugendgefährdende Medien deems harmful to youth are also censored.

Google has complied with these laws by not including sites containing such material in its search results. However, Google does list the number of excluded results at the bottom of the search result page and links to Lumen (formerly known as Chilling Effects) for explanation.

==== India ====
In September 2016, the Ministry of Health and Family Welfare revealed that Google had agreed to censor search results and advertising of prenatal sex discernment, which is illegal in India.

==== Israel ====
Since 2015, Google removed certain search results that were defamatory in nature from its search engine in Israel following gag orders.

==== Russia ====
In the four years from June 2020 to June 2024, Russia accounted for more than 60% of takedown requests. The country's internet censor, Roskomnadzor, is one of the government agencies that corresponds most frequently with Google – and has earned the nickname "Rosco" in some of its reports. Google removed a YouTube video that allegedly exposed "corruption among politicians" and made "some rhetorical threats of violent action against the alleged corrupt politicians."

Russian citizens were also prevented from viewing certain posts on the company's Blogger platform, which "included criticism of Russian military history and policy, and Russian patriotic holidays. It also incited violence against residents of a Russian town," the report said.

In 2022, the Company censored multiple YouTube videos calling for protests against the Russian Federation. Other pieces of content that criticised Putin, including the late Russian opposition leader Alexei Navalny's tactical voting recommendations, were temporarily blocked during the September 2021 election period. Roskomnadzor "and other Russian government entities" also asked that Google removed Navalny's Smart Voting app from its Play Store, which it did.

==== South Korea ====
In 2007, Google Korea introduced an age verification system for searches involving adult content in order to comply with South Korean regulations. Searches containing any of approximately 700 Korean terms designated as adult by the South Korean government produced results filtered by SafeSearch unless the user verified that they were at least 19 years old. At the time, verification required a user's name and resident registration number. Google implemented the system on 1 September 2007. Google continues to require users in South Korea to verify that they are at least 19 to view adult search results, with verification now conducted using personal information associated with a South Korean mobile phone account.

Google continues to require age verification to display adult search results to users in South Korea. Google's filtering applies to all users in South Korea, but the identity mechanism required to lift that filtering depends on a Korean mobile-identity infrastructure to which short-term visitors do not have the same access. Its verification system requires a South Korean mobile phone number and asks users to identify whether they are South Korean citizens; this has been described as particularly cumbersome for short-term visitors.

==== Sweden ====
In March 2018, Google delisted a WordPress hosted site from search results in Sweden, following an intense media frenzy targeted against Google, YouTube, and Facebook by the tabloid Expressen and the daily newspaper Dagens Nyheter. The WordPress site lists Swedish Jews in the public sphere, and also agitates against the dominant publishing house Bonnier Group, the owner of both newspapers.

Although perfectly legal in Sweden, the WordPress site was described as antisemitic. The Bonnier papers argued that Google should not promote such content and above all not at a high rank. Ministers in the Swedish green-left government agreed with this sentiment, and threatened with national and EU regulation unless Google adapt its algorithms and delist contents of "threats and hate" (hot och hat). Google eventually delisted the site in Sweden due to copyright claims.

Said papers also targeted the YouTube channel Granskning Sverige (Scrutiny Sweden) for its alleged extreme right-wing contents. The channel was described as a "troll factory", where members called authorities, journalists and other public figures, and recut the recorded interviews to make them fit the channel's right-wing extremist world view. The interviews were broadcast against a black backdrop with the channel logotype, and the occasional use of screen dumps from newspaper articles related to the interviews. Google eventually complied with the demands, and closed the channel, citing copyright infringement and violation of terms of agreement.

On April 13, 2018, Google took part in a meeting with the Swedish government, to discuss the search company's role in the media landscape. Minister of Justice, Morgan Johansson (Social Democrats), and Minister of Digitization, Peter Eriksson (Green Party), expressed concerns that "unlawful" and "harmful" content was facilitated by Google, and that "trolls" could have a negative impact on the upcoming Swedish parliamentary election. Google agreed to refine its algorithms, and also hire more staff to make sure "threats and hate" are eliminated from Google search and YouTube videos. Critics have voiced concerns that private international companies are mandated to put censorship into effect to comply with local regulations without guidance from courts, and that free speech is deteriorating at an accelerating rate.

==== United Kingdom ====
On 21 September 2006, it was reported that Google had "delisted" Inquisition 21, a website that claims to challenge moral authoritarian and sexually absolutist ideas in the United Kingdom. According to Inquisition 21, Google was acting "in support of a campaign by law enforcement agencies in the US and the UK to suppress emerging information about their involvement in major malpractice", allegedly exposed by their own investigation of any legal action against those who carried out Operation Ore, a far-reaching and much-criticized law enforcement campaign against the viewers of child pornography. Google released a press statement suggesting Inquisition 21 had attempted to manipulate search results.

==== United States ====
Google commonly removes search results to comply with Digital Millennium Copyright Act (DMCA)-related legal complaints.

In 2002, "in an apparent response to criticism of its handling of a threatening letter from a Church of Scientology lawyer," Google began to make DMCA "takedown" letters public, posting such notices on the Chilling Effects archive (now Lumen), which archives legal threats made against Internet users and Internet sites.

In mid-2016, Google conducted a two-month standoff with writer Dennis Cooper after deleting his Blogger and Gmail accounts without warning or explanation following a single anonymous complaint. The case drew worldwide media attention, and finally resulted in Google returning Cooper's content to him.

In mid-2018, Google permanently barred conspiracy theorist Alex Jones from using its subsidiary company YouTube. Jones' channel InfoWars responded by "accusing the companies of censorship".

In mid-2019, Google allegedly suspended Tulsi Gabbard's advertisements for her presidential campaign, while the candidate was at the height of public interest. Gabbard sued Google for $50 million in damages.

In 2025, after an investigation by the House of Representatives' Committee on the Judiciary, Google offered several banned users the opportunity to return to YouTube and reinstate their account.

=== Global blocking ===
In June 2017, the Canadian supreme court ruled that Google can be forced to remove search results worldwide. Civil liberties groups including Human Rights Watch, the BC Civil Liberties Association, and the Electronic Frontier Foundation argue that this would set a precedent for Internet censorship. In an appeal, Google argued that the global reach of the order was unnecessary and that it raised concerns over freedom of expression. While the court writes that "[They] have not, to date, accepted that freedom of expression requires the facilitation of the unlawful sale of goods", OpenMedia spokesman, David Christopher, warns that "there is great risk that governments and commercial entities will see this ruling as justifying censorship requests that could result in perfectly legal and legitimate content disappearing off the web because of a court order in the opposite corner of the globe".

=== Refresh Outdated Content vulnerability ===
After journalist Jack Poulson discovered that articles he had published about tech CEO Delwin Maurice Blackman's domestic violence arrest had been removed from Google (following attempts through legal pressure and bribery to remove the articles), the Freedom of the Press Foundation investigated and found that Google's 'Refresh Outdated Content' tool had been exploited to suppress his articles & others in major publications from appearing in Google search results. Google have stated that the vulnerability that allowed abuse of the tool has been corrected.

== Google Play ==
On September 17, 2021, Google removed the Smart Voting app used by the Russian opposition to coordinate its voting strategy against the ruling United Russia party during elections. The app was removed following threats from the Russian government.

Google was reported to have removed Red Dot, an app similar to ICEBlock.

== YouTube ==
YouTube, a video sharing website and subsidiary of Google, in its Terms of Service, prohibits the posting of videos which violate copyrights or depict pornography, illegal acts, gratuitous violence, hate speech, and what it deems to be misinformation about COVID-19. User-posted videos that violate such terms may be removed and replaced with a message that reads, "This video has been removed due to a violation of our Terms of Service."

=== General censorship ===
In 2006, Thailand blocked access to YouTube after identifying 20 offensive videos it ordered the site to remove. In 2007, a Turkish judge ordered YouTube to be blocked in the country due to videos insulting Mustafa Kemal Atatürk, the founder of the Republic of Turkey (which falls under Article 301 prohibitions on insulting the Turkish nation).

In September 2007, YouTube blocked the account of Wael Abbas, an Egyptian activist who posted videos of police brutality, voting irregularities and antigovernmental demonstrations under the Mubarak regime. Shortly afterward, his account was subsequently restored, along with 187 of his videos.

In February 2008, the Pakistan Telecommunications Authority banned YouTube in the country, but the manner in which it performed the block accidentally prevented access to the website worldwide for several hours. The ban was lifted after YouTube removed controversial religious comments made by a Dutch government official concerning Islam.

In October 2008, YouTube removed a video by Pat Condell titled "Welcome to Saudi Britain"; in response, his fans re-uploaded the video themselves and the National Secular Society wrote to YouTube in protest.

In 2016, YouTube launched a localized Pakistani version of its website for the users in Pakistan in order to censor content considered blasphemous by the Pakistan government as a part of its deal with the latter. As a result, the three-year ban on YouTube by the Pakistan government was subsequently lifted.

In July 2017, YouTube began modifying suggested videos to debunk terrorist ideologies. In August 2017, YouTube wrote a blog post explaining a new "limited state" for religious and controversial videos, which would not allow comments, likes, monetization, and suggested videos.

In October 2017, PragerU sued YouTube, alleging violations of their freedom of speech under the First Amendment via YouTube's "arbitrary and capricious use of 'restricted mode' and 'demonetization' viewer restriction filters" to suppress their content. A U.S. district appeals court threw out the suit in February 2020, stating that despite "[its] ubiquity and its role as a public-facing platform", YouTube was still considered a private platform (the First Amendment only applies to state actors).

In December 2017, what YouTubers referred to as the "AdPocalypse" took place, with YouTube's automated content policing tool began demonetizing content that ran afoul of the company's very-broad "Not Advertiser-Friendly" category. The following April, numerous firearm-related channels began encountering additional policing by YouTube when new rules restricting videos "that facilitate private gun sales or link to websites that sell guns" were enacted. As a result, popular firearms vlogger Hickok45's account was deleted (and subsequently reinstated after an outcry).

In March 2018, The Atlantic found that YouTube had delisted a video where journalist Daniel Lombroso reported a speech by white nationalist Richard B. Spencer at the 2016 annual conference of the National Policy Institute, where they celebrated Donald Trump's win at the presidential election. YouTube relisted the video after The Atlantic sent a complaint.

On June 5, 2019, YouTube updated its hate speech policy to prohibit hateful and supremacist work, and limit the spread of violent extremist content online. The policy extends to content that justifies discrimination, segregation, or exclusion based on qualities like age, gender, race, caste, religion, sexual orientation, or veteran status. It covers videos that, for example, include Nazi ideology, Holocaust denial, Sandy Hook conspiracy theories, or flat Earth theories. The policy also aims at reducing borderline content and harmful misinformation, such as videos promoting phony miracle cures for serious illnesses.

In February 2020, YouTube reportedly began censoring any content related to the novel coronavirus (SARS-CoV-2) by removal or demonetization of the channel, citing the "sensitive topics" advertiser-friendly content guideline on Twitter.

In 2020, Republican senator Rand Paul criticized YouTube for removing a video of his floor speech which named the alleged Ukraine whistleblower.

In early February 2021, YouTube removed raw footage taken of the 2021 storming of the United States Capitol by independent journalists like Ford Fischer from News2Share or from progressive media outlets such as Status Coup citing that the videos violated its policies on misinformation. The same footage from the outlets was reused by large media organizations and still up on their YouTube accounts. Some independent journalists including Fischer and other progressive outlets like The Progressive Soap Box (host Jamarl Thomas), Political Vigilante (Graham Elwood), Franc Analysis and The Convo Couch were demonetized by YouTube with some having their superchat feature blocked. Fischer was later remonetized by YouTube after it acknowledged "over-enforcement".

In September 2025, Google revealed a policy shift that could potentially revive previously suspended YouTube accounts, acknowledging that it had removed certain content and blocked specific YouTube channels at the request of the Biden administration, primarily targeting content related to COVID-19. The policy change may have far-reaching implications for both ordinary users and prominent figures who were previously banned from YouTube for sharing content that didn't abide by the platform's rules, potentially leading to reinstatement for high-profile individuals such as Dan Bongino, Sebastian Gorka, and Steve Bannon, who had their accounts suspended by Google in the past. The policy change was triggered by a Republican investigation into whether tech companies were suppressing free speech on their platforms at the behest of the Biden administration. Google acknowledged that the administration had exerted pressure on the company to censor American voices and remove content that conformed to YouTube's rules. Alphabet said that government attempts to dictate what speech to police on its platforms are "unacceptable and wrong", and that Google historically resisted these efforts in the name of protecting free speech.

=== Shadowbanning of comments ===
Comments on YouTube are said to be frequently shadowbanned without the poster even being informed of it.

Once posted, the comment appears but immediately disappears when the page is refreshed.

=== China-related content ===
At least since October 2019, YouTube has been automatically deleting any comments that contain the Chinese terms for "50 Cent Party" (五毛党) and its shortened version "50 Cent" (五毛). They have also been deleting any comments referring to the Chinese Communist Party (CCP) as "bandits" (共匪). In May 2020, YouTube made a statement to The Verge that these deletions were made "in error".

In June 2021, MIT Technology Review and Reuters reported that YouTube removed videos of a human rights group documenting testimonies of the persecution of Uyghurs in China.

In October 2023, Radio Free Asia reported that YouTube repeatedly removed channels satirizing General Secretary of the Chinese Communist Party Xi Jinping on the grounds of "cyberbullying".

=== Advertiser-friendly content ===
YouTube policies restrict certain forms of content from being included in videos being monetized with advertising, including strong violence, language, sexual content, and "controversial or sensitive subjects and events, including subjects related to wars, political conflicts, natural disasters, and tragedies, even if graphic imagery is not shown", unless the content is "usually newsworthy or comedic and the creator's intent is to inform or entertain".

On August 31, 2016, YouTube introduced a new system to notify users of violations of the "advertiser-friendly content" rules, and allow them to appeal. Following its introduction, many prominent YouTube users began to accuse the site of engaging in de facto censorship, arbitrarily disabling monetization on videos discussing various topics such as skincare, politics, and LGBTQ history. Philip DeFranco argued that not being able to earn money from a video was "censorship by a different name", while Vlogbrothers similarly pointed out that YouTube had flagged both "Zaatari: thoughts from a refugee camp" and "Vegetables that look like penises" (although the flagging on the former was eventually overturned). The hashtag "#YouTubeIsOverParty" was prominently used on Twitter as a means of discussing the controversy. A YouTube spokesperson stated that "[w]hile [their] policy of demonetizing videos due to advertiser-friendly concerns hasn't changed, [they've] recently improved the notification and appeal process to ensure better communication to [their] creators."

In March 2017, a number of major advertisers and prominent companies began to pull their advertising campaigns from YouTube over concerns that their ads were appearing on objectionable and/or extremist content, in what the YouTube community began referring to as a "boycott". YouTube personality PewDiePie described these boycotts as an "adpocalypse", noting that his video revenue had fallen to the point that he was generating more revenue from YouTube Red subscription profit sharing (which is divided based on views by subscribers) than advertising. On 6 April 2017, YouTube announced planned changes to its Partner Program, restricting new membership to vetted channels with a total of at least 10,000 video views. YouTube stated that the changes were made in order to "ensure revenue only flows to creators who are playing by the rules".

In addition to moderation of content creators, YouTube also moderates each video's comments section. From October 2024 to December 2024, YouTube removed over a billion comments. Of those comments, 99.7% were deleted automatically. The most common reason for deletion was identification as spam, a scam, or otherwise misleading (81.7%), followed by identification as harassment/cyberbullying (6.6%). False positives have led users to speculate on the criteria of deletion, leading to a rise in video creation suggesting possible answers to meet demand. Common answers include similarity of comments between videos (spam-like), external links (though the channel owner has the option prohibit use of any links), or use of words prohibited by YouTube or the channel owner. A post may be held from publication until the channel owner has reviewed it. A comment may be visible to its author but no one else, leaving the author with the false impression that community rules are being met. In a different account, the comment may be visible only in a 'Newest First' sort, or not at all. Deletions are also account-dependent: in the same comment thread, the removal of a word may be needed for a post to be published, despite another account already having used it with consequence. Further confounding the chore of determining prohibited words is fractional prohibition, that is, several loaded words in separate posts might not lead to the posts' deletion, but their aggregation into one post may crest a threshold that does. Also, an account used to downvote comments and videos may be shielded from seeing comments that others have reported—not the result people likely intend when they report a post as spam or offensive. Thus viewing from Account 1 to test if a comment by Account 2 was deleted might yield a false positive. Account 3 might still see Account 2's comment if Account 3 never votes down.

=== Censorship of LGBT content in Restricted Mode ===
In March 2017, the "Restricted Mode" feature was criticized by YouTube's LGBT community for filtering videos that discuss issues of human sexuality and sexual and gender identity, even when there is no explicit references to sexual intercourse or otherwise inappropriate content. Rapper Mykki Blanco told The Guardian that such restrictions are used to make LGBT vloggers feel "policed and demeaned" and "sends a clear homophobic message that the fact that my video displays unapologetic queer imagery means it's slapped with an 'age restriction', while other cis, overly sexualised heteronormative work" remain uncensored. Musicians Tegan and Sara similarly argued that LGBT people "shouldn't be restricted", after acknowledging that the mode had censored several of their music videos.

YouTube later stated that a technical error on Restricted Mode wrongfully impacted "hundreds of thousands" LGBT-related videos.

=== False positives ===
In February 2019, automated filters accidentally flagged several channels with videos discussing the AR mobile game Pokémon Go and the massively multiplayer online game Club Penguin for containing prohibited sexual content, as some of their videos contained references to "CP" in their title. In Pokémon Go, "CP" is an abbreviation of "Combat Power"—a level system in the game, and "CP" is an abbreviation of Club Penguin, but it was believed that YouTube's filters had accidentally interpreted it as referring to child pornography. The affected channels were restored, and YouTube apologized for the inconvenience.

In August 2019, YouTube mistakenly took down robot fighting videos for violating its policies against animal cruelty.

== 2007 anti-censorship shareholder initiative ==
On May 10, 2007, shareholders of Google voted down an anti-censorship proposal for the company. The text of the failed proposal submitted by the New York City comptroller's office, which controls a significant number of shares on behalf of retirement funds, stated that:

1. Data that can identify individual users should not be hosted in Internet-restricting countries, where political speech can be treated as a crime by the legal system.
2. The company will not engage in proactive censorship.
3. The company will use all legal means to resist demands for censorship. The company will only comply with such demands if required to do so through legally binding procedures.
4. Users will be clearly informed when the company has acceded to legally binding government requests to filter or otherwise censor content that the user is trying to access.
5. Users should be informed about the company's data retention practices and the ways in which their data is shared with third parties.
6. The company will document all cases where legally-binding censorship requests have been complied with, and that information will be publicly available.

David Drummond, senior vice president for corporate development, said "Pulling out of China, shutting down Google.cn, is just not the right thing to do at this point... but that's exactly what this proposal would do."

CEO Eric Schmidt and founders Larry Page and Sergey Brin recommended that shareholders vote against the proposal. Together, they hold 66.2 percent of Google's total shareholder voting power, meaning that they could themselves have declined the anti-censorship proposal.

== Russian invasion of Ukraine ==
In early March 2022, contractors who were working for Google and preparing translations for the Russian market received an update from Google: "Effective immediately, the ongoing Russian war against Ukraine could no longer be referred to as a war but rather only vaguely as 'extraordinary circumstances.'" Thus, Google was trying to protect itself from Russian sanctions, as well as its employees from persecution within Russia, in connection with the new law, which provided up to 15 years in prison for any information about the war against Ukraine, except when officially announced by the Kremlin.

Since the beginning of the 2022 Russian invasion of Ukraine, Google has been blocking Russian state-funded media such as RT and Sputnik, and has also extended its censorship to non state-funded media outlets such as RBK by banning them entirely from the video-hosting platform YouTube. Thus said, Google has been blocking all Russian news outlets, citing that it represents a violation of their terms of services. Google also acted upon a request of the European Union.

Citing a report from The Guardian, YouTube footage of Ukrainian protesters burning a Russian flag and of people insulting Russian state symbols was taken down.

== See also ==
- Criticism of Google
- Content moderation
- Dragonfly (search engine)
- Internet censorship
- List of Google products § Discontinued products and services
- Network neutrality
- YouTube Premium § Licensing terms and content blocking

== Sources ==
- Galbraith, Patrick W. (2016). "'The lolicon guy': Some observations on researching unpopular topics in Japan". In McLelland, Mark (ed.). The End of Cool Japan: Ethical, Legal, and Cultural Challenges to Japanese Popular Culture. London and New York: Routledge. pp. 109–133. ISBN 978-1-317-26937-3. Archived from the original on 2021-07-25.
- Kittredge, Katharine (2014). "Lethal Girls Drawn for Boys: Girl Assassins in Manga/Anime and Comics/Film". Children's Literature Association Quarterly. 39 (4): 506–532 [524]. doi:10.1353/chq.2014.0059. S2CID 143630310.
- McLelland, Mark (2011b). "Australia's 'child-abuse material' legislation, internet regulation and the juridification of the imagination". International Journal of Cultural Studies. 15 (5): 467–483. doi:10.1177/1367877911421082. S2CID 41788106. Archived from the original on 2021-09-23.
