= Joel Szabat =

American government official and former military officer

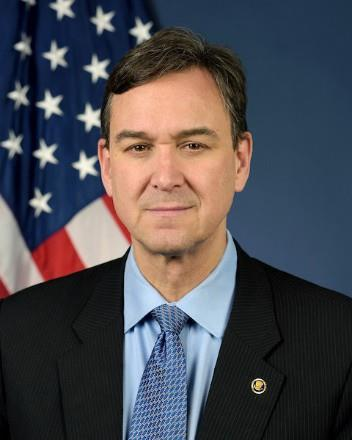

Member of the Amtrak Board of Directors
- Incumbent
- Assumed office January 23, 2024
- President: Joe Biden; Donald Trump
- Preceded by: Derek Kan

Acting Under Secretary of Transportation for Policy
- In office July 2019 – January 20, 2021
- President: Donald Trump
- Preceded by: Derek Kan
- Succeeded by: Carlos Monje

Assistant Secretary of Transportation for Aviation and International Affairs
- In office January 2, 2019 – January 20, 2021
- President: Donald Trump
- Preceded by: Susan Kurland
- Succeeded by: Annie Petsonk

Personal details
- Party: Republican
- Spouse: Chiling Tong
- Education: Georgetown University (BA); Harvard University (MBA)

Military service
- Allegiance: United States
- Branch/service: United States Army
- Rank: Captain
- Unit: 11th Armored Cavalry Regiment

Joel Szabat is a former American government official and military officer serving on the Amtrak Board of Directors since 2024. He previously served as Assistant Secretary of Transportation for Aviation and International Affairs.

== Department of Transportation ==
Szabat first joined the Department of Transportation in 2002. He served in several positions, including Deputy Assistant Secretary for Management and Budget, Deputy Assistant Secretary for Policy, Deputy Assistant Secretary for Aviation and International Affairs, and executive director of the United States Maritime Administration. In 2009, Szabat was the department's designated federal official for overseeing $48 billion of transportation infrastructure investments from the American Recovery and Reinvestment Act of 2009 that led to the construction of 15,000 transportation infrastructure projects.

In 2005, Szabat was assigned to the Embassy of the United States, Baghdad as the Transportation Counselor to the U.S. ambassador to Iraq; he also led U.S. government efforts to rebuild airports, ports and railroads in Iraq. In 2006–2007, Szabat was the Chief of Staff to Administrator Steve Preston of the Small Business Administration, before returning to the Department of Transportation.

In August 2018, Szabat was nominated by President Donald Trump to become Assistant Secretary of Transportation for Aviation and International Affairs. He was confirmed by the United States Senate in a unanimous voice vote on January 2, 2019. Szabat became Acting Under Secretary in June, 2019.

The Under Secretary is the third-highest position in the Department of Transportation, after the Secretary and Deputy Secretary. Szabat was one of the original members of the White House COVID-19 Task Force, representing the Department of Transportation. He announced efforts to limit airline passengers from infected parts of the globe from travelling to the United States, early in the pandemic, at a White House press conference in January, 2020. He and Dr. Anthony Fauci were the only two original COVID Task Force members to continue on into the Biden administration.

== Amtrak Board of Directors ==
In January, 2023, President Biden nominated Szabat to be a Director of the Amtrak Board of Directors. He was confirmed by the Senate on January 23, 2024.

== Other Ventures ==
Prior to first joining the Department of Transportation, Szabat worked as a Principal Consultant for transportation in the California State Assembly, as a management adviser in the United States Environmental Protection Agency, and for a private sector management consultancy. He was a cavalry officer in the U.S. Army, commanding soldiers patrolling the East-West German border during the Cold War. Szabat and his wife, Chiling Tong, founded the International Leadership Foundation, a non-profit corporation that promotes the civic awareness, involvement and effectiveness of Asian Americans and Pacific Islanders.

On January 1, 2023, Joel Szabat joined Strong Port Strategies (SPS) as the President of Aviation Strategies. In addition to aviation consulting and airport consulting, Joel also has a maritime, rail, and supply chain background. Strong Port Strategies provides port consulting services to help public entities, including port authorities, and private entities, such as marine terminal operators and airlines, navigate the grant application process, and advises companies that want to market their products or services to the transportation sector.
