= Shalanda Young =

American political advisor (born 1977)

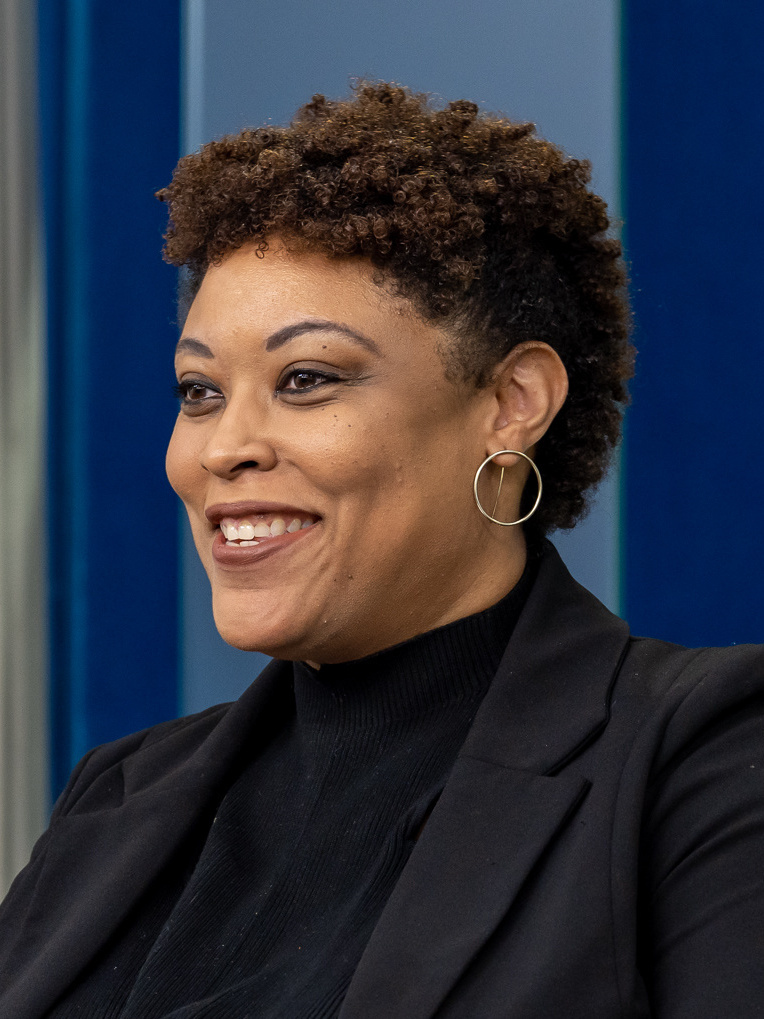
- Young in 2023

43rd Director of the Office of Management and Budget
- In office March 24, 2021 – January 20, 2025; Acting: March 24, 2021 – March 17, 2022
- President: Joe Biden
- Deputy: Nani A. Coloretti
- Preceded by: Russell Vought
- Succeeded by: Russell Vought

Deputy Director of the Office of Management and Budget
- In office March 24, 2021 – March 17, 2022
- President: Joe Biden
- Preceded by: Derek Kan
- Succeeded by: Nani A. Coloretti

Personal details
- Born: Shalanda Delores Young; August 29, 1977 (age 49) Zachary, Louisiana, U.S.
- Party: Democratic
- Children: 1
- Education: Loyola University New Orleans (BA); Tulane University (MHA)

Shalanda Delores Young (born August 29, 1977) is an American political advisor and government official who served as the 43rd director of the Office of Management and Budget from 2021 to 2025. A member of the Democratic Party, she previously worked as the staff director of the United States House Committee on Appropriations.

== Early life and education ==
Shalanda Delores Young was born in Zachary, Louisiana, and raised in Clinton, Louisiana. After graduating from Scotlandville Magnet High School, she earned a Bachelor of Arts degree in Psychology from Loyola University New Orleans and a Master of Health Administration from Tulane University.

== Career ==
Young moved to Washington, D.C., around 2001, where she became a Presidential Management Fellow with the National Institutes of Health.

For 14 years, Young worked as a staffer for the United States House Committee on Appropriations. In February 2017, she was named staff director of the committee, a position in which she served until her nomination for deputy director of OMB in 2021. As staff director on the committee, Young was involved with creating proposals related to the 2018–2019 United States federal government shutdown and the federal government response to the COVID-19 pandemic.

=== Office of Management and Budget ===
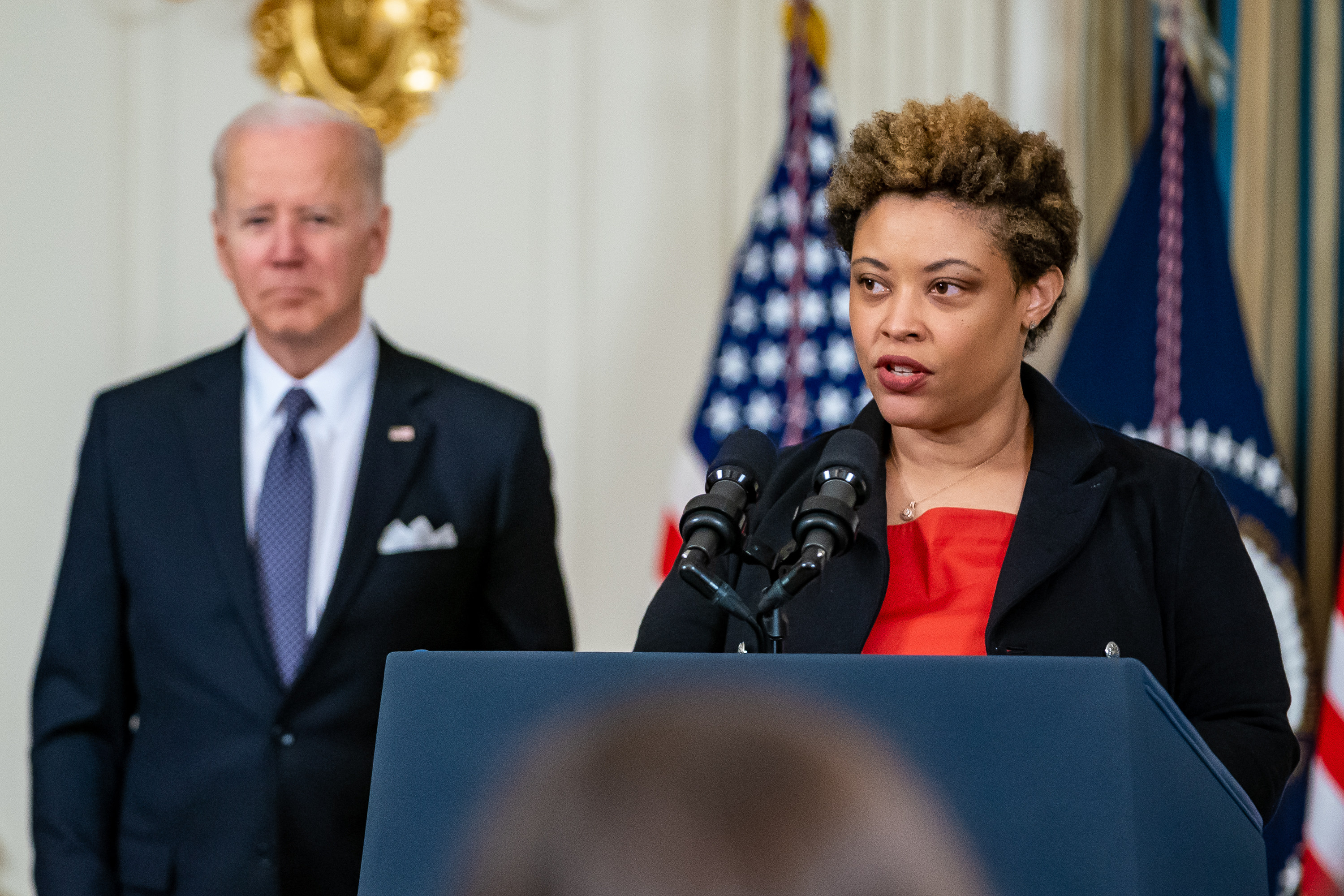
Young with President Joe Biden in the State Dining Room of the White House on March 28, 2022

During a hearing concerning her nomination for deputy director of the OMB, she received some praise from Republican members of the Senate Budget Committee, including Lindsey Graham, who said "Everybody who deals with you on our side has nothing but good things to say." The approval of her nomination as deputy director by the Senate Homeland Security and Governmental Affairs Committee was less bipartisan, with a vote along party lines to advance it, with GOP Senators voicing concerns over her support of removing the Hyde Amendment from the federal budget.

As she was confirmed as deputy director of the OMB, she then became the acting director until she was officially confirmed.

As the nomination of Neera Tanden for OMB director faced opposition, Democrats in the Congressional Black Caucus began to consider Young for the position of OMB director, should Tanden's nomination fail. After Tanden's nomination for OMB director was withdrawn, the CBC and New Democrat Coalition later endorsed Young outright. House Speaker Nancy Pelosi, Majority Leader Steny Hoyer, and Majority Whip Jim Clyburn released a joint statement concerning Young, saying:

As longtime Members of the Appropriations Committee, we take great pride in recommending Shalanda Young as Director of the Office of Management and Budget. ... Her leadership at the OMB would be historic and would send a strong message that this Administration is eager to work in close coordination with Members of Congress to craft budgets that meet the challenges of our time and can secure broad, bipartisan support.

Young also received an endorsement for OMB director from Rosa DeLauro, who is the chairwoman of the House Committee on Appropriations. Young received support from various Senate Republicans other than Lindsey Graham, including Senate Appropriations Committee ranking member Richard Shelby from Alabama.

Young was confirmed by the United States Senate by a vote of 63–37 to be OMB deputy, on March 23, 2021.

On November 24, Biden announced he would nominate Young as OMB director, after eight months serving as acting director. The Senate confirmed Young in a 61–36 vote on March 15, 2022.

Young, along with Steve Ricchetti and Louisa Terrell, was tapped to lead the Democratic side in negotiations over the 2023 United States debt-ceiling crisis. Representative Garret Graves, a key Kevin McCarthy ally and point person on debt and budget issues, was tapped to lead the Republican side. With a reputation for being known and trusted by members of both parties, Young's input was described as "indispensable" in reaching a proposed agreement.

== See also ==
- List of African-American United States Cabinet members
- List of female United States Cabinet members

Political offices
| Preceded by Derek Kan | Deputy Director of the Office of Management and Budget; 2021–2022 | Succeeded by Nani Coloretti |
| Preceded by Rob Fairweather; Acting | Director of the Office of Management and Budget; 2021–2025; Acting: 2021–2022 | Succeeded by Matthew Vaeth; Acting |
