= Annie Petsonk =

American attorney

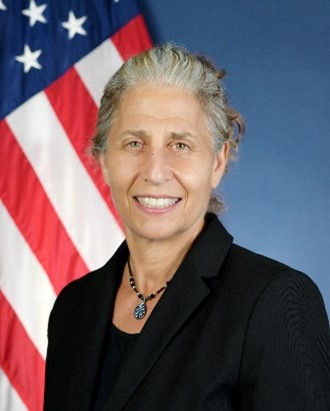

Assistant Secretary of Transportation for Aviation and International Affairs
- Incumbent
- In office June 24, 2022 – January 20, 2025
- President: Joe Biden
- Preceded by: Joel Szabat
- Succeeded by: Daniel J. Edwards

Personal details
- Born: Carol Annette Petsonk
- Spouse: John Watts
- Children: 1
- Education: Colorado College (BA); Harvard University (JD)

Carol Annette "Annie" Petsonk is an American attorney who had served the Assistant Secretary of Transportation for Aviation and International Affairs in the Biden administration. Petsonk was confirmed by the U.S. Senate in a voice vote on May 18, 2022.

== Education ==
Pentsonk began her undergraduate education at Harvard University before transferring to Colorado College, where she earned a Bachelor of Arts degree in 1979. She then earned a Juris Doctor from Harvard Law School.

== Career ==
After graduating from law school, Pentsonk worked in the United States Department of Justice and Office of the United States Trade Representative, where she worked on issues related to trade and environmental policy. She has also worked at the United Nations Environment Programme and as a law professor at the George Washington University Law School. Prior to the start of the Biden administration, was the international counsel for the Environmental Defense Fund.
