= Russell Vought =

American political advisor (born 1976)

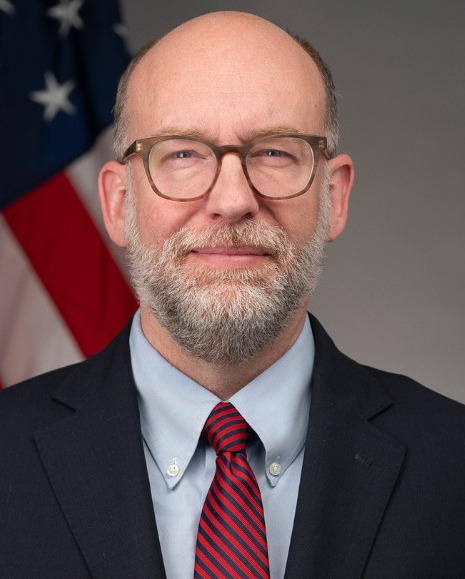
- Official portrait, 2025

42nd and 44th Director of the Office of Management and Budget
- Incumbent
- Assumed office February 7, 2025
- President: Donald Trump
- Deputy: Dan Bishop; Hal Duncan
- Preceded by: Shalanda Young
- In office January 2, 2019 (Note: Acting: January 2, 2019 – July 22, 2020) – January 20, 2021
- President: Donald Trump
- Deputy: Himself; Derek Kan
- Preceded by: Mick Mulvaney
- Succeeded by: Shalanda Young
Other administration positions 2025‍–‍present
Acting Administrator of the United States Agency for International Development
In office August 29, 2025 – November 24, 2025
President	Donald Trump
Preceded by	Marco Rubio (acting)
Succeeded by	Eric Ueland (acting)
Acting Director of the Consumer Financial Protection Bureau
In office February 7, 2025 – August 1, 2026
President	Donald Trump
Deputy	Zixta Martinez
Preceded by	Scott Bessent (acting)
Succeeded by	Mark Paoletta (acting)

Deputy Director of the Office of Management and Budget
- In office March 14, 2018 – July 22, 2020
- President: Donald Trump
- Preceded by: Brian Deese
- Succeeded by: Derek Kan

Personal details
- Born: Russell Thurlow Vought; March 26, 1976 (age 50) New York, U.S.
- Party: Republican
- Spouses: Mary MacLean (div. 2023); Michelle Martin (m. 2025)
- Children: 2
- Education: Wheaton College (BA); George Washington University (JD)

Russell Thurlow Vought (/voʊt/ VOHT; born March 26, 1976) is an American political advisor who has served as the director of the Office of Management and Budget since February 2025 and is a primary architect of the Heritage Foundation's Project 2025 blueprint. Vought has additionally served as the acting director of the Consumer Financial Protection Bureau from February 2025 to August 2026 and as the acting administrator of the United States Agency for International Development from August to November 2025. He served as the Office of Management and Budget's director from 2020 to 2021 and as its deputy director, as well as its acting director, from 2018 to 2020.

Vought graduated from Wheaton College with a degree in history and political science and later from the George Washington University Law School with a Juris Doctor in 2004. While attending Wheaton, he interned for several lawmakers, including Texas senator Phil Gramm, whose views on deficits influenced Vought. After graduating from George Washington University, Vought worked for the Republican Study Committee. In December 2008, Indiana representative Mike Pence, the chairman of the House Republican Conference, named Vought as the conference's policy director. Vought clashed with Republican leadership in the House of Representatives over government spending. He resigned following the passage of the Affordable Care Act in March 2010 to establish Heritage Action for America, an advocacy organization, with Michael Needham.

Following Donald Trump's victory in the 2016 presidential election, Vought was offered a position as a senior advisor in the Office of Management and Budget. In April 2017, President Trump announced Vought as his nominee for deputy director of the Office of Management and Budget. Vought was confirmed by the U.S. Senate on February 28, 2018. Vought and Mick Mulvaney, the director of the Office of Management and Budget, sought to significantly reduce government expenditures on social programs and international aid.

Vought's first tenure as the director of the Office of Management and Budget occurred amid the 2018–2019 federal government shutdown. He sought substantive federal government spending reductions. Vought's decision to reduce U.S. spending on Ukraine faced scrutiny. In March 2020, following Mulvaney's departure as director of the Office of Management and Budget, Vought succeeded Mulvaney as director of the office.

Vought founded the Center for Renewing America, a conservative think tank, in 2021. He was influential in the Republican Party's strategy on the 2023 federal budget and the debt-ceiling crisis that year. Vought was a vocal opponent of California representative Kevin McCarthy's tenure as speaker of the House of Representatives and sought his removal; in October 2023, a motion to vacate the chair passed, resulting in McCarthy's removal. Concurrently, Vought was involved in an effort to re-enact Schedule F appointments and fire many of the workers in the federal civil service. He led the federal government study project of Project 2025, a non-profit initiative to institute conservative policies within the federal government, and was a key figure in report.

On November 22, 2024, President-elect Donald Trump announced his nomination of Vought to serve as the director of the Office of Management and Budget. The U.S. Senate voted to confirm Vought on February 6, 2025. Vought was subsequently named as the director of the Consumer Financial Protection Bureau.

== Early life and education (1976–2004) ==
Russell Thurlow Vought was born on March 26, 1976, in New York. He was raised in New York and Trumbull, Connecticut. Vought was the only child born to Thurlow Bunyea Vought and Margaret Flowers Vought (née Smith), and was the youngest in a blended family of seven children. Thurlow was a former United States Marine who worked as a union electrician, while Margaret was a public school teacher who later co-founded a Christian elementary school. Though Trumbull was a wealthy town, the Voughts were of modest means. He later described being brought into Christian faith at four years old, when one of his stepsisters died, by his mother; in a podcast interview, Vought stated that he was a member of a "really strong Bible-preaching, Bible-teaching church". Vought was sent to Christian summer camps and attended a private Christian school.

Vought attended Wheaton College, where he majored in history and political science. A Wheaton student later described him as "bookish" and slightly "nerdy" to The Atlantic. In 1997, Vought unsuccessfully ran for student body vice president, campaigning on promises of improving recycling and reforming Wheaton's conservative social codes. The following year, he interned for Connecticut representative Chris Shays, later interning for Indiana senator Dan Coats. In 1999, Vought began working for Texas senator Phil Gramm, handling letters from Gramm's constituents. Gramm's political beliefs, particularly on deficits, influenced Vought. By 2001, Vought had started working at a B. Dalton bookstore, later taking night classes at the George Washington University Law School. That year, Gramm offered Vought a promotion as legislative assistant; Vought told him that he was willing to drop out. Vought graduated from George Washington University in 2004 with a Juris Doctor.

== Career ==
=== Policy work (2004–2017) ===
After graduating from George Washington University, Vought worked for Texas representative Jeb Hensarling, an associate of Gramm. He assisted in drafting the Family Budget Protection Act, a proposal that would cut US$1.8 trillion in entitlement programs. By the following year, Vought had begun working for the Republican Study Committee. He helped develop Operation Offset, a deficit reduction plan for Hurricane Katrina disaster relief. In December 2008, Indiana representative Mike Pence, the chairman of the House Republican Conference, named Vought as the conference's policy director. In his direct work with congressional Republicans, Vought opposed bills that added to the deficit and lawmakers who voted for bills that increased spending despite claiming to be deficit-conscious.

Following the passage of the Affordable Care Act in March 2010, Michael Needham and Vought established Heritage Action for America. He resigned as the policy director for the House Republican Conference in July to serve as the political director of Heritage Action in July. The concurrent Tea Party movement provided Vought an opportunity to direct budget policy for Republicans. He publicly disagreed with Republican congressional leaders over subsidies for agriculture and regulations on greenhouse gas emissions. In one such act of defiance, Vought suggested that Heritage Action send out mailers associating Tennessee senator Bob Corker with U.S. president Barack Obama, Russian president Vladimir Putin, and Iranian president Mahmoud Ahmadinejad, over Corker's vote to support New START, a nuclear disarmament treaty between the United States and Russia, according to ProPublica. In 2013, Vought led an effort to encourage Republicans to defund the Affordable Care Act, a protest that led to a federal government shutdown.

=== Deputy director of the Office of Management and Budget (2018–2020) ===
After Donald Trump's victory in the 2016 presidential election, Vought was offered a position as a senior advisor in the Office of Management and Budget; according to The Washington Post, he was brought into the Trump administration by vice president Mike Pence and Mick Mulvaney, Trump's nominee for director of the Office of Management and Budget. Vought—who is a deacon of the Baptist church—considered assisting in the presidential transition, then attend seminary and becoming a pastor. In a podcast interview, Vought stated that "God had other plans". In March 2017, Trump signed an executive order seeking to reorganize the federal government. The order was executed by Vought, who led a plan to convince Trump to cut funding for the United States Agency for International Development and Consumer Financial Protection Bureau, as well as combine the Department of Health and Human Services and food stamps programs into a singular organization. Several of Vought's proposed initiatives were opposed by members of Trump's cabinet and the general counsels of multiple agencies; many of the recommendations in Vought's plan, released the following year, were not implemented. According to the Post, Vought originated the Office of Management and Budget's request of US$1.6 billion for Trump's wall along the Mexico–United States border.

In April 2017, Trump named Vought as his nominee for deputy director of the Office of Management and Budget. Texas senator John Cornyn held up Vought's nomination over additional funding to his state in the aftermath of Hurricane Harvey, and his hearing faced delays over comments he wrote a year prior arguing that Muslims have a "deficient theology" and "stand condemned" for rejecting Jesus. Vought was confirmed on February 28, 2018 in a 50–49 vote along party lines; vice president Mike Pence cast a tie-breaking vote after Arizona senator John McCain and South Dakota senator Mike Rounds were absent. At the Office of Management and Budget, Vought and Mulvaney worked to attempt to cut funding for Meals on Wheels, a food delivery service for disabled individuals, leading to conflicts with staff. Vought additionally coordinated with the lawyer Mark Paoletta, who was confirmed as the Office of Management and Budget's general counsel in 2018. That year, Trump—at Vought's behest—sent Congress a US$15 billion rescission that would cut funding for the Children's Health Insurance Program, the Advanced Technology Vehicles Manufacturing Loan Program, and the United States Agency for International Development's Ebola response; the measure failed in the Senate by one vote.

== Director of the Office of Management and Budget (2018–2021) ==
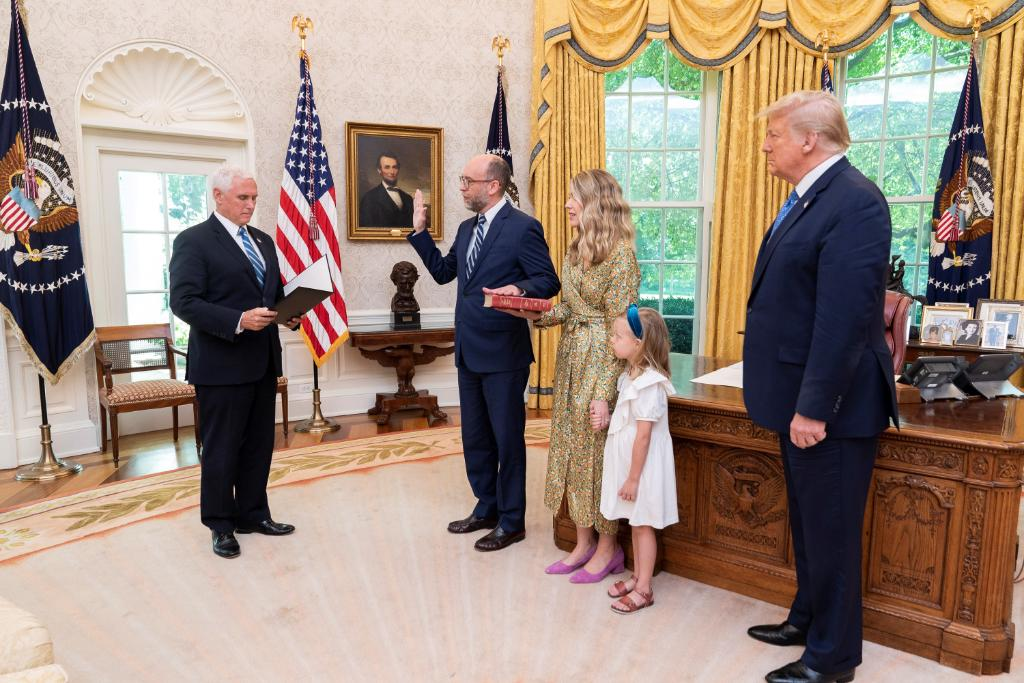
Vice president Mike Pence swears in Vought as the director of the Office of Management and Budget in July 2020.

In December 2018, as Congress refused to fund Donald Trump's wall, Vought and Mark Paoletta devised a strategy to declare a national emergency at the border, giving Trump greater authority to seize funds from elsewhere. After Paoletta and Mick Mulvaney alleged that Trump's chief of staff, John F. Kelly, was refusing to tell Trump he could declare an emergency, Trump removed Kelly and named Mick Mulvaney as his acting chief of staff. Mulvaney remained in his position but delegated many of his responsibilities to Vought, who became the acting director before January 2019. Vought's tenure began during the 2018–2019 federal government shutdown. He led an effort to recall Internal Revenue Service employees and vowed to ease the shutdown while stating that Democrats should negotiate. His attempts at lessening the impact of the shutdown included allowing the Internal Revenue Service to pay tax refunds and to find money to pay recipients of the Supplemental Nutrition Assistance Program. Vought banned official congressional travel that was not authorized by the White House Chief of Staff for the duration of the shutdown. In a memorandum written in April, he moved to exert greater authority over the federal regulatory process by broadening the scope of regulations implemented by independent government agencies that are subject to the Congressional Review Act. In June, Vought called for a two-year delay on the federal government's ban on the Chinese technology company, Huawei.

Vought's directorship was marked by "brinkmanship on the debt ceiling" and austere spending limits, according to The New York Times, and he engaged in efforts to convince Trump to follow austerity. The Office of Management and Budget's budgets called for the largest cuts in modern U.S. history, according to ProPublica. Vought advocated for a proposal, later rejected by Trump, that would have cut US$4 billion in foreign aid funding from the Department of State and the United States Agency for International Development. In the impeachment inquiry into Trump, congressional investigators requested that Vought appear before House committees investigating the president to discuss the Office of Management and Budget's decision to cut security aid to Ukraine. Vought rebuffed the request, arguing that the inquiry—citing a letter written by Pat Cipollone, the White House counsel—was unconstitutional, and the office refused to provide records to investigators; a federal judge later ruled that the investigation was legal. The Trump administration ordered Vought not to testify, and Democrats later indicated that they would not force officials to comply with subpoenas with lawsuits. Vought appeared before the House Committee on the Budget in February 2020.

In March 2020, Trump ousted Mulvaney as his chief of staff and the director of the Office of Management and Budget; Vought, who was named as Mulvaney's successor, had lobbied for the position for months, according to The New York Times. Vought appeared before the Senate Committee on Homeland Security and Governmental Affairs on June 3, for his confirmation hearing to lead the agency; several senators pressed Vought on his agency's failure to fulfill multiple oversight requests from the Government Accountability Office relating to the COVID-19 pandemic. The committee voted to advance his nomination along party lines in a 7-4 vote on June 10, and he was confirmed by the Senate on July 20. Amid the COVID-19 pandemic, Vought requested emergency funding from Congress for monitoring. Kyle McGowan, a former chief of staff at the Centers for Disease Control and Prevention, recalled to the Times that he and Robert R. Redfield, the agency's director, had argued with Vought over social distancing guidelines for restaurants, where Vought described restrictions as not feasible. Amid the George Floyd protests, Trump directed Vought to cut federal funding from Democratic-led cities. Days later, Vought issued a memorandum canceling contracts for sensitivity training. Near the conclusion of Trump's term, Vought sought to reclassify hundreds of Office of Management and Budget workers through Schedule F appointments, making them at-will employees, though he was unsuccessful by the time of the inauguration of Joe Biden. Vought faced allegations from staff involved in Biden's presidential transition that he was intentionally stifling the transition, an allegation he rejected.

== Between directorships (2021–2025) ==
In December 2020, Trump named Vought to the United States Naval Academy's board of visitors. The Biden administration requested that he resign in September 2021; Vought declined, arguing that he had been appointed to a three-year term on Twitter. A week after the inauguration of Joe Biden, Vought established the Center for Renewing America, a policy research organization, and Citizens for Renewing America, an advocacy organization. By May, the Center for Renewing America had eight paid staffers, including Vought, and by the following month, Vought had become affiliated with America First Legal. He oriented the Center for Renewing America's efforts towards countering critical race theory in schools, attempting to advance state legislation and working with North Carolina representative Dan Bishop to codify Trump's executive order barring federal contractors from conducting racial sensitivity trainings. Policies proposed by the Center for Renewing America included invoking the Insurrection Act to deploy military forces within the United States, freezing billions in federal funding without congressional approval, and mass firing federal workers without the consultation of unions. In preparation for Trump's potential second term, Vought led an effort to pursue Christian nationalist policies. He served as the treasurer of America First Legal, a public interest organization founded by Stephen Miller.

Vought was influential in the Republican budget proposal for the 2023 federal budget. His proposal called for a US$22 billion cut to the Department of Health and Human Services and a US$26 billion cut to the Department of Housing and Urban Development, including gradual reductions in Section 8 grants. Vought sought to cut entitlement programs, though he was forced to abandon the debate in favor of attainable goals, as well as spending in favor of the "bureaucracies arrayed against the public". During the 2023 debt-ceiling crisis, Vought advised Republicans on their strategy towards the debt ceiling. The Washington Post described Vought as "one of the central voices" in debt-ceiling discussions. He sought the establishment of the House Judiciary Select Subcommittee on the Weaponization of the Federal Government, led by Ohio representative Jim Jordan. A loose association of advisors, following Vought's doctrine, argued that the risk of a debt default was worth seeking trillions in cuts. Vought was a critic of a deal between president Joe Biden and Kevin McCarthy, the speaker of the House, to end the crisis.

After the 2022 House of Representatives elections, Vought criticized California representative Kevin McCarthy for initiating an early campaign for speaker of the House, believing it to be "presumptuous" and anticipating that several Republicans would deny him the position in the January 2023 election. Members of the Freedom Caucus, including Texas representative Chip Roy and Florida representative Matt Gaetz, concurred with Vought in seeking new leadership. In an interview with Steve Bannon, Vought said an opportunity existed to elect Jordan as speaker or to have a "coalitional-style government" in which decisions are routed to the Freedom Caucus. McCarthy's deal to end the debt-ceiling crisis set into motion a conflict between the Freedom Caucus and McCarthy, resulting in McCarthy's removal as speaker of the House. According to The New York Times, Vought encouraged Freedom Caucus members to remove McCarthy. In the resulting election, he opposed a "pledge" by Republicans to guarantee a speaker.

Concurrently, Vought was involved in an effort to re-enact Schedule F appointments and fire many of the workers in the federal civil service. He was additionally involved in the political appointments of lawyers, in the event of Trump's victory in the 2024 presidential election, as early as November 2023. According to Politico, Vought had spoken at least once a month with Trump by February 2024. In May, Trump and the Republican National Committee named Vought as the policy director of the committee's 2024 platform. He participated in Trump's second presidential transition after his victory in the 2024 presidential election, devising his economic and trade policies alongside Vince Haley and Robert Lighthizer. Vought has been described as an "architect" of Project 2025. (Note: Attributed to multiple references:) He authored a section of Project 2025's Mandate for Leadership on the Executive Office of the President. Vought additionally drafted a "transition playbook" for Project 2025 to be implemented by Trump within six months.

== Director of the Office of Management and Budget (2025–present) ==
=== Nomination and confirmation ===
As early as February 2024, Vought was widely believed to be a potential White House chief of staff in Donald Trump's prospective second term. In June, The Washington Post reported that Vought was formally being considered as a potential White House chief of staff, a report that was later corroborated by The New York Times Magazine in October. After Trump's victory the following month, ABC News reported that Vought had been discussed as a possible nominee for director of the Office of Management and Budget or an economic-focused policy role. According to The New York Times, Vought gave Elon Musk an overview of the workings of the federal government, and Musk advocated for Vought to serve as the director of the Office of Management and Budget.

On November 22, Trump announced that Vought would be his nominee for director of the Office of Management and Budget. Vought appeared before the Senate Committee on Homeland Security and Governmental Affairs on January 15, five days before Trump's inauguration. The committee voted to advance Vought's nomination hours after Trump's inauguration. On January 30, Senate Committee on Banking, Housing, and Urban Affairs, which had equal jurisdiction over Vought's nomination, voted to advance the nomination 11–0 along party lines after Democrats refused to attend the meeting; concurrently, they held a press conference to criticize Vought as "dangerously unfit". On February 5, Democrats in the broader Senate, after a procedural vote to advance Vought's nomination passed, attempted to stall the final vote by staying awake through the night. The following morning, Vought was confirmed in a 53–47 vote along party lines. A post from Wheaton College congratulating Vought, a Wheaton alumnus, led to a controversy at the college.

=== Tenure ===
After his confirmation in February 2025, Vought supported an executive order Trump signed instituting "large scale" cuts to the United States federal civil service. An order signed later by Trump gave Vought the ostensible authority to withhold funding from initiatives conflicting with Trump's broader agenda. That month, Vought and Charles Ezell, the acting director of the Office of Personnel Management, issued a memorandum requiring agencies begin "large-scale reductions in force", modify their organizational charts, and propose moving their offices out of Washington, D.C.

Vought's tenure occurred as the Department of Government Efficiency, a government initiative intended to cut spending, mounted across the federal government. Vought told the Senate Committee on Homeland Security and Governmental Affairs in his confirmation hearing that the Department of Government Efficiency would advise the Office of Management and Budget. After the executive order establishing the United States DOGE Service was signed, Vought privately asked allies how the initiative would operate. Prior to Musk's exit—and the Trump–Musk feud—a Trump administration official told Bloomberg News that he was "waiting in the wings".

According to Stephen Miller, the White House deputy chief of staff for policy, Vought conceived the memorandum instituting a pause on federal grants. The memorandum was drafted by officials in the Office of Management and Budget and released without the advisement of advisers in the White House Office, including Will Scharf, the staff secretary, according to The Wall Street Journal. The Office of Management and Budget later clarified the extent of the pause after Vought was questioned on its scope.

=== Acting positions ===
On February 7, 2025, one day after he was confirmed as director of the Office of Management and Budget, Vought was named as the acting director of the Consumer Financial Protection Bureau. The following day, he ordered the bureau's employees to cease "all supervision and examination activity" and "all stakeholder engagement"; a day later, he closed its headquarters for the coming week. The National Treasury Employees Union later sued Vought in two lawsuits, alleging that he violated the Privacy Act in granting the Department of Government Efficiency access to worker information, and that he infringed on the congressional mandate to establish the bureau. The ambiguous legality and verbiage of Vought's stop-work order led to confusion among employees.

The Consumer Financial Protection Bureau faced mass firings, refused to pursue enforcement cases, and sought to repay mortgage lenders. Vought attempted to fire over ninety percent of the bureau's staff, a plan that was paused by federal judges. In November 2025, he posed a legal argument that the Consumer Financial Protection Bureau's funding—which originates from the Federal Reserve—is illegal. That month, Trump nominated a permanent director, Stuart Levenbach, in an effort to ensure Vought could remain as acting director for longer. Though he halted the agency's operations, the bureau instituted a "humility pledge" to seek less vigorous enforcement and to work with companies facing investigations. The following month, a federal judge compelled Vought to seek funding from the Federal Reserve.

On August 29, 2025, Vought succeeded Marco Rubio, the secretary of state, as the acting administrator of the United States Agency for International Development, an agency that faced efforts to be forcefully closed in Trump's second term. He was succeeded by Eric Ueland, Vought's deputy director for management, on November 25.

== Policy Positions ==
=== Domestic issues and religious views ===
Vought has referred to himself as a defender of an "older definition of conservatism", specifically the New Right. In September 2019, Vought supported a plan to revoke California's legal authority to set tailpipe pollution regulations stricter than the federal government's rules. He praised Donald Trump for being the first president to attend a March for Life rally held in January 2020, referring to it as a "golden chapter for our movement"; Vought later called for drugs used in medical abortions to be banned. Vought has referred to transgender identity as a "contagion". In the Mandate for Leadership for Project 2025, Vought criticized the environmental policy of the Biden administration as "climate fanaticism". In his Project 2025 chapter, he called for a special assistant to the president to implement policies focused on "life and family". Vought is supportive of a work requirement for Medicaid.

Vought has argued in favor of immigration restrictionism, believing that migrants should "accept Israel's God, laws, and understanding of history". In Trump's first term, he defended its family separation policy. A joint statement by Vought and Ken Cuccinelli, the former acting deputy secretary of homeland security, criticized Texas governor Greg Abbott for implementing a catch and release immigration policy without formally declaring an invasion that would purportedly allow Abbott to deport migrants and utilize military resources. In a hidden-camera video, Vought described the George Floyd protests as about "destabilizing the Trump administration" and justified Trump's deployment of federal forces. His proposals at the Center for Renewing America included using military force against protesters if deemed necessary and defunding agencies such as the Environmental Protection Agency.

Vought is a self-described Christian nationalist. In 2021, he wrote in Newsweek that the United States should be recognized as a Christian nation in which its "rights and duties are understood to come from God". He has praised his association with the Christian nationalist William E. Wolfe and repeated several of his views, including an article in The Daily Caller stating that "Jesus Christ wasn't an open-borders socialist". According to Mother Jones, Vought was influenced by the works of the German theologian Dietrich Bonhoeffer in his senior year of high school, particularly deriving a sense of engaging in the world to serve God.

In a written questionnaire for his second nomination to serve as the director of the Office of Management and Budget, Vought stated that he believed the 2020 presidential election was "rigged", owing to false claims of fraud. After the FBI search of Mar-a-Lago, Vought criticized the "weaponization" of the Federal Bureau of Investigation. After Trump was found guilty in a criminal trial in New York, Vought posted on X that the Constitution had lost its effect. In an interview with the conservative activist Charlie Kirk, Vought supported prosecuting individuals who investigated Trump and his allies.

=== Fiscal measures and government structures ===
Vought is a fiscal conservative. In congressional hearings, Vought stated that he supported attaching spending cuts to increases to the debt ceiling. Vought opposed the Republican-supported highway funding bill proposed in 2012 for adding to the national debt. In April 2021, he sought a ban on earmarks. In January 2025, Vought told the Senate Committee on the Budget that he believed the Congressional Budget and Impoundment Control Act was unconstitutional. Vought has associated his notions of increasing the scope of government with the broad culture war.

In 2023, Vought stated that he sought to shut down agencies and leave federal workers "traumatically affected". That year, he told The New York Times that he was critical of the independence of several agencies, including of the Federal Reserve—itself an instance of central bank independence—and the Department of Justice. In a privately meeting secretly recorded in July 2024, Vought stated that he spent much of his time "working on the plans of what's necessary to take control of these bureaucracies", including developing arguments against agency independence. Speaking to Steve Bannon on his podcast, War Room (2019–present), Vought defended his ideology as "radical constitutionalism", a concept that includes the unitary executive theory. He has defended radicalism as a necessary response to apparent efforts by progressives to install bureaucrats, going against the intentions of the Founding Fathers.

=== Political institutions ===
On his blog—which was occasionally shared on the broader conservative website RedState—Vought criticized Republicans in the presidency of Barack Obama for not seeking larger spending cuts. In a private Google Group with Republican operatives known as "The Repeal Coalition", he sharply criticized speaker of the House John Boehner over an internal plan to address the Affordable Care Act that would replicate sections of the act, estimating that it would be ruled unconstitutional by the Supreme Court. Vought frequently derided Republicans for failing to block Barack Obama's policy initiatives. In 2011, he argued that Republicans in the House of Representatives should push the party "as far to the right as is possible and flat out oppose it when necessary".

=== Foreign policy ===
Vought is an opponent of foreign interventions by the United States. After the Russo-Ukrainian war began in February 2022, he criticized neoconservatives and advocated for returning soldiers from Europe. Vought lobbied against NATO ascensions of Finland and Sweden, countries that later entered the alliance. After Trump stated that he would allow Russia to attack NATO countries that had not met financial commitments, Vought told the Financial Times that NATO's collective defense should be "reassessed".

== Personal life ==
Vought met his first wife, Mary MacLean, in Washington, D.C., where they both eventually worked for Mike Pence. Russell and Mary had two daughters, one of whom was diagnosed with cystic fibrosis, before they divorced in 2023. He married Michelle Martin, a director for Citizens for Renewing America, in November 2025.

In August 2025, a 26-year-old Maryland man, Colin Demarco, allegedly traveled to Vought's Arlington, Virginia, home while carrying a backpack and wearing a mask, gloves, and sunglasses. Court documents state he was captured on a Ring doorbell camera at the front door, looked through the mailbox, and approached a neighbor asking about Vought while appearing to carry a gun. Investigators later recovered notes referencing plans to kill "R.V.", weapons, and a "body disposal guide." Demarco was arrested in January 2026 and charged with attempted murder, firearms offenses, and unlawful mask-wearing.

== Written works ==
- Vought, Russell (2016), Wheaton College and the Preservation of Theological Clarity, The Resurgent
- Vought, Russell (2021), How To Lead The United States Into An American Spring, The Federalist
- Vought, Russell (2021), HR 1 will open up voting access alright — especially for those voting fraudulently, The Arizona Republic
- Vought, Russell (2021), Is There Anything Actually Wrong With ‘Christian Nationalism?’, Newsweek
- Vought, Russell (2022), Renewing American Purpose, The American Mind
- Vought, Russell, (2022), Project 2025: Mandate for Leadership, The Heritage Foundation, pp. 43-69
- Vought, Russell, (2023), A Commitment to End Woke and Weaponized Government - 2023 Budget Proposal, Center for Renewing America

== See also ==
- List of contributors to Project 2025

== Works cited ==
- Karni, Annie; Broadwater, Luke (2025). Mad House: How Donald Trump, MAGA Mean Girls, a Former Used Car Salesman, a Florida Nepo Baby, and a Man with Rats in His Walls Broke Congress. New York City: Random House. ISBN 978-0-593-73126-0.

Political offices
Preceded by Brian Deese	Deputy Director of the Office of Management and Budget; 2018–2020	Succeeded by Derek Kan
Preceded by Mick Mulvaney	Director of the Office of Management and Budget; 2019–2021; Acting: 2019–2020	Succeeded by Rob Fairweather; Acting
Preceded by Matthew Vaeth; Acting	Director of the Office of Management and Budget; 2025–present	Incumbent
Preceded by Marco Rubio; Acting	Administrator of the United States Agency for International Development; Acting; 2025–present	Incumbent
Government offices
Preceded by Scott Bessent; Acting	Director of the Consumer Financial Protection Bureau; Acting; 2025–present	Succeeded by Jonathan McKernan; Nominee
Order of precedence
Preceded by Lee Zeldin as Administrator of the Environmental Protection Agency	Order of precedence of the United States as Director of the Office of Management and Budget	Succeeded by Jamieson Greer as U.S. Trade Representative
