= Chiling Tong =

American politician

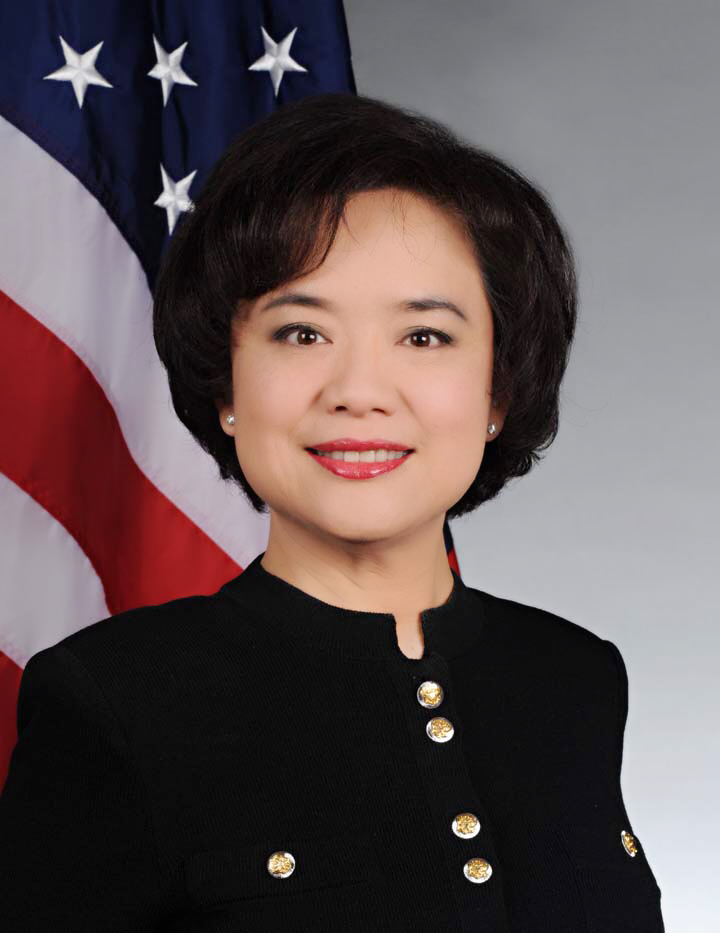
Chiling Tong

Chiling Tong (Chinese: 董繼玲; pinyin: Dǒngjìlíng) is an American nonprofit executive and former government official whose career has focused on economic development, minority-owned businesses, and community leadership. She has served in federal government positions and on presidential advisory commissions. She is currently the president and chief executive officer of The National Asian Pacific Islander American Chamber of Commerce & Entrepreneurship (National ACE) and the Founding President of the International Leadership Foundation.

== Family and Education ==
Tong's father was a lieutenant general in the Republic of China Army. He served as the director of Taiwan Railways Administration (TRA), and is known as the "founding father of underground railroad in Taiwan." Tong's great-granduncle, Hollington Tong, was the ambassador of the Republic of China to the United States from 1956 to 1958, and wrote a biography of Chiang Kai-shek as one of the members within his inner circle. Her cousin Kaity Tong is a broadcast journalist and has been a television news anchor in New York City since 1981. Tong's husband is Joel Szabat, a government official at the United States Department of Transportation and co-founder of the International Leadership Foundation.

Tong graduated with a BA in English from Taiwan's Chinese Culture University, then she went to the United States in 1984 and received her MBA degree from California State University, Long Beach. She was a fellow at Coro from 1988 to 1989 and a Rajawali research fellow at Harvard's Ash Center for Democratic Governance and Innovation from 2011 to 2012.

== Career ==
Tong's career in government and public service began in California in 1991, when she joined Pete Wilson's gubernatorial campaign. After he became the governor of California, Tong was appointed assistant-secretary for international trade in the California Trade and Commerce Agency and director of the California Office of Trade and Investment in Taiwan.

In 2000, Tong and her husband co-founded the International Leadership Foundation (ILF), a non-profit organization promoting civic awareness for Asian Pacific American college students and the community. She established the civic fellowship program, a civic leadership development program for Asian Americans and Pacific Islanders. The program provided scholarship and leadership training for more than 10,000 students over 20 years with a nationwide network of twenty chapters.

In the George W. Bush administration, Tong served as deputy assistant secretary of the International Trade Administration in the Department of Commerce. She was responsible for improving access for US companies to Asia-Pacific markets. She also held positions at the Minority Business Development Agency.

In the Obama administration, Tong was appointed as a member of the National Advisory Council on Minority Business Enterprises under the Minority Business Development Agency. She also served on the President's Advisory Commission on Asian Americans and Pacific Islanders, operated by the White House Initiative on Asian Americans and Pacific Islanders during the George W. Bush and Donald Trump administrations.

In 2015, Tong was appointed by majority leader Mitch McConnell to be director of the Congressional Award for young leaders. Under Maryland governor Larry Hogan, Tong joined the Asian Hate Crimes Workforce to counter the rise of anti-Asian activity.

Since 2017, Tong has been the CEO of The National Asian Pacific Islander American Chamber of Commerce & Entrepreneurship (National ACE). In response to the disproportional impact of the COVID-19 pandemic on AAPI small businesses, Tong formed a business recovery and resiliency initiative through National ACE and has been helping millennial APPI entrepreneurs in the pandemic. Concerning the recovery of AAPI-owned small businesses, Tong said, "Congress needs to ensure there is a robust, long-term response to the COVID-19 crisis."
