= Rob Fairweather =

American government official

Director of the Office of Management and Budget
- Acting; January 20, 2021 – March 24, 2021
- President: Joe Biden
- Preceded by: Russell Vought
- Succeeded by: Shalanda Young (acting)

Rob Fairweather is an American economist and government official who served as the acting director of the Office of Management and Budget (OMB) from January 2021 to March 2021.

== Career ==
Fairweather first served as a Labor Economist in the Department of Labor from 1975 to 1977. He later held positions at the Office of Management and Budget (OMB), including Budget Examiner and Chief of the Environment Branch. From 2001 to 2010, he was Deputy Associate Director for Natural Resources at OMB, overseeing federal agencies such as the Department of Agriculture, the Department of the Interior, and the Environmental Protection Agency. In this role, he was involved in budget planning and policy coordination across multiple natural resource and environmental programs.

Political offices
Preceded by Russell Vought	Director of the Office of Management and Budget; Acting; 2021	Succeeded by Shalanda Young; Acting
