= Adam J. Sullivan =

American government official

Assistant Secretary of Transportation for Governmental Affairs
- In office February 28, 2018 – January 20, 2021
- President: Donald Trump
- Preceded by: Dana G. Gresham
- Succeeded by: Mohsin Syed

Personal details
- Education: Simpson College; George Washington University

Adam Joseph Sullivan is an American government official. Formerly a staff member of the United States Senate Appropriations Subcommittee on Labor, Health and Human Services, and Education, he was confirmed by the Senate on February 13, 2018 by Voice Vote as Assistant Secretary for Governmental Affairs in the United States Department of Transportation. This role made Sullivan the U.S. Department of Transportation's chief adviser on congressional relations.

Previously, Sullivan served as chief of staff for Representatives Jack Kingston (R-Ga.) and Jim Ross Lightfoot (R-Iowa) and as Deputy Assistant Secretary of Labor for Congressional Affairs during the George W. Bush administration. He also worked for defense contractor Harris Corporation.
