= Dragonfly (search engine) =

Google search engine prototype for China

The Dragonfly project was an Internet search engine prototype created by Google that was designed to be compatible with China's state censorship provisions. The public learned of Dragonfly's existence in August 2018, when The Intercept leaked an internal memo written by a Google employee about the project. In December 2018, Dragonfly was reported to have "effectively been shut down" after a clash with members of the privacy team within Google. However, according to employees, work on Dragonfly was still continuing as of March 2019, with some 100 people still allocated to it.

In July 2019, Google announced that work on Dragonfly had been terminated.

== Development ==
The Dragonfly search engine was reportedly designed to link users' phone numbers to their search queries and censor websites such as Wikipedia and those that publish information about freedom of speech, human rights, democracy, religion, and other issues considered sensitive by the Chinese government. It is not designed to notify searchers when the information they want has been censored. On September 21, 2018, The Intercept reported on an internal memo authored by a Google engineer which contained details about the project. According to a transcript of a July 18 meeting published by The Intercept, Google's search engine chief Ben Gomes stated that although the future was "unpredictable", he wanted the app to be ready to launch in "six to nine months".

Google executives stated in 2018 that Dragonfly was "exploratory", "in early stages" and that Google was "not close to launching a search product in China". In a mid-October 2018 presentation, Google CEO Sundar Pichai discussed Dragonfly, stating, "We don't know whether we could or would do this in China, but we felt it was important for us to explore." He praised the prototype, saying it would provide better information to users than do the other search engines currently operating in China. He specifically highlighted Google's ability to provide accurate search results regarding the efficacy of certain medical treatments, alluding to the death of Wei Zexi, a Baidu user who died after receiving an experimental cancer treatment that he had learned of via a promoted result on that search engine. He also said that the scope of the censorship carried out by the Dragonfly prototype would be limited: if launched, the search engine would return results for 99% of queries by Chinese citizens and leave only 1% unanswered. He acknowledged that, at one point, 100+ people were working on Dragonfly.

In late November 2018, an engineer who worked on Dragonfly told The Intercept that Google had shut their privacy and security teams out of the project. However, a director of security and privacy at Google said she "saw no sidelining whatsoever." Google issued a statement, saying privacy reviews were "non-negotiable".

In late November, an open letter to the public was published on Medium signed by hundreds of Google employees in opposition to the “Dragonfly” search engine. The employees felt that this search engine violated the user's privacy and did not align with the values of the company that they agreed to work for. The employees felt that this search engine would cause oppression among the Chinese citizens and abused human rights—which is not a part of Google's company values. Previously, Google stayed out of the Chinese market because they did not want to have to alter their values on human rights and privacy to comply with the Chinese government, so when the news broke about the search engine, many employees agreed to publicly sign a letter to show their alliance with Amnesty International to show their opposition to the project.

== Historical background and precedent ==
Google's relations with China have been fraught since the tech giant's arrival there in 2006. Google's first China-specific platform, Google.cn, was also a self-censored one: like the Dragonfly prototype, it was engineered so as not to return results for topics blacklisted by the Chinese government. Unlike Dragonfly, though, Google.cn was set up to notify searchers when the results they sought had been removed. In response to criticism over Google.cn at the time of its launch, Google asserted that "while removing search results is inconsistent with our mission, providing no information is more inconsistent with our mission," referring to the alternative of not servicing Chinese users at all. Google also downplayed the extent of the new search engine's censorship, reminding users that it also removes search results from its German, French, and U.S. platforms in order to comply with local government regulations in those countries. Ultimately, Google.cn received tepid acceptance: some commentators even praised the search engine with the logic that Chinese citizens, through conducting searches and observing which results had been removed, could better their understanding of what it was their government did not want them to see.

In January 2010, Google fell victim to Operation Aurora, a sophisticated series of cyberattacks carried out by Chinese hackers who targeted a number of major U.S. corporations, including Yahoo, Adobe, Dow Chemical, and Morgan Stanley. The hackers stole Google source code and gained access to the Gmail accounts of several prominent Chinese human rights activists who were living abroad. In response to both the attack and what then-Google-CEO Sergey Brin called a "broader pattern" of China's surveillance of human rights activists, Google discontinued Google.cn and began rerouting Chinese users to Google.hk, an uncensored (at least on Google's end) search engine based out of Hong Kong. Almost immediately, the Chinese government blocked Chinese users' access to certain results produced by that engine. Brin justified Google's sudden policy switch by arguing that operating a search engine in China no longer aligned with Google's goals of advancing internet freedom, as the company had been seeing a daily increase in requests for certain topics or search terms to be censored, rather than the other way around. Google faced widespread criticism for the decision which some commentators called a "face saving capitulation": an attempt by Google to take a stand for internet freedom while still preserving their share of the Chinese market. Other critics alleged that Google's shuttering of Google.cn was simply a well-timed business move—made because the company had only a 35% market share after four years in China—that had little to do with either Operation Aurora or Beijing's growing demands for censored content.

== Risks and rewards ==
From March 2010, when Google stopped serving China via Google.cn, to 2018, China's internet user population has increased by 70%, to 772 million users. This means that, for Google, who makes most of its revenue from advertisements run on its search engines, the potential profits of reentering the Chinese search engine market are enormous. Yet, analysts have suggested that if Google does reenter China—either with the Dragonfly prototype or a different search model—it might initially struggle to meet its revenue goals. Google's advertising strategy is highly targeted: it involves collecting data on users' search histories and using that data to present users with advertisements which are applicable to them. Google has missed out on gathering nearly a decade of data about prospective Chinese users, making that advertising strategy difficult to execute, at least immediately. Additionally, it is not clear that Google's search product would be able to outcompete Chinese search engines Baidu and Sogou, which have formally-established (and highly coveted) partnerships with technology platforms such as Windows and WeChat, respectively.

Because Google is not available to users in China, the company wanted to find some way to gain access to the Chinese market. The Google Dragonfly search engine was designed specifically for use on Android smartphones. Once this application was downloaded to a smartphone, Dragonfly could easily be allowed to track an individual's searches. This could be cause for concern for Chinese consumers because if they were to search for something that was deemed illegal by the Chinese government, such information could result in interrogation or other legal consequences.

Developers of the Google Dragonfly search engine planned to alter the accuracy of weather and air quality indices provided to consumers in China. Falsified weather changes would downplay the severity of pollution, thus keeping Chinese citizens less informed and more complacent about the actual quality of their air.

== Responses to the project ==
=== Criticism ===
Project Dragonfly has been subject to harsh criticism, particularly from Google employees and users. Shortly after publication of The Intercept article leaking details of the project, 1,400 Google employees signed a letter demanding more transparency about Dragonfly, as well as more say in the nature of the work done by Google in general. In late August Senior Google Research Scientist Jack Poulson resigned in protest. In September 2018, Amnesty International released an open letter to Google's management condemning the project as an "alarming capitulation by Google on human rights" and calling for its cancellation. At the end of November 2018, a number of Google employees authored a Medium article in support of Amnesty International's letter. They argued that a Dragonfly launch would set a precedent for the implementation of censored Google services in other countries, and expressed concern about Dragonfly's potential to contribute to a program of widespread state surveillance in China. China is rumored to have been developing a "social credit system" which assigns each citizen a "score" based on their actions, conducted both online and offline. Purchasing alcohol and jaywalking reduce a citizen's score, for example, while purchasing diapers increases it. Chinese corporations are required by law to disclose the consumer data they collect to the government, presumably in part so it can be used to calculate these scores. Analysts have theorized that, if Dragonfly becomes a reality, Google could be compelled to do the same.

Following the publication of a second The Intercept article about the project, which alleged that Google bypassed standard security and privacy checks of Dragonfly, Google engineer Liz Fong-Jones tweeted a proposal for Google employees worldwide to go on strike. She wrote that the "red line" for initiating the strike will be crossed if Google launches Dragonfly without conducting a thorough security and privacy review, or if evidence emerges that members of Google's Security and Privacy team were coerced into approving the project. Fong-Jones has started a preemptive "strike fund" intended to support Google employees should they leave their positions, to which Google employees have already donated over $200K.

Politicians have also spoken out. In early October 2018, Mike Pence called for an end to the development of Dragonfly, and said that, if launched, it would strengthen Communist Party censorship and compromise the privacy of Chinese customers. In early December 2018, Senator Mark Warner (D-VA) criticized both Beijing and Google over the project, stating that Dragonfly evidences China's success at "recruit[ing] Western companies to their information control efforts."

Chairman of the Joint Chiefs of Staff General Joseph Dunford also criticized Google, stating that "it’s inexplicable" that Google continues investing in autocratic communist China, which uses censorship technology to restrain freedoms and crackdown on online speech, and has long history of intellectual property and patent theft that hurts U.S. companies, while simultaneously not renewing further research and development collaborations with the Pentagon. He said “I’m not sure that people at Google will enjoy a world order that is informed by the norms and standards of Russia or China.” He urged Google work directly with the U.S. government instead of making controversial inroads into China.

=== Support ===
Amid widespread backlash, one contingent of Google employees has expressed its support for the project. In late November 2018, a Google employee submitted an unsigned letter to TechCrunch, an online technology news platform, calling for work on Dragonfly to continue because the project aligns with Google's mission to "organize the world's information and make it universally accessible and useful." The letter states that, although Dragonfly has the power to "do more harm than good," it is valuable in that it can shed light on "how different approaches may work out in China." Three anonymous Google employees from China said they supported the project, citing a need for a competitor to the Chinese search engine Baidu, Petal, Sogou.

== Termination of project ==
In testimony given to the U.S. Senate Judiciary Committee in July 2019, Karan Bhatia, the vice president of public policy at Google, announced that work on Dragonfly had been "terminated".

While the launch of Dragonfly was terminated, Google did not promise that any work with Chinese censorship in the future will be out of the question. However, there are no current plans in the making. Bhatia made a comment during his U.S. Senate Judiciary hearing that “any decision to ever look at going back into the China search market is one that we would take only in consultation with key stakeholders.”

== See also ==
- Criticism of Google
- Google China
- Websites blocked in mainland China
