= Derek Kan =

American businessman and politician (born 1978)

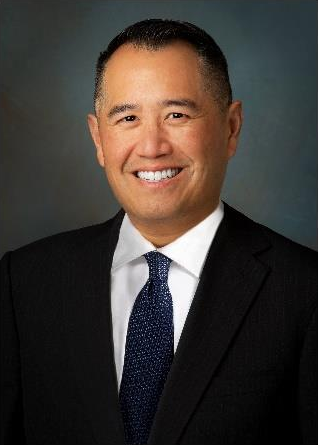

Governor of the United States Postal Service
- Incumbent
- Assumed office May 20, 2022
- Appointed by: Joe Biden
- Preceded by: John McLeod Barger

Deputy Director of the Office of Management and Budget
- In office July 30, 2020 – December 2020
- President: Donald Trump
- Preceded by: Russell Vought
- Succeeded by: Shalanda Young

Under Secretary of Transportation for Policy
- In office December 4, 2017 – July 2019
- President: Donald Trump
- Preceded by: Blair Anderson
- Succeeded by: Carlos Monje

Member of the Amtrak Board of Directors
- In office December 15, 2015 – c. May 2019
- President: Barack Obama; Donald Trump
- Preceded by: Nancy A. Naples
- Succeeded by: Joel Szabat

Personal details
- Born: Derek Tai-Ching Kan; August 15, 1978 (age 47) Los Angeles, California, U.S.
- Party: Republican
- Education: University of Southern California (BA); London School of Economics (MSc); Stanford University (MBA)

Derek Kan
- Traditional Chinese: 甘達慶
- Simplified Chinese: 甘达庆
Transcriptions
Standard Mandarin
- Hanyu Pinyin: Gān Dáqìng

Derek Tai-Ching Kan (Chinese: 甘達慶; born August 15, 1978) is an American businessman and government official who has served as a governor of the United States Postal Service since 2022. He served as deputy director of the Office of Management and Budget in 2020. Kan served as the under secretary of transportation for policy from 2017 to 2019. He was confirmed by the Senate four times.

In the private sector, he has worked for various tech startups, Bain & Co., Elliott Management, Lyft, Oaktree Capital Management, and Toll Brothers.

He is an alumnus of the University of Southern California, the London School of Economics, and Stanford University.

== Career ==
Kan became a Presidential Management Fellow at the Office of Management and Budget in 2004.

From 2006 to 2010, Kan was as a policy adviser to Senate Majority Leader Mitch McConnell.

Kan served as chief economist for the Senate Republican Policy Committee. He served during the 2008 financial crisis and the implementation of Dodd-Frank.

He worked as a management consultant at Bain & Company from 2012 to 2014.

Kan worked as director of strategy at Genapsys, a biotech startup in Silicon Valley from 2014 to 2015. It was later acquired by Sequencing Health.

He was as an advisor at Elliott Management Corporation.

In 2015, President Barack Obama nominated Kan for the board of Amtrak; his appointment was unanimously confirmed by the Senate.

Prior to assuming his Transportation Department position, Kan was the general manager of the Southern California region for Lyft. Kan worked at Lyft from 2015 to 2017.

In April 2017, Kan was nominated by President Donald Trump to become under secretary of transportation for policy in the United States Department of Transportation. He was confirmed by the Senate on November 13, 2017. His work at the Department of Transportation focused heavily on self-driving cars. In July 2019, Kan resigned from his position in the Department of Transportation to take on the position of executive associate director at the Office of Management and Budget.

In 2019, the Trump administration briefly considered Kan for a Federal Reserve board seat.

In 2020, Kan was appointed to the White House Coronavirus Task Force.

In November 2021, President Biden announced he would appoint Kan to the Board of Governors of the United States Postal Service. On May 12, 2022, his nomination was confirmed in the United States Senate by voice vote.

As of 2021, Kan worked as an outside advisor to Oaktree Capital Group with a focus on infrastructure and emerging technology.

In December of 2021, Kan was appointed to the board of Toll Brothers.

As of 2022, Kan served on the board of Deliverr, a startup focused on e-commerce fulfillment services. His work continued after the firm was acquired by Shopify where, as of 2023, he was a vice president.

== Education ==
Kan holds an MBA from Stanford University, where he was an Arjay Miller Scholar. He studied economic history at the London School of Economics where he earned a MSc. Kan earned a BS in business administration from the University of Southern California.
