= Karan Bhatia =

American attorney

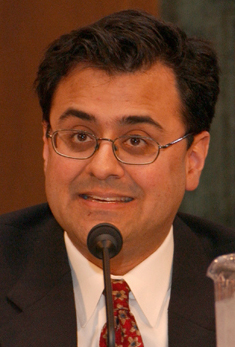
- Bhatia in 2003

Personal details
- Born: Karan Krishna Bhatia Washington D.C., U.S.
- Party: Republican
- Education: Princeton University (BA); London School of Economics (MA); Columbia University (JD)

Karan Krishna Bhatia is an American attorney and former senior official in the Bush administration. He currently leads public policy and government relations for Alphabet Inc. (formerly Google). He served as the deputy U.S. Trade Representative from 2005 to 2007, credited with leading the negotiation of the United States–Korea Free Trade Agreement. Additional appointments include Assistant Secretary of Transportation for Aviation and International Affairs where he served from 2003 to 2005 and deputy under secretary of commerce for industry and security from 2001 to 2003. He served a total of six years in the Bush administration before returning to the private sector in 2008 to lead government affairs for General Electric.

== Early life and education ==
Bhatia's family is originally from Uttar Pradesh, but he was born in Washington D.C. His father is a retired official for the World Bank and of Indian descent, moving to the United States in the 1960s. His mother is English and retired as well. He attended Princeton where he received a bachelor's degree in International Relations. He went on to earn his master's degree from the London School of Economics prior to attending Columbia Law School.

== Career ==
Bhatia clerked for U.S. District Court Judge Milton Pollack upon graduating from law school. Bhatia was a former partner with the law firm Wilmer Cutler Pickering Hale and Dorr. He was the firm's administrative partner for its international aviation and defense practice area as well as a member of its international and corporate groups. Bhatia also worked many pro bono cases including representing victims of the Oklahoma City bombing during the trials of Timothy McVeigh and Terry Nichols. In addition to his work as an attorney, Bhatia was an adjunct professor at Georgetown University Law Center where he co-taught international civil litigation from 1999 until 2003.

=== Department of Commerce ===
Bhatia began working at the U.S. Department of Commerce in 2001 as chief counsel for export control administration. Bhatia was appointed in 2002 to the position of Deputy Under Secretary of Commerce for the Bureau of Industry and Security. He was the second Indian American in the Bush administration to hold such a senior-level position, after Bobby Jindal.

=== U.S Department of Transportation ===
Bhatia was nominated by President George W. Bush in September 2003 for the position of Assistant Secretary of Transportation for Aviation and International Affairs. During his time at the department, he was the key international policy advisor to Secretary Norman Mineta. He was involved with negotiating international air services agreements on behalf of the United States, including the air route agreement between the US Department of Transportation and the Civil Aviation Administration of China that allowed both the United States and China to increase the amount of air travel between the two countries.

=== Deputy U.S. Trade Representative ===
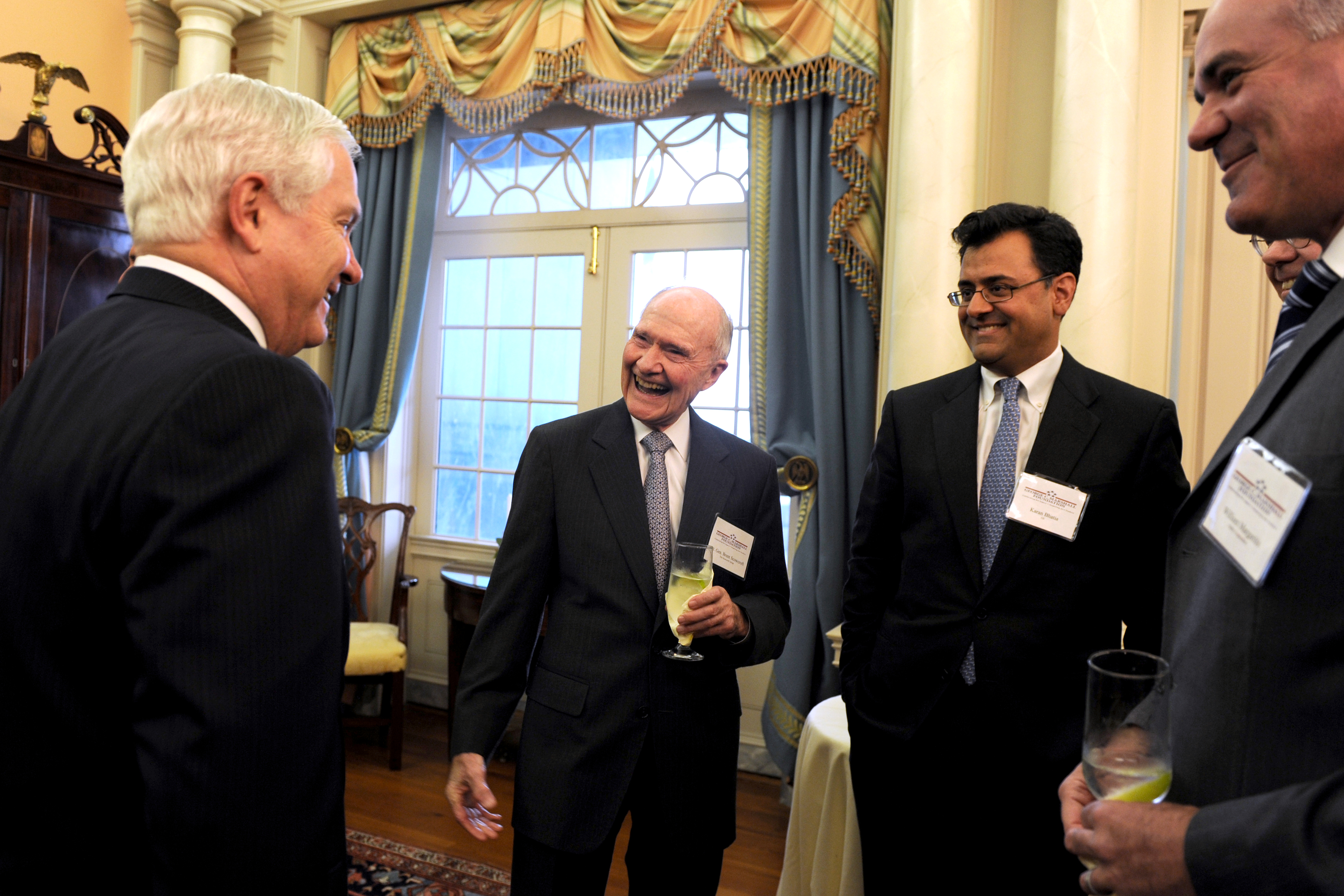
Defense Secretary Robert M. Gates shares a laugh with retired Air Force Lt. Gen. Brent Scowcroft, center, and Karan Bhatia, second from right, during the George C. Marshall Foundation Award presentation at the State Department in Washington, D.C., Oct. 16, 2009.

In 2005, President George W. Bush nominated Bhatia to the position of Deputy U.S. Trade Representative, a position that holds the rank of Ambassador. The nomination was confirmed by the Senate in October 2005. During his time in appointment, Bhatia oversaw the negotiation of the U.S. - Korea Free Trade Agreement, the first free trade agreement between the United States and a major Asian economy. He also led U.S. negotiations with Vietnam on the U.S. - Vietnam Bilateral WTO Accession Agreement which allowed American companies to have more access to the Vietnamese marketplace. He also signed the agreement on behalf of the United States.

=== General Electric ===
It was announced that Bhatia would be leaving the U.S. Trade Representative's Office and returning to the private sector, becoming the Vice President and Senior Counsel of International Law & Policy for General Electric in 2008. At GE, Bhatia is credited with building a global government relations team that helped drive the company's global growth.

=== Google ===
In 2018, Bhatia left GE to join Google as their new Global Head of Policy, tasked with overseeing the company's policy discussions on issues such as AI, job creation and infrastructure. During his first year in the position, he incorporated “government affairs” into his division's name, placing it before “public policy” to emphasize relationship building over the production of white paper reports. He also reduced the number of contract lobbyists working within the unit. During a hearing before the U.S. Senate Judiciary Committee in July 2019, Bhatia confirmed that the company's effort to launch a search engine in China codenamed Project Dragonfly had been abandoned, in response to questions from Republican Senator Josh Hawley regarding Google's business dealings with China.

== Personal life ==
Bhatia and his wife, Sara, have two sons.
