= Judith Kaleta =

American government official

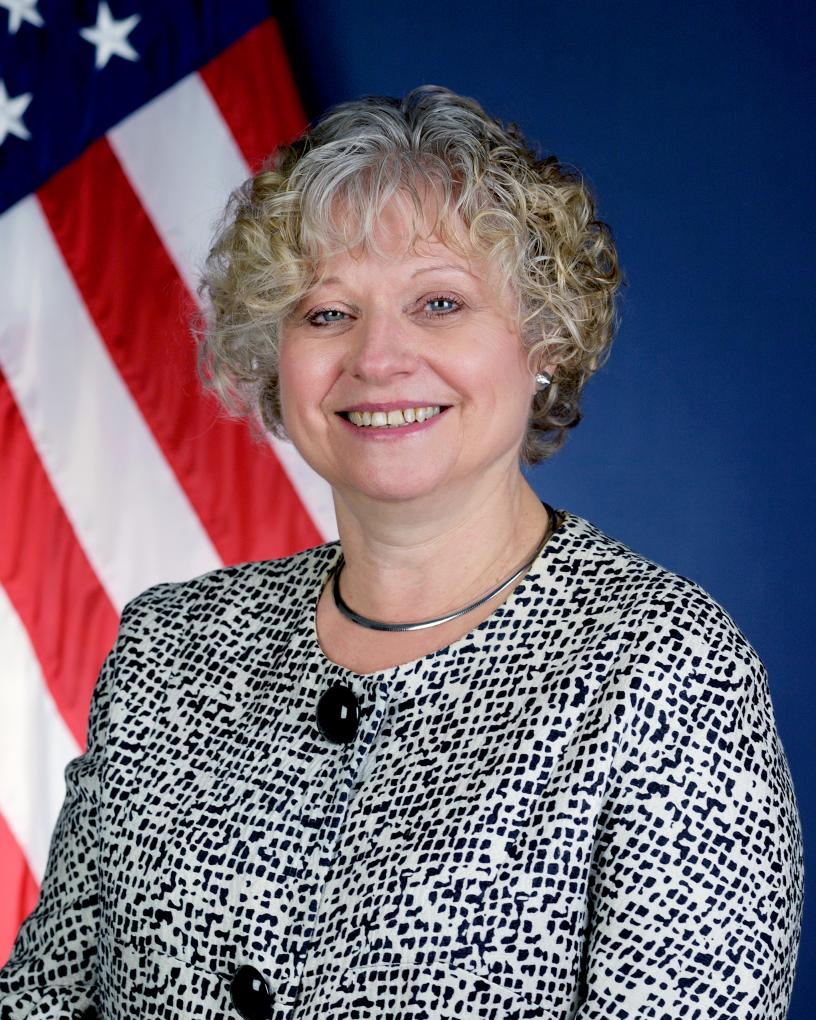
- Official portrait, 2025

Acting United States Secretary of Transportation
- In office January 20, 2025 – January 28, 2025
- President: Donald Trump
- Preceded by: Pete Buttigieg
- Succeeded by: Sean Duffy

Personal details
- Education: DePaul University (BA); Loyola University Chicago (JD)

Judith Sue Kaleta is an American government official who has served as the Deputy General Counsel of the U.S. Department of Transportation since 2012. She also served briefly as Acting U.S. Secretary of Transportation.

== Education and career ==
Kaleta is a summa cum laude graduate of DePaul University and Loyola University of Chicago School of Law.

Early in her career, Kaleta served as an Assistant Attorney General in the Consumer Protection Division of the Office of the Illinois Attorney General. In the U.S. Department of Transportation, she served as Chief Counsel of the Research and Special Programs Administration, and then Assistant General Counsel for Law.

Kaleta has served as Deputy General Counsel of the Department of Transportation since 2012. She served as Acting Secretary of Transportation during January 20–28, 2025.

A member of the American Bar Association (ABA), Ms. Kaleta serves in the ABA House of Delegates. She has served as a member of the Council of the ABA's Section of Administrative Law and Regulatory Practice and Section of Dispute Resolution. Kaleta is the recipient of the 2016 Mary C. Lawton Award for Outstanding Government Service, presented by the ABA's Section of Administrative Law and Regulatory Practice. She is also a Fellow of the American Bar Foundation.

Political offices
Preceded by Pete Buttigieg	United States Secretary of Transportation; Acting; 2025	Succeeded by Sean Duffy
