= Under Secretary of Transportation for Policy =

Under Secretary of Transportation for Policy of Transportation
- Seal of the department

- Flag of the Department of Transportation

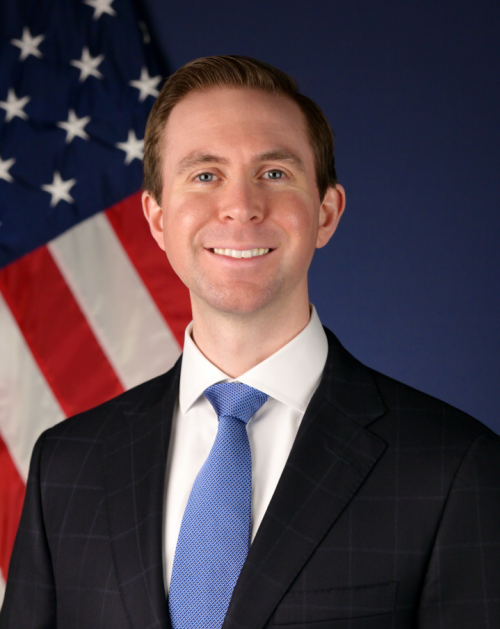
- Incumbent; Ryan McCormack since March 26, 2026
- United States Department of Transportation
- Reports to: Secretary of Transportation; Deputy Secretary of Transportation
- Appointer: The president with Senate advice and consent
- Term length: No fixed term 49 U.S.C. § 102
- Salary: Executive Schedule, level II5 U.S.C. § 5313
- Website: www.transportation.gov/policy

The under secretary of transportation for policy is a position within the United States Department of Transportation. The under secretary serves as an advisor to the secretary and deputy secretary of transportation on matters of transportation policy.

From July 2019 to January 2021, Joel Szabat served as acting under secretary, succeeding Derek Kan. He left office on January 20, 2021.

Carlos Monje served as under secretary from July 2021 to April 2024, having been confirmed by the U.S. Senate on June 24, 2021 by voice vote. He was sworn into office by Secretary Pete Buttigieg on July 7, 2021.
