= Ryan McCormack =

American government official

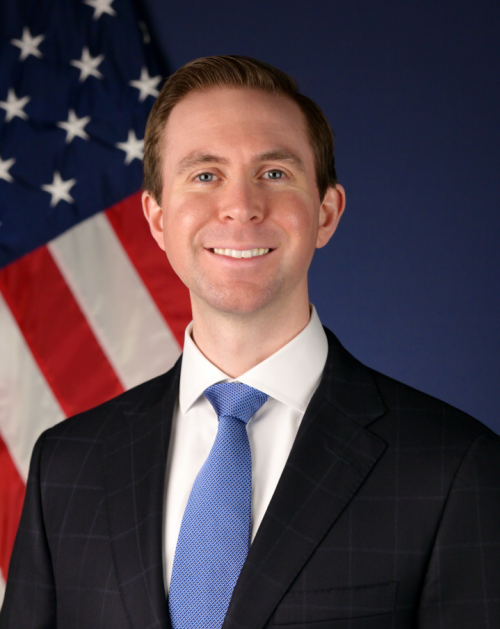
- McCormack in 2026

Under Secretary of Transportation for Policy
- Incumbent
- Assumed office March 26, 2026
- President: Donald Trump
- Preceded by: Carlos Monje

Personal details
- Party: Republican
- Education: Canisius University

Ryan McCormack is an American public servant, serving as Under Secretary Transportation for Policy at the U.S. Department of Transportation.

== Early life and education ==
McCormack is a 2011 graduate of Canisius University.

== Career ==
McCormack began working on Capitol Hill in 2013 as a staff assistant to then-Congressman Sean Duffy. He worked in Congressman Duffy's office until 2019, rising to the role of Legislative Director. He also took leave from the House of Representatives to work on Duffy's Congressional campaigns.

From 2019 to 2021, McCormack worked for the EX-IM Bank.

McCormack rejoined Duffy at the Department of Transportation in January 2025, serving as deputy chief of staff before being nominated to serve as Under Secretary for Policy in September 2025. He spoke in favor of the Department of Transportation's policies to direct federal funding to areas with higher birth rates.

In February 2026, the Senate confirmed McCormack's nomination.
