= Carlos Monje =

American government official and advisor

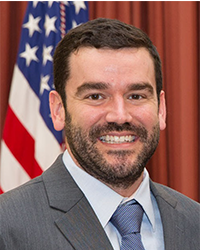

Under Secretary of Transportation for Policy
- In office July 7, 2021 – April 2024
- President: Joe Biden
- Preceded by: Christopher Coes (acting)
- Succeeded by: Ryan McCormack

Personal details
- Born: New Orleans, Louisiana, U.S.
- Party: Democratic
- Education: Harvard University (BA)

Carlos Alberto Monje Jr. is an American government official and senior advisor to Secretary Pete Buttigieg. He served as the Under Secretary of Transportation for Policy within the Biden administration from July 2021 to April 2024.

== Early life and education ==
Monje is the first in his family born in the United States; his family is from Argentina. He graduated from Harvard University.

== Career ==
=== Obama administration ===
Monje served as deputy policy director at Obama for America and a special assistant in President Obama's DC Senate office where he handled homeland security and veterans affairs. Monje was chief of staff of the United States Domestic Policy Council and Special Assistant to the President during the Obama administration. He previously served as Acting Under Secretary and he was nominated by President Barack Obama in 2014 and 2015 to be the Assistant Secretary for Transportation Policy for the U.S. Department of Transportation, he was confirmed by the Senate on March 16, 2015, by a vote of 94–0. He then oversaw implementation of surface transportation programs, the discretionary grant programs, and efforts to promote equity and economic development.

=== Hillary Clinton presidential campaign ===
Monje left the Obama administration to join the Hillary Clinton 2016 presidential campaign.

=== Twitter ===
From March 2017 until September 2020, Monje was responsible for managing Twitter's public policy and government affairs in the U.S. and Canada.

In 2018, Monje participated in an investigation into the Alliance for Securing Democracy's Hamilton 68 dashboard.

=== Biden administration ===
On April 22, 2021, President Joe Biden nominated him to be the Under Secretary of Transportation for Policy. On May 20, 2021, a hearing on his nomination was held before the Senate Commerce Committee. He was reported out favorably from the committee on June 16, 2021. On June 24, 2021, Monje was confirmed by the United States Senate via voice vote.

He was sworn into office on July 7, 2021, by Secretary Pete Buttigieg.

Monje resigned his position in April 2024.

== Personal life ==
Monje is a native of New Orleans. He met his wife, Anne Filipic, while they both worked on the Obama campaign in 2008.
