= Assistant Secretary of Transportation for Aviation and International Affairs =

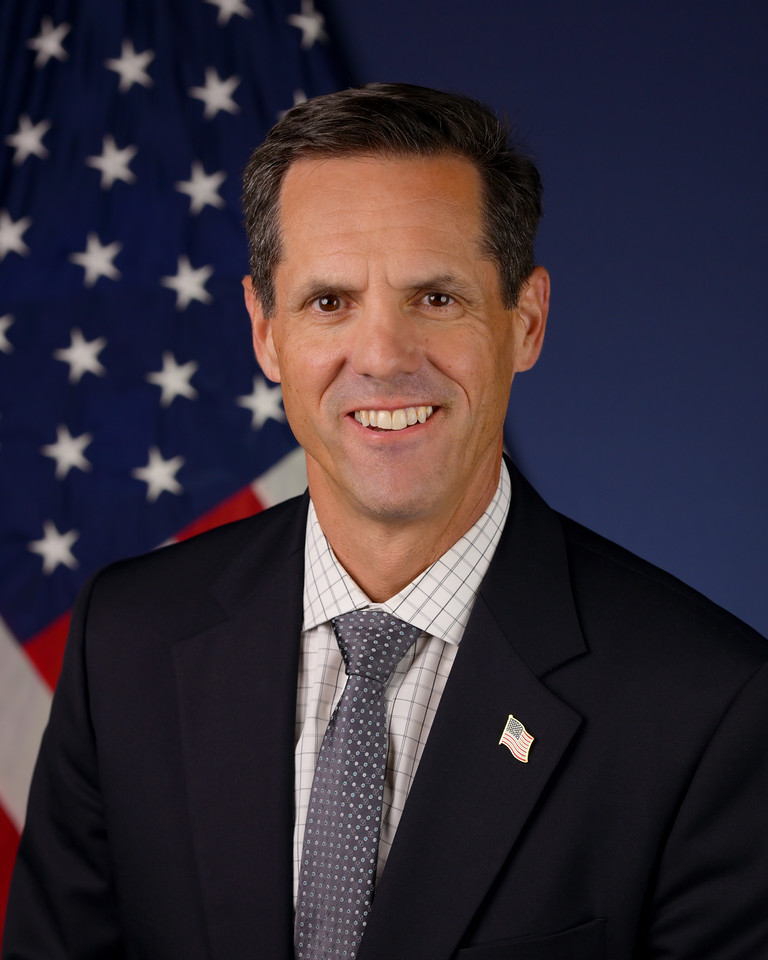
- Incumbent; Daniel J. Edwards since May 19, 2026
- Appointer: The president; with Senate advice and consent

The assistant secretary for aviation and international affairs is the head of the Office of Aviation and International Affairs within the United States Department of Transportation.

== Background ==
The assistant secretary is appointed by the president and confirmed by the United States Senate. The assistant secretary is paid at level IV of the Executive Schedule, meaning he or she receives a basic annual salary of $143,000. The current assistant secretary is Annie Petsonk. Previous assistant secretaries include Karan Bhatia, Read C. Van DeWater, and Francisco Sanchez.

== Responsibilities ==
The assistant secretary has responsibility for licensing of U.S. and foreign airlines and for formulating U.S. international aviation policy. The assistant secretary is also responsible for the administration of the Department of Transportation's economic policies and programs designed to promote access to, competition in, and the health of the U.S. aviation system. The assistant secretary coordinates departmental policies and programs in all modes of international transportation and trade.
