= Andrew B. Steinberg =

Aviation regulatory lawyer

- Born: October 12, 1958; Perth Amboy, New Jersey
- Died: May 20, 2012 (aged 53); Chevy Chase, Maryland
- Education: Princeton University, Harvard Law School
- Occupation: Aviation Lawyer
- Employer: Jones Day
- Spouse: Married
- Children: 2 (daughter Madeline and son Malcolm)

Andrew Bart Steinberg (October 12, 1958 – May 20, 2012) was a leading aviation regulatory lawyer, who held several key posts in the public and private sectors in the United States. He served until 2008 as the Assistant Secretary for Aviation and International Affairs within the United States Department of Transportation, after being confirmed to the position by the U.S. Senate on September 29, 2006, following appointment by President George W. Bush. Prior to that post, he had been appointed by the president in May 2003, as the chief counsel of the Federal Aviation Administration, where he served as the top legal advisor to FAA Administrator Marion C. Blakey. Steinberg was a partner in the Washington D.C. office of the international law firm of Jones Day, where he led the firm's aviation regulatory practice, a post once held by aviation pioneer L. Welch Pogue.

== Education and career ==
From 2000 to 2002, Steinberg was executive vice president of administration, general counsel and corporate secretary for Travelocity.com, Inc., the online travel site, following its acquisition of Preview Travel, Inc.

From 1996 to 2000, he was senior vice president and then executive vice president, general counsel and secretary of Sabre, Inc., a leading provider of computerized reservation systems and information technology to the travel industry.

From 1990 to 1996, he held a number of senior positions within the legal department of American Airlines, Inc., serving as associate general counsel in charge of the airline's employment and environmental legal practice, and senior attorney responsible for antitrust matters.

From 1986 to 1990, he was associated with the Los Angeles-based law firm of Gibson, Dunn and Crutcher, where he practiced antitrust law and commercial litigation.

Immediately prior to joining the Department of Transportation, Steinberg was vice president, general counsel and secretary of Church & Dwight Co., Inc., a diversified consumer packaged goods and industrial products company with $1.5 billion in sales.

Steinberg earned his bachelor's degree in politics magna cum laude from Princeton University and graduated cum laude from Harvard Law School. After law school he served as a judicial law clerk to the Honorable Richard A. Gadbois, Jr. in the United States District Court for the Central District of California.

== Assistant Secretary for Aviation and International Affairs ==
As Assistant Secretary, Steinberg handled several heavily contested and controversial matters. He granted economic authority to Virgin America to begin flights in the U.S., over the heavy opposition of U.S. airlines and labor unions, finding that the airline was not under the control of Virgin Group’s Richard Branson. He tried unsuccessfully to end federally subsidized flights to 65 smaller communities, saying the Essential Air Service program did not work and needed reform. About a possible merger in 2007, between US Airways and Delta Air Lines, Steinberg said in congressional testimony that while any merger immediately reduces the number of competitors, ultimately market forces would play out to benefit consumers.

On the international front, under Secretary Mary Peters, he led DOT’s efforts in 2007, to secure an “Open Skies” agreement with the European Union. Steinberg helped negotiate an agreement with the Civil Aviation Administration of China (CAAC) that doubled air routes to the U.S., and then signed an order giving United Airlines and Delta Air Lines access to coveted new routes to China (from San Francisco to Guangzhou and from Atlanta to Shanghai respectively). He opposed the inclusion of aviation in Europe's Emissions Trading Scheme, claiming it "would violate international law and undercut international efforts to better manage the impact of aviation emissions," a position disputed by EU authorities. He also promoted the use of satellite-based air traffic systems as part of efforts to modernize legacy air traffic control systems in the U.S. and elsewhere.

== FAA Chief Counsel ==
At the FAA, Steinberg oversaw a staff of 290 individuals, including approximately 200 aviation lawyers, located in Washington and in the agency's 11 regional offices and technical centers. In 2006, he issued a cease and desist order against a jet management company that the FAA claimed was involved in illegal operations as an air carrier and was linked to a crash at Teterboro Airport. He also defended the agency's decision, after an impasse with the National Air Traffic Controllers Association, to impose a new contract on NATCA.

== Private law practice ==
At Jones Day, Steinberg has represented large airline clients opposed to FAA efforts to increase safety regulation, including new limits on pilot work hours. He also defended a commuter airline, Gulfstream International Airlines, against FAA safety allegations over alleged maintenance and work rule violations after the airline's training academy came under scrutiny in the Colgan Flight 3407 crash. He has been critical of the slow pace of modernization of the air traffic control system under the FAA “NextGen” program. He claimed that President Barack Obama's National Mediation Board would take various procedural steps to benefit airline labor unions, which later occurred. Earlier in his career, Steinberg represented American Airlines in defeating claims of predatory pricing and attempted monopolization by Continental Airlines and Northwest Airlines, who were represented by prominent plaintiff's attorneys David Boies and Joe Jamail.

== Awards ==
In 2008, Steinberg won the Stratospheric Ozone Protection Award (now known as the Montreal Protocol Award) from the Environmental Protection Agency for his work representing the United States at the International Civil Aviation Organization (ICAO), on preservation of the ozone layer.

In 2013, Steinberg was awarded (posthumously) the L. Welch Pogue Award for Lifetime Achievement in Aviation.
