= Jane Garvey =

Jane Garvey may refer to:

- Jane Garvey (aviation administrator), head of the U.S. Federal Aviation Administration, 1997–2002
- Jane Garvey (broadcaster) (born 1964), British radio presenter
