= Delford =

Delford is a given name. Notable people with the name include:

- Delford M. Smith (1930–2014), American aviator and businessman
- Robert Delford Brown (1930–2009), American performance artist

== See also ==
- Oradell, New Jersey, also known as "Delford"
- Laurine Delforge
