= International Institute of Air and Space Law =

- The institution's logo.
- Founder: Professor Henri Wassenbergh
- Established: 1985
- Mission: contribute to the development of aviation and space law
- Director: Prof. Dr. Steven Truxal
- Staff: Five
- Location: Leiden, Netherlands
- Coordinates: 52.15632°N 4.49058°E
- Interactive map of International Institute of Air and Space Law
- Website: http://law.leiden.edu/organisation/publiclaw/iiasl/

The International Institute of Air and Space Law (IIASL) is a leading research and teaching institution. It specialises in legal and policy issues for aviation and space activities. It forms part of the Leiden Law School at Leiden University.

The institute co-operates with many sister institutions and maintains contact with national and international organisations throughout the world.

It is guided by an International Advisory Board populated by people professionally involved with the development of aviation and space-related activities who meet at least once per year.

It organises courses and conferences on all aspects of aviation and space law and policy.

== History ==
The first professor appointed to teach air law was Daniel Goedhuis in 1938. A chair in air law was created in 1947 and extended to space law in 1961. Professor Goedhuis held it until 1977. His successor Professor Henri Wassenbergh was the catalyst for the creation of the current institute.

The institute held its Silver Jubilee in August 2011.

== Purpose ==
The purpose of the institute is to contribute to the development of aviation and space law and related policy by conducting and promoting research and teaching at university level.

== Facilities ==
The Institute possesses a modern library.
