= EDreams =

Online travel agency

eDreams
- Type: Subsidiary
- Industry: Online travel
- Founded: 1999; 27 years ago
- Founders: Javier Pérez-Tenessa; James Hare; Mauricio Prieto
- Headquarters: Barcelona, Catalonia, Spain
- Area served: Worldwide
- Key people: Dana Dunne (CEO); Christoph Dieterle (CFO); Andreas Adrian (COO)
- Products: Flights, hotels, rail, dynamic packages, car rentals, travel insurance, prime subscription
- Revenue: €344 million (H1 FY2026)
- Net income: €47.1 million (H1 FY2026)
- Parent: eDreams ODIGEO
- Website: www.edreams.com

eDreams is a global online travel agency founded in 1999 in Silicon Valley, United States, with its headquarters in Barcelona, Spain. The company is part of the eDreams ODIGEO Group.

The company was founded by Javier Pérez-Tenessa, James Hare, and Mauricio Prieto. Pérez-Tenessa was CEO from 2000 to 2015, after which Dana Dunne, previously COO, became CEO. In 2017, eDreams created Prime, a travel subscription programme that provides members with access to travel products.

eDreams has faced controversy over its online advertising, Prime subscription pricing and pricing and cancellation practices, and disputes with airlines over ticket distribution and marketing. In 2026, regulators in Italy and Australia took action over its subscription practices, while consumer organisations reported numerous complaints concerning payment, charges and free trials.

== History ==
eDreams was founded in 1999 in Silicon Valley by Javier Pérez‑Tenessa, James Hare and Mauricio Prieto, with the support of European and American financial groups such as DCM‑Doll Capital Management, Apax Partners, Atlas Venture and 3i Group, and over the following years expanded into a major European online travel business. In 2000, the company moved its headquarters to Barcelona and launched its services in the Spanish and Italian markets, becoming one of the first online travel agencies to operate in Spain.

In October 2006, the American private equity firm TA Associates acquired eDreams for €153 million in what was at the time one of the largest leveraged buyouts of an internet company in Southern Europe. In July 2010, the European private equity firm Permira acquired eDreams from TA Associates for around €350 million, becoming the majority shareholder. In June 2011, eDreams merged with GO Voyages and acquired Opodo and Travellink to form the eDreams ODIGEO group, which became one of the largest online travel companies in Europe and among the top five globally. In 2012, eDreams launched a mobile application for iOS.

In December 2015, the company relocated its headquarters within Barcelona, moving operations from the World Trade Center to new offices in the city. Since 2017, eDreams has offered its Prime travel subscription service, first introduced in France and later expanded to additional markets, including the United Kingdom, Germany, Spain, Italy, Portugal. In 2025, subscription-based ices on the eDreams platform were reported to account for a substantial share of the company’s profitability, with renewed memberships identified as a key driver of financial performance.

== Services ==
eDreams ODIGEO operates an annual subscription program called Prime, which gives members access to discounted rates on flights, hotels, travel packages, rail, and car rental. Membership includes a free trial period for new customers in all markets, and Prime became the company's primary source of recurring revenue, accounting for a substantial share of total revenue. As of 2026, Prime had almost 8 million members globally, and subscribers demonstrate higher engagement and repeat booking rates compared with non-members. Prime is available in wide range of markets, including France, Italy, Spain, the United States, Portugal, and the United Kingdom.

eDreams ODIGEO’s travel search engine uses AI algorithms to analyse user behaviour.

In 2025, eDreams' U.S. travel brand, eDreams.net, was accredited by the Better Business Bureau with an A+ rating, a recognition described by Forbes Spain as the highest possible BBB rating and notable within the travel technology sector. The Better Business Bureau has been criticized for potential conflicts of interest arising from its paid accreditation model. eDreams holds high ratings on Trustpilot.

== Awards ==
eDreams received the “Marca Recomendada de 2025” distinction in the same category from Portal da Queixa, based on consumer evaluations over the preceding year. eDreams also was listed as “Marca Recomendada de 2026” in the online travel agencies category by the Portuguese consumer review platform Portal da Queixa, based on consumer evaluations of service quality and satisfaction in Portugal. According to the World Travel Awards database, eDreams has been a nominee in multiple leading categories, including Spain’s Leading Online Travel Agency and Europe’s Leading Online Travel Agency in recent years.

== Controversies ==
=== Google advertising ===
In March 2016, the United Kingdom's Advertising Standards Authority (ASA) upheld complaints about four eDreams advertisements for Ryanair and easyJet flights. The complaints concerned sponsored search results and landing pages that gave the airlines' names and branding greater prominence than eDreams' identity, creating the impression that users were visiting the airlines' own websites. The ASA ruled that the advertisements could not appear again in the forms investigated. The dispute followed legal action initiated by Ryanair against Google and eDreams in December 2015 over sponsored search results and allegedly misleading fare displays. eDreams argued saying that it had a right to compete as an online travel agency.

=== Unfair commercial practices ===
In February 2026, Italy's competition authority fined three eDreams group companies a combined €9 million over the marketing and cancellation of its Prime subscription. The decision concerned how subscription savings and prices were presented, the promotion of the more expensive Prime Plus tier, charges imposed on some customers who were ineligible for free trials, and barriers to cancellation. Reuters reported that eDreams intended to appeal the decision.

In June 2026, Australia's consumer regulator announced that eDreams had paid A$59,400 in penalties over Prime subscription advertising. The company also gave an enforceable undertaking and admitted that its conduct had contravened or was likely to contravene Australian consumer law, including in relation to free-trial eligibility and disclosure of annual subscription costs. The undertaking included commitments to refund or credit eligible customers. In March 2026, Spain's consumer organisation OCU reported receiving approximately 1,300 complaints about eDreams over the preceding year, many concerning Prime charges and free trials.

Euroconsumers called on eDreams to compensate consumers over what it described as unfair subscription practices, alleging confusing price displays, misleading savings claims, complicated free-trial sign-ups and difficulties cancelling subscriptions. According to Euroconsumers, around 3,000 complaints had been filed against the company across Europe since 2023, including more than 200 complaints to Belgian consumer group Testachats. Testachats spokesperson Julie Frère said the complaints indicated a broader structural pattern harming consumers. eDreams denied the claims in a statement to The Brussels Times.

=== Ryanair litigation ===
eDreams and Ryanair have disputed the online sale and advertising of airline tickets in several legal proceedings. In July 2025, a Barcelona commercial court ordered Ryanair to retract statements about eDreams, finding that its campaign constituted unfair competition through denigration. Ryanair said it would appeal the ruling.

In separate Irish proceedings, Ryanair alleged that eDreams accessed its booking systems without authorisation and resold tickets at inflated prices. In June 2026, The Irish Times reported that eDreams had agreed not to access Ryanair's Travel Agent Direct booking system, resolving that dispute. In separate proceedings in July 2026, the Irish High Court allowed further Ryanair claims against eDreams to proceed.
