= L. Welch Pogue Award for Lifetime Achievement in Aviation =

The L. Welch Pogue Award for Lifetime Achievement in Aviation is an award created by Aviation Week & Space Technology that is annually presented to an individual who is "considered a visionary and a preeminent leader of contemporary aviation."

In 2011, the International Aviation Club of Washington, D.C., and the Jones Day law firm partnered with Aviation Week to present the award. (The IAC was co-sponsor again in 2016 and 2017.)

== Recipients of the L. Welch Pogue Award ==
- 1994 L. Welch Pogue, former chairman, U.S. Civil Aeronautics Board and delegate to 1944 Chicago Convention.
- 1995 Henri Wassenbergh, aviation scholar
- 1996 Adm. Donald Engen, former director, National Air and Space Museum
- 1997 Alfred E. Kahn, former chairman, U.S. Civil Aeronautics Board
- 1998 John E. Robson, former chairman, U.S. Civil Aeronautics Board
- 1999 Norman Y. Mineta, U.S. Secretary of Transportation
- 2000 Robert T. Francis II, former vice chairman, National Transportation Safety Board (U.S.)
- 2001 John Kern, vice president, regulatory compliance and chief safety officer, Northwest Airlines (retired)
- 2002 Delford M. Smith, founder and chairman, Evergreen International Aviation
- 2003 Jürgen Weber, chairman and CEO, Deutsche Lufthansa AG
- 2004 Robert Crandall, chairman and CEO, American Airlines (retired)
- 2005 Herb Kelleher, chairman and CEO, Southwest Airlines (retired)
- 2006 Jeffrey N. Shane, under secretary of transportation policy, U.S. Department of Transportation
- 2007 Professor Brian O'Keeffe, Australia, father of the Future Air Navigation System (FANS)
- 2008 Helen Muir, director, Cranfield Institute for Safety, Risk and Reliability
- 2009 (not awarded)
- 2010 (not awarded)
- 2011 Giovanni Bisignani, director general and CEO, International Air Transport Association (IATA)
- 2012 John Byerly, former U.S. deputy assistant secretary for transportation affairs
- 2013 Andrew B. Steinberg, partner, Jones Day
- 2014 Margaret ("Peggy") Gilligan, associate administrator for aviation safety, Federal Aviation Administration.
- 2015 Paul Mifsud, KLM airline
- 2016 Dave Barger, CEO, JetBlue Airways
- 2017 Jane Garvey, former administrator, Federal Aviation Administration
- 2018 Susan McDermott, Paul Gretch, Bob Goldner, and Mary Street, former DOT career officials
- 2019 Marion Blakey, former administrator of the Federal Aviation Administration and chair of the National Transportation Safety Board
- 2020 Not awarded
- 2021 Oscar Munoz, former chairman and chief executive officer of United Airlines
- 2022 Frederick W. Smith, founder and chairman of FedEx Corporation
- 2023 Rodney E. Slater, former United States Secretary of Transportation
- 2024 Gary C. Kelly, former chairman and chief executive officer of Southwest Airlines

== See also ==
- List of aviation awards
