= GO Voyages =

- Company type: Subsidiary
- Industry: Online travel agency
- Founded: 1997
- Founders: Carlos Da Silva; Nicolas Brumelot
- Headquarters: Paris, France
- Products: Flights, hotels, holiday packages, car rental, travel insurance
- Parent: eDreams ODIGEO
- Website: www.govoyages.com

GO Voyages is a French online travel brand of eDreams ODIGEO, a travel subscription platform headquartered in Barcelona, Spain.

== History ==
GO Voyages was established in 1997 as an online flight-booking company. In March 2007 it was acquired by Financière Agache. In 2011, GO Voyages merged with eDreams and jointly acquired Opodo to create eDreams ODIGEO, a European group backed by Axa Private Equity and Permira. In April 2014, eDreams ODIGEO held an initial public offering on the Bolsa de Madrid.

== Operations ==
GO Voyages focus on flights, rail, hotels, dynamic flight and hotel packages, car rental, and travel insurance. The subscription programme provides members with discounted fares on flights, hotels, travel packages and car rentals, and additional travel benefits.

== Regulatory and consumer-protection actions ==
GO Voyages and other brands within the eDreams ODIGEO group have been the subject of regulatory and consumer-protection actions in several jurisdictions. Go Voyages was fined in 2024 in Portugal for 2 mln euros for not disclosing the hidden fees. References
