= Twohill =

Twohill is a surname. Notable people with the surname include:

- David Twohill (born 1954), Australian musician
- Lorraine Twohill, Irish marketer
- Pat Twohill (1915–1989), New Zealand actor and radio announcer
