= Javier Perez-Tenessa =

Javier Pérez-Tenessa de Block
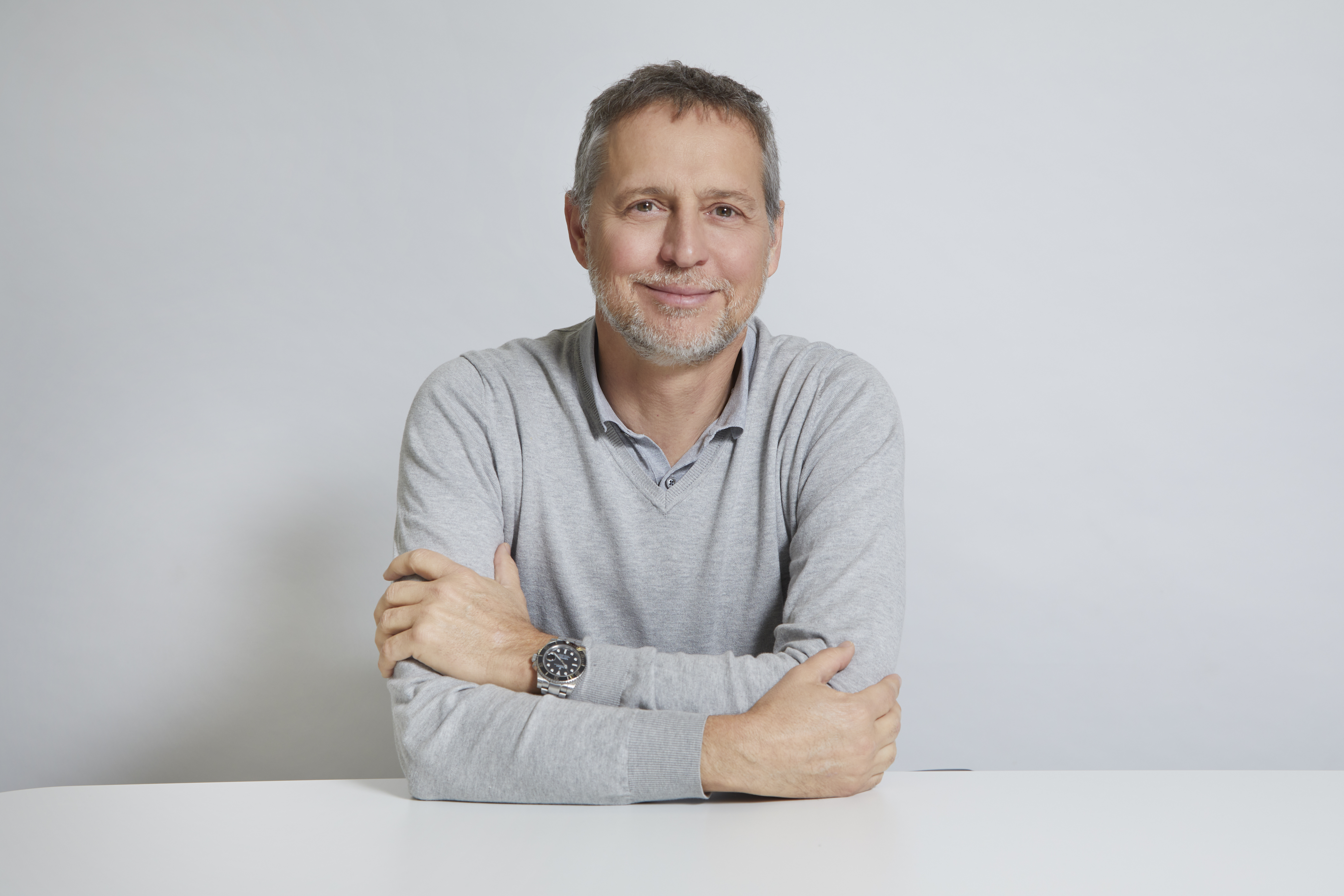
- Javier Perez-Tenessa in 2021
- Born: June 1967 (age 59); Mexico City, Mexico
- Education: Stanford University MBA 1997, Polytechnic University of Madrid, MS Aerospace Engineering 1990
- Alma mater: Stanford University
- Occupations: Investor, Entrepreneur, Musician
- Known for: Founder of eDreams

Javier Pérez-Tenessa is a Mexican entrepreneur, businessman, investor, and producer based in Barcelona, Spain, who has founded several companies, including publicly traded eDreams and Venture Capital firm 4Founders Capital.

== Early life and education ==
Pérez-Tenessa was born in Mexico, and moved to Spain aged 10. He graduated from the French Lycée in Madrid in 1984. He then became a student in the Polytechnic University of Madrid, and graduated after six years with an MS in aerospace engineering ("ingeniero superior aeronáutico"), from the School of Aerospace Engineering, where he was the top graduating student in his class. For this he received the "Francisco Arranz" price of the "colegio español de ingenieros aeronáuticos".

In 1995 he attended the Stanford Graduate School of Business, where he earned his MBA in 1997.

== Career ==
Pérez-Tenessa started his career designing satellites in France with Aérospatiale and working on Jet Engine Turbines at Pratt and Whitney in the United States. He joined McKinsey and Company in 1993. After two years with the firm, he moved to Silicon Valley to pursue his MBA and in 1996 he joined Netscape, the company which created the first massively popular web browser.

He founded eDreams in 1999 in the Valley but quickly moved operations and focus to Europe. He was CEO of eDreams and of its successor eDreams ODIGEO from 1999 to 2015.

During his tenure as CEO, he led the company through five private equity transactions, several private and public debt issuances, three acquisitions and an IPO, which he completed in April 2014, and valued the company at €1.5 billion at the time. eDreams is the only internet startup in Spain to have been listed publicly in the main market. It was also the first Internet Unicorn in the country. In 2015, Perez-Tenessa resigned from his role as CEO and Chairman of eDreams, and remained as its Honorary Chairman.

In 2017 he co-founded SeedRocket 4Founders, a venture capital firm investing in early stage technology companies. He is an investor both personally and through 4Founders in a large number of technology companies around the world.

In 2019 the Universidad Poliltécnica de Madrid awards him the ActúaUPM 2019 Honorary Award for his "career, ability to excel (...), which serve as an example for all those entrepreneurs who present themselves each year to the actuaupm Competition" In 2025 Forbes includes him in "the 50 dream list and the man behind it".

In 2022, Perez-Tenessa joined the Board of NGO Barcelona GLobal

He has been in the board of several companies including those in the eDreams Group, Vueling airlines and Lastminute.com Group.

in October 2025, Perez-Tenessa invested in Tradeinn, a leading e-commerce player in Europe, and became chairman of the board.

== Music ==
Perez-Tenessa has produced a number of musical theater plays, notably the Spanish productions of Rent in 2016, and Fun Home in 2018. He has composed several pieces which are available to the public in SoundCloud. He has performed both the bass and tenor voices in the Choir for Handel's Messiah at the Palau de La Musica in Barcelona.
