= 5756 Wassenbergh =

Main-belt asteroid

Discovery
- Discovered by: C. J. van Houten; I. van Houten-G. T. Gehrels
- Discovery site: Palomar Obs.
- Discovery date: 24 September 1960

Designations
- Named after: Henri Wassenbergh (Dutch professor of law)
- Alternative designations: 6034 P-L · 1985 TG_{1}
- Minor planet category: main-belt · (middle); Rafita

Orbital characteristics
- Epoch 23 March 2018 (JD 2458200.5)
- Uncertainty parameter 0
- Observation arc: 57.59 yr (21,033 d)
- Aphelion: 3.1634 AU
- Perihelion: 2.0018 AU
- Semi-major axis: 2.5826 AU
- Eccentricity: 0.2249
- Orbital period (sidereal): 4.15 yr (1,516 d)
- Mean anomaly: 319.93°
- Mean motion: 0° 14^{m} 15^{s} / day
- Inclination: 7.6000°
- Longitude of ascending node: 198.00°
- Argument of perihelion: 144.05°

Physical characteristics
- Mean diameter: 3.930±0.134 km
- Geometric albedo: 0.262±0.057
- Spectral type: L (SDSS-MOC)
- Absolute magnitude (H): 14.1

5756 Wassenbergh, provisional designation 6034 P-L, is a Rafita asteroid from the central regions of the asteroid belt, approximately 4 kilometers (2.5 miles) in diameter. It was discovered on 24 September 1960, by Dutch astronomer couple Ingrid and Cornelis van Houten on photographic plates taken by Dutch–American astronomer Tom Gehrels at the Palomar Observatory in California, United States. The asteroid was named after Dutch professor of law, Henri Wassenbergh.

== Orbit and classification ==
Wassenbergh is a member of the Rafita family (518), a large family of stony asteroid, named after 1644 Rafita. It orbits the Sun in the central asteroid belt at a distance of 2.0–3.2 AU once every 4 years and 2 months (1,516 days; semi-major axis of 2.58 AU). Its orbit has an eccentricity of 0.22 and an inclination of 8° with respect to the ecliptic. The body's observation arc begins with its official discovery observation at Palomar in 1960.

=== Palomar–Leiden survey ===
The survey designation "P-L" stands for "Palomar–Leiden", named after Palomar and Leiden observatories, which collaborated on the fruitful Palomar–Leiden survey in the 1960s. Tom Gehrels used Palomar's Samuel Oschin telescope (also known as the 48-inch Schmidt Telescope), and shipped the photographic plates to Ingrid and Cornelis van Houten at Leiden Observatory where astrometry was carried out. The trio are credited with the discovery of several thousand asteroid discoveries.

== Physical characteristics ==
Wassenbergh has been characterized as an L-type asteroid by the SDSS-taxonomy based on the Moving Object Catalog (MOC). The Rafita family's overall spectral type is that of a stony S-type. The asteroid has an absolute magnitude of 14.1. As of 2018, no rotational lightcurve has been obtained from photometric observations. The body's rotation period, pole and shape remain unknown.

=== Diameter and albedo ===
According to the survey carried out by the NEOWISE mission of NASA's Wide-field Infrared Survey Explorer, Wassenbergh measures 3.930 kilometers in diameter and its surface has an albedo of 0.262.

== Naming ==
This minor planet was named after Henri Wassenbergh (1924–2014), who was Professor of Air and Space Law at University of Leiden in the Netherlands from 1977 through 1994. The name was suggested by Prof. Wassenbergh's secretary and his colleagues at Leiden. The official naming citation was published by the Minor Planet Center on 19 October 1994 (M.P.C. 24123). The naming was timed to coincide with his valedictory address at the university.

He had been Professor Extraordinarius of Air and Space Law at Leiden since 1977, and Professor Ordinarius since 1991. Wassenbergh, known to his friends and colleagues as "Or" Wassenbergh, is a Dutch academic and for many years, he was an official of Royal Dutch Airlines (KLM). Since 1967, he had been a member of the Air Transport Commission of the International Chamber of Commerce in Paris. Wassenbergh also participated in the European Centre for Space Law (ECSL) of the European Space Agency (ESA), the International Institute of Space Law of the International Astronautical Federation, the International Air Transport Association (IATA) Air Policy Advisory Group, the Société Française de Droit Aérien, the Netherlands branch of the Legal Committee of the International Civil Aviation Organization, and the Netherlands Interdepartmental Committee on Civil Aviation. In this context, the title of one of his books seems prescient -- Principles of Outer Space Law in Hindsight.
