= Thomas C. Richards =

United States Air Force general (1930–2020)

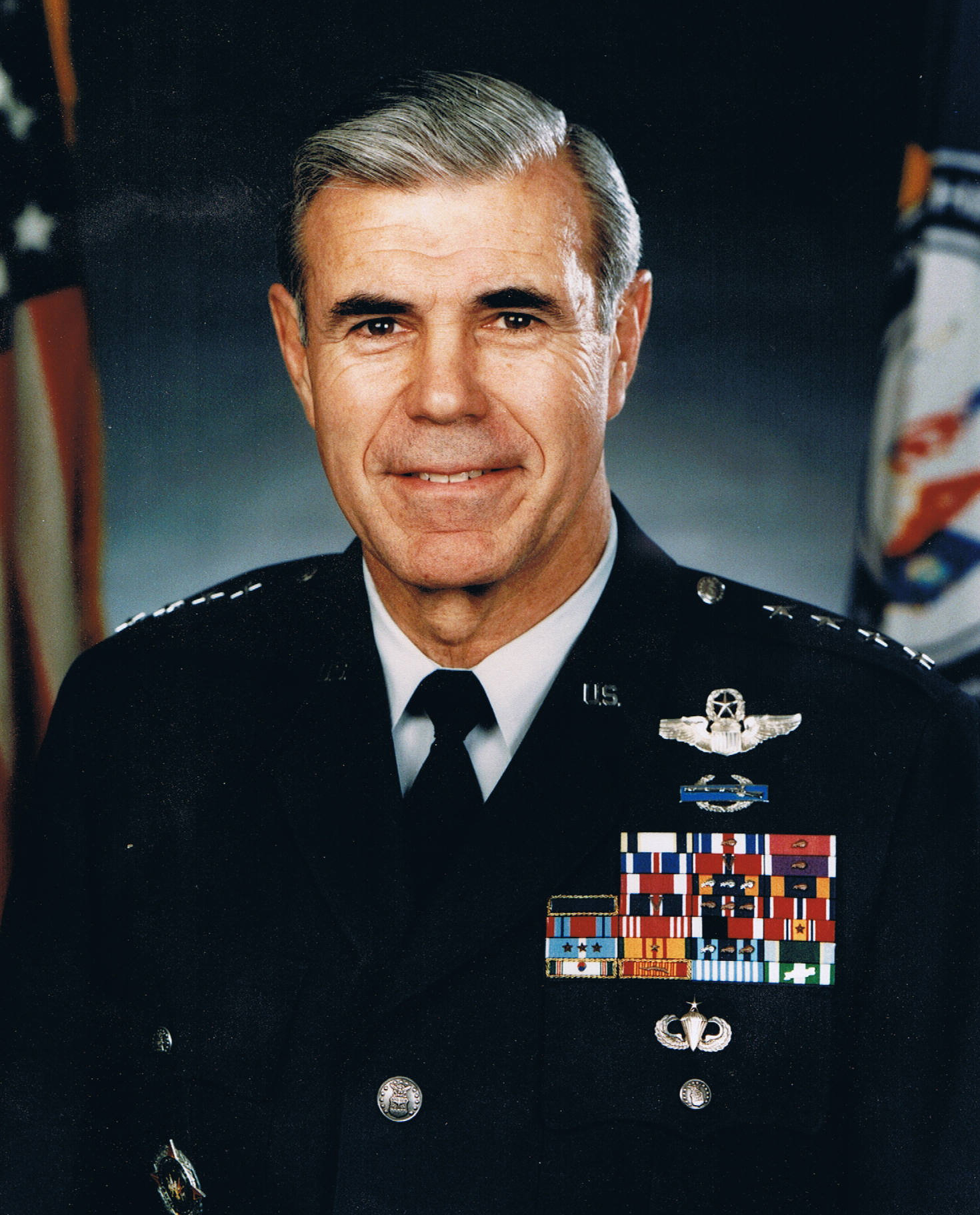
- Born: February 13, 1930; San Diego, California, U.S.
- Died: August 9, 2020 (aged 90); San Antonio, Texas, U.S.
- Military career
- Allegiance: United States
- Branch: United States Air Force
- Service years: 1948–1989
- Rank: General
- Commands: Raven Forward Air Controllers; Basic Military Training School; Air Reserve Personnel Center; Air Force Recruiting Service; Keesler Technical Training Center; Air University; Deputy Commander United States European Command
- Conflicts: Cold War; Korean War; Vietnam War

Thomas Carl Richards (February 13, 1930 – August 9, 2020) was a general in the United States Air Force, the former chief of staff of the Supreme Headquarters Allied Powers Europe, and 12th Administrator of the Federal Aviation Administration.

== Biography ==
=== Early life ===
Richards was born on February 13, 1930, in San Diego, California. He graduated from Hampton High School, Virginia, in 1948.

His military career began with the United States Army infantry in 1948. He served as a platoon sergeant during the Korean War and was wounded twice. He received a commission as a distinguished graduate of the Air Force Reserve Officer Training Corps program at Virginia Polytechnic Institute in 1956, where he earned a bachelor of science degree in business administration. Richards entered pilot training and earned his wings at Goodfellow Air Force Base, Texas, in 1957. After combat crew training, he was assigned as a B-47 Stratojet co-pilot with the Strategic Air Command's 19th Bombardment Wing, Homestead Air Force Base, Florida, from December 1958 to February 1961.

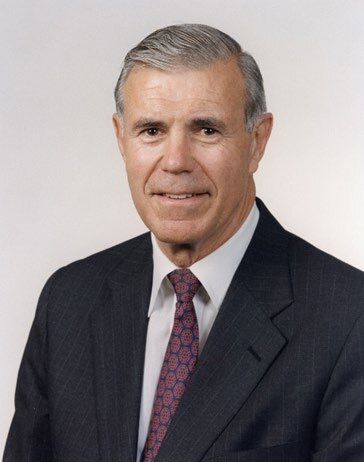
Richards pictured as FAA administrator

He was upgraded to B-47E Stratojet commander at Little Rock Air Force Base, Arkansas, before being transferred, in July 1961, to the 301st Bombardment Wing at Lockbourne Air Force Base, Ohio. He completed Squadron Officer School in 1963 and received B-52 Stratofortress combat crew training at Castle Air Force Base, California, from May to August 1964. His next assignments were to the 20th Bombardment Squadron at Barksdale Air Force Base, Louisiana, and later to Carswell Air Force Base, Texas. During this period, he was an aircraft commander on the first B-52 combat missions over Vietnam.

=== Later career ===
After completing tactical combat crew training and airborne training in October 1966, Richards was assigned to the 19th Tactical Air Support Squadron at Bien Hoa Air Base, Republic of Vietnam, as a forward air controller with the 101st Airborne Division. He served a consecutive tour of duty with the 56th Air Commando Wing at Udorn Royal Thai Air Force Base, Thailand, with detached service at the U.S. Embassy, Vientiane Laos. In addition, he commanded the Raven Forward Air Controllers and flew 624 combat missions in O-1 Bird Dogs, T-28 Trojans, U-10D Super Couriers and U-17 Skywagons.

In January 1969, he returned to the United States and was assigned to the United States Air Force Academy, Colorado, where he served as an executive officer, squadron air officer commanding and group air officer commanding until May 1972. He then attended the Army War College, graduating in 1973.

He transferred to Lackland Air Force Base, Texas, in June 1973 as wing deputy commander, and then served as commander of the Basic Military Training School. That same year, he received a master's degree in communication from Shippensburg State College. In July 1975, he was assigned to the Directorate of Personnel Plans, Office of the Deputy Chief of Staff for Personnel, Headquarters United States Air Force, Washington, D.C., as chief of the Motivation and Communications Branch and, later, became chief of the Leadership and Motivation Division.

From November 1976 to December 1977, Richards served as commander of the Air Reserve Personnel Center at Denver. He then returned to the academy as vice commandant of cadets and became commandant of cadets in March 1978. General Richards assumed command of the Air Force Recruiting Service at Randolph Air Force Base, Texas, in February 1981. In March 1982, Richards transferred to Keesler Air Force Base, Mississippi, as commander of the Keesler Technical Training Center. From September 1983 to July 1984, he was assigned as Commander, 8th Air Force, Barksdale Air Force Base, Louisiana. He then became commander of the Air University, Maxwell Air Force Base, Alabama. He assumed that position in November 1986.

He was promoted to general on December 1, 1986, with same date of rank. He retired on September 30, 1989. After his retirement, he was appointed as the administrator of the Federal Aviation Administration in June 1993; he resigned in January 1994 in response to the change in Presidential administration (from Bush Sr. to Clinton). Richards died on August 9, 2020, in San Antonio, Texas.

== Awards ==
Awards earned during his career:

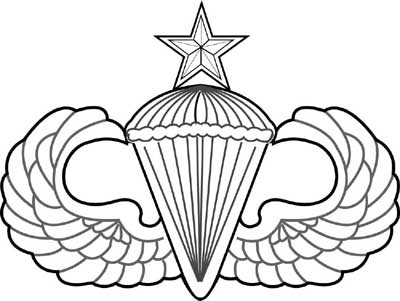
US Air Force Command Pilot Badge
Combat Infantryman Badge
Senior Parachutist Badge
United States European Command Badge

Air Force Distinguished Service Medal
Silver Star with one bronze oak leaf cluster
Legion of Merit with oak leaf cluster
Distinguished Flying Cross
Bronze Star Medal with "V" device
Purple Heart with oak leaf cluster
Meritorious Service Medal
Air Medal with fifteen oak leaf clusters
Air Medal with oak leaf cluster
Air Force Presidential Unit Citation
Air Force Outstanding Unit Award with Valor device
Air Force Outstanding Unit Award with three oak leaf clusters
Air Force Organizational Excellence Award
Combat Readiness Medal
Army Good Conduct Medal
Army of Occupation Medal
National Defense Service Medal with one bronze service star
Korean Service Medal with three service stars
Vietnam Service Medal with service star
Air Force Longevity Service Award with silver and three bronze oak leaf clusters
Air Force Longevity Service Award (second ribbon to denote tenth award)
Small Arms Expert Marksmanship Ribbon
Republic of Korea Presidential Unit Citation
Vietnam Gallantry Cross Unit Citation
United Nations Korea Medal
Vietnam Campaign Medal

- Richards has got more than 4,700 flying hours.

== Effective dates of promotions ==
Rank	Date
Second Lieutenant	June 10, 1956
First Lieutenant	February 25, 1958
Captain	October 1, 1962
Major	June 20, 1967
Lieutenant Colonel	December 1, 1970
Colonel	April 1, 1974
Brigadier General	November 1, 1978
Major General	June 15, 1982
Lieutenant General	August 1, 1984
General	December 1, 1986

Government offices
Preceded by James B. Busey IV	Administrator of the Federal Aviation Administration; 1992–1993	Succeeded by David R. Hinson
