= James E. Hughes Jr. =

- Other name: Jay Hughes
- Education: Pingry School; Princeton University (BA, 1964); Columbia Law School (1967)
- Occupations: Lawyer, author
- Employer(s): Coudert Brothers; Jones Day
- Known for: Family Wealth: Keeping It in the Family; Five capitals framework of family wealth
- Awards: Family Wealth Report Lifetime Achievement Award (2017)

James E. Hughes Jr., also known as Jay Hughes, is an American lawyer and author whose work focuses on family governance, wealth preservation, trusts, and the transfer of wealth between generations. He practised as a private-client lawyer and was a partner at the international law firms Coudert Brothers and Jones Day before retiring from active legal practice.

He is the author of Family Wealth: Keeping It in the Family, first published in 1997 and later issued in a revised edition by Bloomberg Press, and Family: The Compact Among Generations. He has also co-authored several books on family wealth, intergenerational wealth transfer, and trusts, including The Cycle of the Gift, The Voice of the Rising Generation, Family Trusts, Complete Family Wealth, Family Flourishing: The True Meaning of Wealth.

== Early life and education ==
Hughes attended the Far Brook School and the Pingry School in New Jersey. He graduated from Princeton University in 1964 with a degree in history and from Columbia Law School in 1967.

== Career ==
=== Legal career ===
Hughes began his professional career as a lawyer working with private clients. He founded a law partnership in New York City that specialized in representing individuals and families.

He later became a partner at Coudert Brothers, an international law firm headquartered in New York, and later at Jones Day. He later retired from the active practice of law and continued his work as an adviser to families and family offices.

His advisory work has concentrated on family governance, the responsibilities of beneficiaries and trustees, intergenerational relationships, and the non-financial dimensions of family wealth.

=== Writing ===
Hughes privately published Family Wealth: Keeping It in the Family in 1997. A revised and expanded edition was subsequently published by Bloomberg Press. The book examines the tendency for family fortunes to diminish over successive generations, often expressed through the proverb "shirtsleeves to shirtsleeves in three generations". Hughes argued that the preservation of family wealth depends not only on investment performance but also on the development of family members and institutions. Hughes described human and intellectual capital as important components of a family's wealth and advocated practices intended to develop those resources across generations. The 2004 edition was reviewed by Laurent Roux in Family Business Review.

Writing in Philanthropy, Keith Whitaker described the first edition as having become "something of a cult classic among some estate planners and their clients."

Hughes expanded his discussion of intergenerational family relationships in Family: The Compact Among Generations, published by Bloomberg Press in 2007. The book examines the governance of families over long periods and the roles played by different generations, advisers and family institutions.

His writings have also addressed the concept of family elders, decision-making within families, the role of advisers, and the relationship between wealth and individual well-being. In a 2023 interview with Family Wealth Report, Hughes discussed the role of advisers and elders in family decision-making and described wealth in terms of well-being rather than financial assets alone.

Hughes has written several books with Susan E. Massenzio and Keith Whitaker. Their first collaborative volume, The Cycle of the Gift: Family Wealth and Wisdom, was published in 2013. It examines the transfer of financial assets between generations and the relationship between donors and recipients.

The three authors followed it with The Voice of the Rising Generation: Family Wealth and Wisdom in 2014. The book focuses on younger members of families with inherited wealth and their participation in family decision-making.

Hughes also collaborated with Hartley Goldstone and Whitaker on Family Trusts: A Guide for Beneficiaries, Trustees, Trust Protectors, and Trust Creators, published in 2015. The book discusses trusts from the perspectives of trustees and beneficiaries and considers the responsibilities associated with being a beneficiary.

Hughes, Massenzio and Whitaker later published Complete Family Wealth, which brought together themes from their earlier writings concerning family governance and different forms of family capital.

In 2025, Business Insider described Hughes as a pioneer of family wealth advising who is regarded as "the father of modern family governance", and summarised his framework of five forms of family capital—human, intellectual, social, spiritual, and financial capital—in which financial capital exists to support the other four.

== Recognition ==
Hughes received the Lifetime Achievement award at the 2017 Family Wealth Report Awards in New York. He is a fellow of the Family Firm Institute and a founding member of the Collaboration for Family Flourishing.

The James E. Hughes Jr. Foundation, a Colorado non-profit established in 2021, is named for him and publishes material on family wealth and governance.

== Selected bibliography ==
- Family Wealth: Keeping It in the Family. Privately published, 1997. ISBN 978-0-9663915-0-3. Revised and expanded edition: Bloomberg Press, 2004. ISBN 978-1-57660-151-8.
- Family: The Compact Among Generations. Bloomberg Press, 2007. ISBN 978-1-57660-024-5.
- The Cycle of the Gift: Family Wealth and Wisdom (with Susan E. Massenzio and Keith Whitaker). Bloomberg Press/Wiley, 2012. ISBN 978-1-118-48759-4.
- The Voice of the Rising Generation: Family Wealth and Wisdom (with Susan E. Massenzio and Keith Whitaker). Bloomberg Press/Wiley, 2014. ISBN 978-1-118-93651-1.
- Family Trusts: A Guide for Beneficiaries, Trustees, Trust Protectors, and Trust Creators (with Hartley Goldstone and Keith Whitaker). Bloomberg Press/Wiley, 2015. ISBN 978-1-119-11826-8.
- Complete Family Wealth (with Susan E. Massenzio and Keith Whitaker). Bloomberg Press/Wiley, 2017. ISBN 978-1-119-45321-5. 2nd ed. as Complete Family Wealth: Wealth as Well-Being, 2022. ISBN 978-1-119-82003-1.
- Family Flourishing: The True Meaning of Wealth (with Mary K. Duke and Stacy L. Allred). James E. Hughes Jr. Publishing, 2026. ISBN 979-8-9510689-9-6.
