= Giovanni Bisignani =

Italian businessman

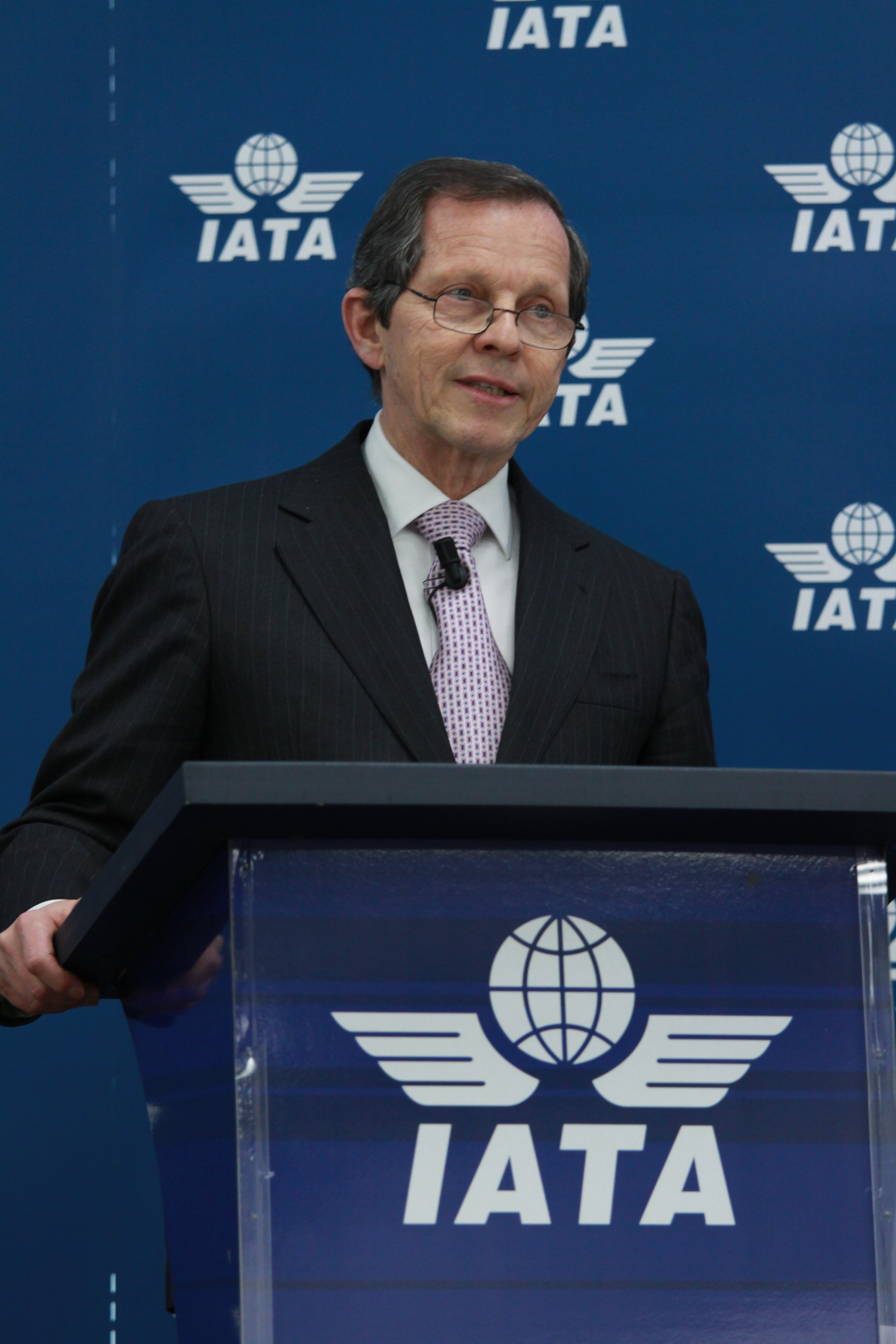
Giovanni Bisignani

Giovanni Bisignani (born 1946) is an Italian businessman, who was Director General and Chief Executive Officer of the International Air Transport Association from 2002 to 2011.

== Education ==
Bisignani was born in Rome, and received an undergraduate degree from the Sapienza University of Rome. He later studied as a graduate student at Harvard Business School.

== Career ==
Bisignani has managerial and business advisory experience, mostly in the transportation field, including:

- ENI, a European energy company
- Istituto per la Ricostruzione Industriale, an Italian industrial group
- Tirrenia di Navigazione, Italy's largest ferry company (President)
- SM Logistics, a group of companies involved in logistics and freight forwarding (CEO)
- Alitalia, Italy's largest airline company (CEO and Managing Director)
- IATA's Board of Governors (member)
- Association of European Airlines (Chairman)
- Pratt & Whitney Advisory Board (member)
- National Air Traffic Services Advisory Board (member).
- Opodo, Online Travel Portal (CEO)

Bisignani was Director General and CEO of IATA from 2002 to 2011. He was succeeded by Tony Tyler, who joined IATA from Cathay Pacific Airways where he was the CEO.

== Publications ==
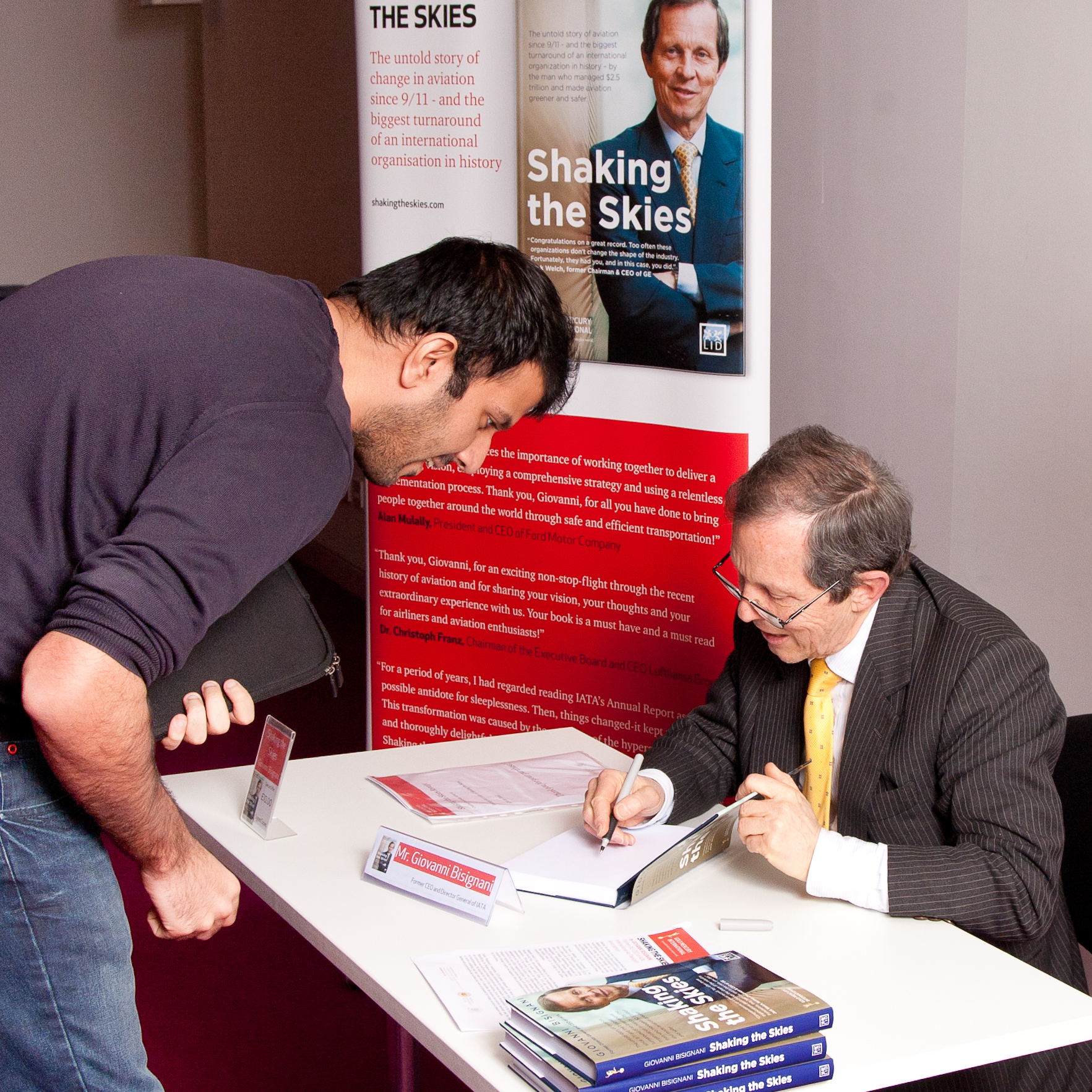
Giovanni Bisignani presents his book "Shaking the Skies"

After retiring from IATA, Bisignani published Shaking the Skies, a book covering his experience there, focussing on leadership issues, governance and the role of executives in executing a strategic vision for their industry

== Policies ==
Since 2002, Bisignani has led a number of initiatives reshaping air transport:

- Safety: the IATA Operational Safety Audit is an internationally recognized and accepted evaluation system designed to assess the operational management and control systems of an airline.
- Environment: while air transport’s contribution to climate change is limited to 2% of global carbon emissions Bisignani is driving the industry to achieve carbon neutral growth by 2020 and to cut aviation’s carbon emissions by half in 2050. www.iata.org/environment
- Simplifying the Business (Stb): Bisignani initiated this program using technology to improve customer convenience and reduce costs in 2004. In 2008, 100% e-ticketing was achieved throughout the industry. The StB project is now targeting industry savings of $17 billion with initiatives ranging from bar coded boarding passes to Fast Travel, Baggage Improvement Program and e-freight.

== Personal life ==
Born in Rome in 1946, Bisignani speaks Italian, English, and Spanish. He is married with one daughter and enjoys golf, tennis and riding. Giovanni Bisignani is the brother of Luigi, Italian businessman and professional journalist which was closely friend of Andreotti, and for 20 years worked for ANSA, the national centralized Agency Press.

== Awards ==
- Honorary Doctorate from Cranfield University, UK in 2008, for his work in the air transport industry.
- L. Welch Pogue Award for Lifetime Achievement in Aviation, 2011.
- ATW's 2012 Airline Industry - Decade of Excellence Award
