= Chaka Patterson =

American attorney (born 1968)

Chaka M. Patterson
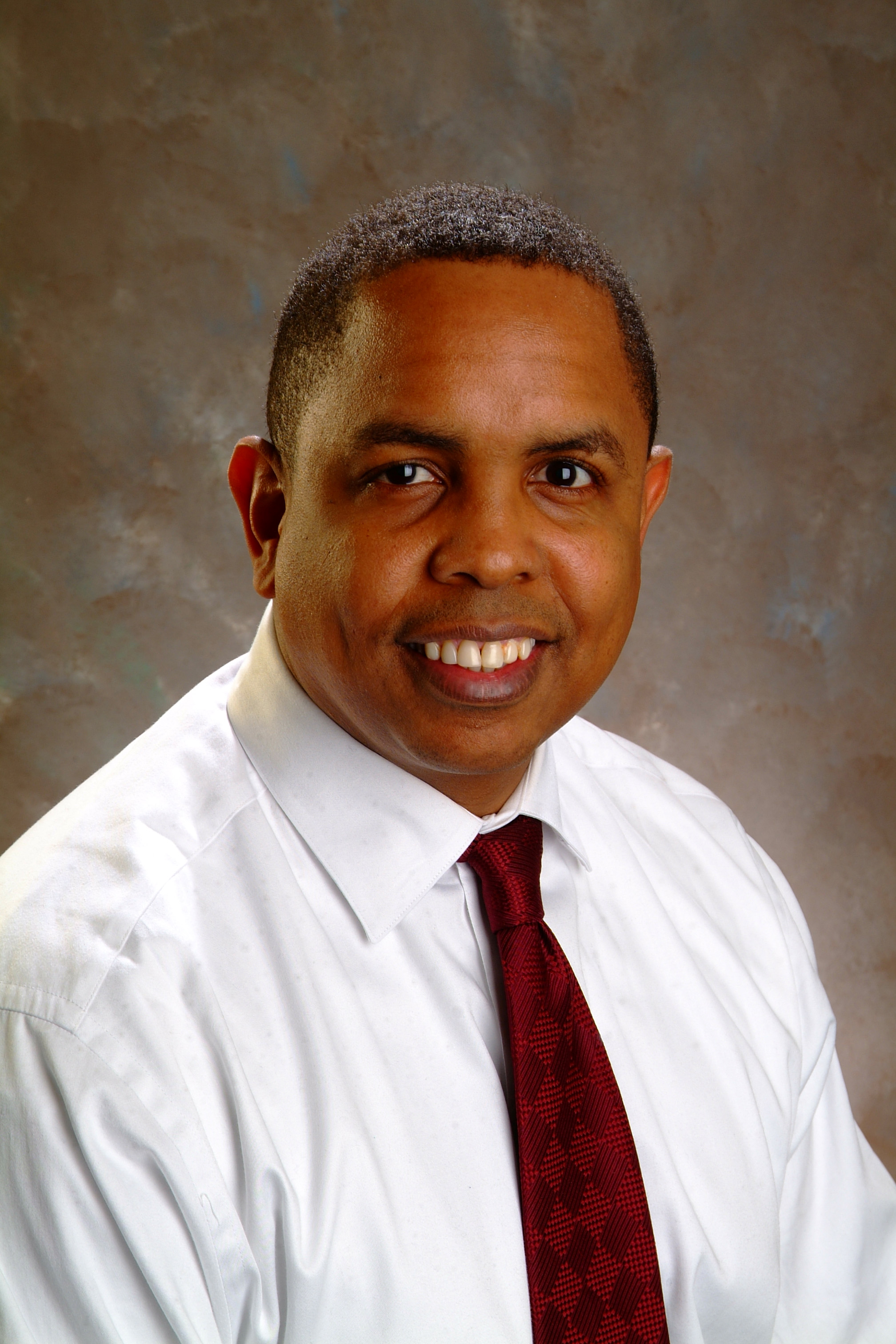
- Born: November 27, 1968 (age 56); New York City, U.S.
- Education: Amherst College (BA); Harvard Law School (JD); University of Chicago Booth School of Business (MBA)
- Occupation: Attorney

Chaka M. Patterson (born November 27, 1968) is an American attorney. He is currently a partner at Alston & Bird in its San Francisco office with a practice that focuses on litigation, investigations, and corporate governance. Patterson previously served as Senior Vice President, General Counsel & Corporate Secretary of Adtalem Global Education, Inc. (NYSE: ATGE). Chaka joined ATGE in June 2018 as Vice President & General Counsel. He held that position until his promotion to General Counsel in February 2020. Chaka was one of the top fundraisers for US President Barack Obama. He is also a fundraiser for Hillary Clinton. He also served on the national finance committee for President Obama's 2012 presidential campaign.

== Early life and education ==
Patterson was born on November 27, 1968, in New York City. He attended Amherst College, where he received a Bachelor of Arts degree in Political Science, graduating magna cum laude in 1990. While there, he served as president of the Student Government Organization, while also serving a staff writer for the Amherst student newspaper. He then went on to attend Harvard Law School, where he received a Juris Doctor in 1994. He earned his MBA from the University of Chicago Booth School of Business in 2017. He is married to Tracey Patterson, a managing director at Accenture.

== Professional background ==
Following Patterson's graduation from law school in 1994, he served as a law clerk to the Honorable Solomon Oliver, Jr. at the United States District Court, Northern District of Ohio, in Cleveland. From 1997 to 1998, Patterson worked for the United States Court of Appeals for the Sixth Circuit in Cleveland, where he served as a law clerk to the Honorable Karen Nelson Moore. From 2002 to 2003, Patterson was a partner at Jenner & Block, in Chicago. He then went on to work at the Office of the Illinois Attorney General as an assistant attorney general and chief of the Special Litigation Bureau, remaining there to 2006.

In 2006, Patterson served on staff at Exelon Corporation, where he served as vice president and treasurer; vice president of investor relations; and associate general counsel of litigation. In 2013, Patterson joined the law firm of Jones Day, one of the largest law firms in the world. As partner, he focused his practice on representing clients in business and commercial litigation and State Attorneys General investigations and litigation, defending clients in False Claims Act litigation, and assisting management and directors with internal investigations and compliance issues. Patterson left Jones Day in February 2017 to become the Chief of the Civil Actions Bureau in the Cook County State's Attorney's Office. Patterson then joined Adtalem Global Education as Vice President & Deputy General Counsel in June 2018 and was promoted to Senior Vice President, General Counsel & Corporate Secretary in February 2020.

== Professional memberships and associations ==
- Board Member, University of Chicago Laboratory Schools, Chicago, Illinois
- Council Member, University of Chicago Law School, Chicago, Illinois
- Board Member, Ann and Robert Lurie Children's Hospital, Chicago, Illinois
- Board Member, Chicago Public Library, Chicago, Illinois
- Faculty Member, National Institute for Trial Advocacy

== Honors and awards ==
- "Top 40 Lawyers Under 40," Illinois Law Bulletin (2003)
- Diversity Action Award, National Association of Regulatory Utility Commissioners (2009)
- Dr. Arthur Fletcher Outstanding Leadership Award, Illinois Black Chamber of Commerce (2010)
- Harvard Law Society Role Model Award (2011)
