= David R. Hinson =

American businessman (1933–2023)

David Hinson
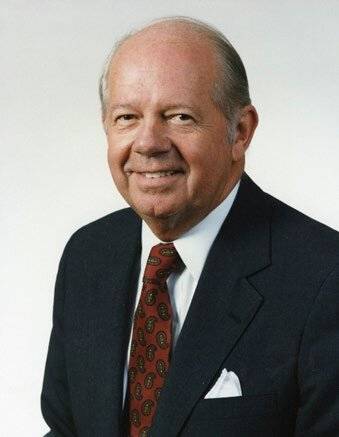

13th Administrator of the Federal Aviation Administration
- In office August 10, 1993
- Preceded by: Thomas C. Richards
- Succeeded by: Jane Garvey

Personal details
- Born: March 2, 1933 Muskogee, Oklahoma, U.S.
- Died: December 3, 2023 (aged 90)
- Education: University of Washington
- Occupation: Former Public Servant, Administrator of the Federal Aviation Administration (FAA), pilot, airline executive

David Russell Hinson (March 2, 1933 – December 3, 2023) was an American aircraft pilot, head of Midway Airlines, and administrator of the Federal Aviation Administration.

Hinson served as Administrator of the Federal Aviation Administration (FAA) as an appointee of President Bill Clinton. He oversaw the government's response to the ValuJet Flight 592 crash on May 11, 1996, in the Florida Everglades, for which he received heavy criticism. A column in the Chicago Tribune called for Hinson to be fired by President Clinton. According to the NTSB, the airline had improperly transported cabin chemical-oxygen generators in the cargo hold, which started a fire on board when the initiation pins were jostled and the oxygen generators began to flow. The chemical reaction inside the metal canisters created tremendous heat, ignited tires adjacent to the canisters, and the oxygen fed the fire. The cabin filled with smoke and fire from the cargo hold area.

A graduate of the University of Washington with a B. A. degree, Hinson had been involved with flying since 1954, when he entered flight school with the Navy. In 1961 after a 10-year career in the military in active and reserve status, Hinson flew as a pilot for Northwest Airlines and as an instructor pilot for United Air Lines. He joined West Coast Airlines, renamed Hughes Airwest, for 10 years as captain and as director of Flight Standards and Engineering.

In 1973, Hinson moved to Hinson-Minella, Inc., a limited partnership with investments including Flightcraft, Inc., a distributorship for Beech Aircraft in the Pacific Northwest. In 1978, Hinson joined with three people to start Midway Airlines, which he served as chairman for six years (1985–91). While working as the executive vice president for Douglas Aircraft, a subsidiary of McDonnell Douglas, President Clinton appointed him to head the FAA.

Hinson served on boards at the National Air and Space Museum and the Aircraft Owners and Pilots Association.

Government offices
Preceded by Thomas C. Richards	Federal Aviation Administrator; 1993–1996	Succeeded by Jane Garvey
