= David Scowsill =

Former President and CEO of World Travel and Tourism Council

David P. Scowsill
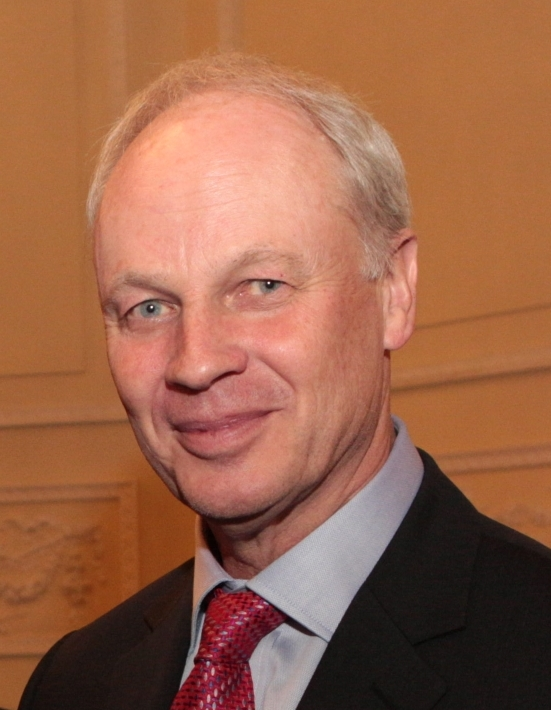
- Education: University of Southampton
- Occupations: Businessman, Chairman & Non-Executive Director
- Known for: WTTC, Opodo, Hilton Worldwide, British Airways, American Airlines, PrivateFly

David P. Scowsill is a British businessman, and serial non-executive director and chairman, known for his contributions to the travel and tourism industries. He is the former president and CEO of the World Travel & Tourism Council.

== Early life and education ==
Scowsill was born in Great Britain and was educated at Stowe School in Buckingham, and later graduated from the University of Southampton with an Honors Degree in Spanish and Latin American studies.

== Professional career ==
Scowsill joined British Airways after university working in various operational and sales positions worldwide. In 1991, he left British Airways to join American Airlines as managing director of sales and marketing for Europe, Middle East, and Africa. In 1993, Scowsill returned to British Airways as regional general manager for Asia and the Pacific and as director for Europe and the Middle East. He played a key role in forming the first global airline alliance with Qantas. His joint service arrangement between the two airlines later became the model for many other aviation joint ventures.

In 1997, he joined Hilton International's board of directors. In 1999, he became the CEO of Minit Group, after which in 2001 he joined Orange communications as a managing director of the consumer division. In 2002, Scowsill was appointed CEO of Opodo, the online travel agency founded by a consortium of European airlines. Scowsill grew the company from startup until Amadeus bought Opodo in 2004.

Scowsill then worked in private equity and venture capital, dealing with startup investment and completing deals in the technology and travel sectors. His focus on travel deals resulted in Scowsill becoming member of Worldhotels's supervisory board which was formed in 2005. After that, Scowsill held a Chairman position at YuuGuu, and served as non-executive director at Venere.com and On The Beach Holidays. He has been interim Sales and marketing director at easyJet airlines, Group Marketing Director at Manchester Airports Group. He then became Chairman of PrivateFly, a jet charter company, securing the first phase of funding for the business in 2010.

== Travel industry and government advocacy ==
In November 2010, Scowsill was appointed president and CEO of the World Travel & Tourism Council, the global authority and research group on travel and tourism economic and social contribution.

As part of his role was the partnership with UNWTO and the Open Letter on Travel and Tourism that produced 84 meetings with Presidents and Prime Ministers including Bill Clinton, King Abdullah of Jordan, Yoshihiko Noda of Japan, President Zuma, Michelle Bachelet, José Manuel Durao Barroso, Anibal Cavaco Silva, and Jose Manuel Soria. He was also a founder and chairman of The Global Travel Association Coalition.

He was a regular spokesperson for global findings and growth statistics on travel and tourism at conferences and global summits till his departing from WTTC in 2017.

He has also been one of the main voices in the media regarding terrorism, disasters and the tourism industry.
