= Lorraine Twohill =

Irish marketer, CMO of Google

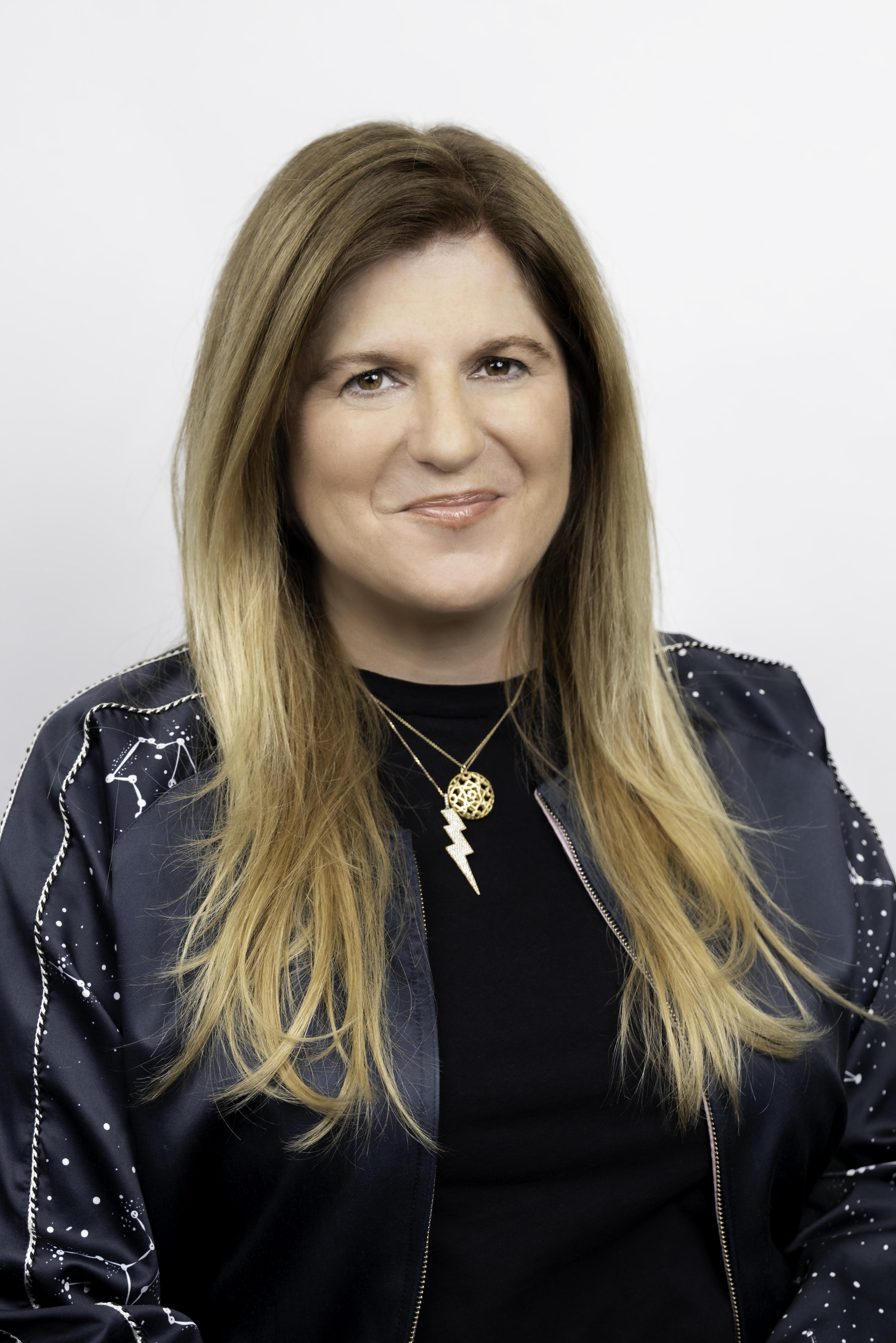
- Born: 1971; Carlow, Ireland
- Education: Dublin City University
- Occupation: CMO of Google
- Employer: Google
- Board member of: Palo Alto Networks

Lorraine Twohill is an Irish business executive, based in the U.S. state of California. She is the chief marketing officer of Google and has been a board member of Palo Alto Networks, Williams-Sonoma, Inc., and Telegraph Media Group. Prior to joining Google in 2003, she worked for Burns Philp, the Government of Ireland's Bord Fáilte, and Opodo.

== Early life ==
Twohill was born in Carlow, Ireland. She gained a degree in international marketing and languages from Dublin City University in 1992.

== Career ==
After graduating, Twohill worked for Burns Philp during the 1990s. She left the company to join the Government of Ireland's Bord Fáilte, where she managed operations for Italy from Milan and later oversaw operations for Northern Europe from Amsterdam. Her first big advertising campaign was for Tourism Ireland, and she was part of the team responsible for developing a tourism website for the Irish government. Twohill was the head of marketing of the online travel agency Opodo until April 2003.

Twohill joined Google as the head of marketing for Europe, the Middle East and Africa (EMEA) in 2003. She was the company's first marketer outside the U.S. Twohill started as one of twenty London-based employees. She grew the marketing department from two people in London to a network of offices across the region. Twohill helped open Google's first owned office in her native Ireland in 2004. As an early employee, she was responsible for marketing Google Search to businesses. While leading marketing for Google in EMEA, Twohill helped launch the first Doodle 4 Google competition in 2005 from London, which let children design their own versions of the company logo. In 2009, Twohill was named global head of marketing and became responsible for one of the largest marketing budgets in the world.

Twohill helped launch Google's first-ever Super Bowl advertisement in 2010, as well as the company's in-house marketing agency Creative Lab. She worked with Sundar Pichai on a marketing initiative that helped Google Chrome become one of the world's top browsers. In 2014, Twohill was promoted to senior vice president of marketing. She oversaw the Google logo redesign in 2015.

Twohill is responsible for the marketing of core products including Google Maps and Google Search, platforms including Android and YouTube, hardware products including Pixel devices, and Google's artificial intelligence (AI) products, Gemini. Campaign magazine has credited her with playing "an important role in helping Google become the multibillion-dollar business it is today by marketing its expansion into new ventures and regions". At the 2022 Cannes Lions International Festival of Creativity, where the event's theme was "representing the underrepresented in creative work", Twohill launched Google's Accessible Marketing Playbook, which she said was open sourced to the industry to "make marketing work better for everyone".

In 2024, Google agreed to destroy billions of records to settle a lawsuit claiming it secretly tracked the internet use of people who thought they were browsing privately in its Chrome browser’s incognito mode. Coverage of the lawsuit described a 2019 email Twohill wrote to Google CEO Sundar Pichai, acknowledging the difficulty in marketing incognito due to its limitations.

=== Recognition ===
In 2014, Twohill was included in Forbes' list of the "world's most influential" chief marketing officers (CMOs) for the first time; she subsequently ranked number sixteen in 2019, and number eight in 2020. She became an inaugural inductee to the magazine's "CMO Hall of Fame" in 2022.

PRWeek included Twohill in a 2015 list of forty "marketing innovators". In 2016, Business Insider ranked her first in a list of the world's fifty "most innovative" CMOs, and included her in a list of the "most powerful" mothers. She was included in the website's 2019 list of Google's fifteen "most powerful" women. The Silicon Republic also included her in 2016 lists of forty "powerful women leading tech around the world" and thirty Irish "sci-tech leaders finding success" in the U.S. Twohill became the second woman to receive the Creative Marketer of the Year award at the Cannes Lions International Festival of Creativity in 2018. In her acceptance speech, she pushed for the industry to take a deeper look at the number of women in leadership roles. In 2024, she was named to Campaign magazine's annual list of top marketers making an impact on culture and the industry.

== Personal life ==
Twohill has worked from Google's headquarters in Silicon Valley, California, since 2009. She is married and has two children. She speaks five languages. Twohill was diagnosed with stage two cholangiocarcinoma in 2016 and has since recovered. She credits Nikesh Arora, Pichai, Jane Rosenthal, and Steve Stoute as some of her most trusted advisors.

== Boards ==
Twohill joined the board of directors of Telegraph Media Group in 2008, and became a director of Williams-Sonoma, Inc. in 2012. She was appointed to the board of directors of Palo Alto Networks in 2019.
