= Liligo.com =

Metasearch engine

liligo.com
- Industry: Travel; Technology; Metasearch Engine
- Founded: 2006; 20 years ago
- Founder: Pierre Bonelli
- Headquarters: Paris, France; Budapest, Hungary
- Products: Travel metasearch engine
- Owner: ODIGEO
- Subsidiaries: voyagermoinscher.com
- Website: www.liligo.com

liligo.com is a metasearch engine that specialises in travel. Launched in 2006, the website does not sell anything but allows users to compare travel products (flight tickets, hotels, car rentals, buses and trains).

The site is available in the following languages: English, French, German, Spanish, Italian, Portuguese, Hungarian and Romanian.

liligo.com offers an Android and iOS app (including a dedicated iPad app); fare alerts; a newsletter; and a travel news magazine.

== History ==
liligo.com is a production of Findworks Technologies, a start-up founded by Pierre Bonelli, Bertrand de la Ruelle, Xavier Corbel and Mikaël Quilfen in 2005. Based in Paris, Barcelona and Budapest, the company currently employs around 80 people.

Initially a flight comparison website alone, in 2007 liligo.com launched hotel and package categories. In 2008 the company launched extra features including flexible search and fare alerts. In 2009, the option to compare car rentals was added and in May 2009, the site launched its first television ad. An iPhone and iPad app was launched in 2010.

In September 2010, SNCF, via its site Voyages-sncf, announced it would take a major stake in liligo.com for the amount of 20 million Euros, according to Les Echos. liligo.com was resold 3 years later to European tourism giant ODIGEO. In 2015, liligo.com purchased VoyagerMoinsCher.com.

== Awards ==
Since 2013, liligo.com has held the title of "Website of the year – The Most Popular" in France.
