= Henri Wassenbergh =

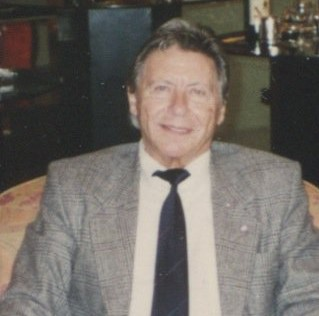

Henry Abraham Wassenbergh (Hattem, Gelderland, 16 August 1924 - 1 February 2014), known to his friends and colleagues as "Or" Wassenbergh, was a Dutch academic, professor of law, and writer.

== Education ==
Wassenbergh earned a law degree from the University of Amsterdam in 1950. He studied international law at the Sorbonne and at the Institute of Higher International Studies in Paris, France; and continued his studies in the Netherlands, earning a doctorate from the University of Leiden in 1957.

== Career ==
From 1950 through 1989, Wassenbergh was an official of Royal Dutch Airlines (KLM).

Since 1967, he had been a member of the Air Transport Commission of the International Chamber of Commerce in Paris. Wassenbergh also participated in the European Centre for Space Law (ECSL) of the European Space Agency (ESA), the International Institute of Space Law of the International Astronautical Federation, the International Air Transport Association (IATA) Air Policy Advisory Group, the Société Française de Droit Aerién, the Netherlands branch of the Legal Committee of the International Civil Aviation Organization, and the Netherlands Interdepartmental Committee on Civil Aviation. In this context, the title of one of his books seems prescient -- Principles of Outer Space Law in Hindsight.

== Asteroid named Wassenbergh ==
5756 Wassenbergh (6034 P-L) is a main-belt asteroid discovered on September 24, 1960 by Cornelis Johannes van Houten, Ingrid van Houten-Groeneveld and Tom Gehrels at Palomar Observatory.

This minor irregularly-shaped planetary body was named for Wassenbergh, who was Professor of Air and Space Law at University of Leiden from 1977 through 1994. The permanent designation was suggested by Prof. Wassenbergh's secretary and his colleagues at Leiden; and the announcement of this name was timed to coincide with his valedictory address at the university. He had been Professor Extraordinarius of Air and Space Law at Leiden since 1977, and Professor Ordinarius since 1991.

== Honors ==
- Order of Orange-Nassau (Officer), 1969, Netherlands.
- Order of Francisco de Miranda (Grand Officer), 1972, Venezuela.
- Order of the Netherlands Lion (Knight), 1989.
- Mérito Santos Dumont, 1991, Brazil.

== Awards ==
- L. Welch Pogue Award for Lifetime Achievement in Aviation, 1995.

== See also ==
- List of astronomical objects named after people
- List of asteroids named after important people
