= L. Welch Pogue =

American lawyer (1899–2003)

Lloyd Welch Pogue (October 21, 1899 – May 10, 2003) was an American aviation attorney and chairman of the Civil Aeronautics Board.

== Early life and education ==
Pogue was born in Grant, Iowa, on October 21, 1899, the son of Leander Welch Pogue and Myrtle Viola Casey. His mother home-schooled him after chores, and he began traditional schooling in eighth grade. He graduated from Red Oak High School in Red Oak, Iowa, in 1917. He attended Grinnell College and enlisted there in the Student Army Training Corps of the U.S. Army before transferring to the University of Nebraska, where he became president of the student body. After returning to work on the family farm for a while, Pogue received his B.A. from the University of Nebraska in 1924, and his law degree from the University of Michigan Law School in 1926. Later, Pogue received his Doctor of Juridical Science (S.J.D.) from Harvard Law School.

At Harvard Law School, noted law Professor and later United States Supreme Court Justice Felix Frankfurter took Pogue in as a protégé. As a lawyer, Pogue was entranced by Charles Lindbergh's trans-Atlantic flight and decided to focus his law career mainly on the "skies".

== Career ==
Pogue joined the Civil Aeronautics Board in 1938. Four years later, he was appointed chairman by President Franklin D. Roosevelt, and he served as chairman until 1946. During his tenure Pogue helped strike down a plan for a single world airline. He later resumed his law practice before retiring in 1981, after a career of nearly 60 years.

Pogue founded the Washington D.C.-based law firm of Pogue & Neal, which represented several major airlines and other industry clients. In 1967, Pogue & Neal merged with Jones, Day, Cockley, Reavis to become Jones, Day, Reavis & Pogue. Pogue served as Managing Partner of the Washington Office from 1967 to 1979.

Pogue was described by author James Parry as "a name synonymous with the pioneering giants who played a pivotal role in transforming international civil aviation ... into the cohesive global force that it is today ... Pogue is truly a living legend and a founding father of the international civil aviation system." Parry's book, 100 Years of Flight, was commissioned by the International Civil Aviation Organization, based in Montreal, Quebec, Canada.

== Personal life ==
He married Mary Ellen Edgerton on September 8, 1926, in Aurora, Nebraska. They were married for 75 years until her death in 2001. She was born October 27, 1904, in Fremont, Nebraska, the daughter of Mary Nettie Coe and Frank Eugene Edgerton, a direct descendant of Richard Edgerton, one of the founders of Norwich, Connecticut, and a descendant of Governor William Bradford (1590–1657) of the Plymouth Colony and a passenger on the Mayflower.

Her father was a lawyer, journalist, author and orator and served as the assistant attorney general of Nebraska from 1911 to 1915. She died on September 19, 2001, just days after her and Pogue's 75th wedding anniversary, at Johns Hopkins Bayview Medical Center in Baltimore, Maryland. Mary Ellen grew up in Aurora, Nebraska, and spent some of her childhood years in Washington, D.C., and Lincoln, Nebraska.

Mrs. Pogue received her bachelor's degree in music from the University of Nebraska in 1926 and was a member of Alpha Phi. They had three sons, Richard Welch Pogue, William Lloyd Pogue, and John Marshall Pogue who assisted his father on many research and writing projects.

Their grandson David Pogue, is an Emmy award-winning technology correspondent, writer and journalist.

His wife's brother was Harold Eugene "Doc" Edgerton, a professor of electrical engineering at the Massachusetts Institute of Technology, and credited with transforming the stroboscope from an obscure laboratory instrument into a common device.

== Death ==
He died on May 10, 2003, at Johns Hopkins Hospital in Baltimore, Maryland. He was 103 years old. He is buried at Quantico National Cemetery.

== Miscellaneous ==
In 1994, Aviation Week & Space Technology established the L. Welch Pogue Award for Lifetime Achievement in Aviation, naming Pogue its first recipient.
