= Delford M. Smith =

American aviator and businessman

- Oregon businessman Del Smith
- Born: Michael King; February 25, 1930; Seattle, Washington, U.S.
- Died: November 7, 2014 (aged 84); Dundee, Oregon, U.S.
- Education: University of Washington
- Occupation: Businessman
- Known for: Founding Evergreen International Aviation and Evergreen Aviation and Space Museum
- Awards: Wright Brothers Memorial Trophy (1999)

Delford Michael Smith (born Michael King; February 25, 1930 – November 7, 2014) was an American aviator and businessman from the state of Oregon. He was orphaned at birth and then adopted at a young age. Smith graduated from the University of Washington, and then served in the United States Air Force. Smith founded Evergreen Helicopters in 1960. This was the first of seven interrelated companies founded by Smith. All his companies were headquartered in McMinnville, Oregon. Later, Smith created the Evergreen Aviation and Space Museum in McMinnville, home of the Spruce Goose.

== Early life ==
Smith was born Michael King in Seattle, Washington on February 25, 1930. Just before his birth, his birth parents were in an automobile accident. His father was killed in the crash and his mother died a short time later while giving birth to him. After his birth, he was placed in an orphanage. At the age of 20 months, he was adopted by Emory and Mabel Smith and renamed Delford Michael Smith.

Delford "Del" Smith was raised by his adoptive mother in Bucoda, Washington. He grew up in poor conditions during the Great Depression and World War II. His mother worked in a candy factory and cleaned houses while Smith delivered newspapers and sold coal he found along local railroad tracks. He also did farm work in the summertime, using some of his money for flying lessons.

Smith attended public schools in Centralia, including Edison High School, from which he graduated in 1949. He went on to attend Centralia Junior College for two years before enrolling at the University of Washington. While at the University of Washington, he joined Phi Gamma Delta fraternity. He graduated from college in 1953 with a bachelor's degree in business and psychology. While at the university, Smith was enrolled in the Air Force Reserve Officer Training Corps, so upon graduation, he was commissioned as an officer in the United States Air Force.

The Air Force initially sent Smith to pilot training. However, he was released from flight training halfway through the program when it was discovered that he was color blind. Smith was then trained as a combat control team leader. This included his qualifying as a paratrooper. After completing his training, Smith was assigned to support the United States Army's 82nd Airborne Division. He served with that unit during the Korean War. While he was serving in the Air Force, Smith roomed with Slade Gorton, a future United States Senator. Smith and Gorton became lifelong friends.

== Businessman ==
After leaving the Air Force, Smith flew helicopters and fixed-wing aircraft commercially for several years. He learned to fly helicopters in 1955 while working for Dean Johnson Helicopters in McMinnville, Oregon. In 1960, Smith started his own company, Evergreen Helicopters. He began the business with a single Hiller UH-12 helicopter. Eventually, it grew into a large fleet of common and specialty helicopters. The company provided helicopters for spraying crops, fighting wildfires, logging, cargo transport, delivering air ambulance services, construction work, energy exploration tasks, disaster relief, and other commercial activities.

Evergreen Helicopters was the first of seven interrelated companies Smith founded and ran from his headquarters in McMinnville. Smith entered the airline business in 1975 when he purchased Johnson Flying Services of Missoula, Montana. That same year, he bought a large aircraft maintenance depot in Marana, Arizona. That facility was previously used to support Central Intelligence Agency operations in southeast Asia.

Evergreen International Aviation became his flagship company. At its peak, it was one of the largest air freight companies in the world. It also carried passengers on charter flights worldwide. Over the years, it flew many important missions. Evergreen transported the Shah of Iran into exile when his government collapsed in 1979. The company helped the World Health Organization deliver aid to Africa and delivered supplies used to extinguish the oil well fires in Kuwait. It also supported United States military operations around the world including Desert Shield, Desert Storm, Kosovo, Afghanistan, and Iraq in 2003. Evergreen supported United Nations peacekeeping missions in 30 countries and conducted drug eradication operations in Mexico and South America. The National Aeronautics and Space Administration's Space Shuttle Carrier was maintained at Evergreen's Arizona depot.

Smith eventually diversified his business holdings by creating Evergreen Aviation and Ground Logistics Enterprises, Evergreen Sales and Leasing, Evergreen Humanitarian and Relief Services, Evergreen Agricultural Enterprises, and Evergreen Unmanned Services. At its peak, Evergreen was doing business in more than 100 countries with a fleet of over 200 aircraft. By 1988, Evergreen had more than 2,300 employees worldwide. While his companies were producing over $460 million in annual revenue, they were also highly leveraged.

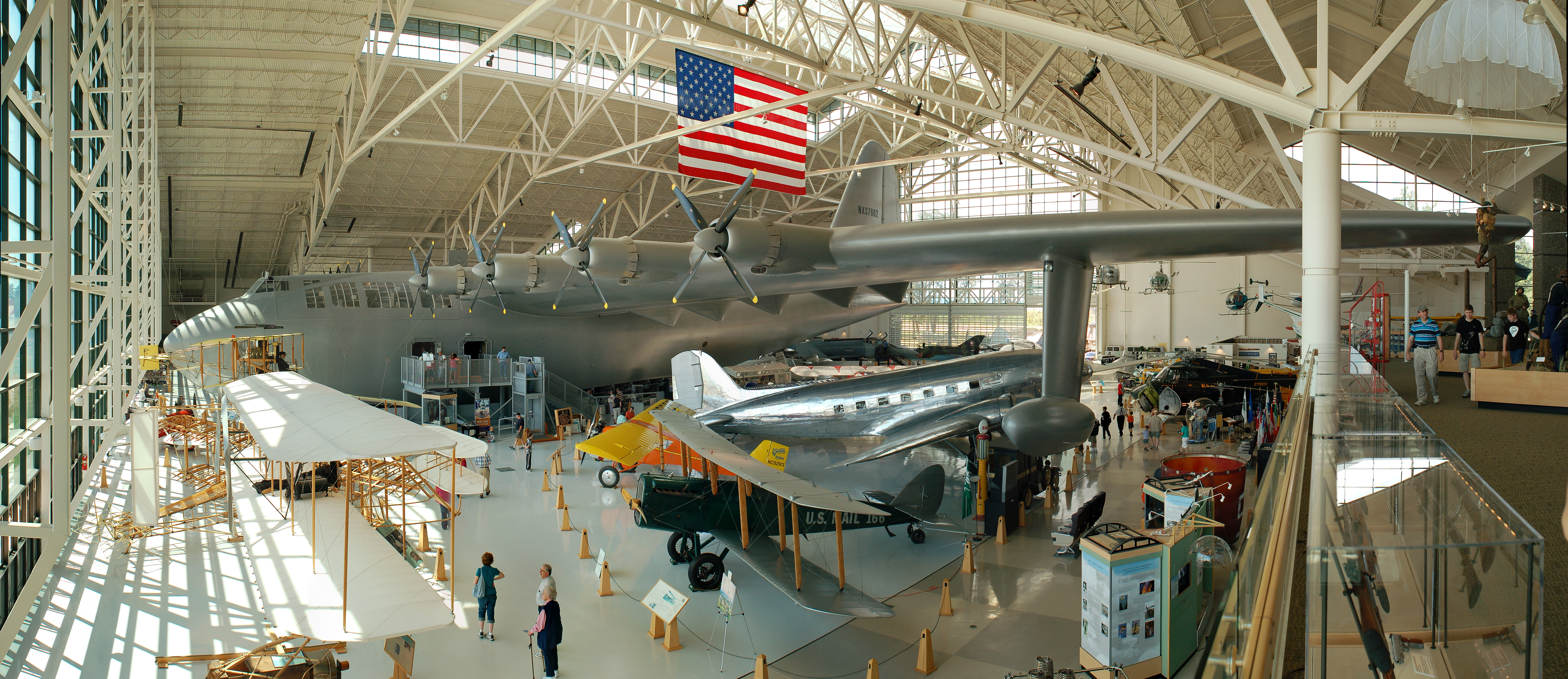
Main hall of the Evergreen Aviation and Space Museum

In 1991, Smith opened the Evergreen Aviation and Space Museum in McMinnville to showcase his vintage aircraft collection. In 1992, Smith agreed to buy the Spruce Goose from the Aero Club of Southern California. It took almost a decade to disassemble and move the plane from southern California to the Evergreen Museum. The Spruce Goose was reassembled and went on display at the museum in 2001.

Smith's Evergreen companies eventually ran into financial trouble. The Arizona depot was sold to Relativity Capital in 2011. In 2013, Smith sold his helicopter company to Portland-based Erickson Air-Crane for $250 million. The transaction included 64 air vehicles (mostly helicopters, but a few fixed-wing aircraft were also included in the sale). Evergreen ceased operations and filed for bankruptcy later that year. Eventually, the complex relationships between Smith's various companies prompted an investigation by the Oregon Department of Justice. In 2014, Evergreen's headquarters buildings in McMinnville along with its remaining aircraft and other assets were offered for sale.

== Aviation boards and awards ==
Over the years, Smith served on several aviation-related boards. These included the National Air Carrier Association's board of directors and the National Defense Transportation Association Airlift Committee board of directors.

The Museum of Flight recognized Smith with its Pathfinder Award in 1990. In 1993, the National Defense Transportation Association honored him with its Man of the Year award for outstanding support during Desert Shield and Desert Storm. In 1999, Smith was honored with the Wright Brothers Memorial Trophy, a prestigious national award sponsored by the National Aeronautic Association. Three years later, Aviation Week & Space Technology magazine recognized Smith with its L. Welch Pogue Award for Lifetime Achievement in Aviation.

Over the years, Smith was also recognized with the 2002 Horatio Alger Award, Lawrence Bell Memorial Award, and the Silver Beaver Award from the Boy Scouts of America.

== Death and legacy ==
Smith died of natural causes on November 7, 2014, at his home in Dundee, Oregon. Two public viewings were held at a McMinnville funeral home on November 12 and 13. Smith was then interred after a private funeral ceremony attended by members of his immediate family. On December 6, a memorial service for Smith was held at the Evergreen Aviation and Space Museum.

Today, the Evergreen Aviation and Space Museum is a major tourist attraction with over 200 vintage aircraft, space vehicles, and related artifacts on display. The Spruce Goose is still the museum's center piece. As of 2014, the museum was hosting 150,000 visitors per year.
