= EDreams ODIGEO =

Online travel company

eDreams ODIGEO SA
- Type: Public
- Traded as: BMAD: EDR
- Industry: Tourism
- Predecessor: eDreams
- Founded: 2011; 15 years ago
- Founder: Javier Pérez-Tenessa
- Headquarters: Madrid, Spain
- Key people: Dana Dunne (CEO)
- Website: www.edreamsodigeo.com

eDreams ODIGEO (sometimes referred to as simply "eDreams") is a Spanish online travel company that was formed in 2011 as the successor of eDreams with the merger of online travel agencies eDreams and GO Voyages, and the acquisition of Opodo (which included Travellink).

It has more than 21 million customers in 44 countries with 40,000 destinations and nearly 700 airlines. The company sells flights, hotels, vacation packages (flight and hotel), train tickets, car rentals, and travel insurance. Its headquarters are in Madrid with more than 1,700 employees worldwide.

== History ==
In 2010, Axa acquired Go Voyages and Permira acquired eDreams. Axa and Permira merged eDreams and GO Voyages, which jointly acquired Opodo in 2011.

eDreams ODIGEO was created in June 2011 when eDreams merged with GO Voyages and Opodo, the three largest European online travel agencies, through two private equity firms, AXA Private Equity and Permira Funds. eDreams' co-founder, Javier Perez-Tenessa, became the president of the holding group. By March 2014, the company reached €500 million in sales.

eDreams ODIGEO announced an intention to list on the Madrid, Barcelona, Bilbao, and Valencia stock exchanges in early 2014. On April 8, 2014, the company completed its initial public offering on the Bolsa de Madrid, at 10.25 euros per share, which valued the company at around $1.5 billion. This was the first ever initial public offering of an internet startup in Spain. The sale of shares was managed by financial organizations including JPMorgan Chase & Co., Deutsche Bank AG, and Jefferies Group LLC. It was the first company to go public in Spain since 2011. However, after five months, the stock price had fallen by 60%, reflecting the shared challenges of a difficult European IPO market. The stock later stabilized, with significant gains in share price including 160% gain in 2016.

In January 2015, eDreams announced that former Chief Operating Officer Dana Dunne was promoted to CEO. Previous CEO Javier Perez-Tenessa became honorary chairman. That December, Odigeo opened new offices in Barcelona on Bailén Street.

The company received industry awards including "Best Online Travel Partner Global 2015" (CFI.co), "Best Flight Booking Website 2015" (British Travel Awards), and "Best international Expansion" (eAwards – EMOTA).

In June 2016, it launched free intelligent push notifications on mobile apps for iOS and Android devices, so that travelers can be notified of any flight delays, cancellations, and diversions as well as gate announcements and baggage claim areas.

eDreams ODIGEO acquired the BudgetPlaces brand and portfolio from EnGrande in January 2017.

After completing a strategic review in November 2017 compiled by Morgan Stanley, it was announced that Odigeo was considering takeover bids in January 2018. In March 2018, it was reported that Odigeo would not accept the unsolicited offers from potential investors. The company announced that it would transform its business model based on income diversification and price policy change.

In May 2018, eDreams ODIGEO released a flight cancellation guarantee, allowing customers to cancel their flights on the day of the scheduled flight and receive an 80% refund of the ticket price for any reason. The policy gives travelers flexibility through the availability of a refund, with a maximum refund limit per person.

== Brands ==
eDreams ODIGEO has five brands that offer flights, hotels, car rentals, and vacation packages.

=== eDreams ===
eDreams was the first internet travel company in Europe and first online travel agency in Spain.

In 1999, eDreams was founded in Silicon Valley by Javier Perez-Tenessa, James Hare, and Mauricio Prieto.

=== Opodo ===
A joint venture between nine European airlines including Aer Lingus, Air France, Alitalia, Austrian Airlines, British Airways, Finnair, Iberia, KLM, and Lufthansa in August 2000 created a new company, Opodo. Amadeus took a controlling stake in the company in 2004 and increased its stake to 99.74% in 2008. In 2009, Amadeus took control of 100% of Opodo's stake after acquiring AirLingus' shares. Amadeus sold Opodo to AXA Private Equity and Permira funds in February 2011. Opodo continues to operate as a leading online travel agency in the UK.

=== GO Voyages ===
GO Voyages is a travel service company that manages airline tickets, hotel bookings, weekend stay, and flight management. It is a leader in the French market.

=== Travellink ===
Travellink was founded in 2000 and was acquired by Opodo in 2005. It became part of eDreams ODIGEO with Opodo. Travellink is the number one travel company in Scandinavian countries. In 2016, eDreams ODIGEO sold the corporate travel business of Travellink in Germany, Sweden, Finland, Norway, and Denmark to Flight Center Travel.

=== Liligo ===
In 2005, the travel search engine Liligo was established. It raised two funding rounds, including a 3 million euro round in 2008. In 2010, Liligo was acquired by Voyages-SNCF.com. Liligo was acquired by eDreams ODIGEO in 2013. The company operates in Hungary.

== Products ==
=== Prime ===
In October 2017 eDreams ODIGEO launched a travel subscription program called eDreams Prime. The company’s Prime program initially included discounts on airfare and later in June 2020 it expanded also to accommodation. Prime has registered a growth of subscribed members from 125,000 in the first quarter to 450,000 in the second quarter of 2020. Faced with the pandemic, eDreams ODIGEO launched a giveaway campaign offering new subscribers a free six-month trial period for Prime.

In June 2020 eDreams ODIGEO expanded its subscription program, Prime, to add accommodation. The product, which previously covered only flights, has been expanded to hotel fares (on more than 2.1 million hotels worldwide since November 2020) and is available on eDreams, Opodo, and GO Voyages. According to eDreams ODIGEO, Prime members can save an average of €250 per trip combining hotels and flights.

In May 2021, Prime reached one million subscribers. The OTA’s subscription model increased its membership by 58% over the year to 876,000 subscribers and it reached one million subscribers in May. eDreams Odigeo forecasts to reach two million subscribers by September 2022. Over the last two years Prime has reached 6 Million subscribers (May 2024). In February 2025, Prime surpassed 7 Million subscribers.

=== Prime hotels ===
In June 2020, eDreams ODIGEO expanded its subscription program, Prime, to add accommodation. The product, which previously covered only flights, has been expanded to hotel fares (on more than 2.1 million hotels worldwide since November 2020) and is available on eDreams, Opodo and GO Voyages. According to eDreams ODIGEO, Prime members can save an average of €250 per trip by combining hotels and flights.

=== New tech hubs ===
eDreams ODIGEO announced the launch of two new tech hubs in Porto and Milan in the first quarter of 2020. The company hired 100 employees between the two offices in Portugal and Italy, including front and back-end engineers, and iOS and Android developers. This tech force works across eDreams ODIGEO's 261 websites worldwide and alongside its product and developers' teams based respectively in Barcelona and Madrid.

=== AI-powered industry insights ===
In October 2020, eDreams ODIGEO launched a new data insights service to help tourism organizations and local governments understand travel trends and consumer habits. The service is available on a subscription basis depending on the data requested. eDreams ODIGEO’s data is used by tourist boards and policymakers to support their tourism strategy and boost national economies. The data is also used to target audiences and regain market share, especially in the postpandemic era.

== Annual studies and reports ==
=== Best airlines in the world ===
eDreams ODIGEO produces an annual classification of the best airlines in the world for its eDreams brand. The airline ranking is based on data collected from bookings and customer surveys on over 650 airlines.

In 2021, eDreams ODIGEO updated its methodology to include more components relevant to the COVID-19 pandemic. The new classification rated airlines based on refund viability, flight cancellations, ticket flexibility, customer experience, and COVID-19 safety measures. In 2021, Qatar Airways was named the best airline in the world by eDreams.

List of former winners of eDreams ODIGEO’s best airline in the world study
Year	Winner of best airline in the world
2021	Qatar Airways
2020	Emirates
2019	Turkish Airlines
2018	Turkish Airlines
2017	Emirates
2016	N/A
2015	Luxair
2014	Emirates
2013	Singapore Airlines
2012	Singapore Airlines

=== Best airports in the world ===
From 2010 to 2019, eDreams ODIGEO published an annual study of the best and worst airports in the world. Airports were rated for their overall appeal as well as for their waiting areas, shopping facilities, and restaurants. A score out of 5 was given to each airport to form the ranking of best and worst airports in the world.

In 2019, eDreams only published the best airports in the world ranking, without publishing the worst airports in the world.

List of best and worst airports in the world according to eDreams
Year	Best airport in the world	Worst airport in the world
2019	Singapore Changi Airport	N/A
2018	Singapore Changi Airport	Casablanca Mohammed V Airport
2017	Helsinki-Vantaa Airport	Berlin Schönefeld Airport
2016	N/A	N/A
2015	Singapore Changi Airport	Casablanca Mohammed V Airport
2014	Düsseldorf Airport	Rio de Janeiro International Airport
2013	Narita International Airport	Paris Orly Airport
2012	N/A	N/A
2011	Incheon International Airport	N/A
2010	Dubai Airport	N/A

=== COVID-19 travel trends report ===
eDreams ODIGEO uses booking data to predict the next year’s travel trends. In 2020, it used data from 17 million customers to reveal the most booked destinations for the following year. In 2021, Lisbon was the most booked destination for European travelers.

The COVID-19 pandemic in 2020-2021 saw a shift in Europeans favoring short-haul flights over long-haul flights as travel remained uncertain. During the pandemic, customers booked their flights and holidays less in advance than in other years. In the summer of 2020, 33% of travelers booked their flights 0–5 days before departure, compared to 2019 when the most popular time period to book travel was 31 days in advance.

=== Consumer booking preferences report ===
In 2021, eDreams ODIGEO commissioned an independent poll with OnePoll to reveal traveler booking preferences post-COVID-19. 10,000 adults from 8 countries were surveyed to understand how consumers book online travel. The findings from the poll revealed that 75% of respondents expressed a preference to book via an OTA as opposed to direct with an airline due to convenience and cost.

=== Best time to book annual study ===
eDreams ODIGEO produces an annual study of the best time of year to book a flight, based on bookings made through their websites in the previous years.

The best time to book a study is published on Opodo, one of the eDreams ODIGEO brands. In 2020, the study found that the cheapest month for booking a flight was January.

== Corporate affairs ==
The leadership team includes Dana Dunne (Chief Executive Officer), David Elizaga (Chief Financial Officer), and Gerrit Goedkoop (Chief Operating Officer) as well as Carsten Bernhard (Chief Technology Officer).

Thomas Vollmoeller serves as chairman and Javier Perez-Tenessa is honorary chairman. The Board of the Company includes Thomas Vollmoeller, Carmen Allo, Dana Dunne, David Elizaga, Daniel Setton, Lise Fauconnier, Benoit Vauchy, Pedro López, and Amanda Wills.

== Controversies ==
=== Israeli settlements ===
eDreams ODIGEO has been included in the United Nations Human Rights Council database of businesses involved in Israeli settlement activity, first published in 2020 and updated in 2023. The database identifies companies conducting business activities in Israeli settlements in the West Bank and the occupied Golan Heights that raise concerns under international law.

A 2024 report by SOMO (Centre for Research on Multinational Corporations), a Dutch research organisation, documented more than 43 accommodation listings on eDreams platforms in Israeli-occupied territories, including test bookings that were successfully completed. Spanish civil society organisations and BDS activists held a protest outside eDreams ODIGEO's annual general meeting in Madrid on 8 July 2025, calling on the company to cease facilitating reservations in settlement areas. At the meeting, the company's CFO stated that eDreams did not carry out any direct or indirect activity in the Occupied Palestinian Territories.

In September 2025, eDreams announced the removal of all accommodation listings in occupied territories from its platforms, attributing their presence to third-party data uploads. The Office of the United Nations High Commissioner for Human Rights subsequently removed eDreams ODIGEO and Opodo from its database on 26 September 2025. Civil society organisations, such as Amnesty International, contested the removal, documenting that settlement listings continued to appear on accommodation.edreams.es following the announcement.

In February 2026, a coalition of Spanish civil society organisations filed a criminal complaint in the courts of Madrid against eDreams ODIGEO, Booking.com, and an Expedia subsidiary. The complaint alleged money laundering from proceeds linked to war crimes in occupied Palestinian and Syrian territories, invoking Articles 301 and 611 of the Spanish Penal Code and Spain's Royal Decree-Law 10/2025, adopted in September 2025, which prohibits the advertising of services in occupied territories.
