= Jane Garvey (aviation administrator) =

American politician

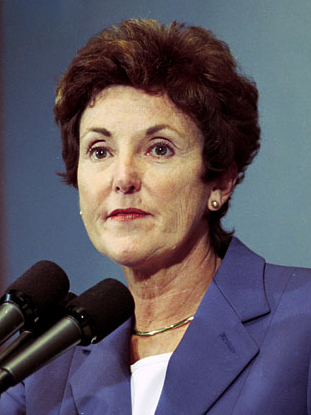

14th Administrator of the Federal Aviation Administration
- In office August 4, 1997 – August 2, 2002
- President: Bill Clinton; George W. Bush
- Preceded by: David Hinson
- Succeeded by: Marion Blakey

Personal details
- Born: February 2, 1944 (age 82) New York City, New York, U.S.
- Party: Democratic
- Education: Mount St. Mary College, New Hampshire (BA); Mount Holyoke College (MA)

Jane F. Garvey is an American former government transportation and public works official, now a business executive, and the chairman of Meridiam North America. She was the first female Administrator of the U.S. Federal Aviation Administration from 1997 to 2002. In May 2018, she was tapped to become the first female chairman of United Continental Holdings.

== Biography ==
=== Early life ===
Garvey (née Famiano) -- daughter of an Air Force colonel—was born in Brooklyn, New York on February 2, 1944, but was raised primarily in western Massachusetts, near Amherst College.

=== Education ===
Garvey (Famiano) earned her B.A. from Mount Saint Mary College (a Catholic women's college in Hooksett, New Hampshire which closed in 1978) and her master's degree (M.A.T.) in English instruction from Mount Holyoke College in 1969.

At Harvard, she finished a fellowship program developed for public leaders.

=== Early career ===
==== Teacher ====
Prior to her government career, Garvey had worked as a teacher specializing in English and history at South Hadley High School. She later taught at her master's degree alma mater, Mount Holyoke College. She also taught at Immaculata High School in Manchester, NH from 1968 to 1970.

==== Public Works official ====
From teaching, she made what she later described in a 2000 interview as "the biggest quantum leap" of her career: becoming an associate commissioner of the Massachusetts Department of Public Works, which she described as "quintessentially a male agency".

Her first high-profile government role was as Massachusetts Department of Public Works commissioner from 1988 to 1991, appointed by Gov. Michael Dukakis to oversee the start of the controversial but deeply consequential "Big Dig"—Boston's "Central Artery" underground-highway project, the nation's costliest highway program—a program which the New York Times later described as part of her political "baggage".

==== Airport director ====
Her next official role was as director of Boston's Logan International Airport in the early 1990s. Garvey's principal assignments, as Logan Airport executive, were to assure freight and passenger road access to Logan during the "Big Dig" project, supervise the airport's aviation operations and planning, coordinate policies including developing a "second major regional airport", aviation noise rules, and promptly proposed high-speed, inter-city rail links connecting Logan Airport to New York City and northern New England.

==== U.S. Federal Highway Administration official ====
Starting June 16, 1993, she served four years at the Federal Highway Administration (FHWA), first as Deputy Administrator—then, starting in February 1997, briefly as Acting Administrator.

=== FAA Administrator ===
==== Appointment ====
In 1997, Garvey was appointed by President Bill Clinton as the 14th Administrator of the U.S. Federal Aviation Administration, taking charge in August, 1997 of the 49,000-member agency—in the process becoming several "firsts" for an FAA Administrator: she was the first Administrator appointed to a 5-year term, the first female Administrator, and the first civilian appointed Administrator who was not a licensed pilot (two other non-licensed Administrators were a former U.S. Air Force general and a former Secretary of the Air Force). Her lack of aviation expertise—in aircraft operations, maintenance, and certification, air traffic control, and aviation safety—created some consternation in aviation industry circles.

Garvey claimed "my own management style is one of meeting and talking to employees."

==== Key issues: 9/11 attacks, flight delays, institutional change ====
Garvey was the FAA Administrator during the September 11, 2001 attacks (terrorists hijacking U.S. airliners for suicide attacks against New York City and Washington, D.C.).

On the morning of the attacks—shortly after the hijacked planes were learned to have struck their targets—Garvey echoed approval of her subordinates' decision to order all 4,000 aircraft over the United States to land immediately at the nearest airport. The order was quickly underscored by her superior, U.S. Secretary of Transportation Norm Mineta, who was with Vice President Dick Cheney in a bunker under the White House. It was the first-ever emergency grounding of all civilian aircraft flying over the nation.

In December, 2001, in an unusual move, Garvey announced that customary performance bonuses would not be given out to personnel in the FAA, because the September 11th attacks—resulting largely from the failure of aviation security (at that time chiefly the FAA's responsibility) -- had so severely "disrupted the U.S. air transportation industry and the personal lives of people throughout the U.S." that she thought it would not be "appropriate to grant incentive payouts."

Garvey generally escaped criticism for the agency's failure to anticipate and prevent the attacks, and received some praise for helping to guide the aviation industry through the radically disruptive aftermath.

Though she arrived at FAA during a period of increasing airline flight delays, and FAA organizational dysfunction, the federal government reaction to the 9/11 events caused federal aviation authorities—including Garvey—to shift their attention to aviation security, instead, throughout most of her time at the FAA. The initial decline in air travel, following the 9/11 events took pressure off the flight-delay issues, but they began to re-emerge as airline traffic gradually rebounded, and were a growing problem by the end of her term.

==== Sexual harassment issues ====
Shortly after arriving at the FAA, during a period of intense national political attention to sexual harassment issues in the federal government, Garvey found the FAA (which she later characterized as "male-dominated") embroiled in a sexual harassment controversy. The allegations, chiefly at the FAA's air traffic control facilities in Orange County, California—which controlled the nation's busiest airspace region (Southern California) -- drew Congressional attention. Garvey responded by announcing "Our goal is zero tolerance"—proposing to respond to the issue with various training and accountability measures for staff—and by actively recruiting more women.

==== Labor relations ====
In 1998, Garvey and her team negotiated a new FAA contract with air traffic controllers that significantly changed the relationship between labor and management in the FAA—reversing the bitterly hostile relationship that developed during the Reagan administration, when union controllers went on strike, and were summarily fired by President Reagan.

The new contract—negotiated with the National Air Traffic Controllers Association (NATCA) president Mike McNally—sought to gradually eliminate 30% of supervisors by attrition, replacing them (initially) with 1% more air traffic controllers (particularly in busy towers), while shifting some of the leftover supervisor pay to the controllers, as raises. Particular attention was given to rewarding controllers with more demanding duties, and those working at busy airports.

Described by the Village Voice as the best contract NATCA ever had, it gave significant salary raises, and enabled fully certified controllers to earn $127,000 a year in the late 1990s—compared to the $31,000-a-year average controller salary under Reagan in 1981.

According to the New York Times, the new contract was a first for the federal government by allowing it to offer federal workers some merit-based incentives.

The FAA claimed the new contract would reduce controller errors (which had been on the rise), and would ultimately cut $140 million in costs in the first three years. However, Garvey was criticized by some for making overly generous contract concessions to the controllers' union.

From the contract deal, Garvey and President Clinton become popular with the controllers—particularly after Clinton, in 2000, signed an executive order declaring air traffic service was "an inherently governmental function", implicitly protecting the controllers from privatization.

Before Clinton's election and Garvey's appointment, the union had sued the Republican administration of President George H. W. Bush over efforts to privatize many of the nation's air traffic control towers (an attempt to eliminiate government-union jobs) -- a suit which remained unresolved long after Garvey's departure under President George W. Bush. However, the union reportedly softened under President Clinton and Garvey, and acquiesced to the privatization of 56 towers.

Garvey's popularity with the controllers' union would lead, years later, to her employment under President Obama to resolve subsequent labor disputes with controllers.

==== Y2K threat ====
As the turn-of-the-millennium approached, bringing with it the turn-of-the-century (from the 1900s to the 2000s), fear spread, globally, about the possible technical malfunctions that could result as computer hardware and software struggled to cope with changes in computer dates, because many had only been designed to use the last two digits of a year. Rollover of dates at the end of the year, from "1999" to "2000," in some computer software and systems, would simply go from the abbreviated date "99" to the abbreviated date "00"—essentially "rolling back the clock" and possibly confusing and disrupting automated operations.

The hazard became known as the "Millennium bug", the "Year 2000 problem" or simply "Y2K".

The FAA, in particular, appeared exceptionally vulnerable to this threat—in a way severely threatening public safety—because the nation's air traffic control system was largely computerized. As it turned out, the global threat was much less than feared, and the year transition proved relatively uneventful, worldwide.

To demonstrate publicly that the skies were safe, Garvey rode in a jet, aloft at midnight (Universal Coordinated Time) as the millennium changed. Garvey was credited with successfully leading the agency through the necessary preparations to prevent major problems.

==== "Cookies" violations ====
In 2000–2001, the Clinton White House issued an order through its Office of Management and Budget (OMB) ordering federal agencies to stop using persistent web-browser "cookies"—controversial software data tags quietly planted on the computers of visitors to federal websites, like notes, to gather and store information about the visitors on their computers, where it could be read by a government website on subsequent visits. Though specific exceptions were allowed, nearly all such use was deemed unacceptable by the OMB, and forbidden. However, an audit in 2001 found that many federal departments and agencies had violated the edict—and worst among them was the Department of Transportation (DOT), where 23 websites were found using cookies in violation of the OMB public privacy policy. Of the 23 DOT websites in violation, 20 were FAA sites. The DOT's Inspector General advised the FAA, which quickly assured him that it had corrected the problem—but a subsequent audit, required by Congress, found that they had not. The DOT followed up with sweeping action, soon claiming full compliance.

==== Presidential transition ====
In January, 2001, when Democratic president Clinton was succeeded by the Republican president George W. Bush, the Washington Post noted that Garvey was in a peculiar political predicament—because of the new law (of which she was the first beneficiary) which had made the FAA Administrator position a five-year non-removable appointment, legally immune from the normal ouster of officials when the White House changed political parties (a Congressional change in the 1996 FAA reauthorization law). However, other FAA political appointees (her deputies) were subject to re-appointment or dismissal by the incoming president—creating the awkward possibility that a Democrat FAA Administrator might have to "administer" the FAA through a cadre of hostile Republican deputy administrators. The Post, however, noted that Garvey may have "dodged a bullet" during this transition, because of two factors:

- Her boss, Clinton's Transportation Secretary Norm Mineta—with whom Garvey had good relations—was retained as Bush's Transportation Secretary, at first, and was expected to have some say in the subsequent FAA appointments.
- Garvey, herself, managed to maintain good relations across party lines.

==== Final assessments ====
In a hearing of the House Aviation Subcommittee, shortly before her term as Administrator expired, Garvey faced wide criticism of the FAA from aviation experts and members of Congress—with the subcommittee chairman, Rep. John Mica (R-Fla.), calling the FAA "dysfunctional". Garvey conceded that there should have been more progress during her tenure, but said the agency was "better focused and more customer-driven." And lawmakers reportedly praised her for efforts to reform the FAA's obsolete institutional culture, and for successfully preparing the FAA for the feared Y2K computer changeover, and for coping with the aftermath of the 9/11 attacks.

The Washington Post noted that she left the FAA "with her popularity intact," adding that it was an achievement that had "escaped every other FAA administrator." The Bush administration indicated it would accept an extension of her tenure beyond the end of her appointed term, but she declined, leaving the first week of August, 2002

=== Industry executive ===
Following her departure from the FAA, Garvey became the executive vice president of the consulting and public relations firm Apco Worldwide., as Executive Vice President and chairman of Apco's transportation practice.

In August, 2005, Garvey was named Vice President of corporate communications for Convergys, a provider of business, human resources, and customer-support services.

In 2009, she became a member of the board of directors of United Airlines, an airline she had previously regulated as FAA Administrator.

In early 2015, she became executive director for the infrastructure advisory group of JP Morgan Securities, which arranged private buyouts of various public highways and other assets.

=== Political advisor and negotiator ===
Following the 2008 presidential election, Garvey was named as one of six experts advising the Obama transition team on transportation issues. She was among a small group of candidates mentioned for the post of United States Secretary of Transportation in the Obama administration, though the eventual choice was congressman Ray LaHood.

Garvey's popularity with the air traffic controllers' union, from her time at the FAA, led President Obama to appoint her to negotiate labor disputes with controllers in 2009, settling a number of long-standing bitter union disputes with the FAA. The outcome so pleased NATCA union president Patrick Forrey that he thanked the President and Transportation Secretary, and called the outcome a turning point in FAA/controller relations.

In the 2016 U.S. presidential election, Garvey was one of a handful of transportation policy advisers to Democratic Party presidential nominee Hillary Clinton.

=== Other recent activity ===
Garvey is the chairwoman of the Capital-to-Capital Coalition, which works to promote non-stop service between Beijing and Washington Dulles International Airport. She is on the board of United Continental Holdings. She is chairman of Meridiam in North America, and has been a board member of MITRE since 2004.

In 2014, Garvey, with former U.S. Transportation Secretary Ray LaHood, co-chaired a 22-member Transportation Reinvention Commission, an advisory commission convened to study problems of the New York Metropolitan Transportation Authority.

In February 2015, Garvey was appointed by Massachusetts Governor Charlie Baker to a six-member task force reviewing problems with the Boston-area Massachusetts Bay Transportation Authority (MBTA), in the middle of wintertime service failures throughout the MBTA—America's fifth-largest mass transit system

In May 2018, Jane Garvey was chosen to become the next Chairman of United Continental Holdings. She will be the first female to hold the position in the joint history of United Continental Holdings.

== Honors and awards ==
- 2003: Honorary degree ("Doctor of Humane Letters") from Mount Holyoke College (her master's degree alma mater)
- 2010: Sentinel of Safety Award, National Air Traffic Controllers Association (NATCA)
- 2011: Glen A. Gilbert Memorial Award, Air Traffic Control Association (ATCA)
- 2017: L. Welch Pogue Award for Lifetime Achievement in Aviation from the International Aviation Club of Washington DC (IAC) and Aviation Week & Space Technology magazine.
- Distinguished Service Award, National Air Transportation Association (NATA)
- Leadership Award, National Council of Public-Private Partnerships
- Woman of the Year Award, Women Transportation Seminar
- Woman of the Year Award, Women in Politics

== Personal life ==
She lives in Amherst, with her husband, Robert J. Garvey, who was the sheriff of Hampshire County, Massachusetts for 32 years, being appointed by Governor Michael Dukakis in 1984 and retiring in February 2016. They have two adult children.

Government offices
Preceded by David Hinson	Administrator of the Federal Aviation Administration; 1997–2002	Succeeded by Marion Blakey
