= Jones Day =

American multinational law firm

- Headquarters: 51 Louisiana Ave NW, Washington, D.C. 20001
- No. of offices: 40
- No. of attorneys: 2,422
- Major practice areas: Full service
- Key people: Gregory M. Shumaker (Managing Partner)
- Revenue: $2.5 billion (2022)
- Date founded: 1893; 133 years ago (as Blandin & Rice)
- Company type: General partnership
- Website: jonesday.com

Jones Day is an American multinational white-shoe law firm based in Washington, D.C. Founded in 1893, the firm was originally headquartered in Cleveland, Ohio. It has represented more than half of the companies in the Fortune 500, including Goldman Sachs, General Motors, McDonald's, and Bridgestone. Jones Day has also represented the campaign of President Donald Trump, in 2016 and 2020.

Many attorneys from Jones Day have served as federal officials and judges, including U.S. Supreme Court Justice Antonin Scalia, former White House Counsel Don McGahn, former U.S. Solicitor General Noel Francisco, former Federal Trade Commission chairwoman Deborah Platt Majoras, and U.S. court of appeals judges Jeffrey Sutton, Gregory G. Katsas, Timothy B. Dyk, Chad Readler, Eric E. Murphy, and Eric Tung.

== History ==
Jones Day was founded in Cleveland in 1893 as Blandin & Rice by two partners, Edwin J. Blandin and William Lowe Rice. Frank Ginn joined the firm in 1899, and it changed its name to Blandin, Rice & Ginn. Rice was murdered in August 1910. In 1912, Thomas H. Hogsett joined the firm as partner, and it became Blandin, Hogsett & Ginn that year, and Tolles, Hogsett, Ginn & Morley a year later after the retirement of Judge Blandin and the addition of partners Sheldon H. Tolles and John C. Morley. After Morley retired, in 1928, the firm adopted the name Tolles, Hogsett & Ginn.

In its early years, the firm was known for representing major industries in the Cleveland area, including Standard Oil and several railroad and utility companies.

In November 1938, managing partner Thomas Jones led the merger of Tolles, Hogsett & Ginn with litigation-focused firm Day, Young, Veach & LeFever to create Jones, Day, Cockley & Reavis. The merger was effective January 1, 1939. The firm's Washington, D.C., office was opened in 1946, becoming the firm's first office outside Ohio. In 1967, the firm merged with D.C. firm Pogue & Neal to become Jones, Day, Reavis & Pogue.

=== Legal actions against unions ===
In the late 2010s and early 2020s, Jones Day represented several companies in legal proceedings against labor unions, including unions for employees of The Boston Globe in 2018 and Slate and Politics and Prose in 2021.

=== International expansion ===
The international expansion of Jones Day began in 1986 when the firm merged with boutique law firm Surrey & Morse, a firm of 75 attorneys with international offices in New York City, Paris, London, and Washington, D.C. In the following years, the firm expanded to Hong Kong, Brussels, Tokyo, Taipei, and Frankfurt.

=== Republican Party and conservative politics ===
Jones Day has historically focused on corporate law, but since Stephen Brogan became managing partner in 2003, it has increasingly shifted to aiding the Republican Party and the American conservative movement. In 2025, The Atlantic wrote that it was known for its Republican clients and for its conservative advocacy. During the Barack Obama administration, Jones Day challenged the constitutionality of the Affordable Care Act and the Consumer Financial Protection Bureau.

Jones Day provided services to Donald Trump for his personal legal problems, as well as helping his 2016 presidential campaign amid investigations into Russian interference in the 2016 election. This defense included trying to control which documents to hand over to investigators and which staff members to make available for interviews. A substantial number of Jones Day lawyers then joined the first Donald Trump administration. Jones Day partner Don McGahn, who was previously a member of the Federal Election Commission, served as counsel for the 2016 Trump presidential campaign and was later nominated to serve as Trump's White House Counsel. As of March 2017, at least 14 Jones Day attorneys had been appointed to work for the Trump administration.

Jones Day was outside counsel for the Trump 2016 and Trump 2020 campaigns. From 2015 to November 2020, Jones Day received more than $20 million in fees from the Trump campaigns. Jones Day earned more than $4.5 million for Trump 2020 campaign work between January 1, 2019 and August 31, 2020.

After Trump left office, Jones Day hired a significant number of former Trump administration lawyers, including Don McGahn and Noel Francisco. While Jones Day was seen to distance itself from Trump, between presidencies; it is among the law firms representing the Republican National Committee in various litigation matters, ahead of and following the Donald Trump 2024 presidential campaign.

When Trump became president again, in January 2025, the Trump administration hired Jones Day partner Brett Shumate to lead the Civil Division of the Department of Justice. In 2025, amid the second Donald Trump administration's targeting of big law firms that represented his perceived political opponents, the Trump administration did not target Jones Day.

== Operations ==
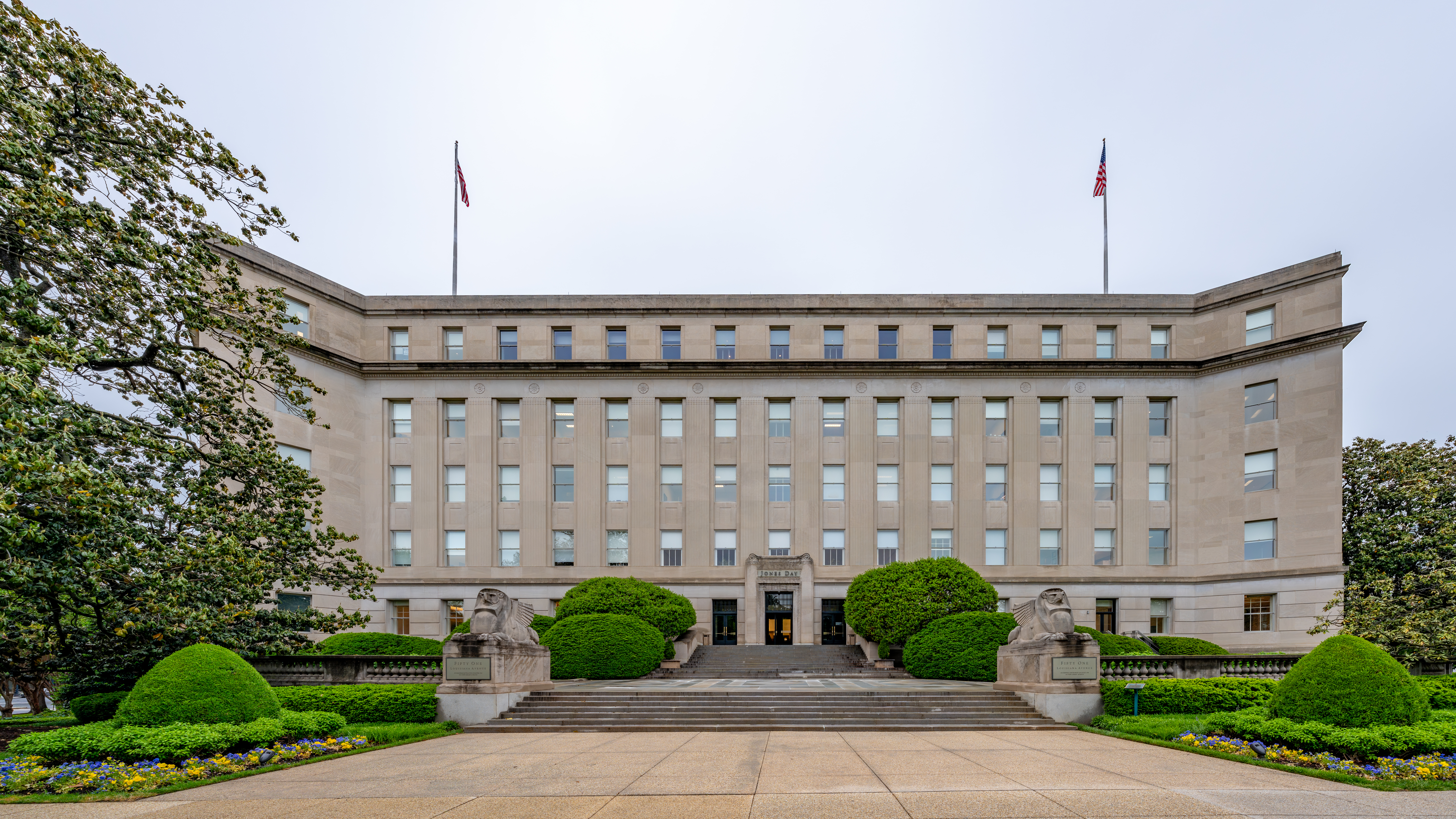
Jones Day headquarters are located in the Acacia Building, Washington, D.C.

In 2018, Jones Day was the fifth largest law firm in the U.S. and the 13th highest grossing law firm in the world. It is currently headquartered in Washington, D.C.

In 2019, some associates reported being under-compensated, compared to their peers at other firms, sometimes by tens of thousands of dollars, and that their compensation is much lower than what they were promised when they interviewed.

In 2023, it was among the largest law firms in the United States, with 2,302 attorneys, and ranked among the highest-grossing in the world, with revenues of $2.5 billion in 2022.

== Notable clients and cases ==
Jones Day's attorneys have argued more than 40 cases before the United States Supreme Court. Some of the firm's notable clients and cases include:

- As of 2022, Jones Day had represented R.J. Reynolds Tobacco Company since 1985. At one point, R.J Reynolds accounted for 19% of Jones Day's annual revenue. Jones Day continues to represent R.J. Reynolds Tobacco Company in high-profile litigation around the country.
- In 2009, it represented Access Industries.
- In 2012, it challenged the constitutionality of the Affordable Care Act.
- In 2013, Jones Day represented the losing party – a startup Myriad Genetics, Inc. – at the US Supreme Court in Association for Molecular Pathology v. Myriad Genetics, Inc.
- In 2014, Jones Day was lead restructuring counsel to the City of Detroit in connection with its chapter 9 bankruptcy case filed in July 2013 In re City of Detroit, Michigan, No. 13-bk-53846 (Bankr. E.D. Mich.)
- In 2017, it represented National Public Radio in a lawsuit challenging the U.S. Federal Emergency Management Agency's ("FEMA") withholding of critical information. National Public Radio, Inc., et al. v. Federal Emergency Management Agency, et al., No. 1-17-cv-00091 (D.D.C.)
- In 2020 it submitted a brief of amicus curiae on behalf of its client Chevron in Nestle v. Doe, raising the pleading requirements for plaintiffs stating a claim under the Alien Tort Statute.
- In 2020, Jones Day provided counsel to Wikimedia Foundation in a legal case against the foundation by a globally banned editor, and was described as Wikimedia Foundation's "primary law firm" by the Institute for New Economic Thinking in 2021. In 2025, The Legal 500 listed Wikimedia Foundation as one of Jones Day's nine "key clients".
- In 2021, it represented the National Rifle Association of America.
- In 2021, it represented the Alabama Association of Realtors in a successful legal challenge to the Center for Disease Control's nationwide eviction moratorium (Alabama Association of Realtors v. Department of Health and Human Services). The CDC eviction moratorium covered approximately 30-40 million renters at risk of eviction.
- In 2022, it represented Chevron in a MDL-class action lawsuit, denying that its herbicide product Paraquat causes the onset of Parkinson's disease.
- In 2022, Jones Day represented the Arizona Republican Party in Brnovich v. Democratic National Committee. Jones Day successfully defended against the DNC's legal challenge to Arizona voting laws that had a disparate impact on racial minorities.
- In 2022, it served as outside counsel for the Trump 2016 and Trump 2020 campaigns. Jones Day collected more than $19 million from Trump's operation since 2020.
- In 2022, it represented the North American Coal Corporation in a legal challenge to the Environmental Protection Agency's rule-making power under the Clean Air Act (West Virginia v. EPA).
- In 2023, Jones Day represented Eurasian Natural Resources Corporation

== Notable attorneys and alumni ==
- Carson Block (born 1977), short-seller and investor
- Marvin Bower, led McKinsey & Co.
- Yvonne Brathwaite Burke, former U.S. congresswoman
- James Brokenshire, Northern Ireland Secretary under Prime Minister Theresa May
- Yvette McGee Brown, first African-American female justice on the Supreme Court of Ohio
- David L. Carden, former U.S. ambassador to the Association of Southeast Asian Nations (ASEAN)
- Alex Chalk KC, former Lord Chancellor and Member of Parliament for Cheltenham
- Kyle Diamantas, acting Commissioner of the United States Food and Drug Administration
- Timothy Dyk, judge for the United States Court of Appeals for the Federal Circuit
- Noel Francisco, former United States Solicitor General in the Donald Trump administration
- Benjamin Ginsberg, lawyer
- Jonathan Gould, former partner, Comptroller of the Currency, former chief counsel for the Senate Banking Committee
- Erwin Griswold, former United States Solicitor General and Harvard Law School Dean
- Jane Harman, former U.S. congresswoman
- Justin Herdman, United States Attorney for the Northern District of Ohio
- Gregory Katsas, judge for the United States Court of Appeals for the D.C. Circuit
- Megyn Kelly, journalist
- Deborah Platt Majoras, former Procter & Gamble Chief Legal Officer; former Federal Trade Commission chair
- Donald McGahn, former White House Counsel in the Donald Trump administration
- Carmen Guerricagoitia McLean, associate judge on the Superior Court of the District of Columbia
- Sundaresh Menon, Chief Justice of Singapore
- Eric E. Murphy, judge for the United States Court of Appeals for the Sixth Circuit
- David Nahmias, former chief justice of the Supreme Court of Georgia
- Morgan E. O'Brien, former co-founder and chairman of Nextel Communications
- Kevyn Orr, former emergency financial manager for Detroit, Michigan
- Chaka Patterson, fundraiser for Barack Obama and Hillary Clinton, former Chief of the Cook County State's Attorney's Office, Civil Division
- L. Welch Pogue, former chairman of the Civil Aeronautics Board
- Chad Readler, judge for the United States Court of Appeals for the Sixth Circuit
- Antonin Scalia, former Supreme Court associate justice
- Sparkle L. Sooknanan, judge for the United States District Court for the District of Columbia
- Jeffrey Sutton, chief judge of the United States Court of Appeals for the Sixth Circuit
- Eric Tung, judge of the United States Court of Appeals for the Ninth Circuit
- Kara Westercamp, judge of the United States Court of International Trade
- James E. Hughes Jr., lawyer and author

== Pro bono work ==
- Since 2014, representing migrants, primarily women and children at the U.S.-Mexico border, with staffed office in Laredo, Texas.
- Launched Global Compendium of Laws on human trafficking- the first standardized collection of the relevant laws, on a country-by-country basis with the Rotary Action Group Against Slavery (RAGAS).
- With the National Center for Missing & Exploited Children wrote "The Attorney Manual: Guide to Representation of Children Victimized by the Online Distribution of Child Sexual Abuse Material," a more than 400-page document free to lawyers looking to help victims on a pro bono basis.
- With the American Bar Association, created VetLex, a national pro bono legal network to help veterans find volunteer attorneys that provide free and low-cost legal services.

== See also ==
- List of largest United States-based law firms by head count
