= Opodo =

European online travel brand

- Website type: Subsidiary
- Founded: 2001; 25 years ago
- Headquarters: Barcelona, Spain
- Area served: Europe
- Industry: Travel technology
- Products: Flights, hotels, package holidays, car rental
- Services: Online travel agency Subscription travel services
- Revenue: €32.3 million net income (FY2025, parent company)
- Operating income: Cash EBITDA target achieved (FY2025, parent company)
- Parent: eDreams ODIGEO
- Website: www.opodo.com

Opodo is an online travel brand of eDreams ODIGEO, a travel subscription platform headquartered in Barcelona, Spain. Founded in 2001 by a consortium of European airlines, Opodo operates across multiple European markets offering flights, accommodation and package holidays.

== History ==
Opodo was founded in 2001 by a consortium of European airlines, including British Airways, Air France, Alitalia, Iberia, KLM, Lufthansa, Aer Lingus, Austrian Airlines and Finnair. The initiative followed attempts by the US-based online travel company Orbitz to expand into the European market, prompting several European carriers to establish their own joint platform.

The founding management team selected by the airlines was led by Giovanni Bisignani, former CEO of Alitalia and Nicolas De Santis, former Chief Marketing Officer of beenz.com, the London-based digital currency startup.

Opodo launched its first website in Germany in November 2001, followed by the United Kingdom in January 2002 and France in April 2002. In 2002, David P. Scowsill was appointed CEO, replacing interim CEO Simon Tucker.

In 2004, Opodo was acquired by Amadeus IT Group for €62 million.

In 2006, Opodo launched its Italian website and introduced “one-way combinable” fares, allowing customers to combine tickets from different airlines within a single booking.

In 2011, Opodo became part of eDreams ODIGEO following the merger of Opodo, eDreams and GoVoyages under private equity ownership.

In 2012, Opodo launched its first 4in1 travel application to search and book flights, hotels, last‑minute deals and holiday packages within a single mobile platform.

In 2026, Opodo carried out a share subscription agreement, representing a capital transaction that supported the company’s ongoing business and investment strategy.

== Products and services ==
=== Opodo Prime ===
Opodo Prime is a subscription travel service launched in 2017, that offers members discounted pricing on flights, hotels and holiday packages in exchange for an annual fee.

The service forms part of the subscription programme operated across the eDreams ODIGEO group and contributes to its recurring revenue.

=== Opodo Prime hotels ===
In June 2020, as part of the expansion of the Prime travel subscription service operated across the eDreams ODIGEO group, hotel accommodation benefits were added to the programme to book a broad range of properties at discounted rates for the same annual subscription fee.

=== Flight price index dashboard ===
In June 2020, Opodo introduced a flight price index dashboard in the UK that compared current airfares with prices from the previous year to help users identify trends in ticket costs. The tool drew on aggregated fare data from hundreds of airlines to provide year‑on‑year price comparisons for consumers.

== Reception ==
=== Customer service ===
In 2022, Opodo implemented enhanced customer support measures by leveraging eDreams ODIGEO’s investment in AI and autonomous customer service technology, with independent industry reporting indicating deployment of agentic systems and generative AI to improve responsiveness. The group’s subscription model coincided with higher customer satisfaction and Trustpilot ratings for Opodo and its sister brands, with automated systems handling the majority of requests and measurable improvements in service metrics.

=== International trust ===
eDreams ODIGEO, Opodo’s parent company, also received a Better Business Bureau (BBB) accreditation in the United States, providing an external validation of the company's customer service and operational compliance.
