= List of Department of Transportation appointments by Joe Biden =

Below is a list of nominations and appointments to the Department of Transportation by Joe Biden, the 46th president of the United States. As of May 1, 2024, according to tracking by The Washington Post and Partnership for Public Service, 9 nominees have been confirmed, 1 nominee is being considered by the Senate, 7 positions do not have nominees, and 5 appointments have been made to positions that do not require Senate confirmation.

== Color key ==
Denotes appointees awaiting Senate confirmation.

Denotes appointees serving in an acting capacity.

Denotes appointees who have left office or offices which have been disbanded.

== Leadership ==
Office	Nominee	Assumed office	Left office
— Secretary of Transportation	Pete Buttigieg	February 3, 2021 (Confirmed February 2, 2021, 86–13)	—
— Deputy Secretary of Transportation	Polly Trottenberg	April 14, 2021 (Confirmed April 13, 2021, 82–15)	—
— Under Secretary of Transportation (Policy)	Carlos Monje	July 7, 2021 (Confirmed June 24, 2021 by voice vote)	April 2024

== Office of the Secretary ==
Office	Nominee	Assumed office	Left office
— General Counsel of Transportation	John Putnam	May 18, 2022 (Confirmed May 12, 2022 by voice vote)	July 2023
— Chief Financial Officer and Assistant Secretary of Transportation (Budget and Programs)	Victoria Wassmer	May 16, 2022 (Confirmed May 12, 2022 by voice vote)	—
— Assistant Secretary of Transportation (Administration)	Philip A. McNamara	January 21, 2021	—
— Assistant Secretary of Transportation (Tribal Government Affairs)	Arlando Teller	March 31, 2023	—
— Director of the Departmental Office of Civil Rights	Irene Marion	January 21, 2021	—
— Director of Public Affairs	Kerry Arndt	February 2024	—
— Director of Public Affairs	Ben Halle	August 2023	February 2024
— Director of Public Affairs	Dani Simons	January 21, 2021	July 2023

== DOT Assistant Secretaries ==
Office	Nominee	Assumed office	Left office
— Assistant Secretary of Transportation (Aviation and International Affairs)	Annie Petsonk	June 24, 2022 (Confirmed May 18, 2022 by voice vote)	—
— Assistant Secretary of Transportation (Governmental Affairs)	Mohsin Syed	May 4, 2022 (Confirmed April 7, 2022 by voice vote)	July 2023
— Assistant Secretary of Transportation (Transportation Policy)	Christopher Coes	June 24, 2022 (Confirmed May 26, 2022 by voice vote)	—

== DOT Administrators ==
Office	Nominee	Assumed office	Left office
Federal Aviation Administration
— Administrator of the Federal Aviation Administration	Michael G. Whitaker	October 27, 2023 (Confirmed October 24, 2023, 98–0)	—
Federal Highway Administration
— Administrator of the Federal Highway Administration	Shailen Bhatt	January 13, 2023 (Confirmed December 8, 2022 by voice vote)	September 10, 2024
Federal Motor Carrier Safety Administration
— Administrator of the Federal Motor Carrier Safety Administration	Robin Hutcheson	September 26, 2022 (Confirmed September 22, 2022 by voice vote)	January 26, 2024
Federal Railroad Administration
— Administrator of the Federal Railroad Administration	Amit Bose	January 13, 2022 (Confirmed January 12, 2022, 68–29)	—
Federal Transit Administration
— Administrator of the Federal Transit Administration	Nuria Fernandez	July 1, 2021 (Confirmed June 10, 2021 by voice vote)	February 24, 2024
Great Lakes St. Lawrence Seaway Development Corporation
— Administrator of the Great Lakes St. Lawrence Seaway Development Corporation	Adam Tindall-Schlicht	November 6, 2022	—
National Highway Traffic Safety Administration
— Administrator of the National Highway Traffic Safety Administration	Steven Cliff	June 9, 2022 (Confirmed May 26, 2022 by voice vote)	September 12, 2022; Joined the California Air Resources Board
United States Maritime Administration
— Administrator of the United States Maritime Administration	Ann Phillips	May 16, 2022 (Confirmed May 10, 2022, 75–22)	—

== Withdrawn nominations ==
Office	Appointee	Announced	Withdrawn	Notes
— Administrator of the Federal Motor Carrier Safety Administration	Meera Joshi	April 14, 2021	January 3, 2022	Nomination not resent
— Assistant Secretary of Transportation (Research and Technology)	Robert Hampshire	April 22, 2021	January 3, 2023	Continues to serve as principal deputy assistant secretary, starting on January 20, 2021.
— Administrator of the Federal Aviation Administration	Phil Washington	July 6, 2022	March 25, 2023	
— Administrator of the National Highway Traffic Safety Administration	Ann Carlson	February 13, 2023	May 30, 2023	Continued to serve as acting administrator, starting in September 2022.
— General Counsel of Transportation	Sarah Baker	February 8, 2024	January 3, 2025	

== See also ==
- Cabinet of Joe Biden, for the vetting process undergone by top-level roles including advice and consent by the Senate
- List of executive branch 'czars' e.g. Special Advisor to the President

== Notes ==
Confirmation votes

Confirmations by roll call vote

Confirmations by voice vote
