= Designated Airworthiness Representative =

A Designated Airworthiness Representative (DAR) is a private person designated by the United States Federal Aviation Administration to act on its behalf in the certification of type certificated and amateur-built aircraft for the issuance of airworthiness certificates, special flight permits, import aircraft, export certificates for products and articles, conformity inspections, and field approvals for repair and alterations. Most DARs have limited and/or certain "functions" authorized by the FAA based on their experience and technical background. A DAR may charge a fee for their services. Qualifications and policies for appointment of Designated Airworthiness Representatives are established in FAA Order 8100.8.

There are two types of DARs, DAR-F (CMS) and DAR-T (FSDO):

- A DAR-F primarily inspects/certifies new aircraft that have never been issued an airworthiness certificate (original certification), subject to Order 8000.95().
- A DAR-T inspects/re-certifies aircraft (recurrent certification), subject to Order 8110.37().

DARs work within their geographic region but may submit a pre-approval request for geographic expansion.

The aircraft owner or the owner's agent may either contact a DAR directly or contact the local FAA Flight Standards District Office (FSDO) or Certificate Management Section (CMS) for assistance. Consult the Designee Management System to identify a local DAR.
