= Daniel Elwell =

Acting Administrator of the US Federal Aviation Administration

Dan Elwell
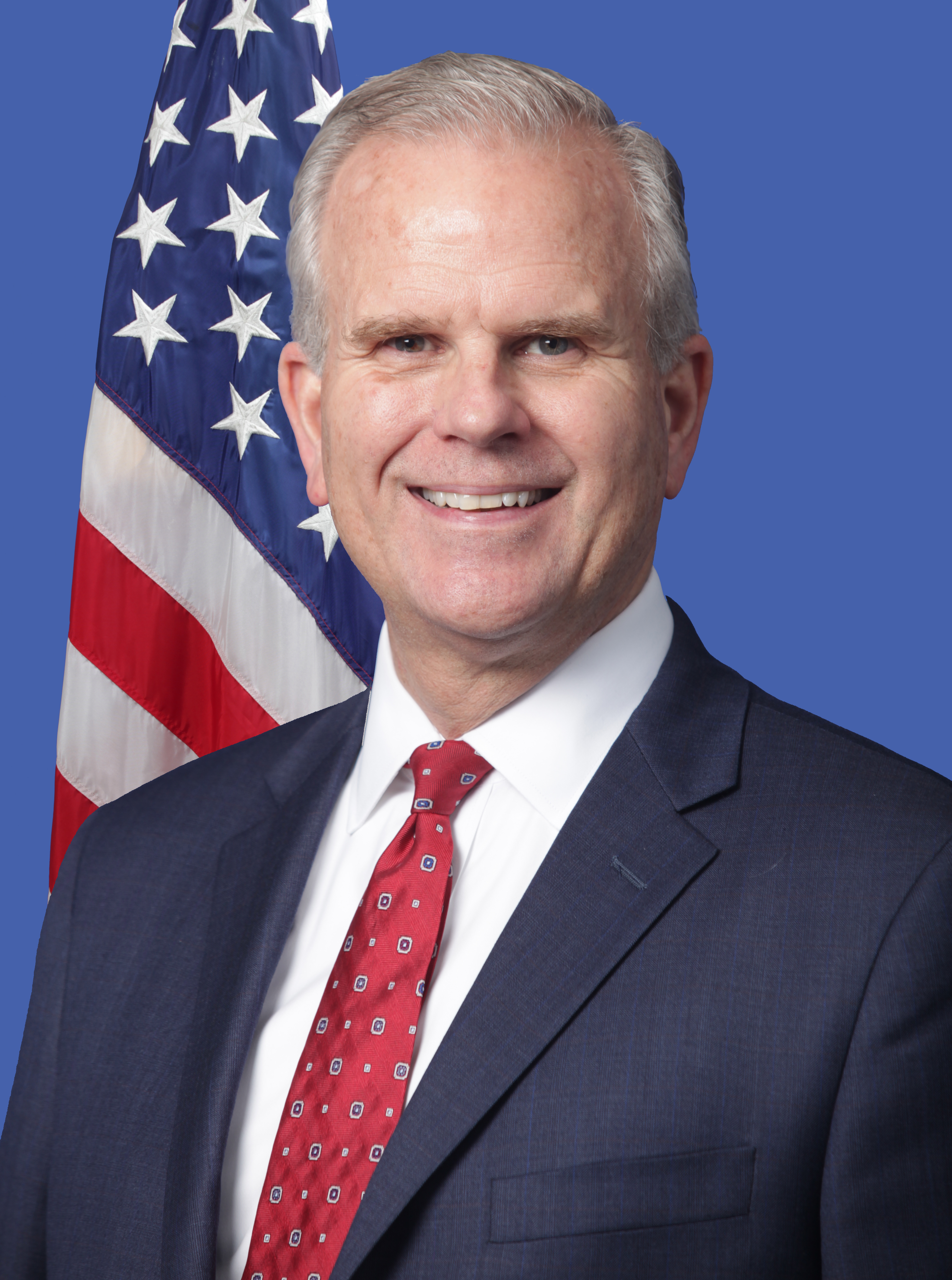

Acting Administrator of the Federal Aviation Administration
- In office January 6, 2018 – August 12, 2019
- President: Donald Trump
- Preceded by: Michael Huerta
- Succeeded by: Stephen Dickson

Deputy Administrator of the Federal Aviation Administration
- In office June 26, 2017 – November 20, 2020
- President: Donald Trump
- Preceded by: Victoria Wassmer (acting)

Personal details
- Party: Republican
- Education: United States Air Force Academy (BS)

Military service
- Allegiance: United States
- Branch/service: United States Air Force
- Rank: Lieutenant Colonel
- Battles/wars: Persian Gulf War

Daniel Kevin Elwell served in the first Trump Administration as Deputy Administrator of the Federal Aviation Administration (FAA), and as the Acting Administrator of the FAA in addition to running the Next Generation Air Transportation System.

Appointed by President Donald Trump to become the FAA Deputy Administrator in June 2017, Elwell was promoted to Acting Administrator on January 7, 2018. He was succeeded by Stephen Dickson in August 2019.

== Career ==
Raised in Long Island, Elwell graduated with a Bachelor of Science degree in international affairs from the United States Air Force Academy in 1983. He moved on to Williams Air Force Base where he earned his pilot wings.

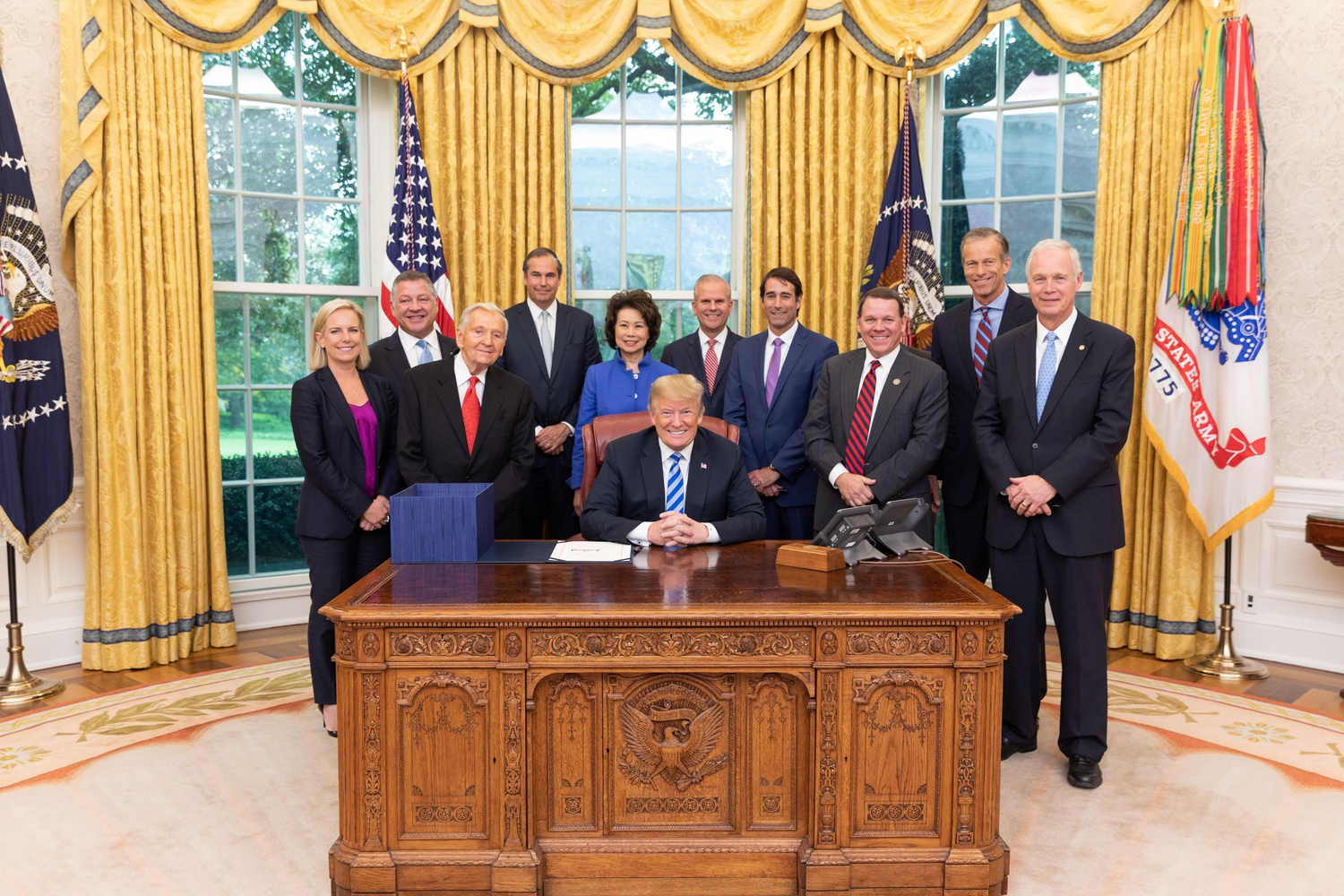
President Trump signs H.R. 302, the FAA reauthorization Act of 2018, with Elwell, Elaine Chao, and Members of Congress

Elwell was a command pilot for the U.S. Air Force and U.S. Air Force Reserve. Elwell fought in the Operation Desert Storm in a combat capacity. Elwell eventually reached the rank of lieutenant colonel. He retired soon after.

For sixteen years, Elwell was a commercial pilot for American Airlines. Elwell also had a role of American Airlines's managing director for international and government affairs. He also served as a legislative fellow for the late senator Ted Stevens. While working for Senator Stevens, Elwell was part of other aviation safety programs in Alaska, including the Capstone Program in the Yukon–Kuskokwim Delta, as well as the installation of real-time weather cameras at remote airfields and mountain passes.

Elwell was named vice president of the Aerospace Industries Association in 2008 where he stayed until 2013. Elwell was a civil aerospace manufacturer representative in this capacity where he was a lobbyist for various companies.

Elwell joined Airlines for America (A4A) in 2013, where he was the senior vice president for safety, security, and operations. Elwell left this role in 2015.

Elwell also served as the senior advisor on aviation to Secretary of Transportation Elaine Chao.

=== Federal Aviation Administration ===
Elwell was named acting Administrator of the FAA upon the expiration of the previous Administrator, Michael Huerta's term. From 2006 to 2008, Elwell was the FAA Assistant Administrator for Policy, Planning, and Environment. President Donald Trump appointed Elwell FAA Deputy Administrator in June 2017.

In an interview with Reuters in October 2020, Elwell announced he would resign from his position around the end of November.

Political offices
Preceded by Michael Huerta	Administrator of the Federal Aviation Administration; Acting; 2018–2019	Succeeded by Stephen Dickson
