= Safo =

Safo may refer to:

- Balcha Safo (1863–1936), Ethiopian general
- Lucy Safo, Ghanaian writer
- Safo, Mali, a town and commune in the Koulikoro Region of Mali
- Safo, Niger, a village and rural commune in Niger
- Safo, historia de una pasión, a 1943 Argentine romantic drama film
- Sarah Adwoa Safo, a Ghanaian lawyer and politician
- Safo'63, ("Love and Sex (Sappho '63)"), a 1964 Mexican film
- Derek Andrew Safo (1982–2026), British-Ghanaian hip-hop artist known professionally as Sway Dasafo or Sway

== See also ==
- SAFO, an information tool in the aviation community
- Sappho, ancient Greek poet
