= Chris Rocheleau =

American government official

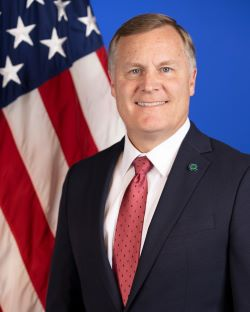
- Official portrait, 2025

Administrator of the Federal Aviation Administration
- Acting
- In office January 30, 2025 – July 10, 2025
- President: Donald Trump
- Preceded by: Michael Whitaker
- Succeeded by: Bryan Bedford

Deputy Administrator of the Federal Aviation Administration
- In office July 10, 2025 – July 31, 2026
- President: Donald Trump
- Preceded by: Katie Thomson
- Succeeded by: Liam McKenna (Acting)

Personal details
- Education: Central Connecticut State University (BA); City University of Seattle (MPA)

Christopher Joseph Rocheleau is an American government official who had served as the deputy administrator of the Federal Aviation Administration (FAA). He previously served as the acting administrator from January 30 to July 10, 2025.

== Early life and military career ==
Rocheleau attended Central Connecticut State University, receiving a Bachelor of Arts degree, and later the City University of Seattle, receiving a Master of Public Administration degree. He served in the United States Air Force initially as a missile launch officer in the USAF Ground Launched Cruise Missile Program. He was stationed at Comiso AS, Italy. Later, he served as an OSI agent on both active duty and in the Air Force Reserves. He later was a member of the Air Force reserves, retiring in 2010 with the rank of lieutenant colonel.

== Career as government official and administrator ==
In 1996, Rocheleau became an employee for the Federal Aviation Administration (FAA), working there until 2002, when he left to become a senior policy advisor for the Transportation Security Administration (TSA). He returned to the FAA in 2005 as an office director, before later becoming senior advisor in 2010, acting chief of staff from 2015 to 2016, counselor to the administrator from 2016 to 2017, and chief of staff from 2017 to 2020. He later held positions as executive director for international affairs, assistant administrator for policy, international affairs and environment, and acting associate administrator for aviation safety.

In 2022, Rocheleau left the FAA to become the chief operating officer (COO) for the National Business Aviation Association (NBAA). In January 2025, at the start of the Donald Trump administration, Rocheleau returned to the FAA as the deputy administrator. He later was appointed acting administrator of the FAA on January 30, 2025. His appointment as administrator came in the aftermath of a deadly plane crash that killed 67 near Washington, D.C., with Rocheleau being "tasked with handling the immediate response to the collision."
