= Michael Huerta =

Former Federal Aviation Administration head

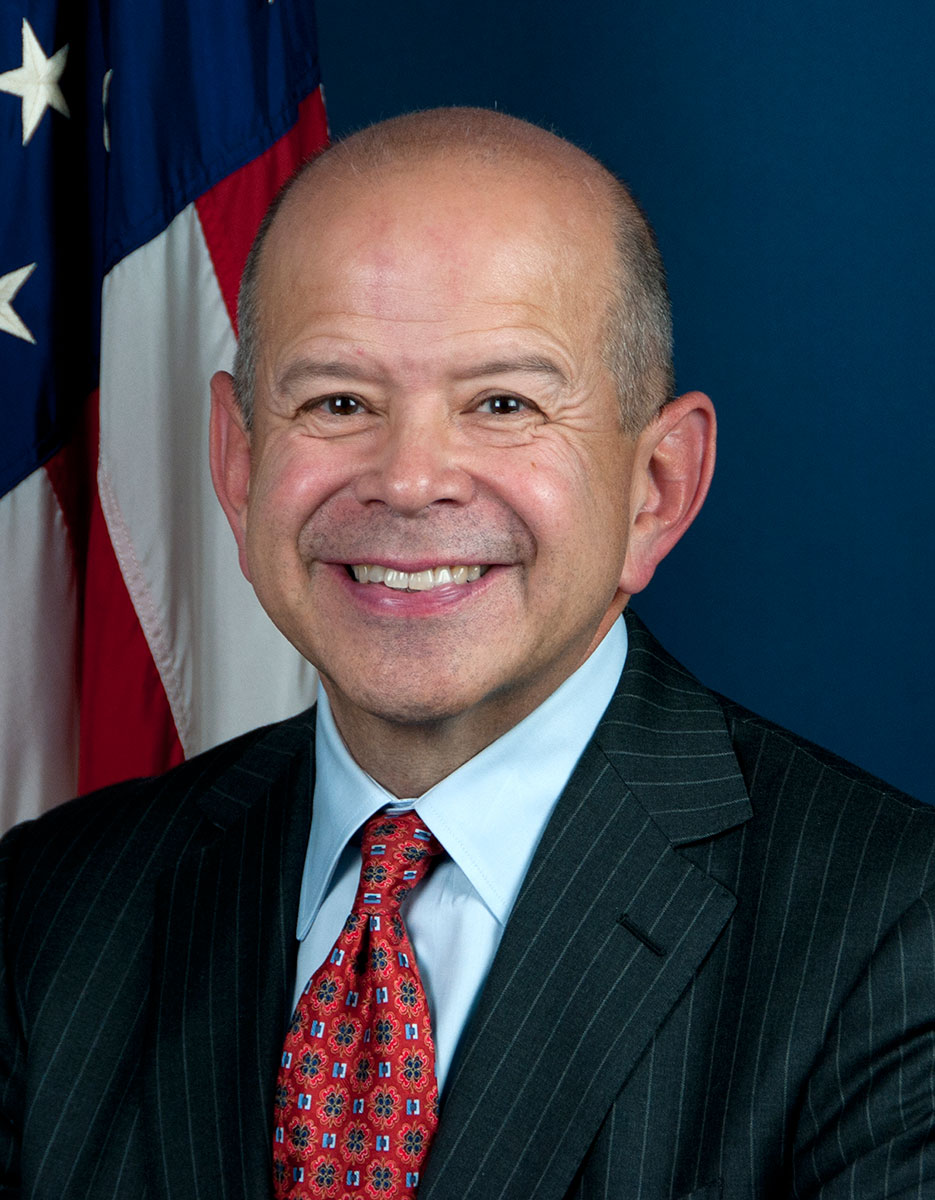

17th Administrator of the Federal Aviation Administration
- In office December 6, 2011 – January 6, 2018; Acting: December 6, 2011 – January 7, 2013
- President: Barack Obama; Donald Trump
- Deputy: Victoria Wassmer (acting); Daniel Elwell
- Preceded by: Randy Babbitt
- Succeeded by: Stephen Dickson

United States Secretary of Transportation
- Acting
- In office January 20, 2017 – January 31, 2017
- President: Donald Trump
- Preceded by: Anthony Foxx
- Succeeded by: Elaine Chao

Personal details
- Born: November 18, 1956 (age 69) Riverside, California, U.S.
- Party: Democratic
- Education: University of California, Riverside (BA); Princeton University (MPA)

Michael Peter Huerta (born November 18, 1956) is an American government official who served as the 17th Administrator of the Federal Aviation Administration from 2013 to 2018. He was also acting U.S. secretary of transportation under President Donald Trump for 11 days in 2017 until the Senate confirmed the appointment of Elaine Chao to the position.

== Career ==
Huerta received his bachelor's degree in political science from the University of California, Riverside and his master's in international relations from the Woodrow Wilson School of Public and International Affairs at Princeton University.

Huerta was commissioner of New York City's Department of Ports, International Trade and Commerce from 1986 to 1989 before leaving to serve as executive director of the Port of San Francisco until 1993. From 1993 to 1998 he held senior positions at the United States Department of Transportation in Washington, D.C., serving under secretaries Federico Peña and Rodney E. Slater during the administration of President Bill Clinton.

Huerta was a managing director with the Salt Lake Organizing Committee for the 2002 Olympic Winter Games, preparing Salt Lake City's transportation outlets for the Olympics, and organizing the logistics for the Olympic flame for its journey from Athens, Greece to Salt Lake City, Utah.

From 2002 to 2009, Huerta was group president of the Transportation Solutions Group at Affiliated Computer Services, a company later acquired by Xerox, specializing in business processes and information technology.

=== Federal Aviation Administration ===
President Obama nominated Huerta as Deputy Administrator of the Federal Aviation Administration (FAA) on January 26, 2010 and became Deputy Administrator of the FAA five months later.

On December 6, 2011, Huerta became acting administrator of the FAA upon the resignation of Randy Babbitt.

On March 27, 2012, President Barack Obama formally nominated him to serve as the next permanent administrator of the Federal Aviation Administration for a term of five years; the nomination was subsequently confirmed by the U.S. Senate on January 1, 2013.

From January 20 to 31, 2017, Huerta was briefly the acting secretary of transportation.

Political offices
Preceded by Randy Babbitt	17th Administrator of the Federal Aviation Administration; 2011–2018; Acting: 2011–2013	Succeeded by Daniel Elwell; Acting
Preceded by Anthony Foxx	United States Secretary of Transportation; Acting; 2017	Succeeded by Elaine Chao
