= Billy Nolen =

American government official

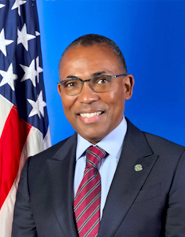

Acting Administrator of the Federal Aviation Administration
- In office April 1, 2022 – June 9, 2023
- President: Joe Biden
- Preceded by: Stephen Dickson
- Succeeded by: Polly Trottenberg (acting)

Associate Administrator for Aviation Safety of the Federal Aviation Administration
- In office January 1, 2022 – March 31, 2022
- President: Joe Biden
- Preceded by: Ali Bahrami
- Succeeded by: David Boulter

Personal details
- Education: Embry-Riddle Aeronautical University (BS)

Billy Nolen is an American government official who served as acting administrator of the Federal Aviation Administration (FAA) from April 1, 2022, to June 2023.

Prior to Nolen's appointment as acting administrator, he worked with American Airlines, Airlines for America, Qantas and WestJet in safety positions. He left WestJet in January 2022 to join the FAA and served as the associate administrator for aviation safety of the FAA, before resigning in April to become acting administrator. On June 9, 2023, he stepped down and was replaced by Polly Trottenberg.

== Career ==
Nolen first worked as a pilot for American Airlines in 1989 where he flew as a pilot and was type rated in the Boeing 757, Boeing 767 and McDonnell Douglas MD-80 aircraft. He joined Airlines for America on July 1, 2015, as the senior vice president of safety, security and operations after 26 years at American Airlines.

He joined Qantas in 2018 as executive manager for group safety and health. Nolen left his role at Qantas on February 24, 2020, to join WestJet as the vice-president, safety, security, and quality in Calgary, Canada.

It was announced he would join the FAA on December 17, 2021, and become the associate administrator for aviation safety on January 1. The position had previously been held by Ali Bahrami, but he stepped down in June 2021 owing to harsh criticism after the Boeing 737 MAX groundings following two fatal crashes.

After serving as acting administrator, he joined the company Archer Aviation in June 2023 as chief safety officer. He also became a board member of the AAR.

== Acting administrator of the Federal Aviation Administration ==
On February 16, 2022, the FAA administrator, Stephen Dickson, announced his resignation which would be effective on March 31. On March 26, the FAA announced they had named Nolen as acting administrator until the Biden administration could find a nominee to be confirmed by the United States Senate. He took office the day after Dickson's resignation.

In July 2022, the Biden administration nominated Phil Washington, CEO of Denver International Airport, to become the administrator and take Nolen's place. His confirmation hearing was delayed upon questioning about his limited aviation experience and allegations of corruption during his time as head of the Los Angeles County Metropolitan Transportation Authority, but he was renominated when the United States Congress went into its 118th session. However, Washington withdrew his nomination on March 25, 2023, due to not having enough support.

On January 11, 2023, a system outage occurred with the FAA due to the NOTAM system having a corrupt system file that ordered all flights to a ground stop for the first time since the September 11 attacks. The outage sparked criticism on the administration for not sufficiently upgrading systems. Nolen responded by saying that his "agency is working to determine what caused the breakdown to ensure it doesn’t happen again." On the day of the outage, Nolen was supposed to go to Mexico on a planned trip to review progress on recovering their air safety rating, but it was canceled following the issue.

On February 28, 2023, Nolen announced a safety review following several aircraft near miss incidents in early 2023.

On April 21, 2023, Nolen announced that he intended to resign. In June 2023 he resigned and Polly Trottenberg succeeded him.
