= AIRR =

AIRR may refer to:

- Advocates for Immigrant Rights and Reconciliation, a U.S. non-profit organization
- Australian Independent Rural Retailers, a former Australian company acquired by Elders Limited
- Aviation Innovation, Reform, and Reauthorization Act (AIRR Act), a proposed US bill
- Aviation Rescue Swimmer, a rating in the US Navy
- Average internal rate of return, a measure of Internal rate of return in finance
- Airr, son of basketball players Anna Petrakova and Candace Parker
