= List of U.S. aircraft near-miss incidents since 2023 =

With seven runway incursions of United States commercial aircraft during January and February, the first two months of 2023 saw the highest rate of such incidents in five years. 2018 to 2022 combined had 23 comparable incidents, 5 of which occurred in 2022. The events prompted a review by the Federal Aviation Administration, announced by acting administrator Billy Nolen on February 28, 2023. The review started on March 15. For the first time in 14 years, U.S. aviation industry leaders met the same day at a safety summit.

An August 2023 report in The New York Times found that 46 close calls had occurred involving commercial airliners in the previous month. In one instance, two consecutive aircraft taking off from San Francisco International Airport nearly hit a Frontier Airlines plane whose nose had intruded onto the runway, each only missing by a small margin that an internal FAA report called "skin to skin". The New York Times investigation attributed the increase in incidents in large part to a shortage in air traffic controller staffing, with overworked controllers making more errors.

On January 29, 2025, approximately two years after these incidents became a more frequent issue, the deadliest commercial aviation disaster in more than a decade occurred between an American Airlines jet and a military helicopter.

== List of incidents ==
The list below includes all newsworthy near miss incidents at U.S. airports since 2023:

Date	Location	Incident	FAA RI Rank (Note: The Federal Aviation Administration categorises runway incursions by seriousness as Accident, Category A (collision narrowly avoided), Category B (significant potential for collision), Category C (ample time or distance to avoid collision), Category D (no immediate safety consequences).)	NTSB Accident ID (links to reports)	Refs.
2023-01-09	Santa Barbara Municipal Airport, California	Air traffic control cleared a plane to land in the same location where a plane was already being inspected.	B	Not investigated by NTSB	
2023-01-12	Baltimore/Washington International Airport, Maryland	A plane crossed the wrong runway after air traffic control did not notice the pilot's misunderstanding.	B	Not investigated by NTSB	
2023-01-13	John F. Kennedy International Airport, New York	A Delta aircraft aborted its takeoff after an American Airlines plane crossed its path.	B	DCA23LA125 (summary, docket, prelim, final)	
2023-01-23	Daniel K. Inouye International Airport, Hawaii	A United Airlines aircraft crossed a runway into the path of a Kamaka Air small cargo plane.	C	DCA23LA133 (prelim, docket, final)	
2023-02-04	Austin-Bergstrom International Airport, Texas	A FedEx cargo plane and a Southwest jet came within 100 feet after both being cleared for the same runway.	A	DCA23FA149 (summary, docket, prelim,final)	
2023-02-16	Sarasota–Bradenton International Airport, Florida	Air Canada Rouge flight 1633 was cleared to take off on runway 14, and American Airlines flight 2172 was cleared to land on the same runway.	C	DCA23LA179 (prelim, docket, final)	
2023-02-22	Hollywood Burbank Airport, California	A landing Mesa Airlines took evasive action to avoid a SkyWest plane taking off.	un-assessed (Note: The FAA were still reviewing the incident as of 1 March 2023.)	DCA23LA185 (prelim, docket, final)	
2023-02-27	Boston Logan International Airport, Massachusetts	A landing JetBlue flight took evasive action to avoid a private jet that crossed the runway.	B	DCA23LA192 (docket, final)	
2023-03-07	Ronald Reagan Washington National Airport, Virginia	A Republic Airways plane crossed the path of a United Airlines plane that was cleared for take off.	D	Not investigated by NTSB	
2023-08-11	San Diego International Airport, California	A Cessna Citation aircraft overflew a Southwest aircraft by about 100 feet.	A	OPS23FA010 (prelim, final)	
2024-04-17	John F. Kennedy International Airport, New York	Swiss International Air Lines Flight LX17 was cleared to take off at runway 04L. Four other planes were cleared to cross the same runway. The Swiss jet aborted its takeoff.	C	DCA24FA164 (prelim)	
2024-04-18	Ronald Reagan Washington National Airport, Virginia	Southwest Airlines Flight 2937 was cleared to cross runway 4, while JetBlue Flight 1554 was starting its takeoff roll on the same runway.	C	Not investigated by NTSB	
2024-05-29	Ronald Reagan Washington National Airport, Virginia	American Airlines Flight 2134 aborted takeoff, because a Beechcraft Super King Air was cleared to land on an intersecting runway.	C	OPS24FA031 (prelim)	
2024-09-12	Nashville International Airport, Tennessee	Alaska Airlines Flight 369 was cleared for takeoff, while Southwest Airlines Flight 2029 was cleared to cross the same runway. Alaska 369 aborted takeoff.	C	DCA24FA300 (prelim)	
2024-10-11	San Diego International Airport, California	ATC cleared a Southwest plane to cross the runway, and at the same time, Southwest Flight 1478 was cleared to take off on the same runway. Southwest 1478 aborted takeoff.	C	Pending	
2025-02-25	Midway International Airport, Illinois	ATC cleared Southwest Airlines Flight 2504 to land on the runway while at the same time, a Bombardier Challenger 350 private jet crossed into the runway. Southwest 2504 aborted landing.	B	DCA25LA141 (prelim)	
2025-05-06	LaGuardia Airport, New York	An ATC cleared Republic Airways flight 4736 to take off on runway 13, while United Airlines flight 2657 was still taxiing on the same runway. Republic 4736 aborted their takeoff.	C	Pending	
2026-03-17	Newark Liberty International Airport, New Jersey	FedEx cargo flight FX721 (Boeing 777F) was cleared to land on Runway 29. Alaska Airlines flight AS294 (Boeing 737) was cleared to land on an intersecting runway, Runway 22L. The ATC instructed AS294 to go around. The Alaska aircraft overflew the FedEx aircraft about 300 to 325 feet (92 to 100 m) above it.	Pending	Pending	

== See also ==
- List of accidents and incidents involving commercial aircraft
