= Office of Dispute Resolution for Acquisition =

The Office of Dispute Resolution for Acquisition (ODRA) is an Article I court that was established by the Federal Aviation Administration (FAA) pursuant to a statutory grant of authority as an independent tribunal to hear and decide both award protests and contract disputes subject to the Acquisition Management System (AMS) between government contractors and the FAA.

== See also ==
- Federal Aviation Administration
- Acquisition Management System
- Contract Disputes Act of 1978
- Tucker Act
- Civilian Board of Contract Appeals
- United States Court of Federal Claims
- United States Court of Appeals for the Federal Circuit
