= Acquisition Management System =

The Acquisition Management System (AMS) provides policy and guidance on lifecycle acquisition management by the United States Federal Aviation Administration (FAA). The self-stated objectives of the AMS "are to increase the quality, reduce the time, manage the risk, and minimize the cost of delivering safe and secure services to the aviation community and flying public." The AMS applies to acquisitions by the FAA in place of the Federal Acquisition Regulation (FAR) and various other provisions of Federal acquisition law.

== History ==
The AMS became effective on April 1, 1996 in response to a Congressional mandate to the FAA:

IN GENERAL.—In consultation with such non-governmental experts in acquisition management systems as the Administrator may employ, and notwithstanding provisions of Federal acquisition law, the Administrator shall develop and implement an acquisition management system for the Administration that addresses the unique needs of the agency and, at a minimum, provides for—

(A) more timely and cost-effective acquisitions of equipment, services, property, and materials; and

(B) the resolution of bid protests and contract disputes related thereto, using consensual alternative dispute resolution techniques to the maximum extent practicable.

To assist the FAA, Congress also exempted the AMS from several otherwise-applicable provisions of Federal acquisition law:

(A) Title III of the Federal Property and Administrative Services Act of 1949 (41 U.S.C. 252–266).

(B) The Office of Federal Procurement Policy Act (41 U.S.C. 401 et seq.).

(C) The Federal Acquisition Streamlining Act of 1994 (Public Law 103–355), except for section 315 (41 U.S.C. 265). For the purpose of applying section 315 of that Act to the system, the term ‘‘executive agency’’ is deemed to refer to the Federal Aviation Administration.

(D) The Small Business Act (15 U.S.C. 631 et seq.), except that all reasonable opportunities to be awarded contracts shall be provided to small business concerns and small business concerns owned and controlled by socially and economically disadvantaged individuals.

(E) The Competition in Contracting Act.

(F) Subchapter V of chapter 35 of title 31, relating to the procurement protest system.

(G) The Federal Acquisition Regulation and any laws not listed in subparagraphs (A) through (F) providing authority to promulgate regulations in the Federal Acquisition Regulation.

The Transportation Security Administration (TSA) was previously subject to the AMS, but is instead now subject to the FAR and the Homeland Security Acquisition Regulation (HSAR) supplement.

== See also ==
- Federal Aviation Administration (FAA)
- Office of Dispute Resolution for Acquisition (ODRA)
- Government procurement in the United States
- Federal Acquisition Regulation (FAR)
