= Bryan Bedford =

American business executive

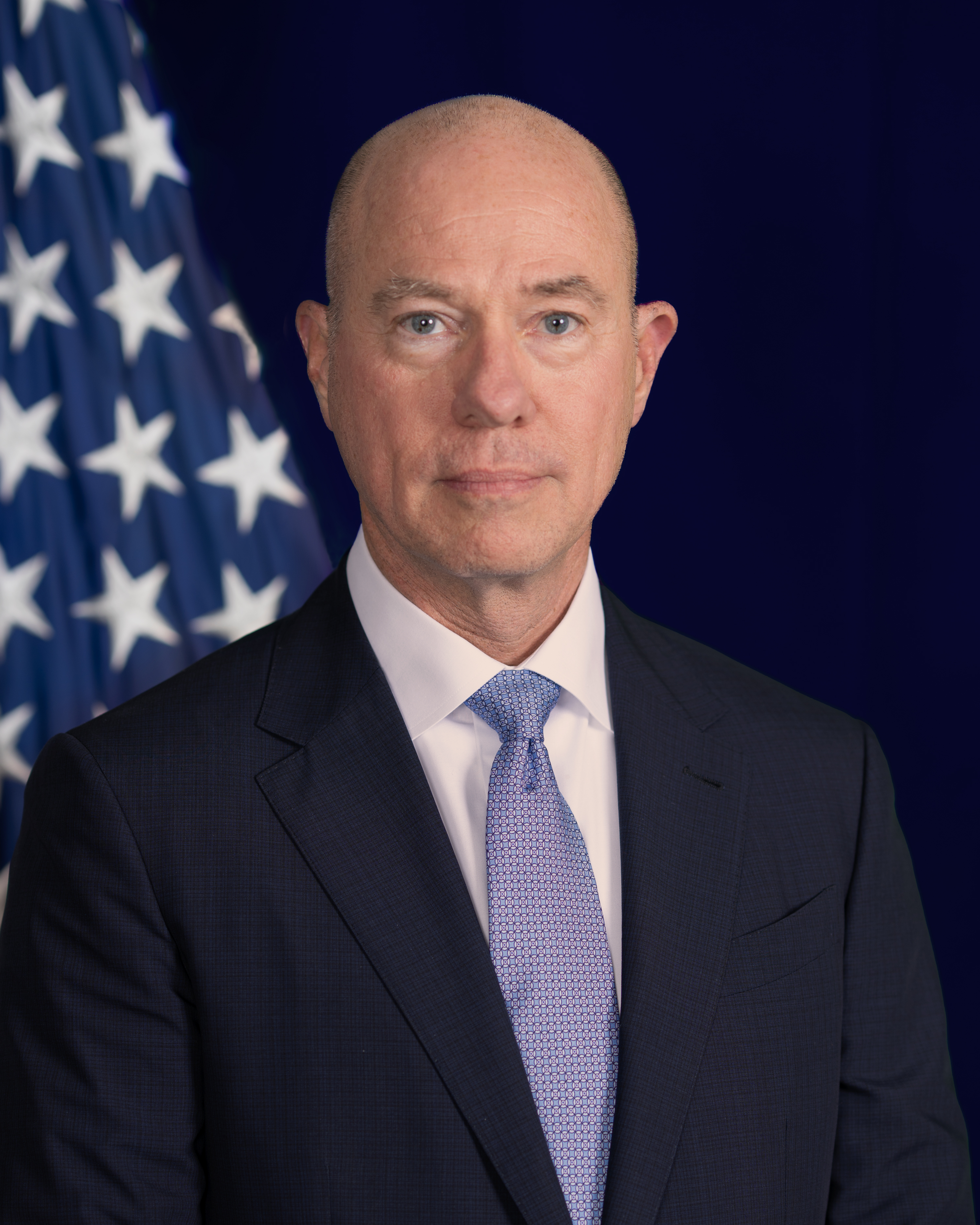
- Official Portrait, 2025

20th Administrator of the Federal Aviation Administration
- Incumbent
- Assumed office July 10, 2025
- President: Donald Trump
- Deputy: Chris Rocheleau; Liam McKenna (Acting)
- Preceded by: Michael Whitaker

Personal details
- Born: October 26, 1961 (age 65) Florida, U.S.
- Education: Florida State University (BS)

Bryan Keith Bedford (born October 26, 1961) is an American business executive who is the administrator of the Federal Aviation Administration (FAA). Before becoming administrator, Bedford served as the chief executive of Republic Airways Holdings from 1999 to 2025. In March 2025, President Donald Trump nominated Bedford to serve as FAA administrator. He was confirmed by the Senate on July 9, 2025.

== Early life and education ==
Bryan Keith Bedford was born on October 26, 1961, in Florida. Bedford graduated from Florida State University with a bachelor's degree.

== Career ==
=== Early career (1983–1995) ===
By 1990, Bedford was a financial controller for WestAir Commuter Airlines. Three years later, he had become the chief financial officer of Phoenix Airline Services. That year, he was named a principal of Chicago Express Airlines's regional service.

=== Mesaba Airlines (1995–1999) ===
In July 1995, Bedford became the president and chief executive of Mesaba Airlines.

=== Chautauqua Airlines (1999–2014) ===
In June 1999, Bedford became the president, chairman, and chief executive of Chautauqua Airlines. He led the airline after the September 11 attacks.

=== Republic Airways (1999–2025) ===
In July 1999, Bedford became the president and chief executive of Republic Airways Holdings. He became chairman in August 2001. In 2009, the company won a bankruptcy auction for Frontier Airlines. The following year, Bedford appeared on Undercover Boss (2010–2022) as the chief executive of Frontier, announcing that he would end a ten percent pay cut. According to The Wall Street Journal, his appearance drew scrutiny from the Federal Aviation Administration.

== Administrator of the Federal Aviation Administration ==
At the start of president Donald Trump's second administration in January 2025, Michael Whitaker, the administrator of the Federal Aviation Administration, resigned. In March, Bloomberg News reported that Bedford was a frontrunner to serve as Trump's nominee for the position. On March 17, Trump named Bedford as his nominee. On July 9, the US Senate voted 53-43 to confirm him to the position of FAA administrator.

In March 2026, Bedford announced updated safety protocols in response to the January 2025 mid-air crash at National Airport.

== Views ==
Bedford has opposed a rule that requires pilots to log 1,500 hours of flying before obtaining their Airline Transport Pilot certificate and being able to operate as a flight officer for a commercial FAA part 121 airline, lobbying against it before the House Committee on Transportation and Infrastructure in 2014. In 2022, the Federal Aviation Administration rejected Republic Airways Holdings's request to reduce required hours to 750 for pilots that trained at their in-house flight school. Bedford opposes the mandatory retirement age of 65 for pilots.

== Personal life ==
In August 1990, Bedford married Maria Richelle La Riche at Naples United Church of Christ in Naples, Florida. He is Catholic.

== Works cited ==
=== Articles ===
- "Bryan Bedford FAA Administrator". Federal Aviation Administration.
- Demirjian, Karoun. "Senate Confirms Bryan Bedford, Former Airline Executive, to Lead F.A.A". The New York Times.
- "Chicago Express Airlines to Begin Regional Service". The New York Times. July 23, 1983.
- Duncan, Ian (September 19, 2022). "FAA rejects proposal to cut qualifying flight time in half for pilots". The Washington Post.
- "Republic Wins Bid for Frontier, Beating Southwest". The New York Times. August 14, 2009.
- Saric, Ivana (March 17, 2025). "Trump nominates Republic Airways CEO as FAA administrator". Axios.
- "La Riche — Bedford". Naples Daily News. November 18, 1990.
- Schrader, Ann (October 18, 2010). "Frontier's "Undercover Boss" vows on show to roll back staff's pay cut". The Denver Post.
- Tangel, Andrew (June 6, 2025). "Trump's FAA Pick Once Played a Flight Attendant on TV. It Drew FAA Scrutiny". The Wall Street Journal.
- Treaster, Joseph (September 14, 2001). "Airlines Seek to Limit Lawsuits Over Attacks". The New York Times.
- Nunes, Ashley (April 19, 2018). "After the Southwest jet's emergency landing, will Congress change airline safety rules?". The Washington Post.
- Verspille, Allyson; Schlangenstein, Mary (March 12, 2025). "Republic Airways CEO Leads Candidates for FAA Top Post". Bloomberg News.
- Ali, Ayesha (July 9, 2025). "Senate confirms Bryan Bedford as FAA administrator". ABC News.

=== Documents ===
- "Bryan Keith Bedford in the Minnesota, U.S., Birth Index, 1935–2004" (Document). Birth Index.
- "Bryan K Bedford". Bloomberg News.
