= Randy Babbitt =

American pilot, former administrator of the Federal Aviation Administration

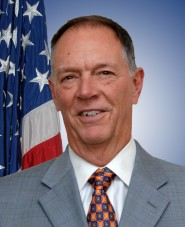
- Babbitt in 2009

16th Administrator of the Federal Aviation Administration
- In office June 1, 2009 – December 6, 2011
- President: Barack Obama
- Preceded by: Lynne Osmus (Acting)
- Succeeded by: Michael Huerta

Personal details
- Born: Jerome Randolph Babbitt; June 9, 1946 (age 80) Miami, Florida, U.S.

Jerome Randolph “Randy” Babbitt, (born June 9, 1946) is an American pilot and businessman who served as the 16th Administrator of the Federal Aviation Administration (FAA) from 2009 to 2011. In 2012 he was hired by Southwest Airlines as Vice President of Labor Relations, a position he retired from in 2016.

== Early life and education ==
Babbitt was born in 1946 in Miami and raised in Florida. He attended the University of Georgia and the University of Miami before becoming an airline pilot. He flew for Eastern Air Lines for 25 years.

Babbitt's father, "Slim" Babbitt, was also an airline pilot; he was one of the founding members of the Air Line Pilots Association (ALPA), which has become the largest airline pilot union in the United States and Canada.

== Career ==
Randy Babbitt served multiple roles within ALPA, including Executive Administrator from 1987 to 1990. In 1990 Babbitt was elected President of ALPA and served for eight years in that position.

After leaving ALPA, Babbitt formed an airline management and financial consulting firm in Reston, Virginia, Eclat Consulting. In September 2007 the personnel of this company were merged into the Aircraft Management division of Oliver Wyman.

=== Federal Aviation Administration ===
During the Clinton Administration, President Bill Clinton appointed Babbitt to the FAA Management Advisory Council. While in that capacity Babbitt sat on an independent review panel advising the government on aviation safety policy.

President Barack Obama formally nominated Babbitt to become the FAA Administrator on March 27, 2009. Babbitt's nomination was confirmed by the US Senate on May 21, 2009; he was sworn in on June 1. Babbitt succeeded Robert Sturgell and Lynne Osmus, who had both served as Acting FAA Administrator since Marion Blakey's term expired in 2007. Babbitt's FAA term was five years.

==== Drunk driving arrest and resignation ====
Babbitt was arrested December 3, 2011, in Fairfax City, Virginia, and charged with driving under the influence of alcohol. Babbitt was about 9 miles from his Reston, Virginia home when an officer alleged that he drove on the wrong side of the road. Fairfax police issued a press release December 5, in accordance with a department policy of announcing arrests of public officials. Obama administration officials did not learn about the arrest until they saw the press release.

The day the press release was published, Babbitt requested a leave of absence, which Transportation Secretary Ray LaHood granted. Michael Huerta, Babbitt's deputy, immediately took Babbitt's responsibilities. Babbitt resigned as FAA administrator the next day, December 6.

Babbitt's drunk driving charge was dismissed May 10, 2012, after a Fairfax City judge found that the arresting officer had no good reason, only a "mere hunch," for pulling Babbitt over. A video of the arrest played in court showed that Babbitt had not, in fact, driven in the wrong direction. Babbitt's lawyer challenged the methodology of the alcohol breath test. An initial test showed a .07% blood-alcohol level, which is below the legal limit. The officer then tested Babbitt again until he got a .08% reading—something police are not allowed to do. After the dismissal, Babbitt said he planned to work in aviation consulting.

=== Later career ===
He was later hired in October 2012 as Southwest Airlines' Vice President of Labor Relations. On August 23, 2016, he announced his retirement from Southwest.

Trade union offices
Preceded by Henry A. Duffy	President of the Air Line Pilots' Association; 1991–1998	Succeeded by Duane E. Woerth
Political offices
Preceded by Lynne Osmus; Acting	16th Administrator of the Federal Aviation Administration; 2009–2011	Succeeded by Michael Huerta
