= Polly Trottenberg =

American politician (born 1964)

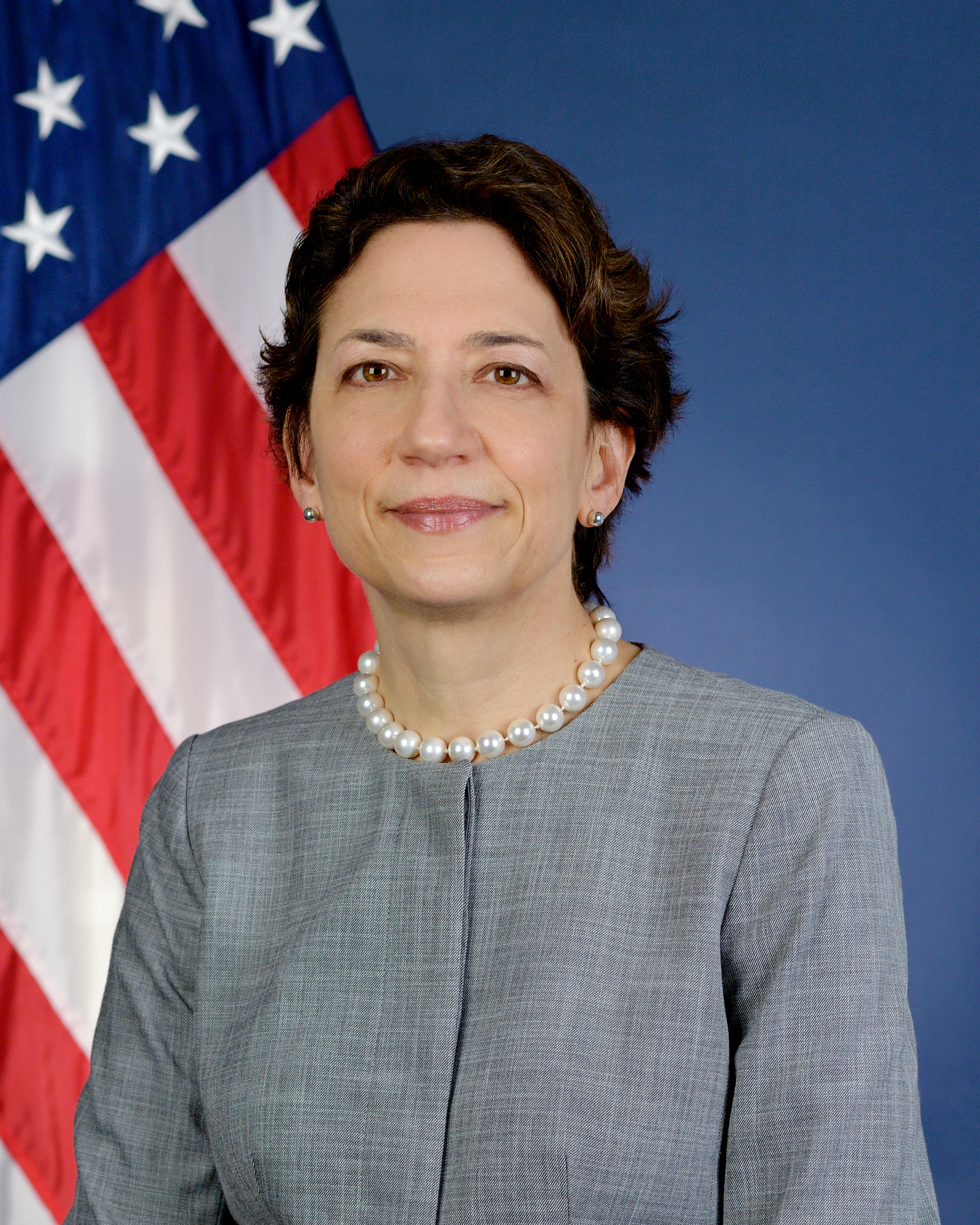
- Official portrait, 2021

13th United States Deputy Secretary of Transportation
- In office April 14, 2021 – January 20, 2025
- President: Joe Biden
- Preceded by: Jeffrey A. Rosen
- Succeeded by: Steven G. Bradbury

Administrator of the Federal Aviation Administration
- Acting
- In office June 9, 2023 – October 27, 2023
- President: Joe Biden
- Preceded by: Billy Nolen (acting)
- Succeeded by: Michael Whitaker

Commissioner of the New York City Department of Transportation
- In office January 27, 2014 – December 11, 2020
- Mayor: Bill de Blasio
- Preceded by: Janette Sadik-Khan
- Succeeded by: Margaret Forgione (Acting)

Personal details
- Born: March 16, 1964 (age 62) Boston, Massachusetts, U.S.
- Party: Democratic
- Spouse: Mark Zuckerman
- Education: Barnard College (BA); Harvard University (MPP)

Polly Ellen Trottenberg (born March 16, 1964) is dean of New York University's Wagner Graduate School of Public Service. She was previously an American government official who served as Deputy Secretary of Transportation under Pete Buttigieg from 2021 to 2025, and as the acting administrator of the Federal Aviation Administration from June 2023 to October 2023. She previously served as commissioner of the New York City Department of Transportation from 2014 to 2020.

== Early life and education ==
Trottenberg was born in Boston and grew up in Pelham, New York, and Cambridge, Massachusetts. She earned a Bachelor of Arts degree in history from Barnard College in 1986 and a Master of Public Policy from the John F. Kennedy School of Government.

== Career ==
=== Early career ===
During the Obama administration, Trottenberg was the Under Secretary of Transportation for Policy, helping develop the Transportation Investment Generating Economic Recovery grant program.

Trottenberg also served as a transportation policy adviser for Senators Chuck Schumer, Barbara Boxer, and Daniel Patrick Moynihan, in addition to holding positions with the Port Authority of New York and New Jersey and the nonprofit Building America's Future.

=== NYC DOT ===
Polly Trottenberg was appointed by New York City Mayor Bill de Blasio on December 31, 2013, to replace Janette Sadik-Khan as Commissioner of the New York City Department of Transportation. Trottenberg was sworn in on January 27, 2014.

Trottenberg was also a board member of the Metropolitan Transportation Authority, having been confirmed for a 10-year term on June 23, 2014. Seen as a voice of "sanity" on the board, she resigned from the position on June 3, 2019. Trottenberg also served as the chair of TRANSCOM, a coalition of 16 transportation-related agencies in the New York metropolitan area, from 2015 to 2019.

=== Deputy Secretary of Transportation ===
In November 2020, Trottenberg was named a volunteer member of the Joe Biden presidential transition Agency Review Team to support transition efforts related to the United States Department of Transportation. On January 18, 2021, it was announced that Trottenberg would serve as United States Deputy Secretary of Transportation in the incoming Biden administration. On February 13, 2021, her nomination was formally submitted to the Senate for confirmation. On April 13, 2021, Trottenberg was confirmed in an 82–15 vote. She was sworn into office on April 14, 2021.

Trottenberg was named acting administrator of the Federal Aviation Administration by President Biden on June 8, 2023.

=== New York University ===
On July 10, 2025, New York University (NYU) announced that Trottenberg would become dean of NYU’s Wagner Graduate School of Public Service and a Global Distinguished Professor at NYU, assuming these duties on August 1, 2025.

== Personal life ==
Trottenberg is Jewish. She lives on Capitol Hill with husband Mark Zuckerman, president of The Century Foundation.

Government offices
Preceded by Janette Sadik-Khan	Commissioner of the New York City Department of Transportation; 2014–2020	Succeeded by Margaret Forgione; Acting
Political offices
Preceded by Steven G. Bradbury; Acting	United States Deputy Secretary of Transportation; 2021–2025	Succeeded by Steven G. Bradbury
