= Aviation Safety Knowledge Management Environment =

The Aviation Safety Knowledge Management Environment (ASKME) is a software suite for certifying new aircraft and modified aircraft. It was created for the Federal Aviation Administration (FAA) Aircraft Certification Service (AIR).

ASKME was established to provide a comprehensive automation environment for critical safety business processes for the Office of Aviation Safety. It consists of 18 separate projects that were installed between 2008 and 2017. Segment 1 went from 2008 to 2012 and Segment 2 from 2013 to 2017.

The ASKME projects provide regulators with electronic storage and retrieval of FAA technical documentation, and feedback from previous certifications that involved aircraft design and manufacturing safety issues. allowing easier access and sharing.

ASKME captures key safety-related data for rulemaking and policy development, airworthiness directives, design certification, production/ manufacturing certification and airworthiness certification. This helps regulators approve operating certificates, design or modification of aircraft and meet aircraft safety conditions; designee management, evaluation and audit, external inquiries, enforcement, continued operational safety management, and international coordination.

== Deliverables ==
=== Segment 1 IT application deliverables ===
- Electronic File Service (EFS)
- Work Tracking Software – Risk Based Resource Targeting (WTS-RBRT)
- Monitor Safety Related Data (MSRD) (3 related applications)
  - Monitor Safety Analyze Data (MSRD-MSAD)
  - Oversee System Performance – Internal (MSRD-OSPi)
  - Oversee System Performance – External (MSRD-OSPe)
- Designee Supervision / Past Performance (DS/PP)
- Assimilate Lessons Learned (ALL)
- Work Tracking Software – Work Activity Tracking (WTS-WAT)
- Engineering Design Approval (EDA)
- DTE-DDS Technical Evaluations – Aircraft Certification Audit Info System (ACAIS)

=== Segment 2 IT application deliverables ===
- Electronic File Service (EFS) – Production Support and Historical Scanning
- Work Tracking Software – Budget Management (WTS-BMgmt)
- Airworthiness Directives Development (ADD)
- Airworthiness Certifications (4 related applications):
  - Standard Airworthiness Certifications (StdAC)
  - Special Airworthiness Certifications (SpclAC)
  - Special Flight Authorizations (SFA)
  - Certification of Imported/Exported Products (CI/EP)
- Compliance and Enforcement Actions (CEA)

=== Alignment of program to FAA strategic goal, outcome, and performance metric ===
- FAA Strategic Goal 1 – Next Level of Safety
- FAA Outcome 1 – No accident-related fatalities occur on commercial service aircraft in the US
- FAA Performance Metric 1 – Reduce the commercial air carrier fatalities per 100 million persons on board by 24 percent over 9-year period (2010–2018). No more than 6.2 in FY 2018
