= Stephen Dickson (executive) =

American aviator and government official (born 1957)

Steve Dickson
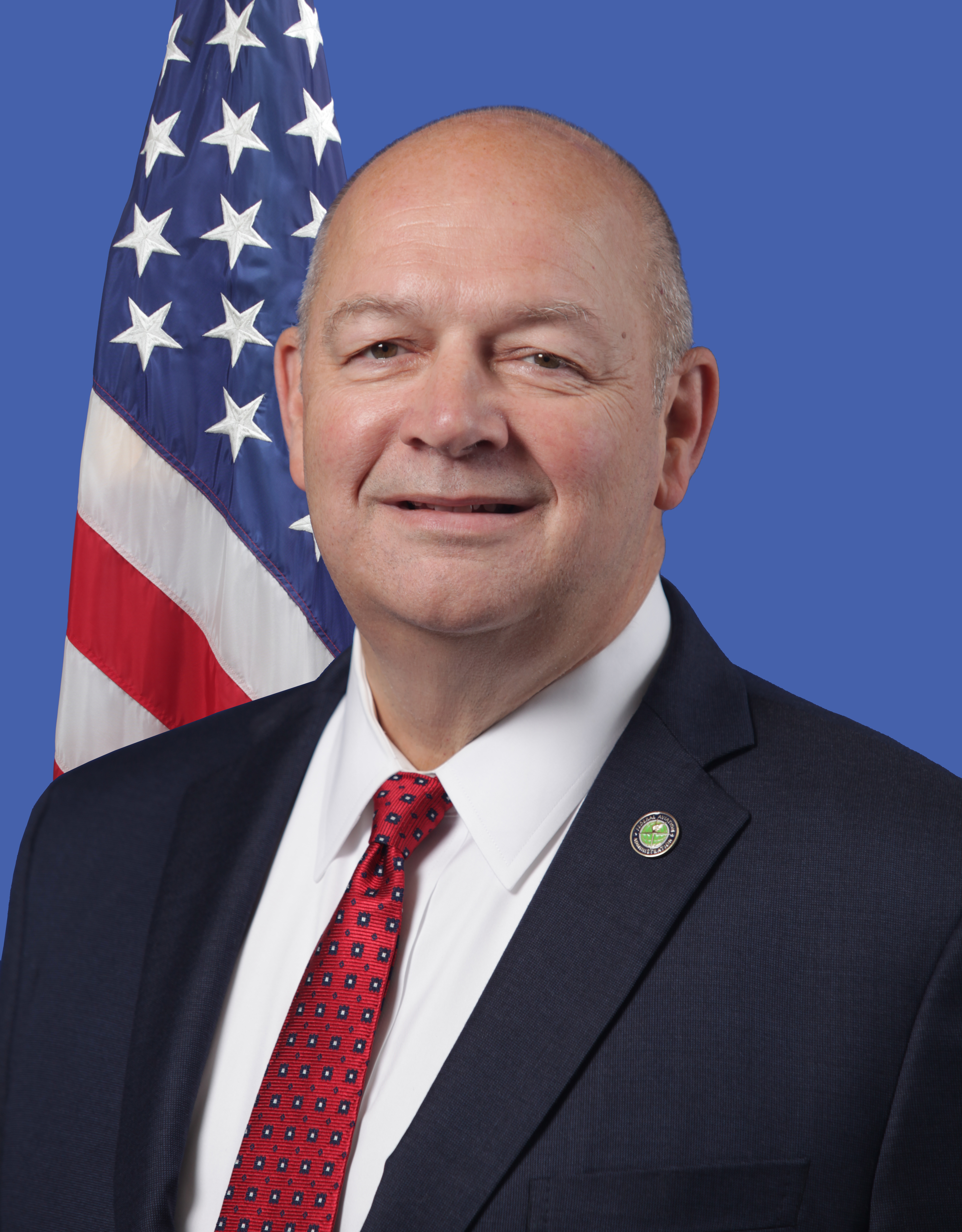
- Dickson in 2015

18th Administrator of the Federal Aviation Administration
- In office August 12, 2019 – March 31, 2022
- President: Donald Trump; Joe Biden
- Deputy: Daniel Elwell
- Preceded by: Michael Huerta
- Succeeded by: Billy Nolen (acting); Michael Whitaker

Personal details
- Born: Stephen Marshall Dickson; September 3, 1957 (age 68) Lake Charles, Louisiana, U.S.
- Party: Republican
- Education: United States Air Force Academy (BS); Georgia State University (JD)

Stephen Marshall Dickson (born September 3, 1957) is an American former Air Force pilot and Delta Air Lines executive who served as the 18th Administrator of the Federal Aviation Administration from August 2019 to March 2022.

Prior to Dickson's appointment to the Federal Aviation Administration, he spent 27 years at Delta, first as a pilot and later overseeing pilots as the senior vice president of flight operations until he retired. In March 2019, President Donald Trump nominated Dickson to be Administrator of the Federal Aviation Administration and the Chairman of the Air Traffic Services Committee. On July 27, the United States Senate confirmed Dickson in a 52–40 vote. He was sworn in as Administrator by Transportation Secretary Elaine Chao on August 12, 2019.

== Early life and education ==
Dickson was born in Lake Charles, Louisiana. A former United States Air Force Officer and F-15 fighter pilot, Dickson is a Distinguished Graduate of the Class of 1979 at the United States Air Force Academy, as well as a graduate of the Georgia State University College of Law, magna cum laude.

== Career ==
Before moving to the Federal Aviation Administration, Stephen Dickson retired from service as the Senior Vice President-Flight Operations for Delta Air Lines. In this role, he was responsible for the safety and operational performance of Delta's global flight operations, as well as pilot training, crew resources, crew scheduling, and regulatory compliance. He also flew in line operations as an Airbus A320 captain, and previously flew the Boeing 727, 737, 757, and 767 during his career. Dickson is a strong advocate for commercial aviation safety and improvements to the US National Airspace System, having served as chairman of several industry stakeholder groups and Federal advisory committees.

After retiring from Delta, Dickson was nominated by President Trump to be the Administrator of the Federal Aviation Administration prior to 15 May. He was confirmed in the Senate Commerce Committee by a 14–12 vote on July 10, 2019, to lead an outfit which had been without a permanent head since January 2018. He was confirmed by a 52–40 vote of the full Senate on July 24, and replaced Acting Administrator Daniel Elwell in the midst of the Boeing 737 MAX groundings. Senator Maria Cantwell led the opposition to Dickson's appointment because of his retaliation against a whistleblower at Delta.

=== Administrator of the Federal Aviation Administration ===
Dickson's first action as FAA Administrator was inviting pilots for simulator tests of the Boeing 737 MAX, which was announced on August 22, 2019. On September 18 the same year, Dickson announced that he would only re-certify the MAX once he flew the aircraft himself to test the new software. He completed the test flight on September 30, 2020, saying that the aircraft responded well, although the FAA was not yet ready to re-certify it.

In November 2019, the FAA revoked Boeing's authority to issue airworthiness certificates for each new individual 737 MAX aircraft. This authority had previously been held under the Organization Designation Authorization. The FAA reiterated that the aircraft was not ready for re-certification.

On February 16, 2022, Dickson announced his resignation as FAA Administrator, effective March 31, 2022.

== Criticism ==
In 2020 a Labor Department judge ruled that while serving as Vice President of Delta Air Lines Dickson was complicit in synthesizing and weaponizing claims of psychological unfitness against a pilot at the company who had brought concerns to their Safety Department's attention. Dickson and vice president of flight operations Jim Graham retaliated against the pilot's whistleblower claims by having a doctor falsely diagnose the pilot with bipolar disorder to force her out of the company. Delta later launched an unsuccessful appeal and was ordered to reinstate the pilot and pay her $500,000.
