= FAA Order 8110.37 =

Handbook for Designated Engineering Representatives

Designated Engineering Representative (DER) Handbook
- FAA Publication
- Abbreviation: FAA Order 8100.37
- Status: Active
- First published: 28 September 1979
- Latest version: F 2017
- Organization: Federal Aviation Administration AIR-600
- Domain: Airworthiness certification
- Website: Order 8110.37F; Form 8110-3

FAA Order 8110.37(), Designated Engineering Representative (DER) Handbook, is a handbook of procedures, technical guidelines, limitations of authority, tools, and resources for Designated Engineering Representatives (DERs), who are appointees of the Federal Aviation Administration. Both DERs and the FAA offices managing them have individual and mutual roles and responsibilities in the certifications of safety of aircraft and aviation systems. This handbook provides a better understanding of these roles. Although intended for the roles of DERs, this order may be useful to ODA engineering Unit Members, who are effectively DERs managed by aviation manufacturers rather than by the FAA.

Under 14 CFR, the FAA holds authority and responsibility for certifying airworthiness of all aircraft flying within the U.S. Airspace. However, such approval requires comprehension of volumes of complex technical data by a large staff of engineers. Such staffing is beyond the capacity of the agency, so the FAA recognizes particularly qualified private persons to approve or recommend approval of technical data on behalf of the FAA. These persons are recognized as Designated Engineering Representatives and are employed by manufactures or consultancies — they are not FAA employees.

Considered the "Bible" for DERs fulfilling their airworthiness certification functions, the FAA created 8110.37() "to give FAA managing offices and the DERs a better understanding of their individual and mutual responsibilities."

Conforming to the procedures of Order 8110.37() is the only protection provided to DERs; a DER's designation may otherwise be terminated for "any reason considered appropriate by the Administrator." The Order defines that DERs may request reviews of such termination by the appointing Aircraft Certification Office (ACO) Manager and further second-level review by the Manager of the Directorate.

== Certification Activities of a DER ==
8110.37() defines the certification activities of a DER. These defined activities include the following:

=== Type Design Certification ===
The FAA typically delegates DERs the authority to conduct examinations, testing, and inspections necessary to issue a type design certificate and to issue a type certificate when conformity is found, all following the same procedures an FAA engineer must follow in those activities.

=== Changes in Type Design ===
Having obtained a Type Design approval, a manufacturer may need to change the approved design. 14 CFR § 21.93 classifies type design changes as either major or minor. It is the manufacturer's responsibility to first determine and notify the FAA whether a proposed type change is major or minor, subject to FAA review. Major changes require FAA review and approval of new design and test data to ensure that the changed designs meet federal requirements, in which the FAA relies on DERs as much as for the original design approvals.

== FAA Form 8110-3 ==
One task of DERs is to review technical data for compliance with FAA airworthiness requirements and governing regulations. Where DERs find compliance, they certify that compliance by completing FAA Form 8110-3, Statement of Compliance with Airworthiness Standards for the specific configuration of the technical data they reviewed. Form 8110-3 is the only FAA form that any DER may sign under their designated authority. Order 8110.37() provides instructions for completing Form 8110-3, and includes examples of completed Forms.

The FAA also maintains an electronically fillable Form 8110-3 in its Document Library for download. The form includes instructions for editing the form itself, referring DERs to Order 8110.37() for instructions and examples for recording their findings of compliance with the form.

== See also ==
- FAA Order 8100.8, Designee Management Handbook is FAA policy for selecting, appointing, training, and managing DERs. In contrast to Order 8110.37, which instructs both DERs and FAA staff, Order 8100.8 only instructs FAA staff.
