= FAA Order 8100.8 =

Designee Management Handbook
- FAA Publication
- Abbreviation: FAA Order 8100.8
- Status: Active
- First published: 20 November 1998
- Latest version: D 2011
- Organization: Federal Aviation Administration AIR-100/200
- Domain: Aviation safety
- Website: Order 8100.8D

FAA Order 8100.8(), Designee Management Handbook, establishes "policy and procedures for the selection, appointment, orientation, training, oversight, renewal tracking, and termination of certain representatives of the Administrator" of the Federal Aviation Administration. In particular, it is a resource for individuals interested in becoming a Designated Engineering Representative (DER).

DERs are not employees of the FAA. FAA employees must resign from the FAA before obtaining DER certification.

Subject to FAA Notice 8000.372 Manufacturing Designee Management System Implementation (2014), all Designated Airworthiness Representatives for Manufacturing (DAR-Fs) and Designated Manufacturing Inspection Representatives (DMIRs) are subject to the policy in FAA Order 8000.95, Designee Management Policy. Order 8100.8 is no longer applicable to these two designations.

FAA Order 8100.8 Revision D cancels FAA Order 8130.33C, Designated Airworthiness Representatives: Amateur-built and Light-Sport Aircraft Certification Functions, by adding a section to provide guidance and policy for selection and appointment of DARs to the functions of light-sport aircraft airworthiness certification.

== See also ==
- FAA Order 8110.37, Designated Engineering Representative (DER) Handbook, working procedures for DERs and FAA engineering field office staff
