= Phil Washington =

American governmental administrator (born 1958)

Phillip A. Washington
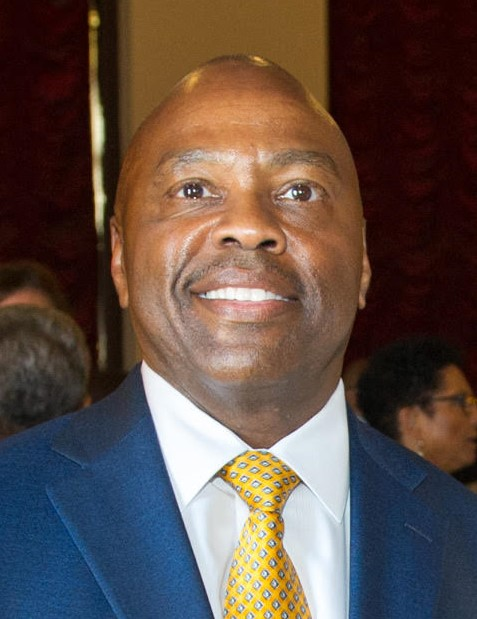
- Born: 1958 (age 67–68); Chicago, Illinois, U.S.
- Education: Columbia College Chicago (BBA); Webster University (MM)

CEO of Denver International Airport
- Incumbent
- Assumed office 19 July 2021
- Preceded by: Kim Day

CEO of the Los Angeles County Metropolitan Transportation Authority
- In office May 2015 – May 2021
- Preceded by: Art Leahy
- Succeeded by: Stephanie Wiggins

CEO of the Regional Transportation District
- In office December 2009 – May 2015
- Preceded by: Clarence W. Marsella
- Succeeded by: Dave Genova

Military service
- Allegiance: United States
- Branch/service: United States Army
- Years of service: 1976–2000
- Rank: Command Sergeant Major
- Awards: Defense Superior Service Medal

Phillip A. Washington (born 1958) was an American governmental administrator who was the CEO of Denver International Airport, previous CEO of the Los Angeles Metro, and head of president Joe Biden's transportation transition team. He retired in August 2026.

In July 2022 Biden nominated Washington as administrator of the Federal Aviation Administration, but Congress delayed taking action to confirm him over concerns about his lack of expertise in the area and Washington withdrew from the nomination in March 2023.

== Early life and education ==
Washington was born in the South Side of Chicago and lived in the Altgeld Gardens Homes. When he was 17 years old, Washington was expelled from high school and decided that the best way to get away from the place was to enlist in the United States Army.

After twenty-four years, he had risen to the rank of Command Sergeant Major, being stationed in Fort Carson, Colorado. During his time in the military, he got a Bachelor of Business Administration degree at Columbia College Chicago and a Master of Management from Webster University. In 2000, he left the army and applied for assistant general manager of administration at the Regional Transportation District (RTD). Cal Marsella, the CEO, gave him the job.

== Career ==
=== Regional Transportation District ===
Washington began his work as assistant general manager in 2000. In June 2009, Washington was named as the interim chief after Marsella stepped down. In December 2009, the RTD announced that Washington would become the next CEO after the board voted in favor of his appointment.

=== Los Angeles Metro ===
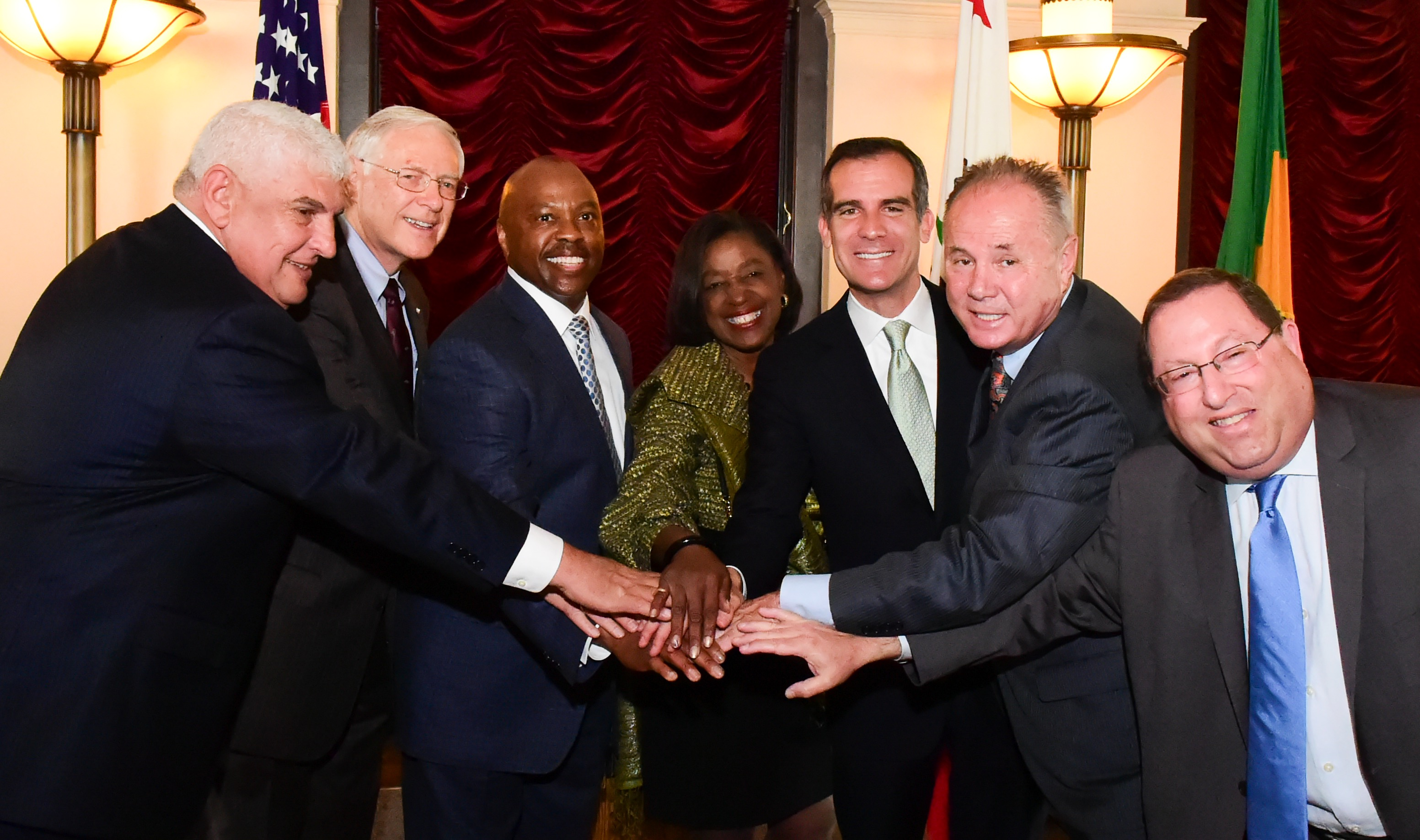
Los Angeles mayor Eric Garcetti and Metro board members welcome Washington.

In May 2015, Los Angeles mayor Eric Garcetti announced that Washington would become the new CEO of the Los Angeles County Metropolitan Transportation Authority, replacing Art Leahy. In 2018, Washington was honored at the Los Angeles Sustainability Coalition Annual Awards Dinner for his role in the Measure M expansion.

In November 2020, Washington was named Team Lead for the Joe Biden presidential transition Agency Review Team for the United States Department of Transportation. In February 2021, after informing the Metro Board not to renew or extend his contract, Washington announced he would be retiring from the post that May.

=== Denver International Airport ===
On June 7, 2021, Denver mayor Michael Hancock nominated Washington to become the CEO of Denver International Airport, taking over the position from CEO Kim Day who was retiring after 13 years. A few days after, the Los Angeles County Sheriff's Department had a criminal investigation at LACMTA's offices related to a criminal investigation into Washington, which came after a Metro whistleblower's claims of corruption. The investigation was of Metro's sexual harassment hotline, which was found to cost more than $8,000 per call after "multiple no-bid contracts to run the service were awarded to Peace Over Violence, a charity led by a close friend and campaign donor of L.A. County Supervisor and Metro board member Sheila Kuehl." Washington maintained that he was innocent and that the complaint was from a disgruntled employee, with Hancock supporting him. The topic of the investigation was not discussed when the Denver City Council unanimously voted to approve Washington as the new CEO.

=== Federal Aviation Administration nomination ===
On July 6, 2022, President Joe Biden announced that he had nominated Washington to lead the Federal Aviation Administration. His nomination stalled in the United States Senate, with some criticizing Biden's choice of Washington, who had been mentioned in a criminal probe in Los Angeles. On March 1, 2023, Washington faced the United States Senate Committee on Commerce, Science, and Transportation, where he was criticized by Senator Ted Cruz, saying that he was not qualified and did "not have any experience in aviation safety." He also faced a challenge due to his military status, as the statute does not allow for any retired military member to be eligible for leadership. It was announced that a Senate vote on his confirmation would take place on March 22, 2023, before the vote was delayed by Senator Kyrsten Sinema after she raised some questions about him. On March 25, 2023, he withdrew from the nomination.
