= Flight Standards District Office =

Field office of the United States Federal Aviation Administration

A Flight Standards District Office (FSDO (/ˈfɪzˌdoʊ/ FIZ-doh)) is a locally affiliated field office of the United States Federal Aviation Administration.

There are 78 such offices nationwide as of November 2015 physically located in every state except for Delaware, New Hampshire, Rhode Island, and Vermont. Delaware is served by Philadelphia, Rhode Island is served by Boston, and Vermont and New Hampshire are served by Portland, Maine.

== Purpose ==
The FSDOs serve as local representatives of the FAA. Each office reports to one of nine Regional FAA offices and perform a variety of compliance and enforcement actions. Such items include:

- Low-flying aircraft reporting
- Accident Reporting
- Air carrier certification and operations
- Aircraft maintenance
- Aircraft operational issues
- Aircraft permits
- Airmen certification (licensing) for pilots, mechanics, repairmen, dispatchers, and parachute riggers
- Certification and modification issues
- Enforcement of Airmen & Aircraft Regulations
