= Victoria Wassmer =

American civil servant

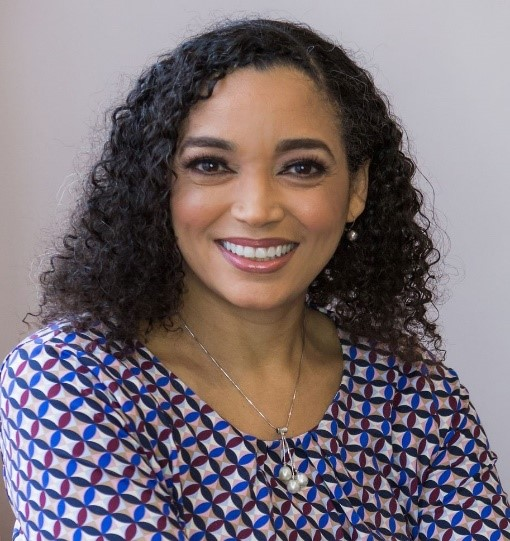

Personal details
- Children: 2
- Education: Harvard University (MA); Bryn Mawr College (BA)

Victoria Marie Baecher Wassmer is an American government official who serves as the Chief Financial Officer and an assistant secretary of transportation for budget and programs within the Department of Transportation. She previously served as Deputy Assistant Secretary for Finance and Budget within the department as well as in various roles at the Federal Aviation Administration (FAA).

== Early life and education ==
Wassmer graduated from Harvard University with a master's degree in public policy, as well as obtaining a bachelor's degree in political science from Bryn Mawr College.

== Career ==
During her time at the FAA, Wassmer served in roles such as the acting Deputy Administrator, Chief Nextgen Officer, and Chief Financial Officer. Wassmer served as the vice president of administration and finance at the Millennium Challenge Corporation from 2010 to 2011. She also worked as a research assistant with the Development Bank of South Africa.

=== Obama nominations ===
Wassmer was nominated by President Barack Obama to several positions in his administration, including the Environmental Protection Agency and Department of Energy. These nominations ultimately stalled in the Senate.

==== EPA nomination ====
In late 2013, President Obama nominated Wassmer to be the Chief Financial Officer of the EPA. Hearings on her nomination were held before the Senate's Environment Committee on December 17, 2013. The nomination expired at the end of the year and was returned to President Obama on January 3, 2014.

President Obama re-sent Wassmer's nomination on January 6, 2014. On February 6, 2014, the committee favorably reported Wassmer's nomination to the Senate floor; she was not placed on the executive calendar until February 27, 2014. Her nomination ultimately stalled and was returned to President Obama on December 17, 2014.

==== Energy Department nomination ====
On July 23, 2015, President Obama nominated Wassmer to be an undersecretary of energy within the Department of Energy after being unable to get her confirmed for a role in the EPA. Hearings were held by the Senate's Energy Committee on her nomination on October 20, 2015. The committee favorably reported her nomination to the Senate floor on November 19, 2015. Her nomination stalled until near the end of President Obama's term, when Wassmer's nomination was returned on January 3, 2017.

=== Biden administration ===
On March 26, 2021, President Joe Biden nominated Wassmer to be the chief financial officer and assistant secretary of transportation for budget and programs at the Department of Transportation. The Senate Commerce Committee held hearings on Wassmer's nomination on September 22, 2021. On October 20, 2021, the committee reported her nomination favorably. Wassmer's initial nomination expired at the end of the year and was returned to President Biden on January 3, 2022.

President Biden renominated Wassmer the next day. On February 2, 2022, the committee again reported her nomination favorably to the Senate floor. The entire Senate confirmed Wassmer via voice vote on May 12, 2022. She assumed office on May 16, 2022.

== Personal life ==
Wassmer lives in Washington DC with her husband, their two children, and her mother.

== See also ==
- List of Department of Transportation appointments by Joe Biden
