= Aviation Innovation, Reform, and Reauthorization Act =

Aviation Innovation, Reform, and Reauthorization (AIRR) Act
- Long title: To transfer operation of air traffic services currently provided by the Federal Aviation Administration to a separate not-for-profit corporate entity, to reauthorize and streamline programs of the Federal Aviation Administration, and for other purposes.
- Announced in: the 114th United States Congress
- Sponsored by: U.S. Rep. Bill Shuster (R-PA)
- Number of co-sponsors: 5

Legislative history
- Introduced in the House as H.R. 4441 by Bill Shuster (R–PA) on February 3, 2016; Committee consideration by United States House Committee on Transportation and Infrastructure

The Aviation Innovation, Reform, and Reauthorization (AIRR) Act (H.R. 4441) was a bill introduced on February 3, 2016, in the 114th Congress (2015-2016) by Congressman Bill Shuster (R-PA) and Frank LoBiondo (R-NJ). Among other things, the bill would have privatized the American air traffic control (ATC) system. The bill would also have reauthorized the Federal Aviation Administration (FAA) through 2019.

The bill passed the House House Transportation and Infrastructure Committee but died before reaching a full House floor vote.

Because bills do not carry over into the next Congress, Shuster reintroduced an updated version of the bill in the 115th Congress on June 22, 2017. The subsequent bill is H.R. 2997, the 21st Century Aviation Innovation, Reform, and Reauthorization (AIRR) Act. his bill also has never reached a floor vote.

In the spring of 2016, the Senate passed and the President signed into law a separate piece of legislation which was a short term reauthorization of the FAA. This reauthorization expires in September 2017. In 2017, House and Senate Transportation Committees began to hold hearings on the status of the airline sector (such as infrastructure and safety) in pursuit of a multi-year authorization. A priority for long-term authorization from House Transportation and Infrastructure Committee Chairman Shuster is the privatization of air traffic controllers. In the short-term reauthorization passed in 2016, the privatization component—a major component of Shuster's H.R. 4441—was not included.

== Background ==
In the United States, the aviation industry helps drive the national economy. The industry employs millions of people and accounts for over 5% of GDP. The American aviation system is the busiest in the world and continues growing. With the size and scope of the American aviation system, the air traffic control system "still utilizes World War II-era radar technology.” According to the House Transportation Committee, “We have an antiquated, inefficient air traffic control system. Bureaucracy hinders our manufacturers’ ability to compete and threatens to drive jobs in new technologies – like drones – overseas. And Americans are growing weary of delays and hassles associated with flying.”

=== Air traffic control system reform ===
The United States’ Air Traffic Organization (ATO) is a division of the Federal Aviation Administration and a unit of the U.S. Department of Transportation. The ATO is the operational arm of the FAA responsible for safe and efficient air navigation. It oversees 17 percent of the world's airspace: the entire United States plus large parts of the Atlantic, Pacific, and Gulf of Mexico.

The idea to spin off air traffic control from a government agency to an independent, non-governmental body is modeled after Canada's reforms from two decades ago. Under the reform model, a board of stakeholders would oversee the body and would charge user fees instead of aviation taxes. Canada's system is regarded as one of the most efficient and advanced air navigation service providers in the world. Air traffic control costs 26 percent more in the United States than it does in Canada.

The FAA's “NextGen” program is replacing aging equipment. ATC reform would replace the actual system, how it is organized, and who oversees it.

An Inspector General report released in January 2017 restarted the debate over moving ATC from FAA to a private corporation governed by the airline industry. Congress must renew the short-term FAA authorization that expires on September 30, 2017, and this issue will be part of the debate. Several events in the past have highlighted need for reform. For example, in September 2014 arson brought down a regional facility in Chicago, which disrupted airline flights for several weeks. In October 2015 the radar room in the tower at Austin-Bergstrom airport flooded.

According to UPI, “The Federal Aviation Administration has long maintained control over air traffic control at the nation's airports due to the sensitive nature of the work and the government's desire to prevent private airlines from competing for space, potentially complicating travel time and creating a safety hazard.”

In February 2017, the Eno Center for Transportation released the report Time for Reform: Delivering Modern Air Traffic Control. The report recommends moving ATC from FAA to either a government corporation or an independent nonprofit organization. The report also proposes changing the funding structure to user fees rather than mix of taxes and general Treasury funds. According to the Eno Center, “The report finds that spinning-off air traffic control would create a more stable system that the current one, which is subject to political uncertainty. A separate system would not depend on annual budget appropriations, nor subject to budget sequesters and government shutdowns. In the long run this will make running ATC cheaper, providing benefits for the economy and the travelling public.”

=== History and opposition ===
The air traffic control program is "an issue with enormous economic consequences that impacts every American regardless of how often they fly."

The National Business Aviation Association (NBAA) is a Washington-based organization lobbies on behalf of the interests of private and corporate jet owners. Drew Johnson, a senior fellow at the Taxpayers Protection Alliance, wrote in an opinion editorial in The Huffington Post that the NBAA "is the reason why the nation’s air traffic control system is so antiquated and incapable of keeping pace with the modern demands of air travel that it accounts for nearly half of all flight delays."

In 1993, President Bill Clinton was the first to suggest major reform of the ATC system. He recommended the creation of an independent entity to manage the nation's ATC system. To date, major editorial boards (including the Wall Street Journal and Washington Post) have endorsed the idea. President Donald Trump, House Speaker Paul Ryan, and the Chairman of the House Transportation and Infrastructure Committee have all publicly supported it, as well.

Additionally, "Former Secretaries of Transportation and FAA leaders from the Clinton, Bush, and Obama administration – including all three former heads of the U.S. air traffic control system – support ATC reform,” according to the House Transportation and Infrastructure Committee.

"Even though there are far more general aviation aircraft, including corporate and private jet, than commercial planes using America’s airways, corporate jet owners pay only about 1 percent into the ATC system."

== Legislative details ==
=== Privatization of FAA activities and air traffic control ===
The AIRR Act would remove air traffic control from the federal government and place it into a “federally-chartered, not-for-profit corporation called the ATC Corporation” on October 1, 2019. This move would transfer all operational control over air traffic services from FAA to the new corporation. FAA employees, property, and facilities would be transferred to ATC, as well as operational control of FAA air traffic services.

When Congressman Shuster announced the introduction of the Aviation Innovation, Reform, and Reauthorization (AIRR) Act, he said that the ATC system is incredibly inefficient and will just get worse as the number of people flying goes up and the FAA falls further behind in modernization.

=== Other provisions ===
In addition to privatizing ATC, the bill has a number of other provisions:

- It keeps the FAA's role as the country's main aviation safety regulator.
- It creates:
  - A Safety Oversight and Certification Advisory Committee within the U.S. Department of Transportation (DOT)
  - An FAA Task Force on Flight Standards Reform
  - A Regional Consistency Communications Board
  - A Designated Agency Safety and Health Officer within DOT
  - An Unmanned Aircraft Systems (UAS) Integration Office within the FAA
  - A UAS detection systems pilot program
- It directs:
  - The FAA to create a safety workforce training strategy
  - The DOT to take actions to “promote U.S. aerospace standards, products, and services abroad”
  - The DOT to create a plan to quicken the pace of integrating civil drones into the national airspace system
  - The FAA to submit to Congress a strategic cybersecurity plan
- It reauthorizes the essential air service program and small community air service development program for fiscal years 2016 to 2022.

== Cosponsors ==
In addition to the original cosponsor (Frank LoBiondo), the bill was cosponsored by four additional Members of Congress:

- Mimi Walters (R-CA)
- Jeff Denham (R-CA)
- Richard Hanna (R-NY)
- Pete Sessions (R-TX)

== Legislative history ==
The following shows the legislative history of the Aviation Innovation, Reform, and Reauthorization (AIRR) Act:

- 2/3/16 – The bill was introduced in the U.S. House of Representatives and referred to the House Committee on Transportation and Infrastructure
- 2/4/16 – The committee referred it to the Subcommittee on Aviation.
- 2/11/16 – The committee considered and amended (“marked up”) the bill.
- 2/11/16 – The bill was ordered to be reported favorably from the committee by a vote of 32–26.

The Airport and Airway Extension Act of 2016 (H.R.4721) was a separate bill introduced by Congressman Shuster on March 10, 2016. It did not include the privatization of air traffic controllers due to opposition in the Senate. On March 30, 2016, after being signed by President Obama it became Public Law 114–141. The bill was a short-term reauthorization of the FAA that expires on September 30, 2017.

== Support and opposition ==
=== Support ===
The bill has substantial bipartisan support in Congress and in the stakeholder community (such as airlines). Many airlines have said that privatizing ATC would be more efficient, cheaper and reduce flight delays.

Airlines for America, the trade association representing airlines, supports the privatization of air traffic control. The group wrote, “The flying and shipping public deserve modernized air traffic control infrastructure. Unnecessary flight delays that are often the result of outdated, WWII-era technology and procedures cost the United States an estimated $25 billion in 2016 alone. Benefits of modernization will include: enhanced safety, reduced delays, fuel savings, reduced emissions, increased capacity and greater operational efficiency.”

=== Opposition ===
Members of the House and Senate Appropriations committees oppose the proposal because it would reduce their own oversight authority. The same is true for some members of the House Ways and Means Committee; it would take away their role in setting aviation taxes and fees.

On February 15, 2016, the New York Times’s editorial board published an article, “Don’t Privatize Air Traffic Control.”

Most of the general aviation(GA) community strongly oppose privatizing air traffic control. Citing a similar switch Canada made in 1996(NavCanada), the high fees associated with a private air traffic control in Canada resulted in a significant decline in the GA community. Flying in Canada with anything other than a major airline has become a privilege of the rich.

== 115th Congress (2017-2018) ==
Although all bills officially die at the end of a two-year congressional term, Shuster has kept the issue alive when the 115th Congress began. In January 2017 at the start of the 115th Congress, Shuster began to fight again for a new version of his bill and the privatization of ATC.

On February 9, 2017, President Donald Trump met with airline and airport executives at the White House to discuss transportation issues. Trump told the attendees that he supports privatizing the ATC system. Trump called the current system too expensive and “totally out of whack” during the meeting. “Trump pledged he would review regulations on the airline industry and work to provide better infrastructure at the nation's airports.”

Also on February 9, the House Transportation and Infrastructure Committee approved a bill that would again shift the entire ATC system to a stand-alone, nonprofit corporation. The bill would reauthorize the FAA for three years. According to The Wall Street Journal, the bill faces “an uncertain fate in the Senate”. Under the bill, the FAA would retain final say over all safety matters.

Additionally, the House Transportation and Infrastructure Committee held a series of hearings about FAA reform. In February 2017, the Subcommittee on Aviation held a hearing entitled “Building a 21st Century Infrastructure for America: State of American Airports.” That was the subcommittee's second hearing examining aviation issues in anticipation of the 2017 FAA reauthorization bill.

=== The 21st Century AIRR Act (2017) ===
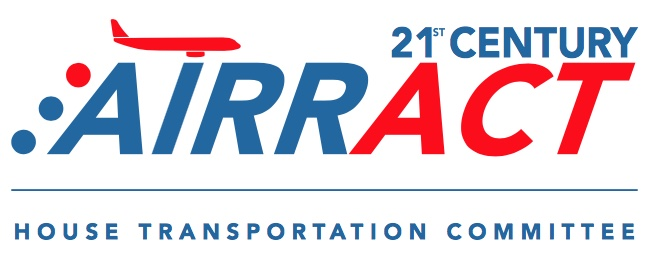
The official logo of The 21st Century AIRR Act published by the House Transportation and Infrastructure Committee (U.S. Government)

On June 22, 2017, Shuster reintroduced an updated version of the bill, H.R. 2997, the 21st Century AIRR Act. On June 27, the House Transportation and Infrastructure Committee held a markup (a process where a bill is debated, amended, and voted on in a congressional committee) on the bill and it passed by a vote of 32 to 25.

H.R. 2997 would create a federally chartered, fully independent, not-for-profit organization whose mission would be to operate and modernize the country's air traffic control (ATC) services. The organization would be the service provider for ATC services instead of the FAA. Essentially, the legislation would separate the service provider for air traffic control from the FAA (its regulating agency). The reason to separate the two is to allow the air traffic control system, under the newly created oversight organization, to be free from "the government’s inherent bureaucratic inertia, Washington politics, and funding uncertainty.” The new service provider (the not-for-profit organization created by the bill) would be run like a business. It would have a CEO who would be accountable to a board of directors, which would be made up of people nominated from each significant sub-industry of aviation (general aviation, cargo aviation, commercial, etc.). The bill would transition the ATC system to the new service provider over a three-year transition period. The FAA would remain responsible for the safety of the country's sovereign airspace and would be able to regulate the service provider "at arm’s length as in most other modern countries worldwide.” The Congressional Budget Office initially estimated the cost of this new bureaucracy at $20 billion over the first ten years. This figure was subsequently revised upward to $98.5 billion. The bill did not have adequate support in Congress, and Representative Bill Shuster has stated that he will no longer pursue it.

== See also ==
- Air traffic controller
- Air Traffic Organization
- Federal Aviation Administration
- United States Department of Transportation
