= SAFO =

Information tool by FAA

In aviation, a SAFO (Safety Alert for Operators) is an information tool that alerts, educates, and makes recommendations to the aviation community .

== See also ==
- Aviation Safety Network
