= Michael Whitaker (government official) =

American lawyer (born 1961)

Mike Whitaker
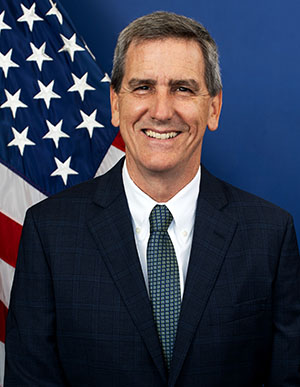
- Whitaker in 2023

19th Administrator of the Federal Aviation Administration
- In office October 27, 2023 – January 20, 2025
- President: Joe Biden
- Deputy: Katie Thomson
- Preceded by: Stephen Dickson
- Succeeded by: Bryan Bedford

Personal details
- Born: June 21, 1961 (age 64) San Antonio, Texas, U.S.
- Education: University of Louisville (BA); Georgetown University (JD)

Michael Gordon Whitaker (born June 21, 1961) is an American lawyer who served as the 19th administrator of the Federal Aviation Administration (FAA) from 2023 to 2025. He previously served as chief operating officer of Supernal under the Hyundai Motor Company from 2020 to 2023, as principal of the aviation consultancy Whitaker Air Space from 2016 to 2020, and as deputy administrator of FAA from 2013 to 2016.

== Education ==
Whitaker studied at the University of Louisville in Kentucky from 1979 to 1982 and from 1983 to 1984, with one year study-abroad at the Universite de Montpellier in France from 1982 to 1983. He received a Bachelor of Arts degree with majors in political science and French from the University of Louisville in 1984. He studied at the Georgetown University Law Center from 1984 to 1987, and received a Juris Doctor degree in 1987.

He won a Louis C. Kesselman Endowment Award in 1982 from the Department of Political Science at the University of Louisville as an undergraduate student.

== Career ==
Whitaker began his aviation career as a litigator, then as assistant general counsel of international and regulatory affairs at Trans World Airlines (TWA). He spent 15 years at United Airlines in a variety of roles as director, vice president and senior vice president. His portfolio at the airline included commercial alliances and joint ventures, international and regulatory affairs, and strategic counsel to the chairman and chief executive officer on international matters. Whitaker served as Group CEO of InterGlobe Enterprises. There, he oversaw strategy and operations for four affiliate travel companies.

Whitaker served as deputy administrator at the Federal Aviation Administration from 2013 to 2016. There, he collaborated with industry and government to drive the transition of the nation’s air traffic control system from radar to a satellite-enabled surveillance technology (ADS-B). After leaving the FAA, he served as principal of the aviation consultancy Whitaker Air Space from 2016 to 2020.

From 2020 to 2023, he served as the chief operating officer of Supernal, a Hyundai Motor Group company designing an electric advanced air mobility (AAM) vehicle. Whitaker is a private pilot. He serves on the board of the Flight Safety Foundation. On September 7, 2023, U.S. president Joe Biden nominated him to serve as the administrator of the FAA. On October 24, 2023, the United States Senate confirmed his nomination by a 98–0 vote. Whitaker was sworn in by Secretary Pete Buttigieg on October 27, 2023. On January 20, 2025, he resigned as FAA administrator after announcing his intention to resign in December 2024.
