= Federal Aviation Administration =

U.S. government agency regulating civil aviation

- Seal of the Federal Aviation Administration

- Flag of the FAA

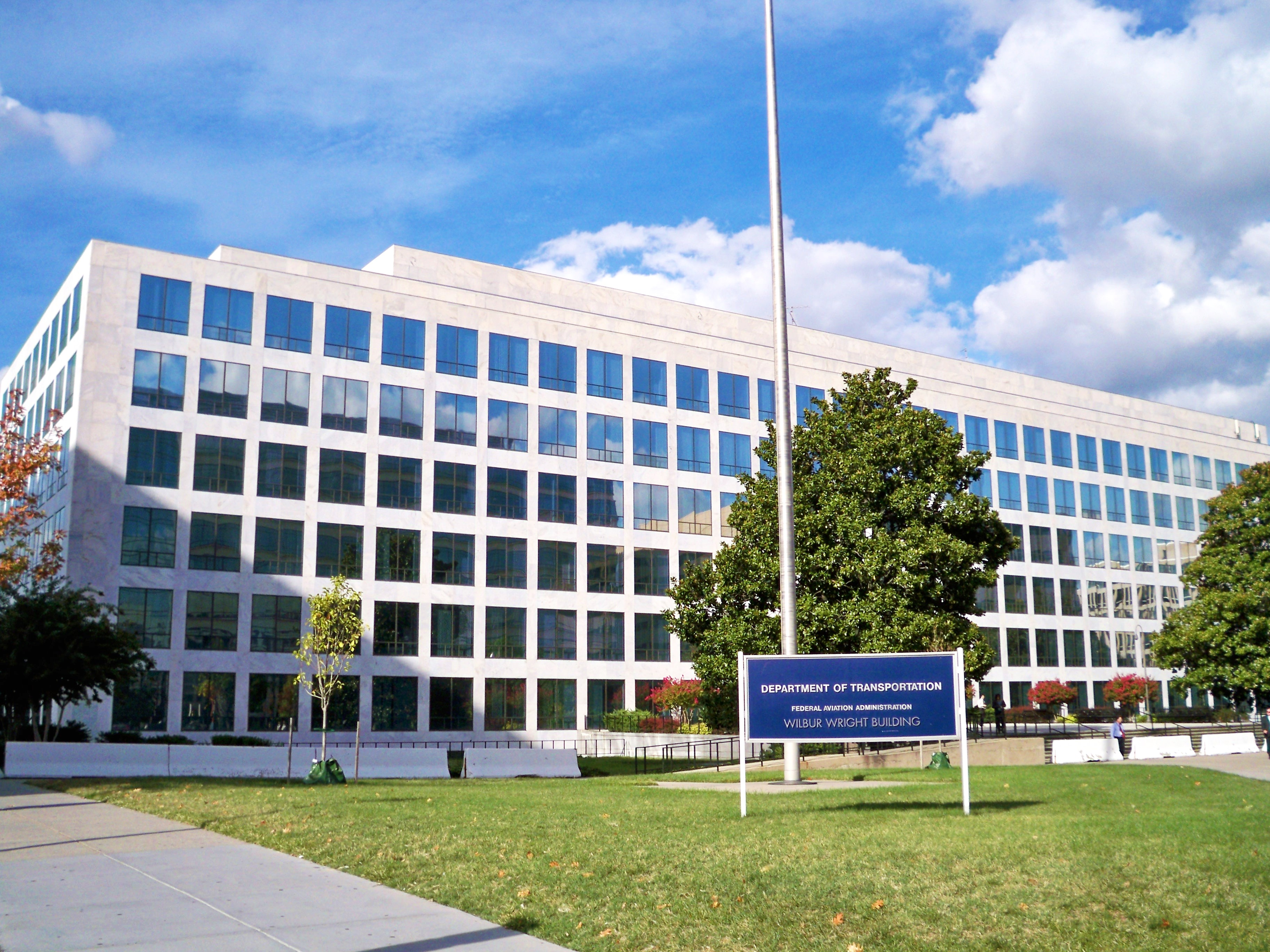
- FAA headquarters in Washington, D.C.

Agency overview
- Formed: August 23, 1958; 68 years ago
- Preceding agency: Civil Aeronautics Administration
- Jurisdiction: U.S. federal government
- Headquarters: Orville Wright Federal Building 800 Independence Avenue SW Washington, D.C., U.S. 20591; 38°53′13″N 77°1′22″W
- Annual budget: US$19.807 billion (FY2024)
- Agency executives: Bryan Bedford, Administrator; Liam McKenna, Acting Deputy Administrator
- Parent agency: U.S. Department of Transportation
- Key document: Federal Aviation Act of 1958
- Website: faa.gov

The Federal Aviation Administration (FAA) is a U.S. federal government agency within the U.S. Department of Transportation that regulates civil aviation in the United States and surrounding international waters. Its powers include air traffic control, certification of personnel and aircraft, setting standards for airports, and protection of U.S. assets during the launch or re-entry of commercial space vehicles. Powers over neighboring international waters were delegated to the FAA by authority of the International Civil Aviation Organization.

The FAA was created in August 1958 as the Federal Aviation Agency, replacing the Civil Aeronautics Administration (CAA). In 1967, the FAA became part of the newly formed U.S. Department of Transportation and was renamed the Federal Aviation Administration.

== Major functions ==
The FAA's roles include:

- Regulating U.S. commercial space transportation
- Regulating air navigation facilities' geometric and flight inspection standards
- Encouraging and developing civil aeronautics, including new aviation technology
- Issuing, suspending, or revoking pilot certificates
- Regulating civil aviation to promote transportation safety in the United States, especially through local offices called Flight Standards District Offices
- Developing and operating a system of air traffic control and navigation for both civil and military aircraft
- Researching and developing the National Airspace System and civil aeronautics
- Developing and carrying out programs to control aircraft noise and other environmental effects of civil aviation

As part of its Next Generation Air Transportation System (NextGen) initiative, the FAA is also modernizing navigation and procedures for both fixed-wing and rotorcraft operations. The agency has overseen the large-scale deployment of performance-based navigation (PBN) routes and procedures, including RNAV and RNP approaches supported by satellite-based augmentation systems, and has worked with industry safety teams and user groups to apply these tools at smaller airports, heliports and in low-altitude corridors used by air ambulance and other helicopter operators.

== Organizations ==
The FAA operates five "lines of business". Their functions are:

- Air Traffic Organization (ATO): provides air navigation service within the National Airspace System. In ATO, employees operate air traffic control facilities comprising Airport Traffic Control Towers (ATCT), Terminal Radar Approach Control Facilities (TRACONs), and Air Route Traffic Control Centers (ARTCC).
- Aviation Safety (AVS): responsible for aeronautical certification of personnel and aircraft, including pilots, airlines, and mechanics.
- Airports (ARP): plans and develops the national airport system; oversees standards for airport safety, inspection, design, construction, and operation. The office awards $3.5 billion annually in grants for airport planning and development.
- Office of Commercial Space Transportation (AST): ensures protection of U.S. assets during the launch or reentry of commercial space vehicles.
- Security and Hazardous Materials Safety (ASH): responsible for risk reduction of terrorism and other crimes and for investigations, materials safety, infrastructure protection, and personnel security.

== Regions and Aeronautical Center operations ==
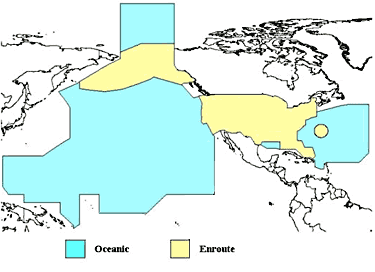
Map depicting the FAA's air traffic control jurisdictions over all U.S. territories and some international waters, including (in yellow) regions where the U.S. provides enroute air traffic control services over land, (in blue) regions where the U.S. provides oceanic air traffic control services over international waters, including Hawaii, several U.S. island territories, and some small, foreign island nations and territories

The FAA is headquartered in Washington, D.C., and also operates the William J. Hughes Technical Center near Atlantic City, New Jersey, for support and research, and the Mike Monroney Aeronautical Center in Oklahoma City, Oklahoma, for training. The FAA has nine regional administrative offices:

- Alaskan Region – Anchorage, Alaska
- Northwest Mountain – Seattle, Washington
- Western Pacific – Los Angeles, California
- Southwest – Fort Worth, Texas
- Central – Kansas City, Missouri
- Great Lakes – Chicago, Illinois
- Southern – Atlanta, Georgia
- Eastern – New York, New York
- New England – Boston, Massachusetts

== History ==
=== Background ===
The Air Commerce Act of May 20, 1926, is the cornerstone of the U.S. federal government's regulation of civil aviation. This landmark legislation was passed at the urging of the aviation industry, whose leaders believed the airplane could not reach its full commercial potential without federal action to improve and maintain safety standards. The Act charged the Secretary of Commerce with fostering air commerce, issuing and enforcing air traffic rules, licensing pilots, certifying aircraft, establishing airways, and operating and maintaining aids to air navigation. The newly created Aeronautics Branch, operating under the Department of Commerce assumed primary responsibility for aviation oversight.

In fulfilling its civil aviation responsibilities, the U.S. Department of Commerce initially concentrated on such functions as safety regulations and the certification of pilots and aircraft. It took over the building and operation of the nation's system of lighted airways, a task initiated by the Post Office Department. The Department of Commerce improved aeronautical radio communications—before the founding of the Federal Communications Commission in 1934, which handles most such matters today—and introduced radio beacons as an effective aid to air navigation.

The Aeronautics Branch was renamed the Bureau of Air Commerce in 1934 to reflect its enhanced status within the Department. As commercial flying increased, the Bureau encouraged a group of airlines to establish the first three centers for providing air traffic control (ATC) along the airways. In 1936, the Bureau itself took over the centers and began to expand the ATC system. The pioneer air traffic controllers used maps, blackboards, and mental calculations to ensure the safe separation of aircraft traveling along designated routes between cities.

In 1938, the Civil Aeronautics Act transferred the federal civil aviation responsibilities from the Commerce Department to a new independent agency, the Civil Aeronautics Authority. The legislation also expanded the government's role by giving the CAA the authority and the power to regulate airline fares and to determine the routes that air carriers would serve.

President Franklin D. Roosevelt split the authority into two agencies in 1940: the Civil Aeronautics Administration (CAA) and the Civil Aeronautics Board (CAB). CAA was responsible for ATC, airman and aircraft certification, safety enforcement, and airway development. CAB was entrusted with safety regulation, accident investigation, and economic regulation of the airlines. The CAA was part of the Department of Commerce. The CAB was an independent federal agency.

On the eve of America's entry into World War II, CAA began to extend its ATC responsibilities to takeoff and landing operations at airports. This expanded role eventually became permanent after the war. The application of radar to ATC helped controllers in their drive to keep abreast of the postwar boom in commercial air transportation. In 1946, meanwhile, Congress gave CAA the added task of administering the federal-aid airport program, the first peacetime program of financial assistance aimed exclusively at development of the nation's civil airports.

=== Formation ===
The approaching era of jet travel (and a series of midair collisions—most notably the 1956 Grand Canyon mid-air collision) prompted passage of the Federal Aviation Act of 1958. This legislation passed the CAA's functions to a new independent body, the Federal Aviation Agency. The act also transferred air safety regulation from the CAB to the FAA, and gave it sole responsibility for a joint civil-military system of air navigation and air traffic control. The FAA's first administrator, Elwood R. Quesada, was a former Air Force general and adviser to President Eisenhower.

The same year witnessed the birth of the National Aeronautics and Space Administration (NASA), which was created in response to the Soviet Union (USSR) launch of the first manmade satellite. NASA assumed NACA's aeronautical research role.

=== 1960s reorganization ===
In 1967, a new U.S. Department of Transportation (DOT) combined major federal responsibilities for air and surface transport. The Federal Aviation Agency's name changed to the Federal Aviation Administration as it became one of several agencies (e.g., Federal Highway Administration, Federal Railroad Administration, the Coast Guard, and the Saint Lawrence Seaway Commission) within DOT. The FAA administrator no longer reported directly to the president, but instead to the Secretary of Transportation. New programs and budget requests would have to be approved by DOT, which would then include these requests in the overall budget and submit it to the president.

At the same time, a new National Transportation Safety Board took over the Civil Aeronautics Board's (CAB) role of investigating and determining the causes of transportation accidents and making recommendations to the secretary of transportation. CAB was merged into DOT with its responsibilities limited to the regulation of commercial airline routes and fares.

The FAA gradually assumed additional functions. The hijacking epidemic of the 1960s had already brought the agency into the field of civil aviation security. In response to the hijackings on September 11, 2001, this responsibility is now primarily taken by the Department of Homeland Security. The FAA became more involved with the environmental aspects of aviation in 1968 when it received the power to set aircraft noise standards. Legislation in 1970 gave the agency management of a new airport aid program and certain added responsibilities for airport safety. During the 1960s and 1970s, the FAA also started to regulate high altitude (over 500 feet) kite and balloon flying.

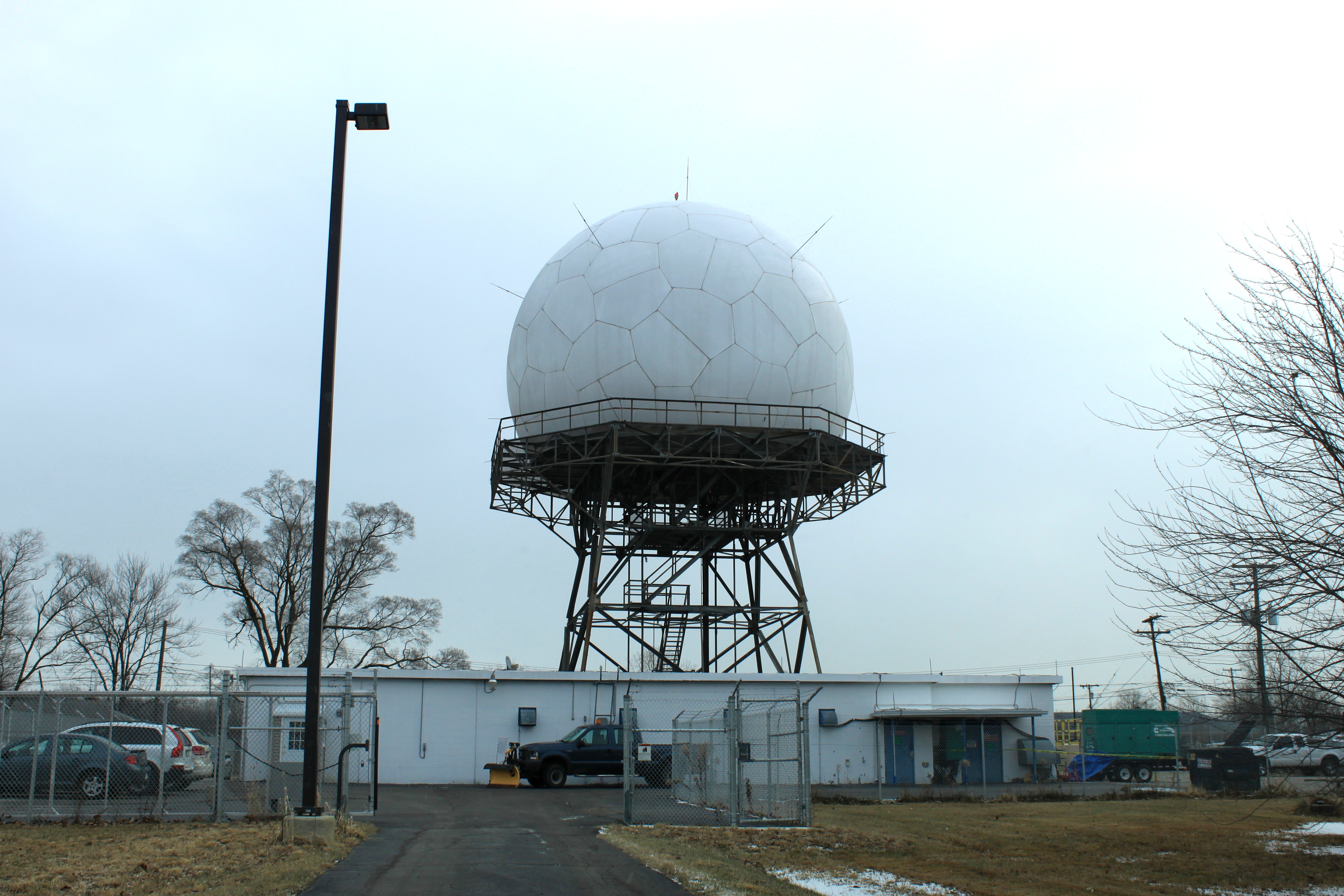
FAA Joint Surveillance Site radar, Canton, Michigan

=== 1970s and deregulation ===
By the mid-1970s, the agency had achieved a semi-automated air traffic control system using both radar and computer technology. This system required enhancement to keep pace with air traffic growth, however, especially after the Airline Deregulation Act of 1978 phased out the CAB's economic regulation of the airlines. A nationwide strike by the air traffic controllers union in 1981 forced temporary flight restrictions but failed to shut down the airspace system. During the following year, the agency unveiled a new plan for further automating its air traffic control facilities, but progress proved disappointing. In 1994, the FAA shifted to a more step-by-step approach that has provided controllers with advanced equipment.

In 1979, Congress authorized the FAA to work with major commercial airports to define noise pollution contours and investigate the feasibility of noise mitigation by residential retrofit programs. Throughout the 1980s, these charters were implemented.

In the 1990s, satellite technology received increased emphasis in the FAA's development programs as a means to improvements in communications, navigation, and airspace management. In 1995, the agency assumed responsibility for safety oversight of commercial space transportation, a function begun eleven years before by an office within DOT headquarters. The agency was responsible for the decision to ground flights after the September 11 attacks.

=== 21st century ===
In December 2000, an organization within the FAA called the Air Traffic Organization, (ATO) was set up by presidential executive order. This became the air navigation service provider for the airspace of the United States and for the New York (Atlantic) and Oakland (Pacific) oceanic areas. It is a full member of the Civil Air Navigation Services Organisation.

The FAA issues a number of awards to holders of its certificates. Among these are demonstrated proficiencies as an aviation mechanic (the AMT Awards), a flight instructor (Gold Seal certification), a 50-year aviator (Wright Brothers Master Pilot Award), a 50-year mechanic (Charles Taylor Master Mechanic Award) or as a proficient pilot. The latter, the FAA "WINGS Program", provides a lifetime series of grouped proficiency activities at three levels (Basic, Advanced, and Master) for pilots who have undergone several hours of ground and flight training since their last WINGS award, or "Phase". The FAA encourages volunteerism in the promotion of aviation safety. The FAA Safety Team, or FAASTeam, works with Volunteers at several levels and promotes safety education and outreach nationwide.

On March 18, 2008, the FAA ordered its inspectors to reconfirm that airlines are complying with federal rules after revelations that Southwest Airlines flew dozens of aircraft without certain mandatory inspections. The FAA exercises surprise Red Team drills on national airports annually.

On October 31, 2013, after outcry from media outlets, including heavy criticism from Nick Bilton of The New York Times, the FAA announced it will allow airlines to expand the passengers use of portable electronic devices during all phases of flight, but mobile phone calls would still be prohibited (and use of cellular networks during any point when aircraft doors are closed remains prohibited to-date). Implementation initially varied among airlines. The FAA expected many carriers to show that their planes allow passengers to safely use their devices in airplane mode, gate-to-gate, by the end of 2013. Devices must be held or put in the seat-back pocket during the actual takeoff and landing. Mobile phones must be in airplane mode or with mobile service disabled, with no signal bars displayed, and cannot be used for voice communications due to Federal Communications Commission regulations that prohibit any airborne calls using mobile phones. From a technological standpoint, cellular service would not work in-flight because of the rapid speed of the airborne aircraft: mobile phones cannot switch fast enough between cellular towers at an aircraft's high speed. However, the ban is due to potential radio interference with aircraft avionics. If an air carrier provides Wi-Fi service during flight, passengers may use it. Short-range Bluetooth accessories, like wireless keyboards, can also be used.

In July 2014, in the wake of the downing of Malaysia Airlines Flight 17, the FAA suspended flights by U.S. airlines to Ben Gurion Airport during the 2014 Israel–Gaza conflict for 24 hours. The ban was extended for a further 24 hours but was lifted about six hours later.

The FAA Reauthorization Act of 2018 gives the FAA one year to establish minimum pitch, width and length for airplane seats, to ensure they are safe for passengers.

As of 2018, the FAA plans to replace the "FAA Telecommunications Infrastructure" (FTI) program with the "FAA Enterprise Network Services" (FENS) program.

The first FAA licensed orbital human space flight took place on November 15, 2020, carried out by SpaceX on behalf of NASA.

Due to a systems outage on January 11, 2023, the FAA issued a ground stop for less than two hours. More than 10,000 flights were affected.

On November 13, 2026, the FAA issued a nationwide ground stop citing "extraordinary circumstances and for reasons of safety". According to FlightAware, almost 7,000 flights were cancelled or delayed.

It is the third national ground stop in United States history, the other two being the September 11 attacks and 2023 FAA system outage.

On 13 November, the FAA lifted a nationwide ground stop that had been imposed due to a communications failure at air traffic control centers, which caused significant disruption at airports across the United States. US airspace was reopened at 8:15 p.m. ET, although flight operations were expected to restart gradually. Almost 10,000 flights were canceled, resulting in many passengers being stranded. Duffy and Mullin held a meeting with Trump to address the situation.

=== History of FAA administrators ===
The administrator is appointed for a five-year term.

No.	Portrait	Administrator	Term start date	End date	Refs.
1		Elwood Richard Quesada	November 1, 1958	January 20, 1961	
2		Najeeb Halaby	March 3, 1961	July 1, 1965	
3		William F. McKee	July 1, 1965	July 31, 1968	
4		John H. Shaffer	March 24, 1969	March 14, 1973	
5		Alexander Butterfield	March 14, 1973	March 31, 1975	
6		John L. McLucas	November 24, 1975	April 1, 1977	
7		Langhorne Bond	May 4, 1977	January 20, 1981	
8		J. Lynn Helms	April 22, 1981	January 31, 1984	
9		Donald D. Engen	April 10, 1984	July 2, 1987	
10		T. Allan McArtor	July 22, 1987	February 17, 1989	
11		James B. Busey IV	June 30, 1989	December 4, 1991	
12		Thomas C. Richards	June 27, 1992	January 20, 1993	
13		David R. Hinson	August 10, 1993	November 9, 1996	
14		Jane Garvey	August 4, 1997	August 2, 2002	
15		Marion Blakey	September 12, 2002	September 13, 2007	
acting		Robert A. Sturgell	September 14, 2007	January 15, 2009	
acting		Lynne Osmus	January 16, 2009	May 31, 2009	
16		Randy Babbitt	June 1, 2009	December 6, 2011	
acting		Michael Huerta	December 7, 2011	January 10, 2013	
17		Michael Huerta	January 10, 2013	January 6, 2018	
acting		Daniel K. Elwell	January 6, 2018	August 12, 2019	
18		Stephen Dickson	August 12, 2019	March 31, 2022	
acting		Billy Nolen	April 1, 2022	June 9, 2023	
acting		Polly Trottenberg	June 9, 2023	October 27, 2023	
19		Michael Whitaker	October 27, 2023	January 20, 2025	
acting		Chris Rocheleau	January 30, 2025	July 10, 2025	
20		Bryan Bedford	July 10, 2025	Present	

On March 19, 2019, President Donald Trump announced he would nominate Stephen Dickson, a former executive and pilot at Delta Air Lines, to be the next FAA Administrator. On July 24, 2019, the Senate confirmed Dickson by a vote of 52–40. He was sworn in as Administrator by Transportation Secretary Elaine Chao on August 12, 2019. On February 16, 2022, Dickson announced his resignation as FAA Administrator, effective March 31, 2022. In September 2023, President Joe Biden announced that he would be nominating Mike Whitaker to lead the FAA. Whitaker previously served as deputy administrator of the FAA under President Barack Obama.

== Criticism ==
=== Conflicting roles ===
The FAA has been cited as an example of regulatory capture, "in which the airline industry openly dictates to its regulators its governing rules, arranging for not only beneficial regulation, but placing key people to head these regulators." Retired NASA Office of Inspector General Senior Special Agent Joseph Gutheinz, who used to be a Special Agent with the Office of Inspector General for the Department of Transportation and with FAA Security, is one of the most outspoken critics of FAA. Rather than commend the agency for proposing a $10.2 million fine against Southwest Airlines for its failure to conduct mandatory inspections in 2008, he was quoted as saying the following in an Associated Press story: "Penalties against airlines that violate FAA directives should be stiffer. At $25,000 per violation, Gutheinz said, airlines can justify rolling the dice and taking the chance on getting caught." He also said the FAA is often too quick to bend to pressure from airlines and pilots. Other experts have been critical of the constraints and expectations under which the FAA is expected to operate. The dual role of encouraging aerospace travel and regulating aerospace travel are contradictory. For example, to levy a heavy penalty upon an airline for violating an FAA regulation which would impact their ability to continue operating would not be considered encouraging aerospace travel.

On July 22, 2008, in the aftermath of the Southwest Airlines inspection scandal, a bill was unanimously approved in the House to tighten regulations concerning airplane maintenance procedures, including the establishment of a whistleblower office and a two-year "cooling off" period that FAA inspectors or supervisors of inspectors must wait before they can work for those they regulated. The bill also required rotation of principal maintenance inspectors and stipulated that the word "customer" properly applies to the flying public, not those entities regulated by the FAA. The bill died in a Senate committee that year.

In September 2009, the FAA administrator issued a directive mandating that the agency use the term "customers" to refer to only the flying public.

=== Lax regulatory oversight ===
In 2007, two FAA whistleblowers, inspectors Charalambe "Bobby" Boutris and Douglas E. Peters, alleged that Boutris said he attempted to ground Southwest after finding cracks in the fuselage of an aircraft, but was prevented by supervisors he said were friendly with the airline. This was validated by a report by the Department of Transportation which found FAA managers had allowed Southwest Airlines to fly 46 airplanes in 2006 and 2007 that were overdue for safety inspections, ignoring concerns raised by inspectors. Audits of other airlines resulted in two airlines grounding hundreds of planes, causing thousands of flight cancellations. The House Transportation and Infrastructure Committee held hearings in April 2008. Jim Oberstar, former chairman of the committee, said its investigation uncovered a pattern of regulatory abuse and widespread regulatory lapses, allowing 117 aircraft to be operated commercially although not in compliance with FAA safety rules. Oberstar said there was a "culture of coziness" between senior FAA officials and the airlines and "a systematic breakdown" in the FAA's culture that resulted in "malfeasance, bordering on corruption". In 2008 the FAA proposed to fine Southwest $10.2 million for failing to inspect older planes for cracks, and in 2009 Southwest and the FAA agreed that Southwest would pay a $7.5 million penalty and would adopt new safety procedures, with the fine doubling if Southwest failed to follow through.

=== Changes to air traffic controller application process ===
In 2014, the FAA modified its approach to air traffic control hiring. It launched more "off the street bids", allowing anyone with either a four-year degree or five years of full-time work experience to apply, rather than the closed college program or Veterans Recruitment Appointment bids, something that had last been done in 2008. Thousands were hired, including veterans, Collegiate Training Initiative graduates, and people who are true "off the street" hires. The move was made to open the job up to more people who might make good controllers but did not go to a college that offered a CTI program. Before the change, candidates who had completed coursework at participating colleges and universities could be "fast-tracked" for consideration. However, the CTI program had no guarantee of a job offer, nor was the goal of the program to teach people to work actual traffic. The goal of the program was to prepare people for the FAA Academy in Oklahoma City, OK. Having a CTI certificate allowed a prospective controller to skip the Air Traffic Basics part of the academy, about a 30- to 45-day course, and go right into Initial Qualification Training (IQT). All prospective controllers, CTI or not, have had to pass the FAA Academy in order to be hired as a controller. Failure at the academy means FAA employment is terminated. In January 2015 they launched another pipeline, a "prior experience" bid, where anyone with an FAA Control Tower Operator certificate (CTO) and 52 weeks of experience could apply. This was a revolving bid, every month the applicants on this bid were sorted out, and eligible applicants were hired and sent directly to facilities, bypassing the FAA academy entirely.

In the process of promoting diversity, the FAA revised its hiring process. The FAA later issued a report that the "bio-data" was not a reliable test for future performance. However, the "Bio-Q" was not the determining factor for hiring, it was merely a screening tool to determine who would take a revised Air Traffic Standardized Aptitude Test (ATSAT). Due to cost and time, it was not practical to give all 30,000 some applicants the revised ATSAT, which has since been validated. In 2015 Fox News levied criticism that the FAA discriminated against qualified candidates.

In December 2015, a reverse discrimination lawsuit was filed against the FAA seeking class-action status for the thousands of men and women who spent up to $40,000 getting trained under FAA rules before they were abruptly changed. The prospects of the lawsuit are unknown, as the FAA is a self-governing entity and therefore can alter and experiment with its hiring practices, and there was never any guarantee of a job in the CTI program.

=== Close Calls ===
In August 2023 The New York Times published an investigative report that showed overworked air traffic controllers at understaffed facilities making errors that resulted in 46 near collisions in the air and on the ground in the month of July alone.

=== Next Generation Air Transportation System ===
A May 2017 letter from staff of the U.S. House of Representatives Committee on Transportation and Infrastructure to members of the same committee sent before a meeting to discuss air traffic control privatization noted a 35-year legacy of failed air traffic control modernization management, including NextGen. The letter said the FAA initially described NextGen as fundamentally transforming how air traffic would be managed. In 2015, however, the National Research Council noted that NextGen, as currently executed, was not broadly transformational and that it is a set of programs to implement a suite of incremental changes to the National Airspace System (NAS).

More precise Performance Based Navigation can reduce fuel burn, emissions, and noise exposure for a majority of communities, but the concentration of flight tracks also can increase noise exposure for people who live directly under those flight paths. A feature of the NextGen program is GPS-based waypoints, which result in consolidated flight paths for planes. The result of this change is that many localities experience huge increases in air traffic over previously quiet areas. Complaints have risen with the added traffic and multiple municipalities have filed suit.

=== Staffing cuts ===
In 2025, despite the ongoing overhaul of the U.S. ATC system—spanning past administrations and on into the Trump presidency—DOGE elimination of numerous FAA management positions has not only demoralized staff, but by eliminating deep expertise at a very critical juncture also threatens to degrade the ability of the agency to expedite modernization efforts. In the resulting leadership vacuum, “ …the FAA is losing not only its chief air traffic official, Tim Arel, but also its associate administrator for commercial space, his deputy, the director of the audit and evaluation office, the assistant administrator for civil rights and the assistant administrator for finance and management …” in addition to: multiple leadership positions in programs within the Air Traffic Organization, including mission support and safety, technical operations, and technical training.

=== Boeing 737 MAX controversy ===
As a result of the March 10, 2019 Ethiopian Airlines Flight 302 crash and the Lion Air Flight 610 crash five months earlier, most airlines and countries began grounding the Boeing 737 MAX 8 (and in many cases all MAX variants) due to safety concerns, but the FAA declined to ground MAX 8 aircraft operating in the U.S. On March 12, the FAA said that its ongoing review showed "no systemic performance issues and provides no basis to order grounding the aircraft." Some U.S. Senators called for the FAA to ground the aircraft until an investigation into the cause of the Ethiopian Airlines crash was complete. U.S. Transportation Secretary Elaine Chao said that "If the FAA identifies an issue that affects safety, the department will take immediate and appropriate action." The FAA resisted grounding the aircraft until March 13, 2019, when it received evidence of similarities in the two accidents. By then, 51 other regulators had already grounded the plane, and by March 18, 2019, all 387 aircraft in service were grounded. Three major U.S. airlines—Southwest, United, and American Airlines—were affected by this decision.

Further investigations also revealed that the FAA and Boeing had colluded on recertification test flights, attempted to cover up important information and that the FAA had retaliated against whistleblowers.

== Regulatory process ==
=== Designated Engineering Representative ===
A Designated Engineering Representative (DER) is an engineer who is appointed under 14 CFR section 183.29 to act on behalf of a company or as an independent consultant (IC). The DER system enables the FAA to delegate certain involvement in airworthiness exams, tests, and inspections to qualified technical people outside of the FAA. Qualifications and policies for appointment of Designated Airworthiness Representatives are established in FAA Order 8100.8, Designee Management Handbook. Working procedures for DERs are prescribed in FAA Order 8110.37, Designated Engineering Representative (DER) Handbook.

- Company DERs act on behalf of their employer and may only approve, or recommend that the FAA approves, technical data produced by their employer.
- Consultant DERs are appointed to act as independent DERs and may approve, or recommend that the FAA approves, technical data produced by any person or organization.

Neither type of DER is an employee of either the FAA or the United States government. While a DER represents the FAA when acting under the authority of a DER appointment; a DER has no federal protection for work done or the decisions made as a DER. Neither does the FAA provide any indemnification for a DER from general tort law. "The FAA cannot shelter or protect DERs from the consequences of their findings."

=== Designated Airworthiness Representative (DAR) ===
A DAR is an individual appointed in accordance with 14 CFR 183.33 who may perform examination, inspection, and testing services necessary to the issuance of certificates. There are two types of DARs: manufacturing, and maintenance.

- Manufacturing DARs must possess aeronautical knowledge, experience, and meet the qualification requirements of FAA Order 8100.8.
- Maintenance DARs must hold:
  1. a mechanic's certificate with an airframe and powerplant rating, under 14 CFR part 65 Certification: Airmen Other Than Flight Crewmembers, or
  2. a repairman certificate and be employed at a repair station certificated under 14 CFR part 145, or an air carrier operating certificate holder with an FAA-approved continuous airworthiness program, and must meet the qualification requirements of Order 8100.8, Chapter 14.

Specialized Experience – Amateur-Built and Light-Sport Aircraft DARs Both Manufacturing DARs and Maintenance DARs may be authorized to perform airworthiness certification of light-sport aircraft. DAR qualification criteria and selection procedures for amateur-built and light-sport aircraft airworthiness functions are provided in Order 8100.8.

=== Continued Airworthiness Notification to the International Community (CANIC) ===
A Continued Airworthiness Notification to the International Community (commonly abbreviated as CANIC) is a notification from the FAA to civil airworthiness authorities of foreign countries of pending significant safety actions.

The FAA Airworthiness Directives Manual, states the following:

8. Continued Airworthiness Notification to the International Community (CANIC).

a. A CANIC is used to notify civil airworthiness authorities of other countries of pending significant safety actions. A significant safety action can be defined as, but not limited to, the following:

(1) Urgent safety situations;

(2) The pending issuance of an Emergency AD;

(3) A safety action that affects many people, operators;

(4) A Special Federal Aviation Regulation (SFAR);

(5) Other high interest event (e.g., a special certification review).

==== Notable CANICs ====
In 2019 "The FAA issued a CANIC to state the continued airworthiness of the Boeing 737 MAX, following the crash of Ethiopian Airlines Flight 302." "Another CANIC notified the ungrounding of the MAX, ending a 20-month grounding."

=== Proposed regulatory reforms ===
==== FAA reauthorization and air traffic control reform ====
U.S. law requires that the FAA's budget and mandate be reauthorized on a regular basis. On July 18, 2016, President Obama signed a second short-term extension of the FAA authorization, replacing a previous extension that was due to expire that day.

The 2016 extension (set to expire itself in September 2017) left out a provision pushed by Republican House leadership, including House Transportation and Infrastructure (T&I) Committee Chairman Bill Shuster (R-PA). The provision would have moved authority over air traffic control from the FAA to a non-profit corporation, as many other nations, such as Canada, Germany and the United Kingdom, have done. Shuster's bill, the Aviation Innovation, Reform, and Reauthorization (AIRR) Act, expired in the House at the end of the 114th Congress.

The House T&I Committee began the new reauthorization process for the FAA in February 2017. It is expected that the committee will again urge Congress to consider and adopt air traffic control reform as part of the reauthorization package. Shuster has additional support from President Trump, who, in a meeting with aviation industry executives in early 2017 said the U.S. air control system is "totally out of whack."

== See also ==
- Acquisition Management System
- Airport Improvement Program
- Aviation Safety Knowledge Management Environment
- Federal Aviation Regulations
- Civil aviation authority (generic term)
- Office of Dispute Resolution for Acquisition
- SAFO, Safety Alert for Operators
- United States government role in civil aviation
- Weather Information Exchange Model
