= Alliance for Automotive Innovation =

Washington, D.C.–based lobby group

- Type: Trade association
- Industry: Automotive and light truck manufacturing
- Predecessors: Global Automakers, Alliance of Automobile Manufacturers
- Founded: 2020
- Headquarters: Washington DC, United States
- Area served: Global
- Key people: John Bozzella (CEO and President); David Schwietert (chief policy executive)
- Website: www.autosinnovate.org

The Alliance for Automotive Innovation (AAI) is a Washington, D.C.–based trade association and lobby group whose members include international car and light duty truck manufacturers that build and sell products in the United States.

== History ==
A predecessor organization, the Automobile Importers of America (AIA), was formed in 1965 to provide member companies information on changes to U.S. state and federal automotive industry regulations. The AIA evolved into the primary advocacy resource for many major vehicle importers in the 1970s, opposing trade restrictions and other protectionist laws and regulations that adversely impacted its members.

The 1973 oil crisis led to increased market share for imported vehicles, which were often more fuel-efficient. In response, Ford Motor Company and the United Auto Workers union accused importers of dumping and unfair trading, and took their claims to trade authorities. The AIA, representing importers, had the case dismissed in 1975, arguing that other factors led to the market share changes.

In the 1980s, international automobile companies that were traditionally importers began opening new manufacturing plants in the US, leading to an expansion in the organization's focus. In 1990, the AIA changed its name to the Association of International Automobile Manufacturers (AIAM). In 2011, the AIAM changed its name to the Association of Global Automakers.

In 2012, there were 12 member companies, including Honda, Toyota, Nissan, Hyundai and Kia. In 2011, member companies employed 81,000 in the US in production facility investments totaling $45 billion. The association stated that its members accounted for 42% of all vehicles sold in the US and 34% of vehicles manufactured in the U.S. from January to September 2011.

John Bozzella became the association's president and CEO on April 1, 2014. He was preceded by Michael J. Stanton, who had held the role since 2006. Previously, the association was led by Ralph Millet (1965 to 1977), George Nield (1977 to 1992), Philip A. Hutchinson Jr. (1992 to 2000), and Tim MacCarthy (2000 to 2006).

In January 2020, the Association of Global Automakers merged with the Alliance of Automobile Manufacturers to become the Alliance for Automotive Innovation. Members of both groups became members of the Alliance, representing nearly every automotive manufacturer selling cars and light duty trucks in the US, including the American "Big Three" (General Motors, Ford, and Chrysler). The AAI also expanded its membership to include suppliers and startups. Bozzella became the CEO and President of the new organization, with the AAM’s David Schwietert serving as chief policy officer.

The AAI provides information to policymakers on key issues affecting the automotive sector and supports related state and national legislation. The AAI reported that in 2018, the automotive industry invested US$125 billion in R&D and earned more than 5,000 global patents.

== Members ==
The new organization has expanded its membership to include suppliers, startups and other automotive-related associations.

As of August 2023, members included:

- Aisin
- Aptiv
- Autoliv
- BASF
- BMW
- Bosch
- Cruise
- Denso
- Envision AESC
- Ferrari
- Ford
- General Motors
- Harman
- Honda
- Hyundai
- Infineon
- Isuzu
- Jaguar Land Rover
- Kia
- LG
- Luminar
- Magna Steyr
- Mazda
- McLaren
- Mercedes-Benz
- Mitsubishi
- Nissan
- Nuro
- Panasonic
- Porsche
- Qualcomm
- Samsung SDI
- SiriusXM
- Stellantis
- Subaru
- Texas Instruments
- Toyota
- Volkswagen
- Volvo

== Activities ==
The AAI represents, advises and advocates for manufacturers of cars and light duty trucks in the United States. It focuses on policy development for emissions reduction, expansion of electric vehicle manufacturing, and investment in safety technology.

=== Market and trade ===
The association helps its members formulate and defend positions against legislation and regulations that make participation in the US market more costly or difficult for automakers. In 1994, the association filed an amicus brief in support of a successful appeals decision against the classification of the Nissan Pathfinder as a cargo vehicle. The resulting ruling opened the doors to Japanese expansion in the US light truck market, in particular the growing SUV segment. During the 1990s, the association opposed a move by the Clinton administration to impose a 100% tariff on 13 luxury vehicles imported from Japan. In December 2020, the Alliance issued a report with eight policy strategies designed to secure US competitiveness in automotive technologies, including incentives for industry R&D and investments in EV charging infrastructure.

=== Fuel economy and emissions standards ===
On behalf of its members, the association develops and advances positions on fuel efficiency, greenhouse gas emissions and other regulations and standards. The association opposes allowing individual states to adopt standards more stringent than the federal standards for vehicle emissions and fuel economy. It supports the Obama administration's proposed changes to CAFE standards, which would require automakers to improve car mileage by 5 percent annually until 2025, aiming to reduce greenhouse gas pollution.

In 2007, the association brought a lawsuit against the state of California, attempting to establish that the state had no authority to regulate greenhouse gas emissions. The association's argument was that the only method to significantly reduce such emissions, primarily carbon dioxide, is by improving fuel economy, and under federal energy legislation from 1975, only the Department of Transportation has authority to establish a fuel economy standard. As such, California's standards are preempted by federal law. California is able to set its own standards for tailpipe emissions via a waiver by the Environmental Protection Agency (EPA) from preemption under the Clean Air Act, as it had begun regulation of air pollution before the EPA was established. The AAI also argued that California and other states being granted authority to regulate greenhouse gas emissions would force manufacturers to adhere to too many different standards, effectively raising the cost of cars and eliminating model choices. In December 2007, a district court judge ruled against the association's suit. The association appealed this decision. In February 2008, the association issued a statement supporting the EPA's decision not to issue the waiver that would be required for California to regulate greenhouse gas emissions from motor vehicles. The association's president, Michael Stanton, stated that its interest was not in resisting such regulation, but ensuring that uniform standards are set by the federal government.

In 2009, the association stated its support for an agreement reached by the Obama administration to adopt a single national standard for fuel economy, which led to outstanding lawsuits being dropped.

=== Electric vehicles ===
The Alliance for Automotive Innovation has opposed US government efforts to electrify road transport. In February 2025, the Alliance advocated for the US Senate to revoke California's authority to enforce the Advanced Clean Cars II (ACC II) policy. The Alliance opposed the adoption of ACC II in Illinois in a March 2025 testimony.

In the third quarter of 2021, the AAI reported that electric vehicles comprised 6% of all light duty car sales, with the highest volume of EV sales ever recorded at 187,000 vehicles. This was an 11% increase in sales, as opposed to a 1.3% increase in gasoline and diesel cars. The report indicated that California was the US leader in EV with nearly 40% of US purchases, followed by Florida – 6%, Texas – 5% and New York 4.4%.

In August 2021, the Biden administration issued an executive order that called for half of new vehicles sold in 2030 in the US—including battery electric vehicles, gasoline-electric hybrid vehicles, and hydrogen fuel cell vehicles—to be zero-emission. The organization indicated its support for the order, but suggested the US government had to invest in expanding charging stations around the country. When the order was issued, the US had 40,000+ active charging stations, a number estimated to be insufficient to power the growing number of EVs. Later that year, the Biden administration put forth a strategy for building the network. In response, the AAI developed a list of "recommended attributes for charging stations" that provided data on charging rates, power grid requirements, charging costs, and station layouts.

=== Fuel formulation ===
In late 2010, the AAI was part of a coalition of engine manufacturers that filed a suit in the United States Court of Appeals to block the Environmental Protection Agency’s approval of an increase of the ethanol content of gasoline from 10 percent to 15 percent. The association expressed concerns that alcohol-blended fuel could cause damage or problems to engines that were not originally built to run on such a fuel. The association noted that the Clean Air Act required producers of any new fuel or fuel additive to show that those fuels would not contribute to the failure of vehicles or engines to meet emissions standards. The association and other plaintiffs requested time to conduct studies assessing the impact of an increase in the ethanol content of gasoline on newer model automobiles and small engines.

The association and 30 other organizations—including Friends of the Earth, the National Black Chamber of Commerce, and representatives of the small-engine and snack-food industries—signed a letter in 2008 asking the House Committee on Science, Space, and Technology to support a bill requiring more study and scientific evaluation before so-called E15 fuels are approved for consumer use.

=== Safety and consumer protection ===
Alongside the now-defunct Automobile Manufacturers Association, in the late 1990s, the Association of Global Automakers advocated for U.S. regulators to begin recognizing some of the ECE regulations, which are used instead of U.S. regulations throughout most of the world.

The association advocates a ban on the use of handheld devices to text or talk while driving as "an important part of vehicle crash prevention".

==== New Car Assessment Program (NCAP) ====
In 2021, the alliance recommended that the NHTSA update its New Car Assessment Program (NCAP), which provides safety data that focuses on new technologies and safety features to individuals buying new vehicles. The organization specifically asked that NCAP be updated on a consistent, regular basis by offering insight into new safety technologies; that NCAP officials engage with stakeholders on these technologies at least once/year; that the program include a three-year update and review cycle for other safety programs like the Euro NCAP program; that the NHTSA review the program regularly to determine its efficacy; and that the program’s rules be structured to remove regulatory barriers and red tape that might hinder technology.

In March 2022, the NHTSA released its proposal to modernize the NCAP. The proposed new program contains three new technologies in driver assistance—driver blind spot detection and intervention, electronic lane-keeping, and computerized emergency braking systems protecting pedestrians—and also recommends new, improved test procedures and criteria on a car’s performance for existing driver-assistance technology. The NHTSA also recommended a 10-year "road map for future programs" and is seeking input on a ranking apparatus for driver-assistance technologies.

==== Right to Repair Act ====
The association opposes the Motor Vehicle Owners' Right to Repair Act, the name of several related proposed bills in both the United States Congress and state legislatures. According to the association, the bill's supporters want not only repair codes, but also design and manufacturing codes, which it argues is an effort by aftermarket companies to access manufacturers' intellectual property, and is unnecessary as the information that independent shops need for repairs is already available online.

==== Advanced driver assistance systems ====
In 2021, the organization proposed a set of driver monitoring safety principles for vehicles equipped with advanced driver assistance systems (ADAS) to make sure the technology is effective and safe. The alliance recommends that consumers understand that driver assists do not imply more capability, and states that driver monitoring should be a standard feature with assists. NHTSA has not issued specific regulations. Vehicles that are “self-driving” are not sold by any existing manufacturers. Automakers do require all drivers to be alert and mentally and physically involved in the driving experience. The alliance is specifically advocating camera-based driver monitoring systems in vehicles equipped with ADAS to ensure that drivers pay sufficient attention to driving. The driver should be ready to assume full control of the vehicle in the event that the ADAS does not perform properly.

==== Adaptive driving beam headlights ====
In October 2021, the Alliance recommended to the NHTSA that the administration settle on a new rule allowing adaptive driving beam (ADB) headlight technology in US vehicles. In February 2022, NHTSA administrator Steven Cliff signed a rule amending Federal Motor Vehicle Safety Standard 108, a regulation covering lighting, reflective devices and signalling in cars, satisfying a requirement from the 2021 recommendation.

==== Rear seat reminder ====
The AAI notified car buyers that its members would make rear seat reminders standard on US vehicles by the model year 2025. The feature is important because of drivers leaving unattended children in the back seat of a car, where interior temperatures can rise 20° in 10 minutes, causing hyperthermia. The size of a child’s body also indicates that children can be affected by heat three to five times faster than adults. Between 1990 and 2018, 889 children died of hyperthermia after being left in cars. Some safety proponents found the alarm system insufficient because it can reset when the car is shut down, and state that the system would be inadequate in the 25% of childhood hyperthermia deaths where the child climbed into a car alone.

== See also ==
- American Automotive Policy Council
