= Go package =

Factory performance option on cars built by American Motors Corporation

The Go package (or Go Pack) was a factory option that included various performance equipment that was available on several muscle cars manufactured by American Motors Corporation (AMC).

== Background ==
During the late-1960s and early-1970s, domestic automakers lines used "catchy marketing campaigns, such as Dodge's "Scat Pack", Plymouth's "Rapid Transit System", Ford's "Total Performance", or Oldsmobile's "4-4-2" and "W-machines".

American Motors Corporation planned a program to create a performance image that included a pulling-out from the antiquated Automobile Manufacturers Association (AMA) edict against supporting auto racing that General Motors, Ford, and Chrysler no longer followed. Managers at the automaker made a decision "to go after the youth market ... AMC muscle soon flourished, including not just AMX and Javelin pony cars, but other potent packages like the Hurst SC/Rambler of 1969, Rebel Machine in 1970..."

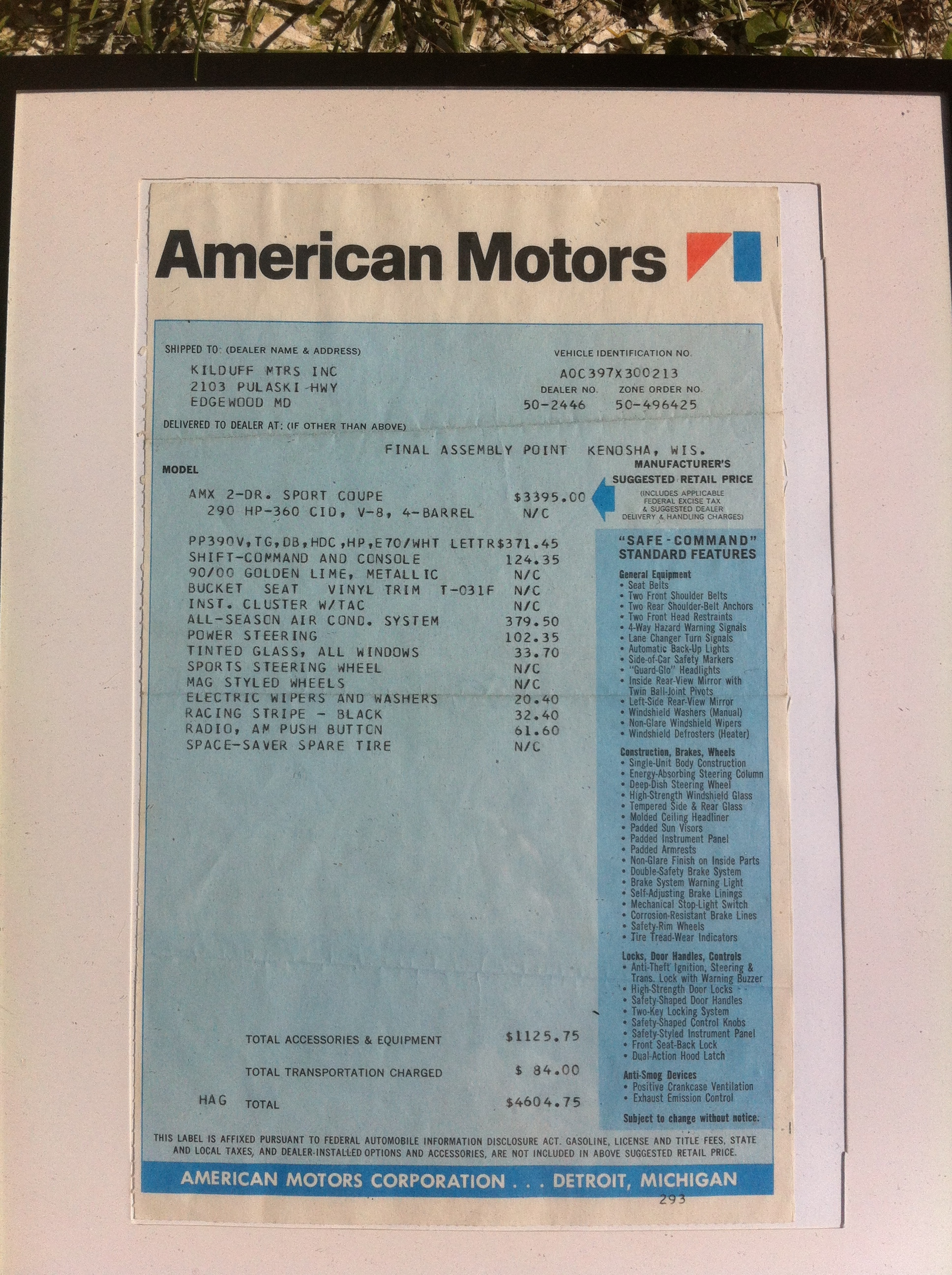
1970 AMX window sticker showing the Go Pac listed as "PP390V, TG, DB, HDC, HP, E70/WHT LETTR $371.41"

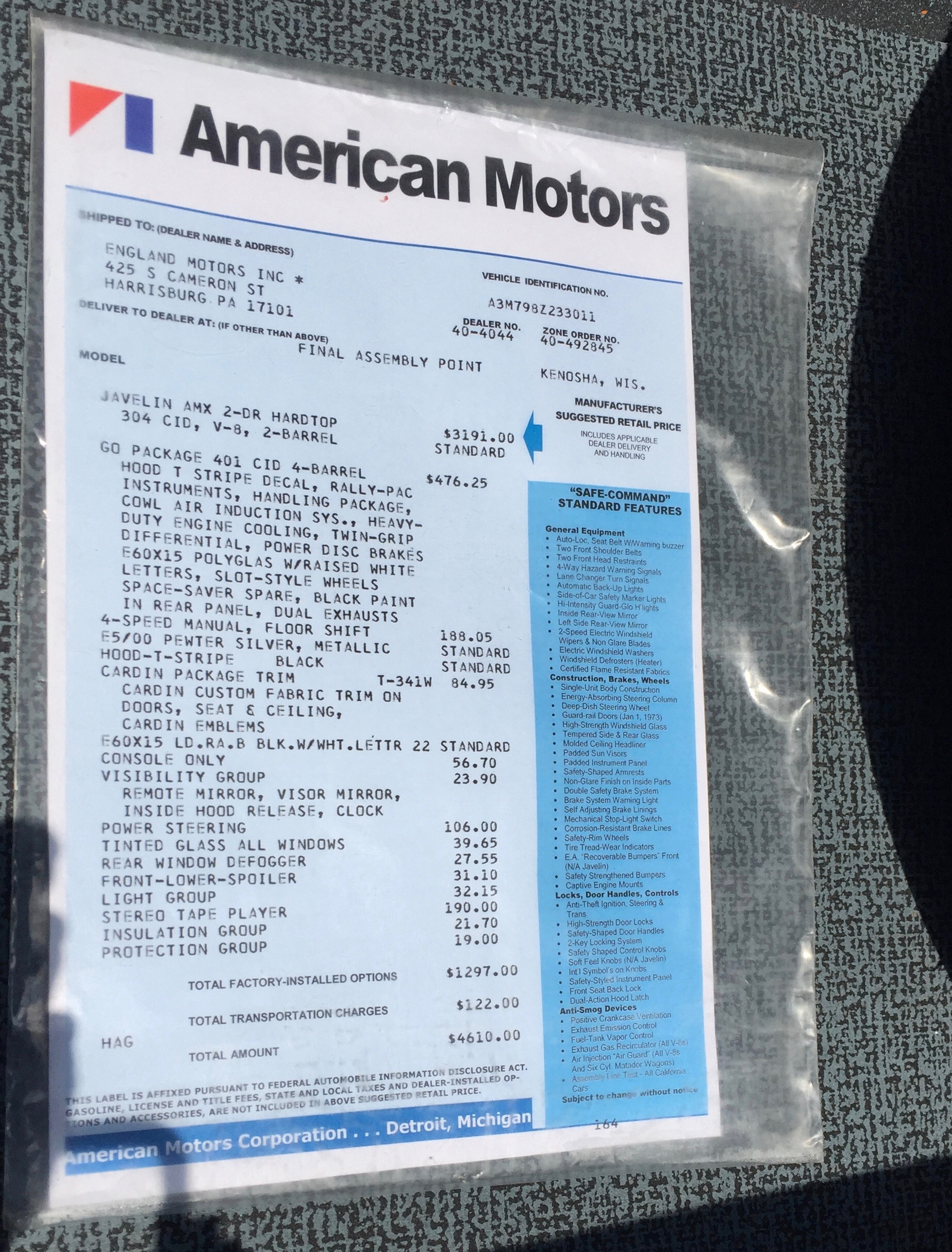
1973 Javelin AMX Monroney sticker with the Go Pac 401 CID 4-barrel option listed for $476.25

The 1968 model year Javelin was the first to offer AMC's optional "Go package". The official name on the dealer vehicle order forms from AMC was "Performance Package", but it was described as a Go Package in the automaker's sales brochures and listed as such on the window stickers.

In contrast with high-performance versions – such as the 1969 Hurst SC/Rambler, 1970 Rebel Machine, and 1971 Hornet SC/360 – that had a specific model numbers assigned to them, only an original window sticker (Monroney sticker, factory order form, or a build sheet can authenticate whether a particular vehicle was originally factory equipped with a Go Pack because there is no identification code within the vehicle identification number (VIN) or on AMC's metal door tags to identify this option.

== Available models ==
- 1968–1970 AMC AMX
- 1968–1974 AMC Javelin
- 1971 Hornet SC/360
- 1971 Matador Machine

== Equipment ==
The actual contents of the Go Packs varied from year to year and according to specific models.

The Go Pack on the 1968 AMX included either the 343 cu in (5.6 L) or 390 cu in (6.4 L) high-output four-barrel V8 engine with a dual exhaust system with chromed exhaust tips, heavy-duty cooling system, power front disc brakes, uprated suspension for improved handling, "Twin-Grip" limited-slip differential, wide-tread red striped tires mounted on five-spoke "Magnum 500" wheels, and over-the-top racing stripes. Except for the racing stripes, the performance options could also be ordered individually on the 1968 and 1969 AMXs.

For the 1970 model year AMXs and Javelins, the ram-air intake hood was only available as part of the Go Package.

The 1971 model year Hornet SC/360 was described as the "antidote to the money-squeezing, insurance-staging muscle cars of America" and available with a special Go Package. In addition to the Hornet SC/360's standard features such as floor-mounted transmission shifter, individual reclining seats, rally stripes, slot-style wheels, and D70x14 performance tires, the Go Package substituted or added the four-barrel 360 cu in (5.9 L) V8 rated at 285 hp (213 kW; 289 PS), ram-air hood scoop, dual exhaust system, handling package, white-lettered tires, and a tachometer.

The 1971 Matador two-door hardtop had a "Machine Go" package option. Ever higher insurance rates and more stringent emission requirements meant dropping the separate Rebel Machine model after its one-year production. Nevertheless, the package was a form of continuing the 1970 Rebel Machine, which was a separate model. The Machine Go package was offered only at the start of the 1971 model year and it was mentioned within a list of options in only the first edition of AMC's full-line brochure. This performance package was available with the 360 cu in (5.9 L) (priced at $373) or the 401 cu in (6.6 L) V8 engine (for $461) with either a four-speed manual or a three-speed automatic transmission. This package included 15x7-inch slot-styled steel wheels with white-lettered Goodyear Polyglas tires, dual exhaust system, a heavy-duty handling package, power disk brakes, and "space-saver" spare tire. A 2.87 rear axle ratio came with the Shift-Command automatic (3.25 and 3.54 were optional) while the floor four-speed manual versions came with 3.54 axle ratio (3.15 and 3.91 were optional). The "Twin-Grip" rear differential was a recommended option when ordering the Go package, and the limited-slip system was required in combination with a four-speed manual transmission and the 3.91 rear axle ratio. There were about 55 or 57 Machine Go-equipped Matadors built in 1971, but the exact number is not known because "almost all of AMC's records were bulldozed when Chrysler "merged" with AMC in 1987".

For 1972 and 1973, the Go Package was available only on the Javelin AMX models. It included either a 360 cu in (5.9 L) or 401 cu in (6.6 L) high-output four-barrel V8 with cowl air to carburetor induction system, and dual exhausts, "Twin-Grip" differential, handling package, power disk brakes, heavy-duty cooling, a "T-stripe" on the hood, blacked out rear taillight panel, "Rally-Pac" instrumentation, E60x15 raised while letter Goodyear Polyglas tires on 15x7-inch slot-styled styled steel wheels, and a "space-saver" spare tire.

The Go Package continued to be available for the 1974 Javelin AMX. It required ordering the four-barrel versions of the 360 cu in (5.9 L) or the 401 cu in (6.6 L) V8 engines with an automatic or four-speed manual transmission. This was because the standard engine and transmission combination on the AMX models was downgraded to 304 cu in (5.0 L) V8 with a floor-shifted three-speed manual transmission and the two-barrel version 360 cu in (5.9 L) was also available with center console shifted automatic transmission. All 1974 engines could run on regular leaded, low lead, or no lead fuels. More stringent emission standards meant that the four-speed manual transmissions were not available in California.
