= AutoAlliance =

AutoAlliance may refer to:

- AutoAlliance International, an automobile assembly plant in Flat Rock, Michigan, United States
- AutoAlliance Thailand, an automobile assembly firm in Rayong Province, Thailand

== See also ==
- Alliance of Automobile Manufacturers, a former trade group of American automobile manufacturers
