= Ann E. Carlson =

American attorney and legal scholar (born 1960)

Ann Carlson
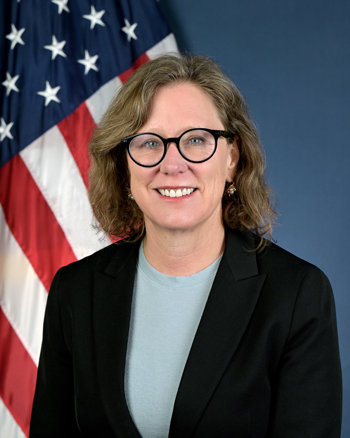

Administrator the National Highway Traffic Safety Administration
- Acting
- In office September 12, 2022 – December 26, 2023
- President: Joe Biden
- Preceded by: Steven Cliff
- Succeeded by: Sophie Shulman (acting)

Personal details
- Born: 1960 (age 65–66)
- Education: University of California, Santa Barbara (BA); Harvard University (JD)

Academic work
- Discipline: Law
- Sub-discipline: Environmental law Environmental policy Climate change Environmental federalism
- Institutions: UCLA School of Law

Ann E. Carlson (born 1960) is an American attorney and legal scholar who served as the acting administrator of the National Highway Traffic Safety Administration from September 2022 to December 2023. Before joining the Biden administration, Carlson was the Shirley Shapiro Professor of Environmental Law at the UCLA School of Law, where she also served as faculty co-director of the Emmett Center on Climate Change and the Environment. She is an expert on U.S. environmental law and policy with a particular focus on climate change and environmental federalism. Biden administration withdrew her from nomination in May 2023.

== Education ==
Carlson earned a Bachelor of Arts degree in political science from the University of California, Santa Barbara in 1982 and a Juris Doctor from Harvard Law School in 1989.

== Career ==
Carlson joined the faculty of UCLA in 1994. She previously practiced law with the Los Angeles public interest law firm Hall and Phillips (now Phillips and Cohen), where she represented Stephanie Nordlinger in a challenge to California's Proposition 13 in a case that reached the Supreme Court of the United States. Her work representing Emil Stache and Almon Muelhausen in a case under the False Claims Act against Teledyne Industries was featured in the book The Giantkillers.

At UCLA, Carlson has served as Academic Associate Dean and currently serves as Vice Dean for Faculty Recruitment and Intellectual Life. Carlson's scholarship examines unusual arrangements of federalism, evaluation of domestic environmental law and policy, and climate change. Carlson is the recipient of UCLA's highest teaching honor, the Eby Award for the Art of Teaching, and the Rutter Award for Excellence in Teaching.

Carlson served as a panelist for the influential National Academy of Sciences committee on Limiting the Magnitude of Climate Change. She is a member of the Steering Committee of the American Academy of Arts and Sciences Alternative Energy Future project. Carlson is a frequent commentator on environmental issues and a founder of and frequent blogger at Legal Planet.

== National Highway Traffic Safety Administration (NHTSA) ==
On January 21, 2021, the Department of Transportation announced Carlson as the incoming chief counsel to the National Highway Traffic Safety Administration (NHTSA) in the Biden administration. In September 2022, Carlson became acting administrator of NHTSA, and on February 13, 2023, President Joe Biden nominated her to a term as administrator of the agency. Her nomination was later withdrawn on May 30, 2023.

During her tenure, the NHTSA has accelerated its probe into Tesla's Autopilot technology to ensure that drivers are paying adequate attention to the road.

Carlson stepped down from her acting administrator position in December 2023 due to limits on the length of service for acting officials.

== Works ==
- Carlson, Ann E. (2006). Cases and Materials on Environmental Law. West Publishing. (Roger W. Findley, Daniel A. Farber and Jody Freeman)
