= American Automotive Policy Council =

American trade group formed in 2009 by Chrysler, Ford Motor Company and General Motors

- Formation: 2009; 17 years ago
- Founder: Chrysler, Ford Motor Company and General Motors
- Type: Trade group
- Purpose: Represents the common public policy interests of its three member companies.
- Location: United States
- President: Matt Blunt
- Website: www.americanautomakers.org

The American Automotive Policy Council is an American trade group formed in 2009 by Chrysler, Ford Motor Company and General Motors. The company represents the common public policy interests of its three member companies.

Former Missouri Governor Matt Blunt has served as president of the American Automotive Policy Council since 2011.

== See also ==
- Automobile Manufacturers Association
- Alliance of Automobile Manufacturers
- Association of Global Automakers
