= Automobile Manufacturers Association =

US auto organization

The Automobile Manufacturers Association was a trade group of automobile manufacturers that operated under various names in the United States from 1911 to 1999. It was replaced by the Alliance of Automobile Manufacturers.

== Early names ==
A different group called the Automobile Manufacturers' Association was active in the very early 1900s, but then dissolved. Another early group was the Association of Licensed Automobile Manufacturers, formed in 1903 and which was involved in licensing and collecting royalties from the George Baldwin Selden engine patent. Henry Ford effectively defeated the patent in court in 1911 and the Association of Licensed Automobile Manufacturers dissolved.

However, the same manufacturers regrouped later in 1911 and formed the Automobile Board of Trade. In 1913, this became the National Automobile Chamber of Commerce.

In 1934, this group renamed itself to the Automobile Manufacturers Association. This was the name the group had the longest and became the best known by. It focused upon establishing a code for fair competition. In 1939, it moved its headquarters from New York City, where it had been close to bankers, to Detroit, where the manufacturers were all based. The organization had a budget of $1 million at the time.

== Activities ==
In the 1930s, they promoted disputed information that blamed pedestrians for fatal car wrecks.

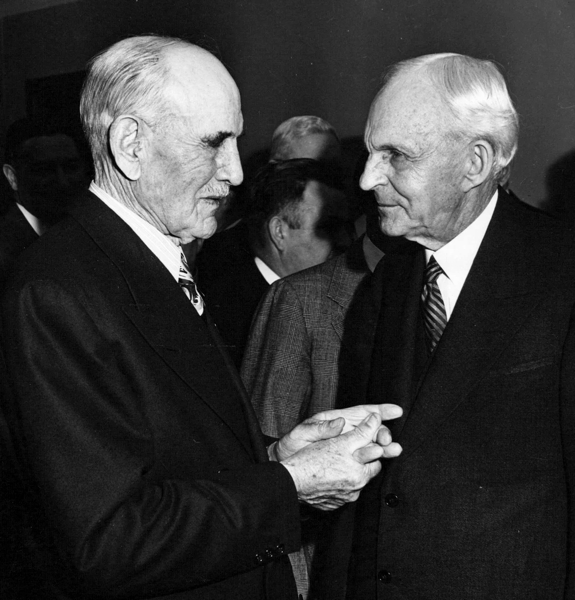
Charles W. Nash and Henry Ford at the 1946 Automotive Jubilee, when both were 82

The Automobile Manufacturers Association sponsored the Automotive Golden Jubilee, a series of events that lasted ten days. It celebrated Detroit as the "Automobile Capital of the World" and the over 90 million automobiles that were made in the first 50 years of the industry. The festivities were organized by William S. Knudsen, former president of General Motors, and George W. Romney, of the AMA who became president of Nash-Kelvinator. The Jubilee culminated by bringing together fourteen living automotive pioneers. On May 31, the "Charles Clifton Award" was presented to the following for their contributions to developing an industry and putting people on wheels:

- Pioneers and founders:

J. Frank Duryea - Along with his brother, Charles, he built what is often credited as the first American gasoline-powered automobile. The Duryea brothers founded the Duryea Motor Wagon Company, one of the earliest American car manufacturers.
William C. Durant - An entrepreneur who founded General Motors (GM) and co-founded Chevrolet. Durant was known for creating a single company with multiple brands, each with a different car line, a business model that allowed GM to appeal to a wide range of consumers.
Henry Ford - Founder of the Ford Motor Company and a central figure in American industrial history. He pioneered the assembly line for mass production, making automobiles affordable for the middle class.
Charles W. Nash - Served as the fifth president of General Motors before leaving to establish Nash Motors in 1916. Nash Motors became a prominent independent automaker, known for producing affordable cars for the American middle class.
Ransom E. Olds - Early automotive pioneer who founded the Olds Motor Works (later Oldsmobile) and the REO Motor Car Company. He is credited with building one of the first gasoline-powered cars and was a leader in the industry's early years.
Alfred P. Sloan - president and CEO of General Motors, he transformed the company into the world's largest corporation. He is credited with key innovations in corporate management, including a pricing structure that organized GM's brands by price point, preventing them from competing with each other and encouraging customer loyalty as their income grew.

- Engineers and innovators:

Edgar Apperson - An automobile manufacturer and engineer who built one of the first horseless carriages with his brother, Elmer. They were influential pioneers in the early days of automotive design.
Charles Brady King - A pioneer credited with being the first person to design, build, and drive a self-propelled automobile on the streets of Detroit in 1896, several months before Henry Ford. He also mentored other industry figures, including Henry Ford and Ransom Olds.
George Holley - Established a company with his brother Earl to supply carburetors for many Detroit-built automobiles, and later produced automotive performance components.

- Racing and supporting activities:

Barney Oldfield - Racing driver whose name became synonymous with speed in the early 20th century. He won the inaugural AAA National Championship in 1905 and was a celebrated figure who helped popularize the automobile.
Frank Kwilinski - A factory worker.
Charles Snyder - An automobile dealer.
John Van Benschoten - An automobile dealer.
John Zaugg - A factory worker

During the early stages of World War II, the association played a role in adapting American automotive manufacturing capabilities towards arms production efforts, especially regarding large aircraft engines. Within hours of the December 7, 1941 attack on Pearl Harbor, the association invited all companies in the larger automotive industry, regardless of whether they were association members, to join a new cooperative undertaking, the Automotive Council for War Production. About 654 manufacturing companies joined that produced nearly $29 billion in output, including large numbers of motorized vehicles, tanks, engines, and other products for the Allied military forces. Between a fifth and a quarter of all U.S. wartime production was accounted for by the automotive industry. In 1950, the association published the book, Freedom's Arsenal: The Story of the Automotive Council for War Production, to document this achievement.

They promoted the use of the word accident to describe car wrecks, as a way to make vehicle-related deaths and injuries seem like an unavoidable matter of fate, rather than a problem that could be addressed. The automobile industry accomplished this by writing customized articles as a free service for newspapers, using the industry's preferred language.

Following the 1955 Le Mans disaster and the 1957 NASCAR Mercury Meteor crashes into the grandstands, the Automobile Manufacturers Association placed a ban on factory-supported racing. As a result, the automotive industry essentially disappeared from NASCAR. This ban also extended to manufacturers supplying the pace car for the Indianapolis 500 (leaving local dealerships and track officials to procure vehicles for official use). The ban began to end in 1962 when Henry Ford II announced that the Ford Motor Company would again begin participating openly in NASCAR.

In 1969, the association engaged with rising federal regulation, including environmental regulation as smog, lead pollution, and other pollutants from the burgeoning automotive industry grew. Association president Thomas C. Mann's annual address to the association in 1969, entitled "Clean Air and the Automobile," detailed the industry's attempts to reduce pollutants while questioning the harm caused by them. The speech is also an early example of industry questioning the risk of global warming brought about by carbon dioxide pollution.

== Foreign-owned automakers ==
In August 1972, the group changed its name to the Motor Vehicle Manufacturers Association, to reflect the growing importance of truck makers. A major issue then developed over whether foreign-owned automakers with operations and in some cases manufacturing within the U.S. could join the group. In 1986 the association ruled that foreign transplants had to manufacture half their American sales within the country in order to join; a grandfather clause allowed Honda and Volvo to stay in. In May 1988, Toyota's attempt to join was rejected on this line. By 1992, Toyota and Nissan were able to meet the membership mark and qualify to join.

In late 1992, the group expelled Honda, Volvo, and heavy truck makers and changed its name to the American Automobile Manufacturers Association. The association now was back to its traditional stance of representing the "Big Three" manufacturers. They also moved their headquarters from Detroit to Washington, D.C., in order to have a stronger governmental presence.

However, their situation became problematic with the DaimlerChrysler merger of 1998, which meant there were only two American-only manufacturers, too few for an organization. The American Automobile Manufacturers Association was thus phased out in January 1999, and a new and different successor group, the Alliance of Automobile Manufacturers, was formed and included many foreign-owned manufacturers.

== See also ==
- American Automotive Policy Council
- Association of Global Automakers
