= Corporate average fuel economy =

Fuel economy standards in the U.S.

Corporate average fuel economy (CAFE) standards are regulations in the United States, first enacted by the United States Congress in 1975, after the 1973–74 Arab Oil Embargo, to improve the average fuel economy of cars and light trucks (trucks, vans and sport utility vehicles) produced for sale in the United States. More recently, efficiency standards were developed and implemented for heavy-duty pickup trucks and commercial medium-duty and heavy-duty vehicles. CAFE neither directly offers incentives for customers to choose fuel efficient vehicles nor directly affects fuel prices. Rather, it attempts to accomplish the goals indirectly, by making it more expensive for automakers to build inefficient vehicles by introducing penalties.

CAFE standards are administered by the secretary of transportation via the National Highway Traffic Safety Administration. The original CAFE standards sought to drive automotive innovation to curtail fuel consumption, and now the aim is also to create domestic jobs and cut global warming. A study found that stringent CAFE standards together with government incentives for fuel efficient vehicles in the United States should accelerate the demand for electric vehicles.

In 2025, fines for violating CAFE standards were largely eliminated.

Observed CAFE by regulatory class

== Overview ==
The Energy Policy and Conservation Act (EPCA), as amended by the 2007 Energy Independence and Security Act (EISA), requires that the U.S. Department of Transportation (DOT) establish standards separately for passenger automobiles (passenger cars) and nonpassenger automobiles (light trucks) at the maximum feasible levels in each model year, and requires that DOT enforce compliance with the standards. DOT has delegated the responsibilities to the National Highway Traffic Safety Administration (NHTSA). Through EPCA and EISA, U.S. law (49 U.S. Code § 32919) also preempts state or local laws: "a State or a political subdivision of a State may not adopt or enforce a law or regulation related to fuel economy standards or average fuel economy standards."

The CAFE achieved by a given fleet of vehicles in a given model year is the production-weighted harmonic mean fuel economy, expressed in miles per US gallon (mpg), of a manufacturer's fleet of current model year passenger cars or light trucks with a gross vehicle weight rating (GVWR) of 8,500 pounds (3,856 kg) or less (but also including medium-duty passenger vehicles, such as large sport-utility vehicles and passenger vans, with GVWR up to 10,000 pounds), produced for sale in the United States. The CAFE standards in a given model year define the CAFE levels that manufacturers' fleets are required to meet in that model year, specific levels depending on the characteristics and mix of vehicles produced by each manufacturer. If the average fuel economy of a manufacturer's annual fleet of vehicle production falls below the applicable requirement, the manufacturer must either apply sufficient CAFE credits (see below) to cover the shortfall or pay a penalty, currently $14 per 0.1 mpg under the standard, multiplied by the manufacturer's total production for the U.S. domestic market. Congress established both of these provisions explicitly in EPCA, as amended in 2007 by EISA. In addition, a Gas Guzzler Tax is levied on individual passenger car models (but not trucks, vans, minivans, or SUVs) that get less than 22.5 miles per US gallon (10.5 L/100 km).

Starting in 2011, the CAFE standards are newly expressed as mathematical functions depending on vehicle footprint, a measure of vehicle size determined by multiplying the vehicle's wheelbase by its average track width. A complicated 2011 mathematical formula was replaced starting in 2012 with a simpler inverse-linear formula with cutoff values. CAFE footprint requirements are set up such that a vehicle with a larger footprint has a lower fuel economy requirement than a vehicle with a smaller footprint. For example, the fuel economy target for the 2012 Honda Fit with a footprint of 40 sq ft (3.7 m^{2}) is 36 miles per US gallon (6.5 L/100 km), equivalent to a published fuel economy of 27 miles per US gallon (8.7 L/100 km) (see #Calculations of MPG overestimated for information regarding the difference), and a Ford F-150 with its footprint of 65–75 sq ft (6.0–7.0 m^{2}) has a fuel economy target of 22 miles per US gallon (11 L/100 km), i.e., 17 miles per US gallon (14 L/100 km) published. Individual vehicles do not have to meet their fuel economy targets; CAFE compliance is enforced at the fleet level. CAFE 2016 target fuel economy of 34.0 MPG (44 sq. ft. footprint) compares to 2012 advanced vehicle performance of Prius hybrid on the compliance test cycles: 70.7 MPG, Plug-in Prius hybrid: 69.8 MPGe and LEAF electric vehicle: 141.7 MPGe. The compliance fuel economy of plug-in electric vehicles such as the Plug-in Prius or LEAF is complicated by accounting for the energy used in generating electricity.

CAFE has separate standards for "passenger cars" and "light trucks" even if the majority of "light trucks" are being used as passenger vehicles. The market share of "light trucks" grew steadily from 9.7% in 1979 to 47% in 2001, remained in 50% numbers up to 2011. More than 500,000 vehicles in the 1999 model year exceeded the 8,500 lb (3,900 kg) GVWR cutoff and were thus omitted from CAFE calculations. More recently, coverage of medium duty trucks has been added to the CAFE regulations starting in 2012, and heavy duty commercial trucks starting in 2014.

Share defined as car or light truck

The National Highway Traffic Safety Administration (NHTSA) regulates CAFE standards and the U.S. Environmental Protection Agency (EPA) measures vehicle fuel efficiency. Congress specifies that CAFE standards must be set at the "maximum feasible level" given consideration for:

1. technological feasibility;
2. economic practicality;
3. effect of other standards on fuel economy;
4. need of the nation to conserve energy.

Historically, the EPA has encouraged consumers to buy more fuel efficient vehicles, while the NHTSA expressed concerns that smaller, more fuel efficient vehicles may lead to increased traffic fatalities. Thus higher fuel efficiency was associated with lower traffic safety, intertwining the issues of fuel economy, road-traffic safety, air pollution, and carbon emissions. In the mid-2000s, increasing safety of smaller cars and the poor safety record of light trucks began to reverse this association. Nevertheless, in 2008, the on-road vehicle fleets in the United States and Canada had the lowest overall average fuel economy among first world nations: 25 miles per US gallon (9.4 L/100 km) in North America, versus 45 miles per US gallon (5.2 L/100 km) in the European Union and was even higher in Japan, according to data as of 2008. Furthermore, despite general opinion that larger and heavier (and therefore relatively fuel-uneconomical) vehicles are safer, the U.S. traffic fatality rate—and its trend over time—is higher than some other western nations, although it has recently started to gradually decline at a faster rate than in previous years.

== Effect on automotive fuel economy ==
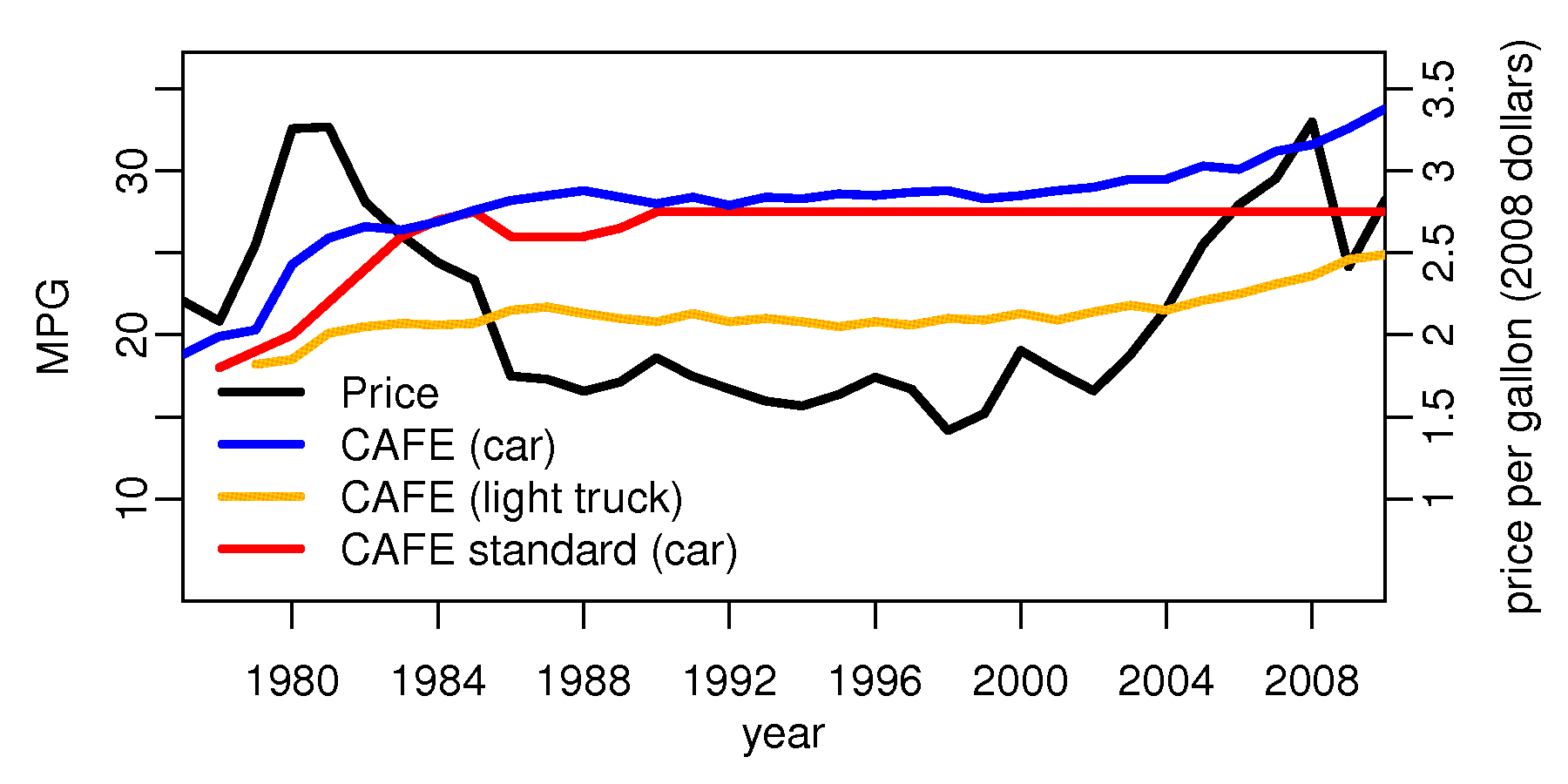
Prices inflation adjusted to 2008 dollars

In 2002, a committee of the National Academy of Sciences wrote a report on the effects of the CAFE standard. The report's conclusions include a finding that in the absence of CAFE, and with no other fuel economy regulation substituted, motor vehicle fuel consumption would have been approximately 14 percent higher than it actually was in 2002. However, due to the effect of these standards on the types and weights of vehicles sold, it has increased the costs of vehicles and may have led to an estimated 1,300 to 2,600 increased fatalities in the year 1993 alone, though certain members of the committee dissented from the latter opinion.

A plot of average overall vehicle fuel economy (CAFE) for new model year passenger cars, the required by law CAFE standard target fuel economy value (CAFE standard) for new model year passenger cars, and fuel prices, adjusted for inflation, shows that there has been little variation over the past 20 years. Within this period, there are three distinct periods of fuel economy change:

1. from 1979 to 1982 the fuel economy rose as the CAFE standard rose dramatically and the price of fuel increased;
2. from 1984 to 1986 the fuel economy rose as the CAFE standard rose and the price of fuel decreased rapidly;
3. from 1986 to 1988 the fuel economy rose at a significantly subdued rate and eventually leveled off as the price of fuel fell and the CAFE standard was relaxed

before returning to 1986 levels in 1990. These are following by an extended period during which the passenger car CAFE standard, the observed average passenger car fuel economy, and the price of gasoline remained stable, and finally a period starting about 2003 when prices rose dramatically and fuel economy has slowly responded.

The law of supply and demand would predict that an increase in gasoline prices would lead in the long run to an increase in the average fuel economy of the U.S. passenger car fleet, and that a drop in gasoline prices would be associated with a reduction in the average fuel economy of the entire U.S. fleet. There is some evidence that this happened with an increase in market share of lower fuel economy light trucks and SUVs and decline in passenger car sales, as a percentage of total fleet sales, as car buying trends changed during the 1990s, the impact of which is not reflected in this chart. In the case of passenger cars, U.S. average fuel economy did not fall as economic theory would predict, suggesting that CAFE standards maintained the higher fuel economy of the passenger car fleet during the long period from the end of the 1979 energy crisis to the rise of gasoline prices in the early 2000s. Most recently, fuel economy has increased about one mpg from 2006 to 2007. This increase is due primarily to increased fuel efficiency of imported cars. Similarly, the law of supply and demand predicts that due to the United States' large percentage consumption of the world's oil supply, that increasing fuel economy would drive down the gasoline prices that U.S. consumers would otherwise have to pay. Reductions in petroleum demand in the United States helped create the collapse of OPEC market power in 1986.

The "CAFE" and "CAFE standard" shown here only regards new model passenger car fuel economy and target fuel economy (respectively) rather than the overall U.S. fuel economy average which tends to be dominated by used vehicles manufactured in previous years, new model light truck CAFE standards, light truck CAFE averages, or aggregate data.

== Calculation ==
Under CAFE regulations, a light vehicle's fuel economy, $f$, is determined as the weighted harmonic average of the values measured on the “city” (FTP-75) and “highway” (HWFET) drive cycles.

$f = \frac{1}{\frac{0.55}{f_{city}}+\frac{0.45}{f_{highway}}}$

$f$ has long been known to overestimate real-world fuel economy which, as of the 2022 model year, is typically 76 percent of $f$, and has gotten worse over its decades of use. $f$ is not the same as the Monroney window sticker value for consumer information.

Fleet fuel economy is calculated using a harmonic mean, not a simple arithmetic mean (average) – namely, the reciprocal of the average of the reciprocal values. For a fleet composed of four different kinds of vehicle A, B, C and D, produced in numbers n_{A}, n_{B}, n_{C} and n_{D}, with fuel economies f_{A}, f_{B}, f_{C} and f_{D}, the CAFE would be:

$\frac{n_A+n_B+n_C+n_D}{\frac{n_A}{f_A}+\frac{n_B}{f_B}+\frac{n_C}{f_C}+\frac{n_D}{f_D}}$

For example, a fleet of 4 vehicles getting 15, 13, 17, and 100 mpg has a CAFE of slightly less than 19 mpg:

$\frac{4}{\frac{1}{15}+\frac{1}{13}+\frac{1}{17}+\frac{1}{100}}=18.83$

While the arithmetic mean fuel economy of the fleet is just over 36 mpg:

$\frac{15+13+17+100}{4}=36.25$

The harmonic mean captures the fuel economy of driving each car in the fleet for the same number of miles, while the arithmetic mean captures the fuel economy of driving each car using the same amount of gas (i.e., the 13 mpg vehicle would travel 13 miles (21 km) with one gallon while the 100 mpg vehicle would travel 100 miles).

For the purposes of CAFE, a manufacturer's car output is divided into a domestic fleet (vehicles with more than 75 percent U.S., Canadian or post-NAFTA Mexican content) and a foreign fleet (everything else). Each of these fleets must separately meet the requirements. The two-fleet requirement was developed by the United Automobile Workers (UAW) as a means to ensure job creation in the United States. The UAW successfully lobbied Congress to write this provision into the enabling legislation – and continues to advocate this position. The two fleet rule for light trucks was removed in 1996.

For the fuel economy calculation for alternative fuel vehicles, a gallon of alternative fuel is deemed to contain 15% fuel (which is approximately the amount of gasoline in a gallon of E85) as an incentive to develop alternative fuel vehicles. The mileage for dual-fuel vehicles, such as E85 capable models and plug-in hybrid electric vehicles, is computed as the average of its alternative fuel rating—divided by 0.15 (equal to multiplying by 6.666)—and its gasoline rating. Thus an E85-capable vehicle that gets 15 mpg on E-85 and 25 mpg on gasoline might logically be rated at 20 mpg. But in fact the average, for CAFE purposes, despite perhaps only one percent of the fuel used in E85-capable vehicles is actually E85, is computed as 100 mpg for E-85 and the standard 25 mpg for gasoline, or 62.5 mpg. However, the total increase in a manufacturer's average fuel economy rating due to dual-fueled vehicles cannot exceed 1.2mpg. Section 32906 reduces the increase due to dual-fueled vehicles to 0 through 2020. Electric vehicles are also incentivized by the 0.15 fuel divisor, but are not subject to the 1.2 mpg cap like dual-fuel vehicles.

Manufacturers are also allowed to earn CAFE "credits" in any year they exceed CAFE requirements, which they may use to offset deficiencies in other years. CAFE credits can be applied to the three years before or the five years after the year in which they are earned. The reason for this flexibility is so manufacturers are penalized only for persistent failure to meet the requirements, not for transient non-compliance due to market conditions.

== History ==
Fuel economy regulations were first introduced in 1978, only for passenger vehicles. NHTSA kept CAFE standards for cars the same from 1985 to 2010, except for a slight decrease in required mpg from 1986 to 1989. The next year, a second category was defined for light trucks. These were distinguished from heavy duty vehicles by a gross vehicle weight rating (GVWR) of 6000 pounds or less. The GVWR threshold was raised to 8500 pounds in 1980 and has remained at that level through 2010. Thus certain large trucks and SUV's were exempt, such as the Hummer and the Ford Excursion. From 1979 to 1991, separate standards were established for two-wheel drive (2WD) and four-wheel drive (4WD) light trucks, but for most of this period, car makers were allowed to choose between these separate standards or a combined standard to be applied to the entire fleet of light trucks they sold that model year. In 1980 and 1981, respectively, a manufacturer whose light truck fleet was powered exclusively by basic engines which were not also used in passenger cars could meet standards of 14 mpg and 14.5 mpg.

=== Standards by model year, 1978–2021 ===
CAFE standards for each model year in miles per US gallon.
| Model Year | Passenger Cars | | Light Trucks |
| Model Year | Domestic | Import | 2WD | 4WD | Combined |
| 1978 | 18.0 | 18.0 |
| 1979 | 19.0 | 19.0 | 17.2 | 15.8 |
| 1980 | 20.0 | 20.0 | 16.0 | 14.0 |
| 1981 | 22.0 | 22.0 | 16.7 | 15.0 |
| 1982 | 24.0 | 24.0 | 18.0 | 16.0 | 17.5 |
| 1983 | 26.0 | 26.0 | 19.5 | 17.5 | 19.0 |
| 1984 | 27.0 | 27.0 | 20.3 | 18.5 | 20.0 |
| 1985 | 27.5 | 27.5 | 19.7 | 18.9 | 19.5 |
| 1986 | 26.0 | 26.0 | 20.5 | 19.5 | 20.0 |
| 1987 | 26.0 | 26.0 | 21.0 | 19.5 | 20.5 |
| 1988 | 26.0 | 26.0 | 21.0 | 19.5 | 20.5 |
| 1989 | 26.5 | 26.5 | 21.5 | 19.0 | 20.5 |
| 1990 | 27.5 | 27.5 | 20.5 | 19.0 | 20.0 |
| 1991 | 27.5 | 27.5 | 20.7 | 19.1 | 20.2 |
| 1992 | 27.5 | 27.5 | | | 20.2 |
| 1993 | 27.5 | 27.5 | | | 20.4 |
| 1994 | 27.5 | 27.5 | | | 20.5 |
| 1995 | 27.5 | 27.5 | | | 20.6 |
| 1996 (Note: Frozen by Public Law 104-50) | 27.5 | 27.5 | | | 20.7 |
| 1997 | 27.5 | 27.5 | | | 20.7 |
| 1998 | 27.5 | 27.5 | | | 20.7 |
| 1999 | 27.5 | 27.5 | | | 20.7 |
| 2000 | 27.5 | 27.5 | | | 20.7 |
| 2001 | 27.5 | 27.5 | | | 20.7 |
| 2002 | 27.5 | 27.5 | | | 20.7 |
| 2003 (Note: Funding restored for CAFE rulemaking by Public Law 107-87) | 27.5 | 27.5 | | | 20.7 |
| 2004 | 27.5 | 27.5 | | | 20.7 |
| 2005 | 27.5 | 27.5 | | | 21.0 |
| 2006 | 27.5 | 27.5 | | | 21.6 |
| 2007 | 27.5 | 27.5 | | | 22.2 |
| 2008 | 27.5 | 27.5 | | | 22.4 |
| 2009 | 27.5 | 27.5 | | | 23.0 |
| 2010 | 27.5 | 27.5 | | | 23.4 |
| 2011^{*} | 30.0 (27.8) | 30.4 | | | 24.3 |
| 2012^{*} | 32.7 (30.7) | 33.4 | | | 25.3 |
| 2013^{*} | 33.2 (31.4) | 33.9 | | | 25.9 |
| 2014^{*} | 34.0 (32.1) | 34.6 | | | 26.3 |
| 2015^{*} | 35.2 (33.3) | 35.8 | | | 27.6 |
| 2016^{*} | 36.5 (34.7) | 37.4 | | | 28.8 |
| 2017^{*} | 38.5 (36.7) | 39.6 | | | 29.4 |
| 2018^{*} | 39.8 (38.0) | 40.6 | | | 30.0 |
| 2019^{*} | 41.3 (39.4) | 42.1 | | | 30.4 |
| 2020^{*} | 42.4 (40.9) | 44.0 | | | 31.0 |
| 2021^{*} | 42.9 (39.9) | 44.4 | | | 31.5 |
* Production-weighed harmonic average of standards for all vehicles in that model year. The target curves and the MDPCS are the actual standards.

=== Performance in practice ===
Since 1980, the traditional Japanese manufacturers have increased their combined fleet average fuel economy by 1.6 miles per gallon according to the March 30, 2009, Summary of Fuel Economy Performance published annually by NHTSA. During this time, they also increased their sales in the United States by 221%. The traditional European manufacturers actually decreased their fleet average fuel economy by 2 miles per gallon while increasing their sales volume by 91%. The traditional U.S. manufacturers, Chrysler, Ford, and General Motors, increased their fleet average fuel economy by 4.1 miles per gallon since 1980 according to the government figures. During this time the sales of U.S. manufacturers decreased by 29%.

A number of manufacturers choose to pay CAFE penalties rather than attempt to comply with the regulations. These tend to be companies with small U.S. market share and expensive, high-performance vehicles, such as Porsche, Mercedes, and Fiat. In model year 2012, Jaguar (Land Rover) and Volvo did not meet CAFE requirements. They paid fines totaling 15 million dollars for the year.

For the 2014 model year, Mercedes SUVs followed by GM and Ford light trucks had the lowest fleet average while Tesla followed by Toyota and Mazda had the highest.

Before the oil price increases of the 2000s, overall fuel economy for both cars and light trucks in the U.S. market reached its highest level in 1987, when manufacturers managed 26.2 mpg (8.98 L/100 km). The average in 2004 was 24.6 mpg. In that time, vehicles increased in size from an average of 3,220 pounds to 4,066 pounds (1,461 kg to 1,844 kg), in part due to an increase in truck ownership from 28% to 53%.

=== 2006 reform attempt and lawsuit ===
The CAFE rules for trucks were officially amended at the end of March 2006. However, the 9th Circuit Court of Appeals has overturned the rules, returning them to NHTSA, as discussed below. These changes would have segmented truck fleets by vehicle size and class as of 2011. All SUVs and passenger vans up to 10,000 pounds GVWR would have had to comply with CAFE standards regardless of size, but pickup trucks and cargo vans over 8500 pounds gross vehicle weight rating (GVWR) would have remained exempt.

The United States Court of Appeals for the Ninth Circuit agreed with NHTSA that economic benefit-cost analysis (maximizing net economic benefits to the Nation) is, under the Energy Policy and Conservation Act (EPCA), an appropriate method to select the maximum feasible stringency of CAFE standards, but nonetheless found that NHTSA incorrectly set a value of zero dollars to the global warming damage caused by CO_{2} emissions; failed to set a "backstop" to prevent trucks from emitting more CO_{2} than in previous years; failed to set standards for vehicles in the 8,500 to 10,000 lb (4,500 kg) range; and failed to prepare a full Environmental Impact Statement (EIS) rather than a more abbreviated environmental impact assessment. The Court directed NHTSA to prepare a new standard as quickly as possible and to fully evaluate that new standard's impact on the environment.

=== Energy Independence and Security Act of 2007 ===
In 2007, the House and Senate passed the Energy Independence and Security Act (EISA) with broad support, setting a goal for the national fuel economy standard of 35 miles per gallon (mpg) by 2020 and rendering the court judgment obsolete. On December 19, 2007, President George W. Bush signed the bill. The bill's standard would increase the fuel economy standards by 40 percent and save the United States billions of gallons of fuel. The requirement applies to all passenger automobiles, including "light trucks." President Bush faced serious pressure to reduce the Nation's dependency on oil and this was part of his initiative to do so.

=== New "footprint" model ===
Under the new final light truck CAFE standard 2008–2011, fuel economy standards would have been restructured so that they are based on a measure of vehicle size called "footprint", the product of multiplying a vehicle's wheelbase by its track width. A target level of fuel economy would have been established for each increment in footprint using a continuous mathematical formula. Smaller footprint light trucks had higher fuel economy targets and larger trucks lower targets. Manufacturers who made more large trucks would have been allowed to meet a lower overall CAFE target, manufacturers who make more small trucks would have needed to meet a higher standard. Unlike previous CAFE standards there was no requirement for a manufacturer or the industry as a whole to meet any particular overall actual MPG target, since that will depend on the mix of sizes of trucks manufactured and ultimately purchased by consumers. Some critics pointed out that this might have had the unintended consequence of pushing manufacturers to make ever-larger vehicles to avoid strict economy standards. However, the equation used to calculate the fuel economy target had a built in mechanism that provides an incentive to reduce vehicle size to about 52 square feet (the approximate midpoint of the current light truck fleet.)

==== Increases and light truck standard reform ====
In 2006, the rule making for light trucks for model years 2008–2011 included a reform to the structure for CAFE standards for light trucks and gave manufacturers the option for model years 2008–2010 to comply with the reformed standard or to comply with the unreformed standard. The reformed standard was based on the vehicle footprint. The unreformed standard for MY 2008 was set to be 22.5mpg, 23.1mpg for MY 2009, and 23.5mpg for MY 2010.

To achieve the target of 35mpg authorized under EISA for the combined fleet of passenger cars and light truck for MY2020, NHTSA is required to continue raising the CAFE standards. In determining a new CAFE standard, NHTSA must assess the environmental impacts of each new standard and the effect of this standard on employment. With the EISA, NHTSA needed to take new analysis including taking a fresh look at the potential impacts under the National Environmental Policy Act (NEPA) and assessing whether or not the impacts are significant within the meaning of NEPA.

NHTSA has to issue its new standards eighteen months before the model year for fleet. According to NHTSA report, to achieve this industry wide combined fleet of at least 35mpg, NHTSA must set new standards well in advance of the model year so as to provide the automobile manufacturers with lead time enough to make extensive necessary changes in their automobiles. The EISA also called for a reform where the standards set by the Transportation Department would be are "attribute based" so as to ensure that the safety of vehicles is not compromised for higher standards.

==== CAFE credit trading provisions ====
The 2007 Energy Independence and Security Act also instructed NHTSA to establish a credit trading and transferring scheme to allow manufacturers to transfer credits between categories, as well as sell them to other manufacturers or non-manufacturers. In addition, the period over which credits could be carried forward was extended from three years to five. Traded or transferred credits may not be used to meet the minimum standard in the domestic passenger car fleet, however they may be used to meet the "attribute standard". This latter allowance has drawn criticism from the UAW which fears it will lead manufacturers to increase the importation of small cars to offset shortfalls in the domestic market.

These new flexibilities were implemented by regulation on March 23, 2009, in the Final Rule for 2011 Model Year Passenger Cars and Light Trucks.

Calculations using official CAFE data, and the newly proposed credit trading flexibility contained in the September 28, 2009, Notice of Proposed Rulemaking show that ninety-eight percent of the benefit derived from just the cross fleet credit trading provision flows to Toyota. According to these calculations 75% of the benefit from the two new CAFE credit trading provisions, cross fleet trading and five-year carry-forward, falls to foreign manufacturers. Toyota can use the provision to avoid or reduce compliance on average by 0.69 mpg per year through 2020,

- Hyundai (1.01 mpg),
- Nissan (0.65),
- Honda (0.83 mpg),
- Mitsubishi (0.13 mpg),
- Subaru (0.08),
- Chrysler (0.14 mpg),
- GM (0.09 mpg), and
- Ford (0.18 mpg) also benefit.

The estimated value of the CAFE exemption gained by Toyota is $2.5 billion; Honda's benefit is worth $800 million, and Nissan's benefit is valued at $900 million in reduced CAFE compliance costs. Foreign companies gained $5.5 billion in benefits compared with the $1.8 billion that went to the Detroit Three.

==== Out-year and alternative fuel standard changes ====
In the years 2021 to 2030, the standards requires MPG to be the "maximum feasible" fuel economy. The law allows NHTSA to issue additional requirements for cars and trucks based on the footprint model or other mathematical standard. Additionally, each manufacturer must meet a minimum standard of the higher of either 27.5 mpg for passenger automobiles or 92% of the projected average for all manufacturers. National Highway Traffic Safety Administration (NHTSA) is directed based on National Academy of Sciences studies to set medium and heavy-duty truck MPG standards to the "maximum feasible". Additionally, the law phases out the mpg credit previously granted to E85 flexible-fuel vehicle manufacturers and adds in one for biodiesel, and it adds a requirement that NHTSA publish replacement tire fuel efficiency ratings. The bill also adds support for initial state and local infrastructure for plug-in electric vehicles.

==== Implementing regulations ====
On April 22, 2008, NHTSA responded to the Energy Independence and Security Act of 2007 with proposed new fuel economy standards for cars and trucks effective model year 2011.

The new rules also introduce the "footprint" model for cars as well as trucks, where if a manufacturer makes more large cars and trucks they will be allowed to meet a lower standard for fuel economy. This means that an overall fuel efficiency for a particular manufacturer nor the fleet as a whole cannot be predicted with certainty since it will depend on the actual product mix manufactured. However, if the product mix is as NHTSA predicts, car fuel economy would increase from a current standard of 27.5 mpg_{‑US} (8.6 L/100 km; 33.0 mpg_{‑imp}) to 31.0 mpg_{‑US} (7.6 L/100 km; 37.2 mpg_{‑imp}) in 2011. The new regulations are designed to be "optimized" with respect to a certain set of assumptions which include: gas prices in 2016 will be $2.25 a U.S. gallon (59.4¢/L), all new car purchasers will pay 7% interest rates on their vehicles purchases, and only care about fuel costs for the first 5 years of a vehicle's life, and that the social cost of carbon is $7 per tonne of CO_{2}. This corresponds to a global warming value of $4.31 savings a year per car under the new regulations. Further, the new regulations assume that no advanced hybrids (Toyota Prius), plug-in hybrids and extended range electric vehicles (Chevrolet Volt), electric cars (Th!nk City), nor alternative fuel vehicles (Honda Civic GX) will be used to achieve these fuel economies. The proposal again explained that U.S. law (49 U.S. Code § 32919) requires that "a State or a political subdivision of a State may not adopt or enforce a law or regulation related to fuel economy standards or average fuel economy standards", and explained that laws or regulations applicable to motor vehicle greenhouse gas emissions are related to fuel economy standards.

In mid-October 2008, DOT completed and released a final environmental impact statement in anticipation of issuing standards for model years 2011–2015. Based on its consideration of the public comments and other available information, including information on the financial condition of the automotive industry, the agency adjusted its analysis and the standards and prepared a final rule and Final Regulatory Impact Analysis (FRIA) for MYs 2011–2015. On November 14, 2008, the Office of Management and Budget concluded review of the rule and FRIA. However, issuance of the final rule was held in abeyance. On January 7, 2009, the Department of Transportation announced that the final rule would not be issued, writing: "The Bush Administration will not finalize its rulemaking on Corporate Fuel Economy Standards. The recent financial difficulties of the automobile industry will require the next administration to conduct a thorough review of matters affecting the industry, including how to effectively implement the Energy Independence and Security Act of 2007 (EISA). The National Highway Traffic Safety Administration has done significant work that will position the next Transportation Secretary to finalize a rule before the April 1, 2009 deadline."

=== 2009 Obama administration directive ===
On January 27, 2009, President Barack Obama directed the Department of Transportation to review relevant legal, technological, and scientific considerations associated with establishing more stringent fuel economy standards, and to finalize the 2011 model year standard by the end of March. This single-model year standard was issued March 27, 2009, and is about one mpg lower than the fuel economy standards previously recommended under the Bush Administration. "These standards are important steps in the nation's quest to achieve energy independence and bring more fuel efficient vehicles to American families", said Secretary LaHood. The new standards will raise the industry-wide combined average to 27.3 miles per US gallon (8.6 L/100 km; 32.8 mpg_{‑imp}) (a 2.0 mpg_{‑US} (2.4 mpg_{‑imp}) increase over the 2010 model year average), as estimated by the National Highway Traffic Safety Administration (NHTSA). It will save about 887,000,000 U.S. gallons (3.36×10^{9} L) of fuel and reduce carbon dioxide emissions by 8.3 million metric tons. This 2011 single-year standard will use an attribute-based system, which sets fuel economy standards for individual vehicle models, based on the footprint model. Secretary LaHood also noted that work on the multi-year fuel economy plan for model years after 2011 is already well underway. The review will include an evaluation of fuel-saving technologies, market conditions and future product plans from the manufacturers. The effort will be coordinated with interested stakeholders and other federal agencies, including the Environmental Protection Agency. The new rules were immediately challenged in court again by the Center for Biological Diversity as not addressing the inadequacies found by the previous court rulings.

Projected MY2011 CAFE Under Different Rules
| | 2006 Bush Rule 71 FR 17565 | 2008 Bush Proposed Rule 73 FR 24351 | 2009 Obama Final Rule 74 FR 14196 |
|---|---|---|---|
| Passenger Cars | | 31.2 | 30.2 |
| Light Trucks | 24.0 | 25.0 | 24.1 |
| Combined Fleet | | 27.8 | 27.3 |

=== Model year 2012–2016 Obama administration proposal ===
On May 19, 2009, President Barack Obama proposed a new national fuel economy program which adopts uniform federal standards to regulate both fuel economy and greenhouse gas emissions while preserving the legal authorities of DOT, EPA and California. The program covered model year 2012 to model year 2016 and ultimately required an average fuel economy standard of 35.5 miles per US gallon (6.63 L/100 km; 42.6 mpg_{‑imp}) in 2016 (of 39 miles per gallon for cars and 30 mpg for trucks), a jump from the 2009 average for all vehicles of 25 miles per gallon. Obama said, "The status quo is no longer acceptable." The higher fuel economy was projected to reduce oil consumption by approximately 1.8 billion barrels (290,000,000 m^{3}) over the life of the program and reduce greenhouse gas emissions by approximately 900 million metric tons; the expected consumer costs in terms of higher car prices was unknown. Ten car companies and the UAW embraced the national program because it provided certainty and predictability to 2016 and included flexibilities that would significantly reduce the cost of compliance. Stated goals for the program included: saving consumers money over the long term in increased fuel efficiency, preserving consumer choice (the new rules do not dictate the size of cars, trucks and SUVs that manufacturers can produce; rather it requires that all sizes of vehicles become more energy efficient), reduced air pollution in the form of greenhouse gas emissions and other conventional pollutants, one national policy for all automakers instead of three standards (a DOT standard, an EPA standard and a California standard that would apply to 13 other states), and industry desires: clarity, predictability and certainty concerning the rules while giving them flexibility on how to meet the expected outcomes and the lead time they need to innovate. The policy was expected to result in yearly 5% increases in efficiency from 2012 through 2016, 1.8 billion barrels (290,000,000 m^{3}) of oil saved cumulatively over the lifetime of the program and significant reductions in greenhouse gas emissions equivalent to taking 177 million of today's cars off the road.

By model year 2014, many of the program's goals were being met. The average new vehicle fuel economy was 30.7 mpg (35.6 mpg for cars and 25.5 mpg for trucks) and for the years 2012–2015, auto industry outperformed the GHG standard by a substantial margin. Consumers are expected to save an estimated 16.6 billion gallons of fuel over the lifetime of model year 2011 to 2014 vehicles due to the manufacturers exceeding the CAFE standards in those years.

=== 2011 agreement for model years 2017–2025 ===
On July 29, 2011, President Obama announced an agreement with thirteen large automakers to increase fuel economy to 54.5 miles per gallon for cars and light-duty trucks by model year 2025. He was joined by Ford, GM, Chrysler, BMW, Honda, Hyundai, Jaguar/Land Rover, Kia, Mazda, Mitsubishi, Nissan, Toyota, and Volvo—which together accounted for over 90% of all vehicles sold in the United States—as well as the United Auto Workers (UAW), and the State of California, who were all participants in the deal. The agreement resulted in new CAFE regulations for model year 2017–2025 vehicles, which were finalized on August 28, 2012. The major increases in stringency and the changes in the structure of CAFE create a need for research that incorporates the demand and supply sides of the new vehicle market in a more detailed manner than was needed with static fuel economy standards.

Volkswagen responded to the July 29, 2011, agreement with the following statement: "Volkswagen does not endorse the proposal under discussion. It places an unfairly high burden on passenger cars, while allowing special compliance flexibility for heavier light trucks. Passenger cars would be required to achieve 5% annual improvements, and light trucks 3.5% annual improvements. The largest trucks carry almost no burden for the 2017–2020 timeframe, and are granted numerous ways to mathematically meet targets in the outlying years without significant real-world gains. The proposal encourages manufacturers and customers to shift toward larger, less efficient vehicles, defeating the goal of reduced greenhouse gas emissions." Additionally, Volkswagen has since approached U.S. lawmakers about lowering their proposal to double fuel efficiency for passenger cars by 2025. Volkswagen at the time claimed that the new plan was unfair, but the company was later revealed to have been systematically cheating emissions tests. As a result, Volkswagen is one of the only major auto manufacturers to not sign the agreement that has led to the current proposal from the Obama administration. Daimler, producer of Mercedes-Benz brand automobiles, expressed similar views, saying it "clearly favors large SUVs and pickup trucks."

=== 2016 mid-term review ===
The 2011 agreement set up requirements for a mid-term review to look at how the industry was progressing with the new standards. On July 18, 2016, the EPA, NHTSA and the California Air Resources Board (CARB) released a technical paper assessing whether or not the auto industry would be able to reach the 2022 to 2025 mpg standards. The Draft Technical Assessment Report, as the paper is called, is the first step in the mid-term evaluation process.

The government groups found that the auto industry had been successfully innovating and pushing towards lowering greenhouse gas emissions. The paper said that the technology was cheaper or about what was expected in terms of cost, and that automakers were adopting new technologies quicker than expected. Still, the paper said that the 54.5 mpg-equivalent projection is unrealistic. That goal was based on a market that was 67 percent cars and 33 percent trucks and SUVs and higher fuel prices, but American customers weren't buying that many cars, as the market was still about 50/50 and was likely to stay that way. The paper said more realistic projections are 50 mpg to 52.6 if the 2012 standards are maintained.

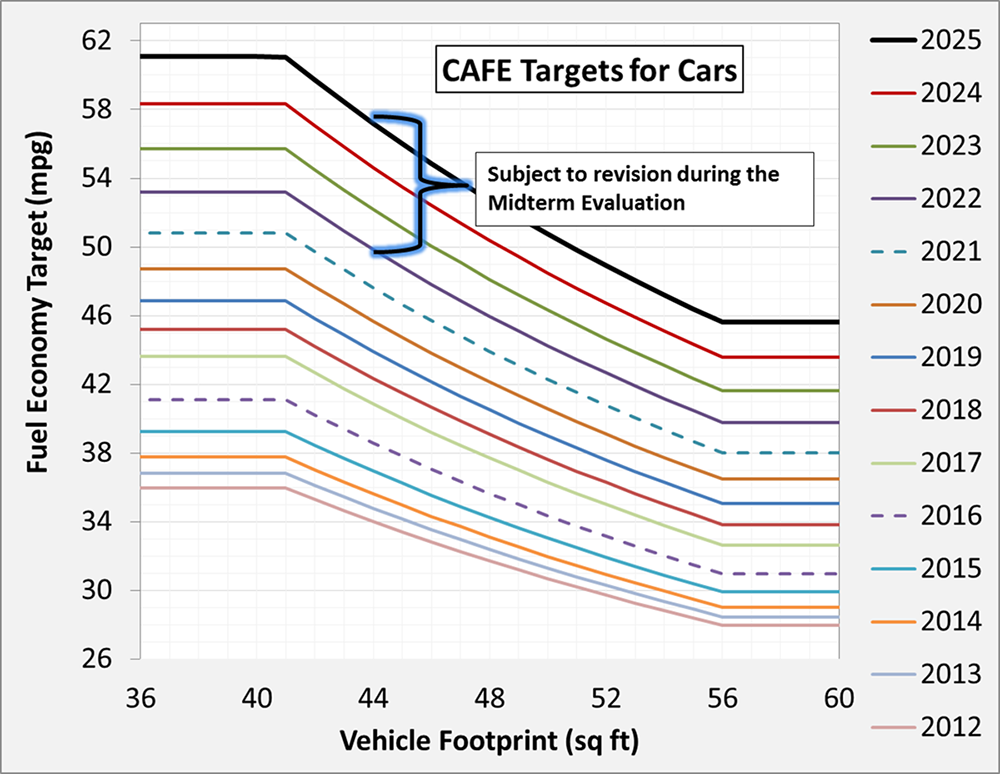
2012 to 2025 CAFE targets for cars

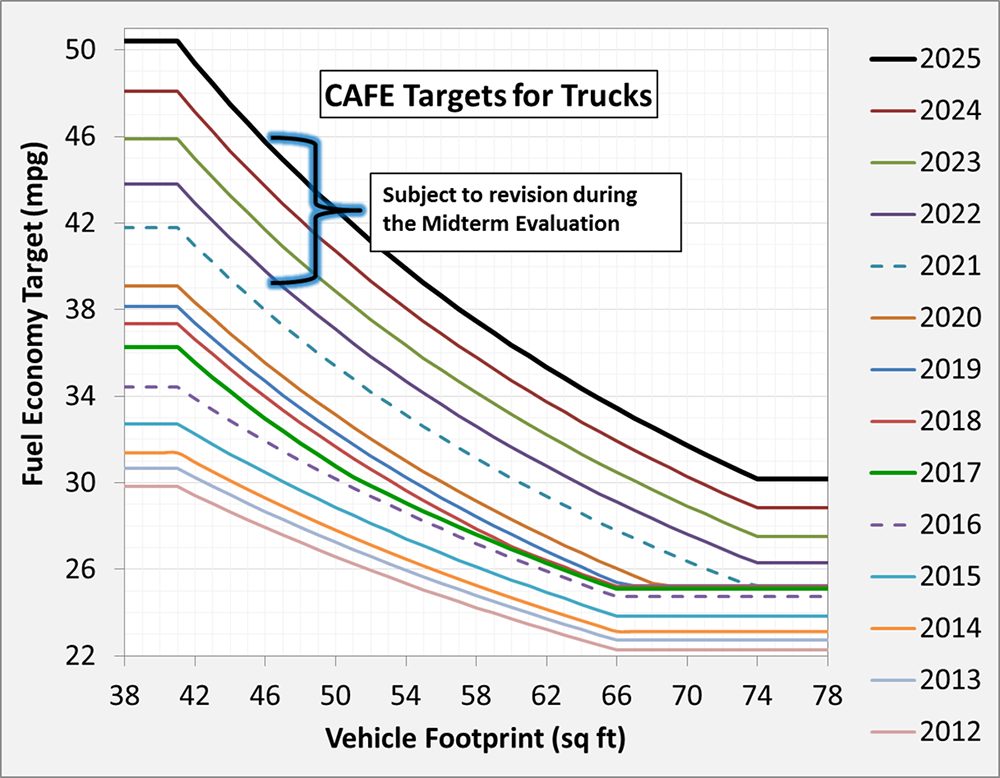
2012 to 2025 CAFE targets for light trucks

==== Agreed standards by model year, 2012–2025 ====
2012–2025 CAFE standards for each model year in miles per gallon. (selected values)
| Model Year | Passenger Cars | | | Light Trucks |
| Model Year | footprint ≤ 41 ft^{2} (e.g., 2015 Honda Fit) | footprint = 49 ft^{2} (e.g., Toyota Camry (XV70) ) | footprint ≥ 56 ft^{2} (e.g., Mercedes-Benz S-Class) | footprint ≤ 41 ft^{2} (e.g., Chevy S10) | footprint = 54 ft^{2} (e.g., Ford Ranger T6) | footprint = 67 ft^{2} | footprint ≥ 74 ft^{2} (e.g., Ford F-150 w/ext. cab & 8-foot bed) |
| 2012 | 35.95 | 31.19 | 27.95 | 29.82 | 25.35 | 22.27 | 22.27 |
| 2013 | 36.80 | 31.83 | 28.46 | 30.67 | 25.96 | 22.74 | 22.74 |
| 2014 | 37.75 | 32.54 | 29.03 | 31.38 | 26.47 | 23.13 | 23.13 |
| 2015 | 39.24 | 33.64 | 29.90 | 32.72 | 27.42 | 23.85 | 23.85 |
| 2016 | 41.09 | 34.99 | 30.96 | 34.42 | 28.60 | 24.74 | 24.74 |
| 2017 | 43.61 | 36.99 | 32.65 | 36.26 | 29.07 | 25.09 | 25.09 |
| 2018 | 45.21 | 38.34 | 33.84 | 37.36 | 29.65 | 25.20 | 25.20 |
| 2019 | 46.87 | 39.74 | 35.07 | 38.15 | 30.25 | 25.25 | 25.25 |
| 2020 | 48.74 | 41.33 | 36.47 | 39.11 | 31.01 | 25.69 | 25.25 |
Replaced March 30, 2020:
| 2021 | 50.83 | 43.09 | 38.02 | 41.80 | 33.12 | 27.43 | 25.25 |
| 2022 | 53.21 | 45.10 | 39.79 | 43.80 | 34.70 | 28.73 | 26.29 |
| 2023 | 55.71 | 47.20 | 41.64 | 45.89 | 36.34 | 30.08 | 27.53 |
| 2024 | 58.32 | 49.41 | 43.58 | 48.09 | 38.07 | 31.50 | 28.83 |
| 2025 | 61.07 | 51.72 | 45.61 | 50.39 | 39.88 | 32.99 | 30.19 |

NB: Real-world fuel economy values are about 20 percent lower than laboratory values used for CAFE. Use of E10 decreases fuel economy further by about 3 percent.

Additionally, there were minimum standards since EISA for domestically produced passenger automobiles being the greater of 27.5 mpg or 92 percent of the CAFE projected by the secretary of transportation for the combined domestic and non-domestic passenger automobile fleets manufactured for that model year.

=== 2020 rollback ===
In early August 2018, the EPA and Department of Transportation, then operating under the Presidency of Donald Trump, issued a proposed ruling that, if enacted, would roll back some of the goals set in 2012 under President Obama. It proposed freezing the fuel economy goals to the 2021 target of 37 mpg, would halt requirements on the production of hybrid and electric cars, and would eliminate the legal waiver that allows states like California to set more stringent standards. The EPA acting administrator Andrew R. Wheeler and the transportation secretary Elaine Chao issued a joint statement stating that the rule change was needed as the current rules "impose significant costs on American consumers and eliminate jobs", while the new rules "give consumers greater access to safer, more affordable vehicles, while continuing to protect the environment". The proposal included a withdrawal of the waiver that granted California the ability to set its own GHG and ZEV (Zero Emission Vehicle) standards and that allowed other States to adopt the standard instead of the federal standard. Following publication of the proposed rule changes, California and eighteen other states announced that should the rule be enacted, they would sue the government to reject the rule.

The new ruling proposed by the EPA and NHTSA was named the Safer Affordable Fuel-Efficient (SAFE) Vehicle Rules. It aimed to set new CAFE standards for MY 2022–2026 passenger car and light trucks and amend the 2021 MY CAFE standards because they are "no longer maximum feasible standards." The safety reason provided by the government was to shift people to buying new vehicles once the vehicles become more affordable under SAFE standards, with a government study conducted to show new model year vehicles were associated with lower fatality rates. After releasing the proposal on August 2, 2018, NHTSA and EPA held a comment hearing period for 60 days. The deadline was later extended to October 26, 2018, after requests from 32 US senators, 18 state attorneys general, and others for a 120-day or longer comment period were received.

Researchers described in a December 2018 article in Science fundamental flaws and inconsistencies in the analysis justifying the proposed rule including miscalculating changes in the size of the automobile fleet and ignoring international benefits of reduced greenhouse gas emissions, thereby discarding at least $112 billion in benefits, and also by overestimating compliance costs and characterized such changes in the Notice of Proposed Rulemaking as misleading.

New CAFE targets went into effect in June 2020 beginning with the 2021 model year, increasing at a rate of 1.5 percent per year, far lower than the nearly 5 percent increase they replace. Additionally, the minimum standard for domestic passenger cars was lowered from the 2020 model year level until the 2023 MY.

=== Updates under Biden administration ===
Upon taking office, the administration of President Biden stated an intention to set new fuel efficiency standards. In August 2021 NHTSA released its Notice of Proposed Rulemaking offering new standards for the 2024–2026 model years.

The final rule covering the 2024–2026 model years was signed on March 31, 2022. Fuel economy targets for cars and light trucks each increase 8 percent for 2024 MY, 8 percent for 2025 MY, and 10 percent for 2026 MY. NHTSA projects that the updated targets lead to an industry-wide average of 49 MPG by the 2026 model year given a fleet mix of 48 percent passenger cars and 52 percent light trucks. Additionally, since by law, the minimum domestic passenger car standard (MDPCS) is "92 percent of the average fuel economy projected by the Secretary for the combined domestic and non-domestic passenger automobile fleets," they are also updated. However, NHTSA is retaining a "1.9 percent offset" to the MDPCS because of past undercompliance with the standard, keeping a roll back of the Trump administration.

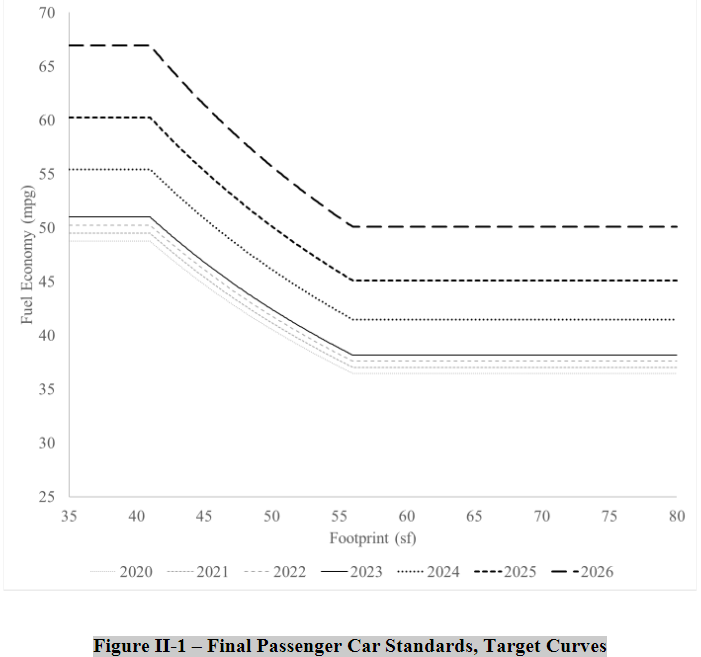
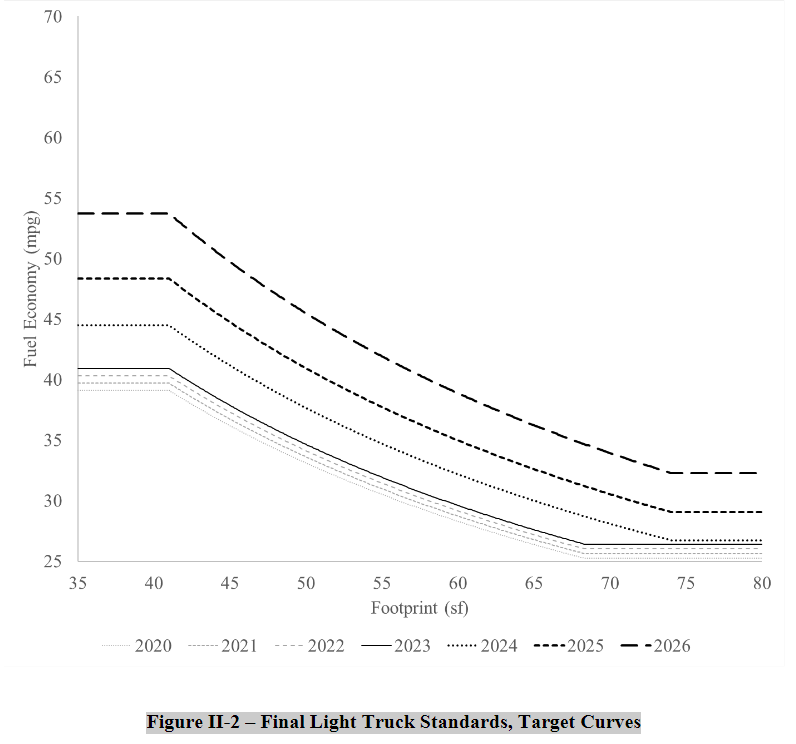
Continuous functions of updated attribute-based targets as published in the March 31, 2022, Final Rule

2021–2026 CAFE targets for each model year in miles per gallon. (selected values only)
| Model Year | Passenger Cars | | | Light Trucks |
| Model Year | footprint ≤ 41 ft^{2} (e.g., 2015 Honda Fit) | footprint = 49 ft^{2} (e.g., Toyota Camry (XV70) ) | footprint ≥ 56 ft^{2} (e.g., Mercedes-Benz S-Class) | footprint ≤ 41 ft^{2} (e.g., Chevy S10) | footprint = 54 ft^{2} (e.g., Ford Ranger T6) | footprint = 67 ft^{2} | footprint ≥ 74 ft^{2} (e.g., Ford F-150 w/ext. cab & 8-foot bed) |
| 2021 | 49.48 | 41.99 | 37.05 | 39.71 | 31.49 | 26.09 | 25.63 |
| 2022 | 50.21 | 42.57 | 37.59 | 40.29 | 31.94 | 26.46 | 26.02 |
| 2023 | 50.99 | 43.23 | 38.16 | 40.93 | 32.46 | 26.89 | 26.42 |
| 2024 | 55.42 | 46.98 | 41.48 | 44.48 | 35.26 | 29.21 | 26.74 |
| 2025 | 60.26 | 51.13 | 45.12 | 48.32 | 38.31 | 31.73 | 29.07 |
| 2026 | 66.95 | 56.77 | 50.10 | 53.73 | 42.61 | 35.30 | 32.31 |

On July 28, 2023 NHTSA proposed new fuel economy targets for light-duty vehicles for the 2027—2031 model years, as well as heavy-duty trucks and vans for the 2030—2035 model years. The preferred alternative calls for 2 percent annual increases for cars, 4 percent for light trucks, and 10 percent for heavy-duty trucks and vans, among other regulatory changes.

=== Effective elimination in 2025 budget bill ===
In the One Big Beautiful Bill Act signed by President Trump on July 4, 2025, fines for missing CAFE standards were eliminated, effectively mooting the standards.

== Active debate ==
There has been debate on the safety, costs, and impact of the CAFE program.

=== Effect on traffic safety ===
NHTSA has expressed concerns that automotive manufacturers would increase mileage by reducing vehicle weight, which might lead to weight disparities in the vehicle population and increased danger for occupants of lighter vehicles. According to the Insurance Institute for Highway Safety (IIHS) in May 2020, "the smallest late-model cars remain the most dangerous, according to the most recent driver death rates."

A National Research Council report found that the standards implemented in the 1970s and 1980s "probably resulted in an additional 1,300 to 2,600 traffic fatalities in 1993." A Harvard Center for Risk Analysis study found that CAFE standards led to "2,200 to 3,900 additional fatalities to motorists per year." The Insurance Institute for Highway Safety's 2007 data show a correlation of about 250–500 fatalities per year per MPG.

In a 2007 analysis, IIHS found that 50 percent of fatalities in small four-door vehicles were single-vehicle crashes, compared to 83 percent in very large SUVs. The Mini Cooper had a driver fatality rate of 68 per million vehicle-years (multi-vehicle, single-vehicle, & rollover) compared to 115 for the Ford Excursion, which has a high proportion of fatalities from vehicle rollover. The Toyota Matrix was even lower at 44, while the rollover-prone Chevrolet S-10 Blazer 2 door was 232. The Nissan 350Z sports car (193) and the mechanically similar Nissan Altima sedan (79) show that driving style can't be isolated from engineering in these results. The analysis' conclusions include findings that death rates generally are higher in lighter vehicles, but cars almost always have lower death rates than SUVs or pickup trucks of comparable weight.

Against this evidence, proponents of higher CAFE standards argue that it is the "footprint" model of CAFE for trucks that encourages production of larger trucks with concomitant increases in vehicle weight disparities. A 2005 IIHS plot shows that in collisions between SUVs weighing 3,500 lb (1,600 kg) and cars, the car driver is more than 4 times more likely to be killed, and if the SUV weighs over 5,000 lb (2,300 kg) the car driver is 9 times more likely to be killed, with 16 percent of deaths occurring in car-to-car crashes and 18 percent in car-to-truck crashes. Recent studies find about 75 percent of two-vehicle fatalities involve a truck, and about half these fatalities involve a side-impact crash. Risk to the driver of the other vehicle is almost 10 times higher when the vehicle is a one-ton pickup compared to an imported car.

Proponents of higher CAFE standards also argue that the quality of the engineering design is the prime determinant of vehicular safety, not the vehicle's mass. In 2006, IIHS found that some of the smallest cars have good crash safety, and others do not. A 2003 Transportation Research Board study show greater safety disparities among vehicles of differing price, country of origin, and quality than among vehicles of different size and weight. A 2006 study discounts the importance of vehicle mass to traffic safety, pointing instead to the quality of engineering design as the primary factor.

=== Economic arguments ===
A survey by Consumer Reports's National Research Center found that higher fuel prices drove customers to seek more fuel-efficient vehicles.

The law of supply and demand predicts an increase in gasoline prices would lead in the long run to an increase in the average fuel economy of the U.S. passenger car fleet, and that a drop in gasoline prices would be associated with a reduction in the average fuel economy of the entire U.S. fleet.

Rather than mandating fuel economy increases, Charles Krauthammer advocated using a significant increase in gasoline taxes that would be revenue-neutral for the government. CAFE advocates assert that most of the gains in fuel economy over the past 30 years can be attributed to the standard itself.

Economic research in 2015 concludes that firms are shown to be more incentivized toward innovations on fuel economy while the expenses of other safety considerations are undetermined.

According to the Transportation Research Board, the weakening of 2022-2025 CAFE standards would make it much harder for the U.S. to avoid a two-degree-Celsius global warming scenario as per the Paris Agreement, meaning substantial more effort would have to be made between 2025 and 2050 if the SAFE standard is administrated to halt the original CAFE regulations.

A study has found that the adoption of CAFE standards, if supported together by government incentives, would accelerate the electric vehicle market. The U.S. could be less dependent on fossil fuels from the shift to EV market adoption.

=== Automaker viewpoints ===
In the May 6, 2007, edition of Autoline Detroit, GM vice-chairman Bob Lutz, an automobile designer/executive of BMW and Big Three fame, asserted that the CAFE standard was a failure and said it was like trying to fight obesity by requiring tailors to make only small-sized clothes. (Note: This was said before the footprint-based standards were implemented.)

In late 2007, Lutz called hybrid gasoline-electric vehicles the "ideal solution".

Automakers have said that small, fuel-efficient vehicles cost the auto industry billions of dollars. They cost almost as much to design and market but cannot be sold for as much as larger vehicles such as SUVs, because consumers expect small cars to be inexpensive.

Former GM chairman Rick Wagoner admitted in 2008 not knowing which fuel efficiency technologies consumers really want, he said "we are moving fast with technologies like E‑85 (ethanol), all-electric, fuel cells, and a wide range of hybrid offers".

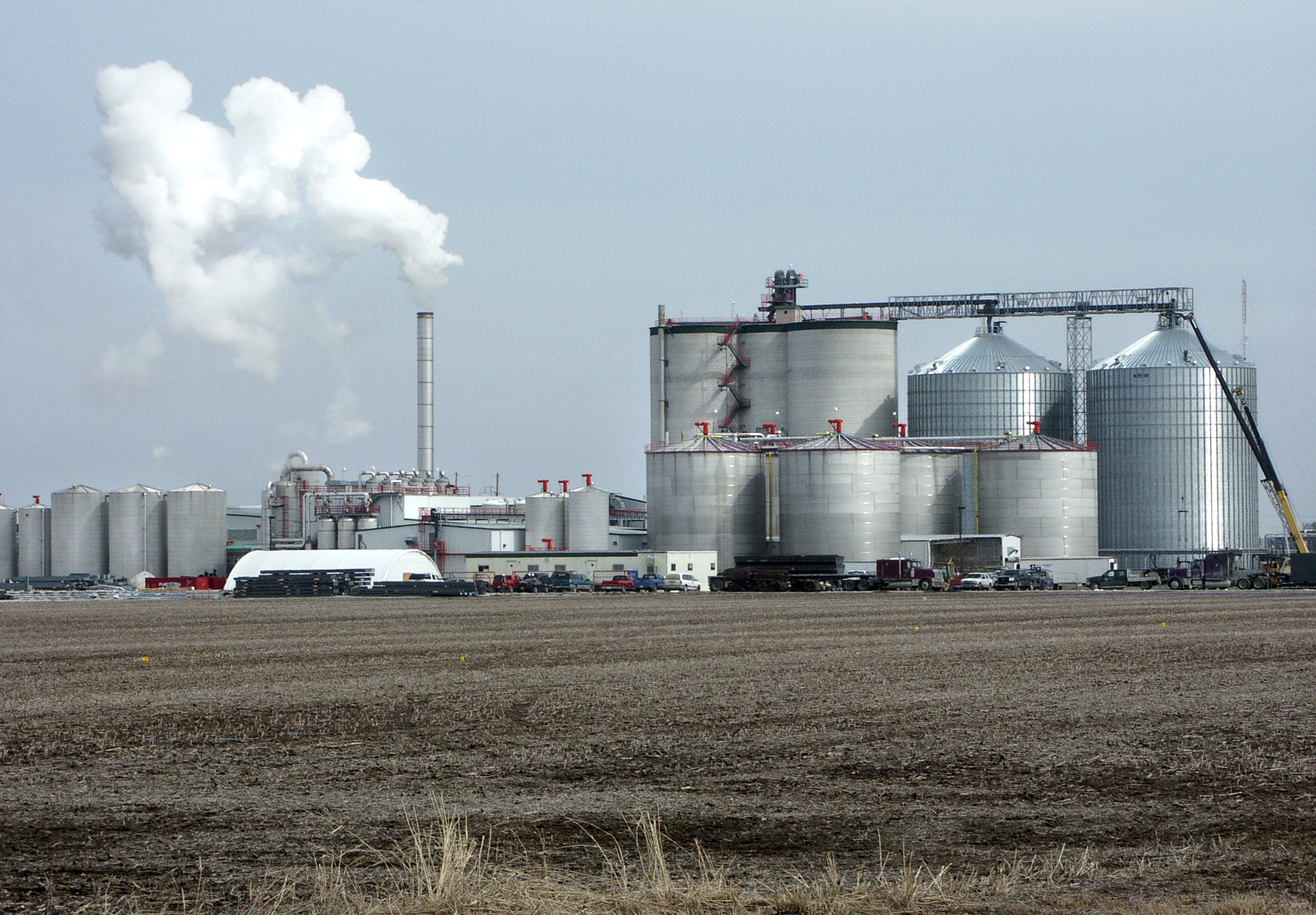
Ethanol plant

Ethanol fuel being studied by GM and other manufacturers, has a "gasoline gallon equivalency" (GGE) value of 1.5, i.e. to replace the energy of 1 volume of gasoline, 1.5 times the volume of ethanol is needed. To overcome this fact, Congress enacted The Alternative Motor Fuels Act (AMFA) in 1988 to gain CAFE credits for the manufacture of flexible-fuel vehicles. The formula using an example is: alternative fuel vehicle that achieves 15 mpg fuel economy while operating on alcohol would have a CAFE calculated as follows: Fuel Economy = (1/(0.15 AMFA factor)) x (15mpg) = 100 miles per gallon, providing a very healthy economic incentive for manufacturers of ethanol vehicles.

NHTSA's public records show in 2005 that automakers publicly expressed doubts as to the economic practicality and feasibility of increased light truck CAFE standards.

Toyota has invested heavily in developing the complex Hybrid Synergy Drive system, which allows the company to meet CAFE targets.

Volkswagen embraced the rising CAFE standards and tailored its US product line with a fleet of economical, popular, inexpensive diesel vehicles, beginning in 2009. In 2014 Volkswagen registered an impressive CAFE of 34 mpg_{‑US} (6.9 L/100 km; 41 mpg_{‑imp}). The company even received green car subsidies and tax exemptions in the US. This result was achieved by installing a defeat device in the electronic control unit of each vehicle, in what is now known as the 2015 Volkswagen emissions scandal.

Tesla, a firm that makes vehicles like the 142 miles per gallon gasoline equivalent Tesla Model 3 Standard Range Plus, earned $428 Million in AMFA CAFE Credits paid to it by other manufacturers in Q2 2020, a new record.

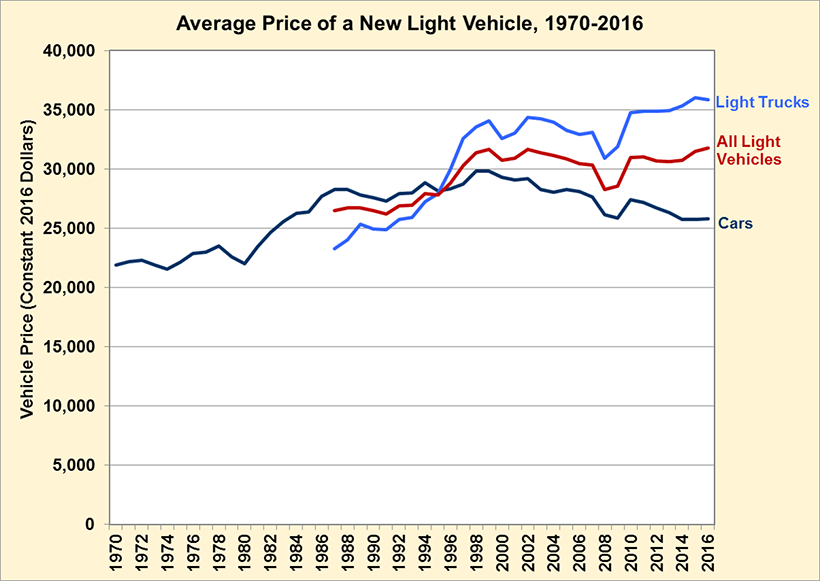
Light Vehicle Prices

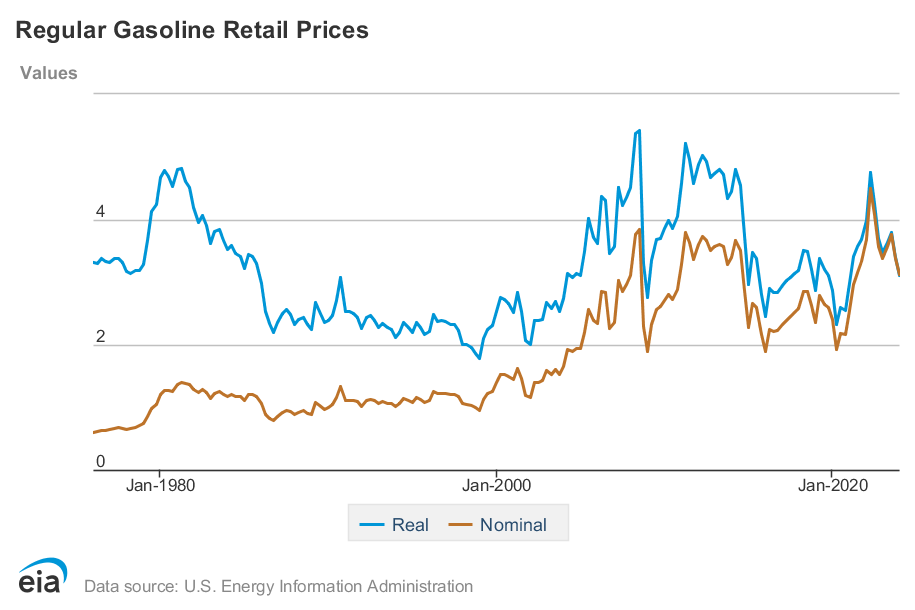
Regular Gasoline Prices

=== Consumer preferences ===
The Insurance Companies' Highway Loss Data Institute publishes data showing that larger vehicles are more expensive to insure, so forcing consumers to purchase smaller vehicles is in their best interest.

Automotive enthusiasts decry the Malaise era of auto design, partially brought on by CAFE. Some consumers felt so strongly, that by 1985, 66,900 individuals purchased vehicles in the grey market to avoid the sluggish, unreliable vehicles mandated by the government. In 2003, Alliance of Automobile Manufacturers spokesman Eron Shosteck noted that automakers produce more than 30 models rated at 30 mpg or more for the U.S. market, and they are poor sellers, indicating that consumers do not prioritize fuel economy.

In 2004, GM retiree Charles Amann said that consumers do not pick the weak-performing vehicle when given a choice of engines.

Vehicle safety ratings are now made available to consumers by NHTSA. and by the Insurance Institute for Highway Safety.

A 2006 Consumer Reports survey concluded fuel economy is the most important consideration in consumers' choice of vehicle, and a 2007 Pew Charitable Trusts survey found that nine out of ten Americans favor tougher CAFE standards, including 91% of Democrats and 85% of Republicans. In 2007, the 55 mpg Toyota Prius outsold the top-selling SUV, the 17 mpg Ford Explorer. In 1999, USA Today reported small cars tend to depreciate faster than larger cars, so they are worth less in value to the consumer over time. However, 2007 Edmunds depreciation data show that some small cars, primarily premium models, are among the best in holding their value.

=== SUVs and minivans created due to original mandate ===
CAFE standards signaled the end of the traditional long station wagon, but Chrysler CEO Lee Iacocca developed the idea of marketing the minivan as a station wagon alternative, while certifying it in the separate truck category to allow compliance with less-strict CAFE standards. Eventually, this same idea led to the promotion of the SUV.

The definitions for cars and trucks are not the same for fuel economy and emission standards. For example, a Chrysler PT Cruiser was defined as a car for emissions purposes and a truck for fuel economy purposes. Under the light truck fuel economy rules, the PT Cruiser had a lower fuel economy target (28.05 mpg beginning in 2011) than it would if it were classified as a passenger car.

=== Increased automobile usage ===
Emissions of carbon dioxide into the atmosphere, by source

As fuel efficiency rises, people may drive their cars more, which can mitigate some of fuel savings and the decrease in carbon dioxide emissions from the higher standards. According to the National Academies Report (Page 19) a 10% improvement in fuel efficiency leads to an average increase in travel distance of 1–2%. This phenomenon is referred to as the "rebound effect". The report stated (page 20) that the fuel efficiency improvements of light-duty vehicles have reduced the overall U.S. emissions of CO_{2} by 7%.

=== Technological considerations ===
There are a large number of technologies that manufacturers can apply to improve fuel efficiency short of implementing hybrid or plug-in hybrid technologies. Applied aggressively, at a cost of a few thousand dollars per vehicle, the National Research Council estimated that these technologies can almost double fuel economy versus a 2008 model year baseline vehicle.

Some technologies, such as multi-valve cylinders, are already widely applied in cars, but not trucks. Manufacturers dispute how effective these technologies are, their retail price, and how willing customers are to pay for these improvements. Payback on these improvements is highly dependent on fuel prices.

=== Calculations of MPG overestimated ===
The United States Environmental Protection Agency (EPA) laboratory measurements of MPG had consistently overestimated fuel economy of gasoline vehicles and underestimated diesel vehicles. John DeCicco, the automotive expert for the Environmental Defense Fund (EDF), estimated that this results in about 20% higher actual consumption than measured CAFE goals. Starting with 2008-model vehicles, the EPA has adopted a new protocol for estimating the MPG figures presented to consumers. The new protocol includes driving cycles more closely representative of today's traffic and road conditions, as well as increased air conditioner usage. This change does not affect how the EPA calculates CAFE ratings; the new protocol changes only the mileage estimates provided for consumer information.

=== Low penalty ===
Some critics argue that CAFE fines do not seem to be having much impact in the fuel economy drive. As noted in the 2007 United States Government Accountability Office Report to the chairman of the U.S. Senate Committee on Commerce, Science, and Transportation (page 23) "Several experts stated that this is (penalties) not enough of a monetary incentive for manufacturers to comply with CAFE." For example, in 25 years, from 1983 to 2008, Mercedes-Benz paid penalties 21 times and BMW paid penalties 20 times.

From the 1997 through the 2018 model year, the CAFE penalty was US$55 per vehicle for every 1 MPG under the standard. For the year 2006 Mercedes-Benz drew a $30.3 million penalty for violating fuel economy standards by 2.2 MPG, or $122 per vehicle. According to the "fueleconomy.gov" website operated by the EPA, violating CAFE by 2.42 MPG means consuming an extra 27 barrels (4.3 m^{3}) (1,134 US gallons (4,290 L)) of mostly imported fuel in 10 years which is worth $3,490 (based on 45% highway, 55% city driving for 15,000 mi (24,140 km) annually, at a fuel price of $2.95 per gallon), which is 13.4% more than the target and also it means emitting an extra 14 Tons of CO_{2} in 10 years, which is 12.7% more. These numbers are based on comparison of 2010 Mercedes ML 350 4MATIC with CAFE Unadjusted Average Fuel Economy of 21.64 MPG (which met 2006 CAFE requirements of 21.6 MPG) and 2010 Mercedes ML 550 4MATIC with CAFE Unadjusted Average Fuel Economy of 19.22 MPG. So spending an extra $3,490 on mostly imported fuel and emitting an extra 14 tons of CO_{2} draws a penalty of only $122 for a single luxury car buyer, which is only 0.3% of the price of a $40,000 car (the average 2010 price of a luxury car). Several experts stated that this is not enough of a monetary incentive to comply with CAFE.

The CAFE penalty had increased only 10% since 1983, the year it was first implemented, while cumulative inflation has exceeded 150%. Thus, the CAFE penalty in 2019 is actually less than 40% of what it was in 1983. NHTSA officials stated that in addition to the authority the Federal Civil Penalties Inflation Adjustment Act of 1990 under the EPCA, the NHTSA has the authority to raise CAFE penalties to $100 per mpg shortfall. However, the NHTSA currently does not exercise this authority. In fact, in 2015 Congress required federal agencies to adjust civil penalties for inflation (Public Law 114–74) and NHTSA under Heidi King unlawfully delayed its implementation.

In 2022 NHTSA reinstated the inflation adjustment that was made in 2016 and began making annual inflation adjustments as required by law. For the 2019 through 2021 model years the rate is $14 per 0.1 MPG and increased to $15 per 0.1 MPG for the 2022 model year. Stellantis was the first manufacturer fined under a new rate.

== See also ==
- Battery electric vehicle
- California Air Resources Board
- Carbon tax
- Emission standard
- Energy Independence and Security Act
- European emission standards
- Fuel efficiency
- Fuel taxes in the United States
- Hybrid electric vehicle
- Miles per gallon gasoline equivalent
- Range-extended vehicle
- Regulatory failure
- Road-traffic safety
