= Heidi King =

American government official (born 1964)

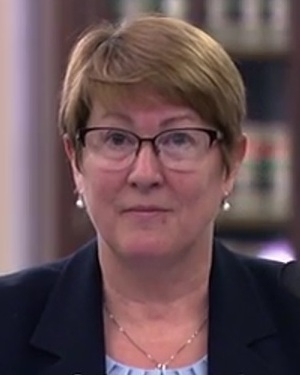
- Heidi King in 2018

Acting Administrator of the National Highway Traffic Safety Administration
- In office September 2017 – August 31, 2019
- President: Donald Trump

Personal details
- Born: December 21, 1964 (age 61) Ventura, California
- Education: California Institute of Technology; University of California, Irvine

Heidi R. King (born December 21, 1964) served as acting Administrator of the National Highway Traffic Safety Administration.

== Biography ==
King was born December 21, 1964, in Ventura, California. After serving as a park ranger for the California Department of Parks and Recreation, she received a B.A. from University of California, Irvine in 1995 and a M.Sc in economics from California Institute of Technology in 1998.

She served as a regulatory policy analyst in the Office of Management and Budget from 1998 to 2000. She then worked for Telcordia Technologies, and in 2002 moved to Pfizer. In 2007, she returned to government service in the Office of Management and Budget, and then in 2011 as chief economist of the House Energy and Commerce Committee. In 2013, she returned to the private sector as GE Capital's global director for environmental safety and risk.

In 2017, she returned once more to government service as Deputy Administrator of the National Highway Traffic Safety Administration. She was, in effect, the head of the agency, since the previous administrator, Mark Rosekind, left just before Trump's inauguration in January 2017. The White House announced April 5, 2018, that Donald Trump intends to nominate Heidi King to lead the National Highway Traffic Safety Administration.

Under the leadership of Deputy Administrator King, NHTSA published an updated vision for the nation's emergency medical services, launched programs to reduce traffic crashes caused by drug impaired driving, and pressed for faster replacement of defective Takata airbags.

Supporters for King's nomination included the National Safety Council for her commitment to highway safety and Securing America's Energy Future for her leadership in changing technology. The nomination was opposed by the Center for Auto Safety over the potential of risks of self driving cars and the Natural Resources Defense Council due to delays caused by economic analysis of fuel economy standards. In Senate hearings, King explained that delays were necessary to fully analyze safety consequences and engage consumers and other stakeholders in decision-making.

The nomination was approved by the Senate Commerce Committee by a 14–13 vote on June 17, 2018. After failing to receive consideration by the full Senate, her nomination was returned to President Trump at the close of the 115th Congress. The nomination was submitted to the 116th Congress on January 16, 2019, and after King resigned from the Agency it was withdrawn.
