= Goodyear Polyglas tire =

Automobile tire used on 1960s muscle cars

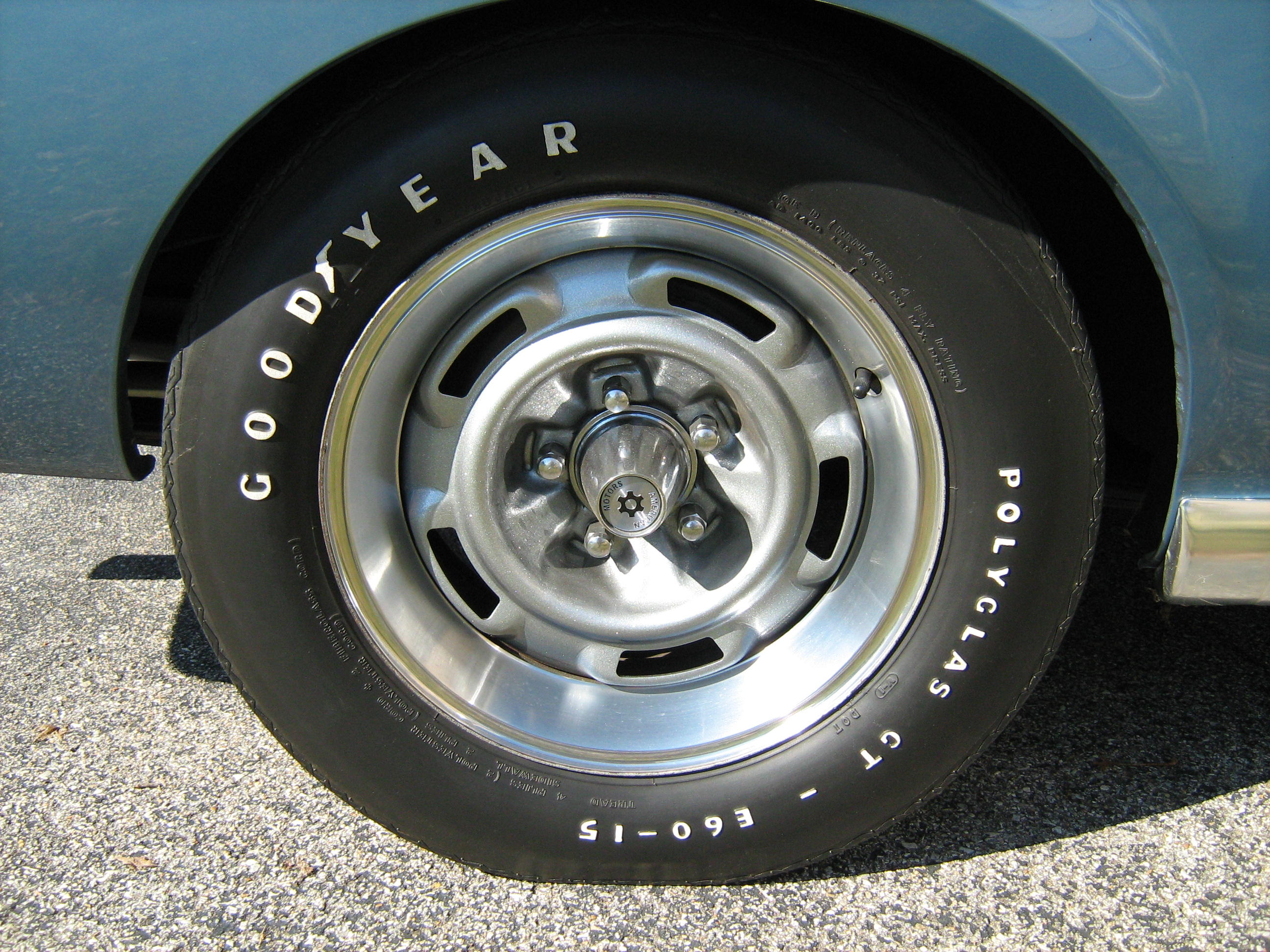
Goodyear Polyglas GT tires were standard equipment on 1970 AMC AMXs

The Goodyear Polyglas tire was a bias-belted tire announced in 1967 by Goodyear. "Polyglas" was a registered trademark. The tire combined some characteristics of both bias-ply and radial-ply tires. They had a wider tread than most other tires on the market then and used fiberglass belts.

== Design ==
Conventional tires up to that time featured a bias or cross-ply construction with body cords extending diagonally from bead to bead. The Polyglas tires had a bias construction that added stabilizing circumference belts directly beneath the tread. These fiberglass belts surrounded the polyester cord body, thus the Polyglas name for which Goodyear registered a U.S. trademark #859,703. The construction was a type "domestic performance car fans were familiar with".

Goodyear promoted the fiberglass belt design as having less tread "squirm" as the tire rolls on the road surface and improved traction for acceleration and braking. The polyester sidewalls provided stability for heavy cars at low inflation pressures. The features increased the mileage and enhanced road-holding performance. The objective was to gain the radial tire's longer tread life and a firmer road grip in a bias-belted tire. The Polyglas tires featured a wide footprint.

== Application ==
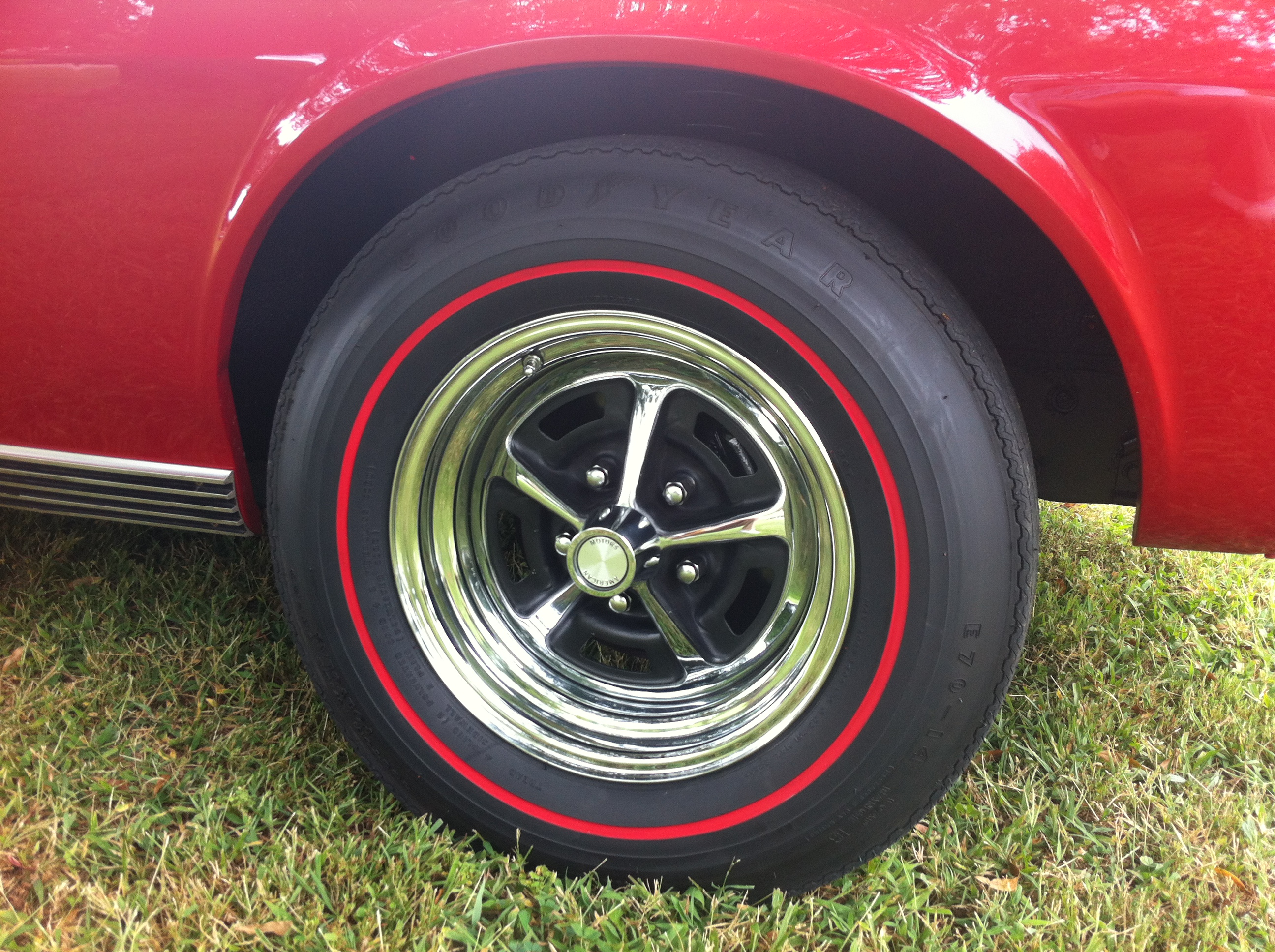
Goodyear Polyglas redline E70x14 tire

Goodyear Polyglas tires were available as standard equipment in the late 1960s and early 1970s muscle cars from General Motors, Ford, Chrysler, and American Motors. There were also comparable tires from competitors such as the Firestone Sup-R-Belt Wide Oval and Atlas Plycron 2plus2. Goodyear and comparable bias-belted tires began appearing as standard or optional equipment on most 1969-model passenger cars and nearly all 1970 through 1974 models.

The most common version of the Polyglas on muscle cars of that era had raised white lettering. These were among the first commercially available raised white-lettered tires. Some high-performance cars also featured tires with narrow "redline" sidewalls as standard equipment. Other versions of the Polyglas lineup were offered as blackwall, whitewall, and snow treaded tires. For driving in winter, Polyglass Pathfinder line of tires were available in unique versions for the steering front and rear driving axles along with optional "Safety Spikes" (studs).

== Advertising ==
The tires were marketed for their longer life as well as in situations where better tires are needed to compensate for the driver and challenging conditions. Television advertisements in 1970 showed that women need Polyglas tires to compensate for their lack of driving ability.

== Successors ==
Automakers and consumers in the United States continued with low-cost bias-ply type tires through the early 1970s. The Polyglas tire and its combination competitors were replaced by steel belted radials as original equipment tires after 1975. Increased fuel efficiency and tire mileage overcame the higher price of radial construction. According to a 1976 study, more police departments used steel or fabric radial-ply tires than belted bias-ply and bias or cross-ply tires for their pursuit cars.

Goodyear Polyglas tires are now manufactured for owners of period cars.
