= Steven Cliff =

American transportation official

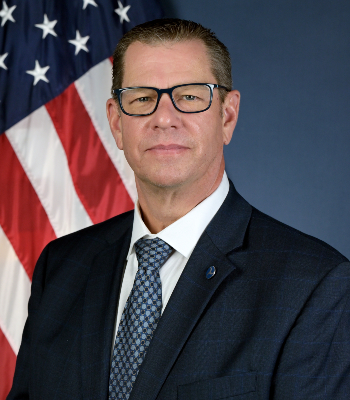
- Cliff in 2015

16th Administrator of the National Highway Traffic Safety Administration
- In office June 9, 2022 – September 12, 2022
- President: Joe Biden
- Preceded by: James C. Owens (acting)
- Succeeded by: Jonathan Morrison (2025)

Personal details
- Education: University of California, San Diego (BS, PhD)

Steven Scott Cliff is an American atmospheric chemist and is the current Executive Officer for the California Air Resources Board since September 2022.

Cliff previously served as the 16th administrator of the National Highway Traffic Safety Administration. He also served as deputy executive officer of the California Air Resources Board and assistant director of sustainability in the California Department of Transportation.

== Education ==
Cliff earned a Bachelor of Science and PhD in chemistry from the University of California, San Diego. He completed post-doctoral studies at the University of California, Davis Department of Land, Air and Water Resources.

== Career ==
After earning his PhD, Cliff worked as a research professor at the University of California, Davis. He then joined the California Air Resources Board, working as a technical manager for greenhouse gas cap-and-trade policy. He later served as chief of the GHG Market Development and Oversight Branch and assistant division chief of the Climate Program. From 2014 to 2016, he served as assistant director of sustainability in the California Department of Transportation. He later rejoined the California Air Resources Board, serving as a senior advisor to the chair and deputy executive officer. In February 2021, Cliff became a senior advisor at the National Highway Traffic Safety Administration.

=== Nomination to NHTSA ===
Cliff was nominated to serve as administrator of the NHTSA on October 19, 2021. On December 16, 2021, the Senate's Commerce Committee held hearings on his nomination. Cliff's nomination ultimately expired at the end of the year and was returned on January 3, 2022. President Biden resent his nomination to the Senate the following day. On February 2, 2022, the committee favorably reported Cliff's nomination to the Senate floor. On May 26, 2022, the United States Senate confirmed his nomination by a voice vote. He resigned a few months later to return to his former employer back in California to head his former department.
