= Alliance of Automobile Manufacturers =

Defunct trade group of automobile manufacturers

Auto Alliance
- Type: Trade Group
- Headquarters: Washington, D.C., United States
- Number of locations: Sacramento, California; Detroit, Michigan
- Members: BMW; Fiat Chrysler Automobiles; Ford Motor Company; General Motors Company; Jaguar Land Rover; Mazda; Mercedes-Benz USA; Mitsubishi Motors; Porsche; Toyota; Volkswagen Group of America; Volvo Car USA

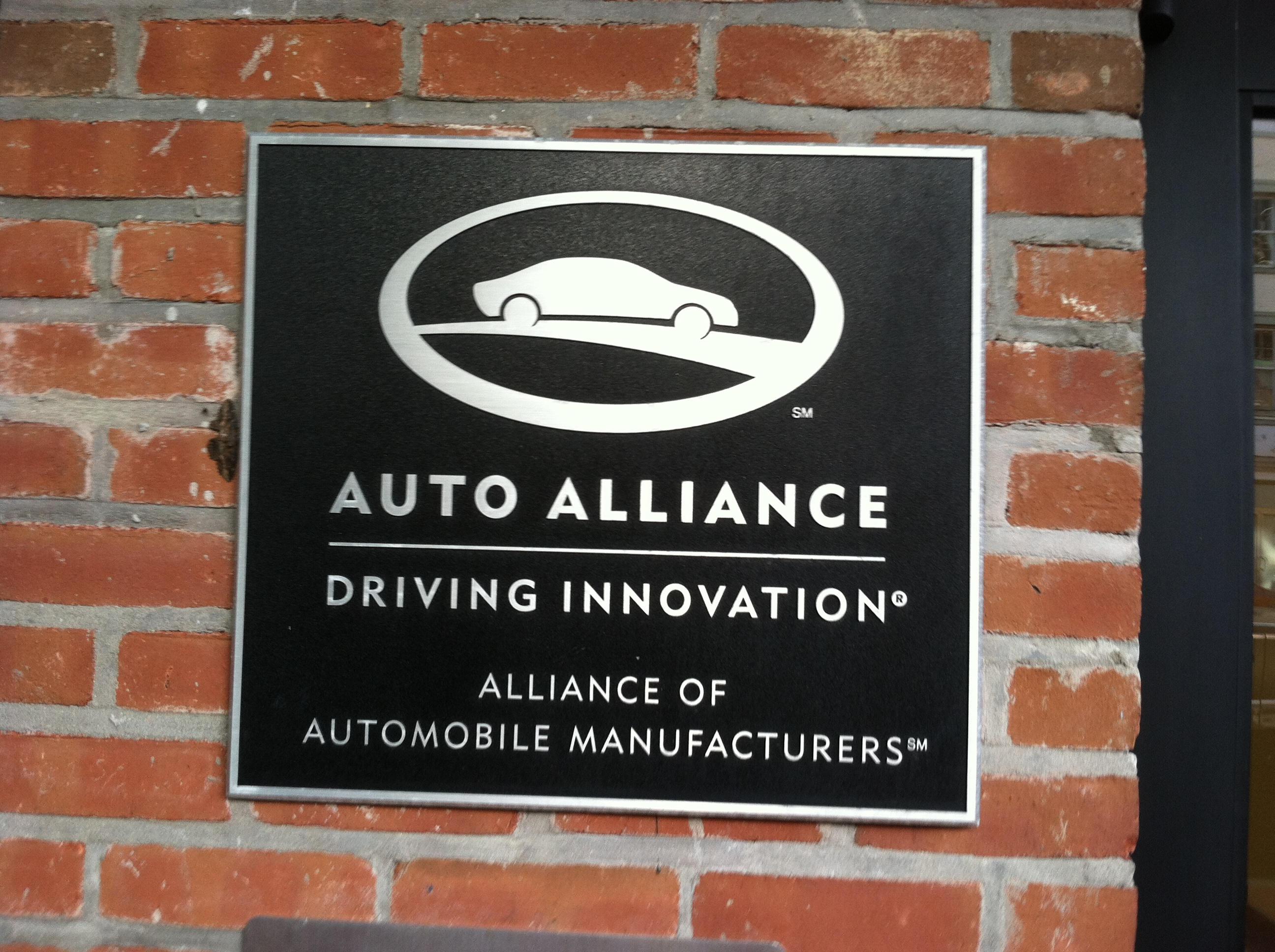
In Washington, D.C., the Alliance of Automobile Manufacturers plaque on their HQ

The Auto Alliance (AAM) is a defunct trade group of automobile manufacturers that operated in the United States. It was the leading advocacy group for the auto industry, representing 77% of all car and light truck sales in the United States. The Auto Alliance was active in the areas of environment, energy and motor vehicle safety. In 2019, the Alliance was merged with the Association of Global Automakers to form the Alliance for Automotive Innovation. John Bozzella of Global Automakers became the new CEO.

== History ==
The trade group formed on January 13, 1999, to replace the American Automobile Manufacturers Association, which had represented only American manufacturers. The members of the Auto Alliance were:

- BMW Group
- Fiat Chrysler Automobiles
- Ford
- General Motors
- Honda
- Hyundai
- Jaguar Land Rover
- Mazda
- Mercedes-Benz USA
- Mitsubishi Motors
- Nissan
- Porsche
- Toyota
- Volkswagen Group of America
- Volvo Car USA

As an advocacy group for the automobile industry on public policy issues, an example of the alliance's activity includes sponsorship of the Transportation Data Center at the University of Michigan Transportation Research Institute (UMTRI).

Likewise, the alliance was active in political lobbying on behalf of the industry. The alliance appealed, for instance, a district-court ruling in California in September 2007 that upheld states' ability to regulate exhaust emissions, the issue having a strong bearing on state and federal vehicle mileage regulations. They also have weighed in on the federal government's new fuel economy and emissions standards proposals calling for other industries to do their part in helping to trim pollution and conserve energy. The Alliance opposes the Motor Vehicle Owners' Right to Repair Act.

In September 2009, the Alliance of Automobile Manufacturers joined the Obama administration and environmentalists in opposing an effort to bar the U.S. Environmental Protection Agency for one year from attempting to regulate green-house-gas emissions for power plants and other large sources, preferring a single nationwide set of rules, a main priority since 2002.

AAM suggested to the coming Trump government in November 2016 that the Corporate Average Fuel Economy (CAFE) fuel economy rules be reviewed and relaxed.

== See also ==
- Automotive industry
- American Automotive Policy Council
- Association of Global Automakers
- 2008–2010 automotive industry crisis
