= Chinese people in the New York metropolitan area =

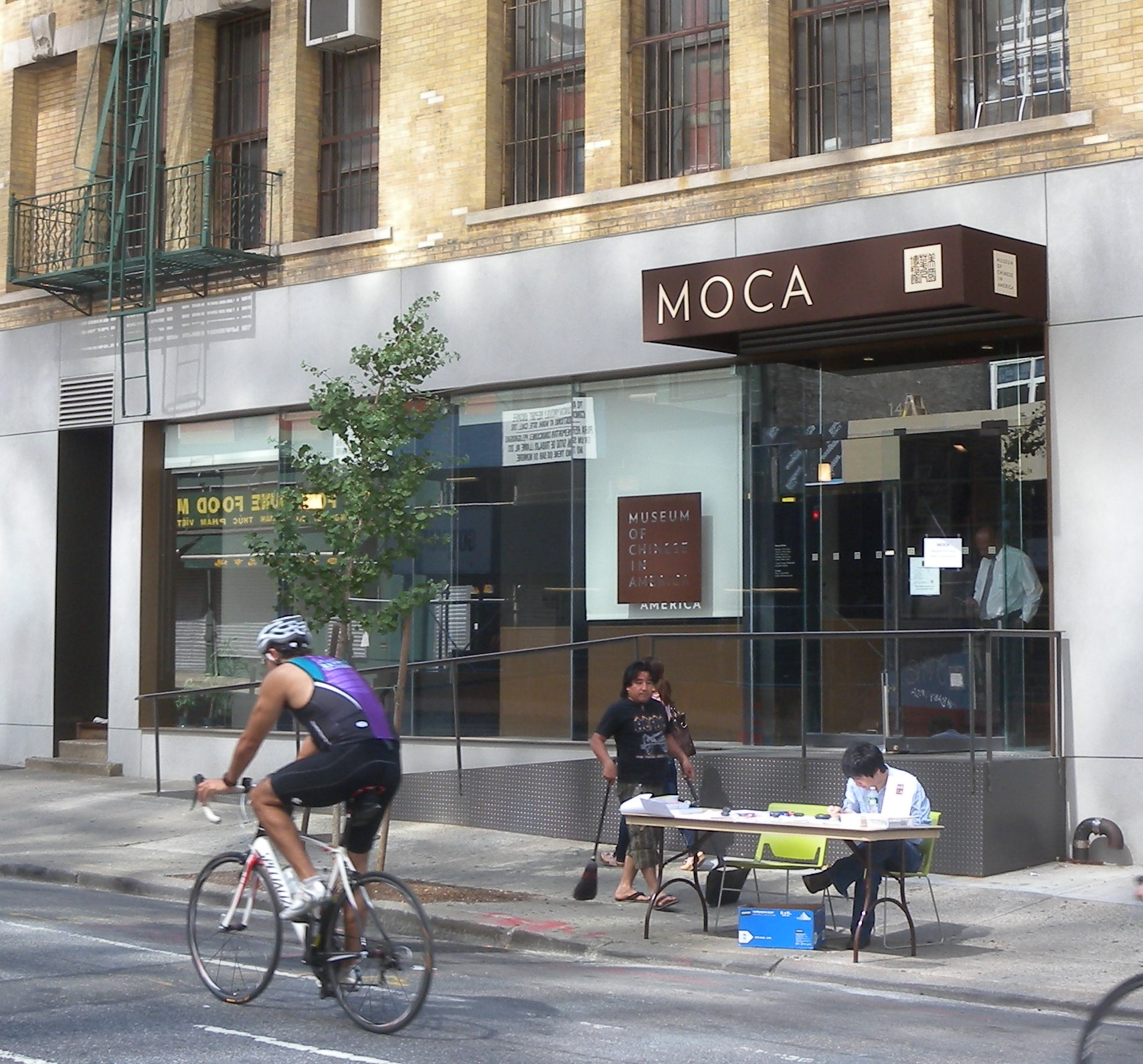
The Chinese American experience has been documented at the Museum of Chinese in America in Manhattan's Chinatown since 1980.

The New York metropolitan area is home by a significant margin to the highest uniracial ethnic Chinese population outside Asia: an estimated 1 million as of 2025. New York City proper is also home to the highest uniracial Chinese population by far of any city proper outside Asia: an estimated 700,000 as of 2025.

Many ethnically Chinese people live in 12 Chinatowns—districts with large ethnic Chinese populations and numerous culturally Chinese businesses—in the metropolitan area, which includes Long Island and parts of New Jersey. Many American Chinatowns originated as enclaves of physical safety and economic opportunity during the "exclusion era" (1882–1943) when the Chinese Exclusion Act placed racial limits on immigration and prevented Chinese immigrants from becoming US citizens. Today, these neighborhoods are important sites of tourism and urban economic activity. The city proper includes six Chinatowns (or nine, if the emerging Chinatowns in Elmhurst and Whitestone, Queens, and East Harlem, Manhattan, are included). There are also Chinese communities in suburban areas, such as Jersey City, New Jersey; Nassau County, Long Island; Edison, New Jersey; West Windsor, New Jersey; and Parsippany-Troy Hills, New Jersey.

China City of America in Sullivan County, New York, was proposed in 2012, but its development has stalled. Dragon Springs (in Deerpark, Orange County, New York) serves as the de facto headquarters for the global Falun Gong movement and its performing arts troupe, Shen Yun.

The Chinese American community has grown in recent decades, particularly in major metropolitan areas. Immigration from mainland China has contributed to the growth in the New York metropolitan area. In 2023, unauthorized Chinese immigration to New York City rose, particularly in Queens.

In 2026, Gothamist and AsAmNews reported that the city's Chinese immigrant population had grown to rival the Dominican immigrant population as the city's largest.

== History ==
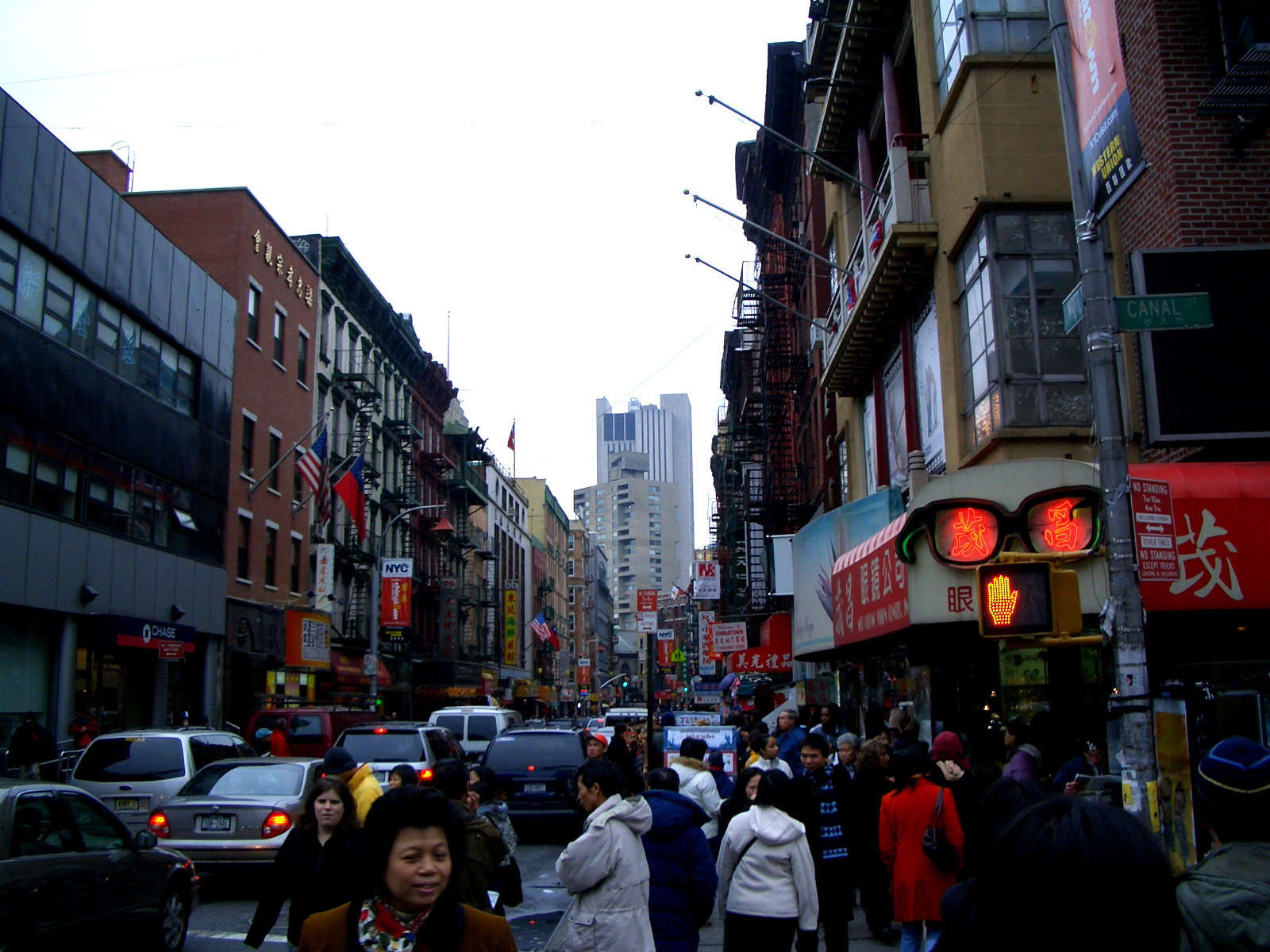
Crossing Canal Street in the Manhattan Chinatown, facing Mott Street toward the south

In the 1830s, among the earliest documented arrivals of Chinese immigrants in New York City were "sailors and peddlers". In 1847, three students came to further their education in the United States. One of these scholars, Yung Wing, soon became the first Chinese American to graduate from a U.S. college, when he completed his studies at Yale University in 1854.

Throughout the nineteenth century, the number of Chinese immigrants settling in Lower Manhattan grew. By 1880, the enclave around Five Points was estimated to have from 200 to as many as 1,100 members. However, the Chinese Exclusion Act, which went into effect in 1882, caused an abrupt decline in the number of Chinese immigrants to New York and the rest of the United States. Later, on December 17th, 1943, the Magnuson Act was passed and repealed the Chinese exclusion act, and a small immigration quota of around 105 visas annually was established for Chinese people. The Immigration and Nationality Act of 1965 contributed to a revival in Chinese immigration, and the community's population gradually increased until 1968. In that year, the quota was lifted and the Chinese American population grew rapidly.

In 1992, New York City began providing electoral materials in Chinese. The Sino-American Friendship Association was established in Midtown Manhattan in 1992. In 2022, "police service stations" serving as espionage arms of the Chinese Communist Party were discovered and shut down in Manhattan's Chinatown and Flushing's Chinatown.

== Demographics ==
=== New York City boroughs ===
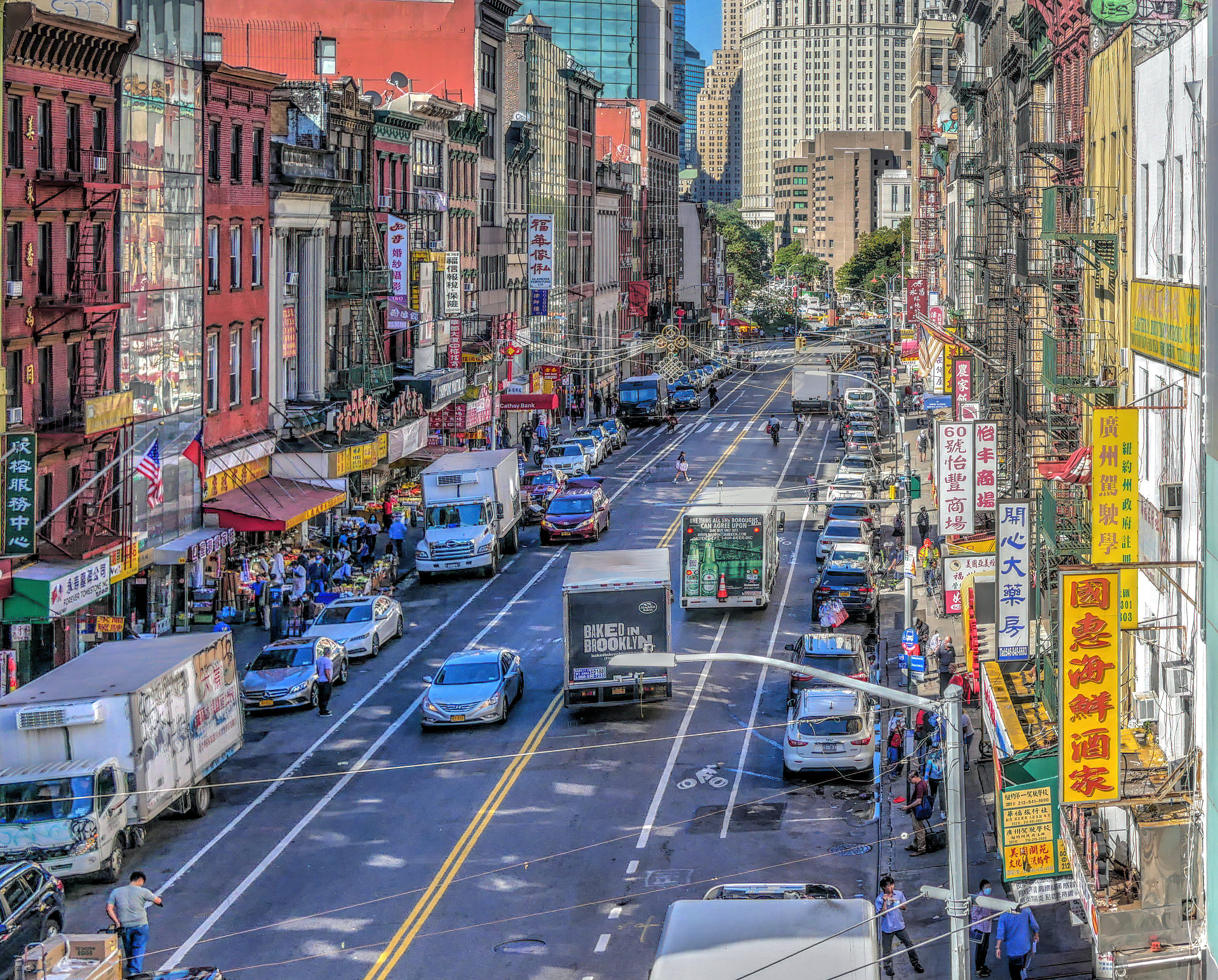
Little Fuzhou is a sub-neighborhood within Chinatown, Manhattan, the highest concentration of Chinese people outside of Asia.

New York City has the largest Chinese population of any city outside of Asia, with an estimated population of 700,000 in 2025. The city continues to be the primary destination for new Chinese immigrants. New York City is subdivided into official municipal boroughs, which themselves are home to significant Chinese populations, with Brooklyn and Queens, adjacently located on Long Island, leading the fastest growth. After the City of New York itself, the boroughs of Queens and Brooklyn encompass the largest Chinese populations, respectively, of all municipalities in the United States.

Chinese Americans in New York City
borough	Chinese Americans residents	
borough	percent	number
Queens	10.2	265,135
Brooklyn	7.9	222,059
Manhattan	6.6	119,208
Staten Island	2.9	27,707
The Bronx	0.5	7,859
New York City		573,388

=== Immigration from China during the 2010s ===
The city's Chinese-immigrant population saw significant growth since the beginning of the 21st century, rising from 261,500 in New York City in 2000 to 350,000 in 2011. Chinese nationals filed 12,000 asylum requests in fiscal year 2013 in fiscal year 2013, of which 4,000 were filed with the New York-area asylum office. In 2013, 19,645 Chinese immigrants legally immigrated from Mainland China to the New York-Northern New Jersey-Long Island, NY-NJ-PA core-based statistical area. This exceeded the combined totals for the Los Angeles and San Francisco metropolitan areas, the next two largest Chinese American gateways. The corresponding figures for earlier years were 24,763 in 2012, 28,390 in 2011, and 19,811 in 2010. These numbers do not include the remainder of the New York-Newark-Bridgeport, NY-NJ-CT-PA Combined Statistical Area, nor do they include the smaller numbers of legal immigrants from Taiwan and Hong Kong. Since the 1980s, NYC has seen a rise in undocumented Chinese immigration, including Fuzhou people from Fujian and Wenzhounese from Zhejiang in mainland China.

The city's 150,000 to 200,000 Fuzhounese Americans account for the bulk of the group in the United States, many of whom are employed in or operate businesses within the Chinese restaurant industry.

Many airlines connect Asia to New York metropolitan area. As of April 2026, John F. Kennedy International Airport (JFK) is a primary hub for several mainland Chinese carriers, including Air China (Beijing), China Eastern Airlines (Shanghai), China Southern Airlines (Guangzhou), and XiamenAir (Xiamen). They are joined at JFK by major regional players like Cathay Pacific Airways, and Philippine Airlines. The Taiwan-New York route is particularly well-served at JFK by China Airlines (non-stop to Taipei) and EVA Air.

Newark Liberty International Airport (EWR) remains a critical gateway, primarily through United Airlines, which operates an extensive non-stop network to Beijing, Shanghai and Hong Kong currently suspended following the Russo-Ukrainian war and COVID-19 pandemic continues to operate Tokyo and Delhi. Singapore Airlines continues to operate its world-renowned ultra-long-haul service to Singapore from both Newark and JFK (with Newark flight maintaining its status as one of the longest nonstop commercial routes in existence)

=== Movement within and outside the metropolitan area ===
As many immigrant Chinese in New York City move up the socioeconomic ladder, they relocate to the suburbs for more living space and to seek specific school districts for their children. As a result of this process, new Chinese enclaves and Chinatown commercial districts have emerged and are growing in these suburbs, particularly in Nassau County on Long Island and in some counties of New Jersey. Some Chinese New Yorkers are also migrating to Boston, Philadelphia, and eastern Connecticut.

== Geography ==
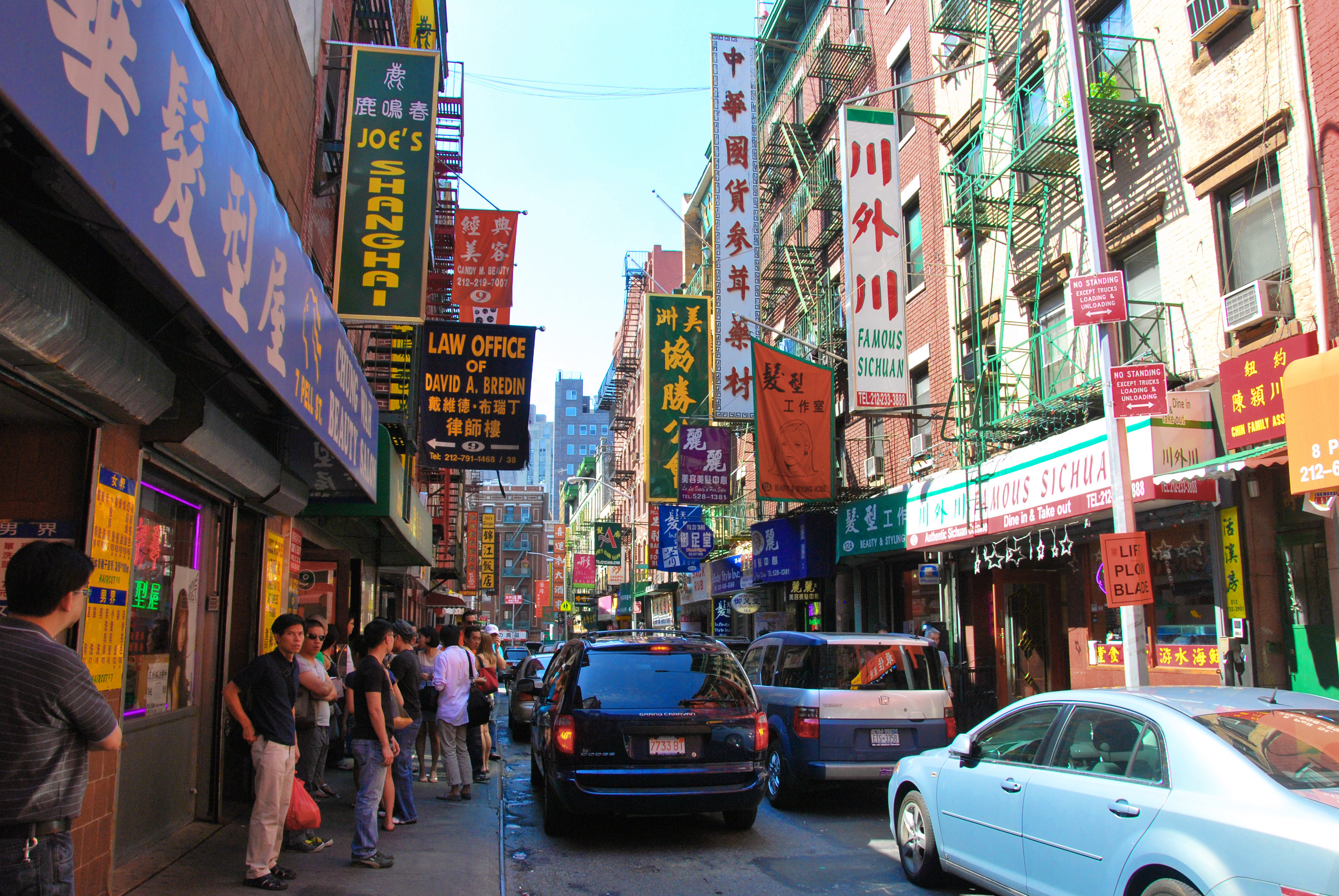
Pell Street, Manhattan Chinatown

Little Fuzhou in Manhattan is an ethnoculturally distinct neighborhood within the Manhattan Chinatown itself, populated primarily by Fujianese people. The Sunset Park neighborhood of Brooklyn houses another such Little Fuzhou. Queens and Brooklyn are home to other Chinatowns. The Flushing as well as Elmhurst areas of Queens, Bensonhurst and Homecrest, neighborhoods in Brooklyn also have spawned the development of numerous other Chinatowns. Most of Manhattan, as well as Corona in Queens, the Brooklyn Heights and Park Slope areas of Brooklyn, and northeast Staten Island, have also received Chinese settlement.

=== Chinatowns ===
For many decades in the 20th century, Manhattan's Chinatown was the only Chinatown of NYC until the 1980s when other satellite Chinatowns began to emerge out in Queens and Brooklyn and since the 1990s and especially the 2000s onward, each of these boroughs has evolved multiple large Chinatowns in various sections and far surpassing Manhattan's Chinatown as the largest Chinese population base of NYC. Since the 2010s, Staten Island has also experienced a boom in Chinese residents and authentic Chinese businesses where now New Dorp is being considered the growing Chinatown of Staten Island, which means almost every borough of NYC now has large growing Chinese enclaves leaving The Bronx as the only borough in the city to lack a significant growing Chinese enclave.

==== Manhattan (曼哈頓華埠) ====
Manhattan's Chinatown holds the highest concentration of Chinese people in the Western Hemisphere. Manhattan's Chinatown is also one of the oldest Chinese ethnic enclaves. The Manhattan Chinatown is one of nine Chinatown neighborhoods in New York City, as well as one of twelve in the New York metropolitan area, which contains the largest ethnic Chinese population outside of Asia, comprising an estimated 893,697 monoracial individuals as of 2017. Manhattan's Chinatown is divided into two different portions. The western portion is the older, original part of Manhattan's Chinatown, primarily dominated by Cantonese populations and colloquially known as Cantonese Chinatown. Cantonese were the earlier settlers of Manhattan's Chinatown, originating mostly from Hong Kong and from Taishan in Guangdong Province, as well as from Shanghai. They form most of the Chinese population of the area surrounded by Mott and Canal Streets.

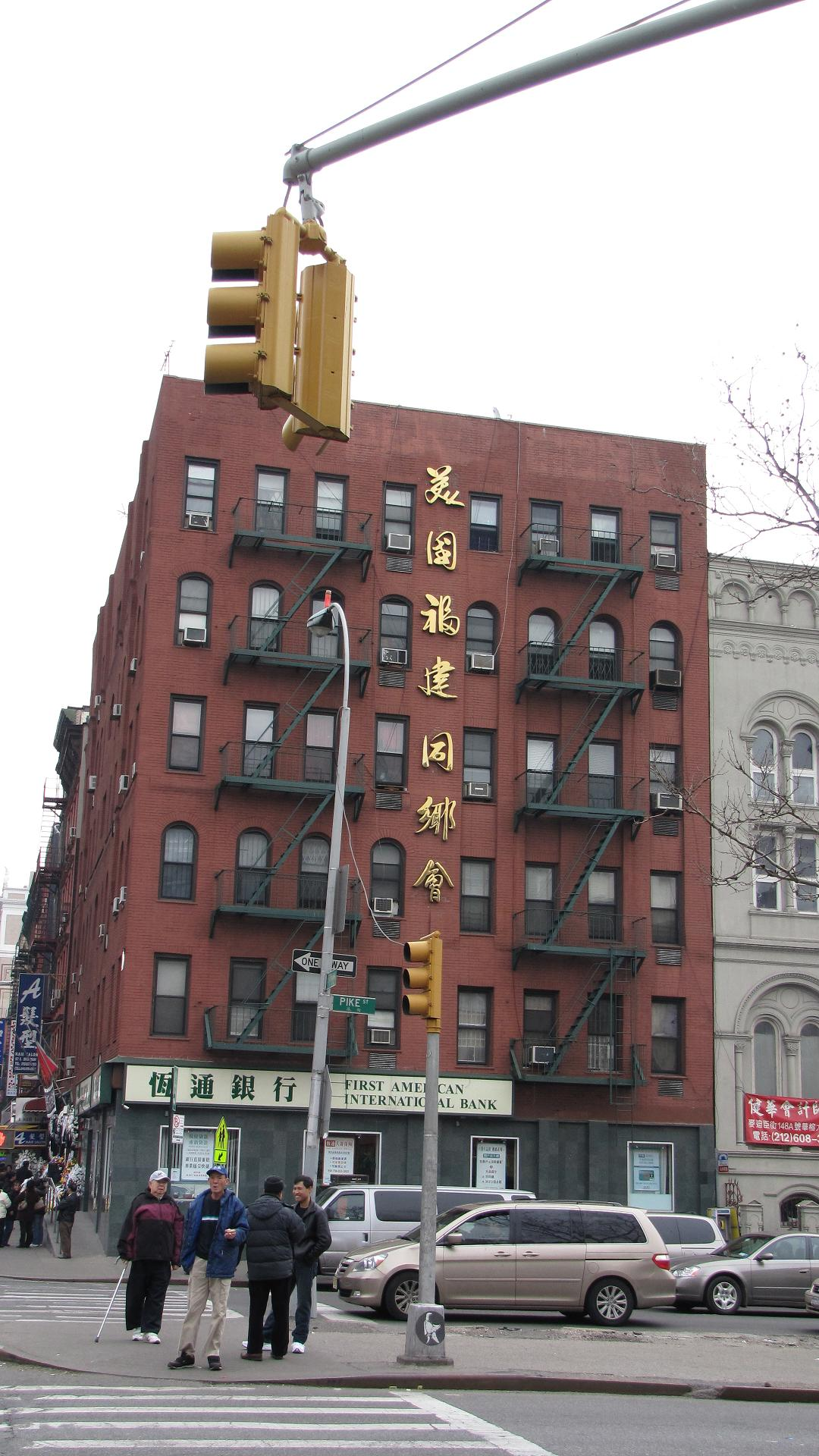
The Fukien American Association is based in Chinatown's Little Fuzhou (小福州, 紐約華埠) neighborhood.

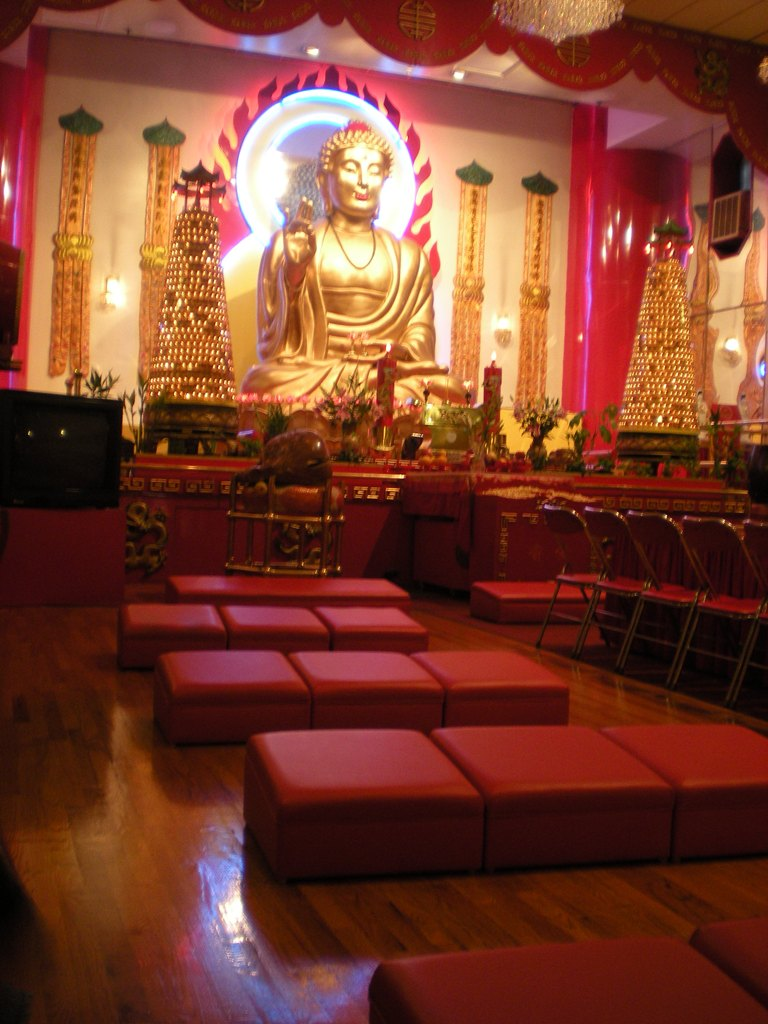
Mahayana Buddhist Temple (大乘佛教寺廟) of North America on Canal Street in Chinatown, Manhattan

However, within Manhattan's Chinatown lies Little Fuzhou or The Fuzhou Chinatown on East Broadway and surrounding streets, occupied predominantly by emigrants from the province of Fujian in mainland China. They are the later settlers, from Fuzhou, Fujian, forming the majority of the Chinese population in the vicinity of East Broadway. This eastern portion of Manhattan's Chinatown developed much later, primarily after the Fuzhou immigrants began moving in.

Areas surrounding "Little Fuzhou" consist of Cantonese immigrants from the Guangdong of China; however, the main concentration of people speaking the Cantonese language is in the older western portion of Manhattan's Chinatown. Although the Mandarin-speaking communities were becoming established in the Flushing and Elmhurst areas of Queens during the 1980s–1990s, and even though the Fuzhou emigrants spoke Mandarin often as well, however, due to their socioeconomic status, they could not afford the housing prices in Mandarin-speaking enclaves in Queens, which were more middle class, and the job opportunities were limited. They instead chose to settle in Manhattan's Chinatown for affordable housing as well as the job opportunities that were available, such as the seamstress factories and restaurants, despite the traditional Cantonese dominance until the 1990s. Brooklyn's Sunset Park Chinatown eventually replicated this pattern, albeit on a larger scale.

The Cantonese dialect that has dominated Chinatown for decades is being rapidly swept aside by Mandarin, the national language of China, which is becoming the lingua franca. This can be attributed to the influx of immigrants from Fuzhou who often speak Mandarin, as well as the increase in Mandarin-speaking visitors coming to visit the neighborhood.

The modern borders of Manhattan's Chinatown are roughly Delancey Street on the north, Chambers Street on the south, East Broadway on the east, and Broadway on the west.

==== Queens (皇后華埠) ====
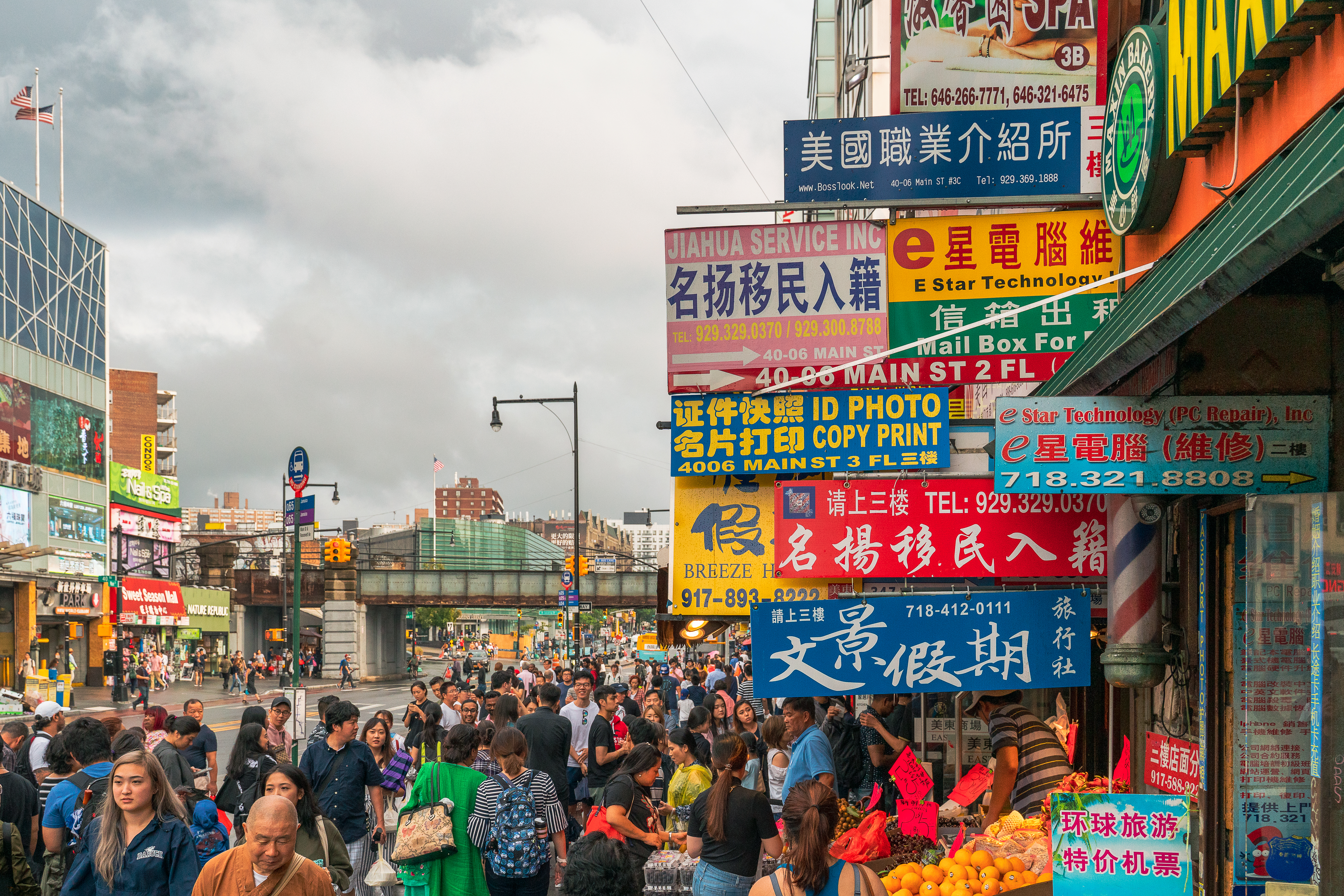
The intersection of Main Street, Kissena Boulevard, and 41st Ave. in the Flushing Chinatown (法拉盛華埠), Queens, NYC. The cultural heart of Flushing Chinatown is Main St. between Kissena Boulevard and Roosevelt Ave., punctuated by the Long Island Rail Road trestle overpass. With more than 30,000 residents born in China alone, the largest by this metric outside Asia, Flushing is home to largest and fastest-growing Chinatown in the world. Flushing is undergoing rapid gentrification by Chinese transnational entities.

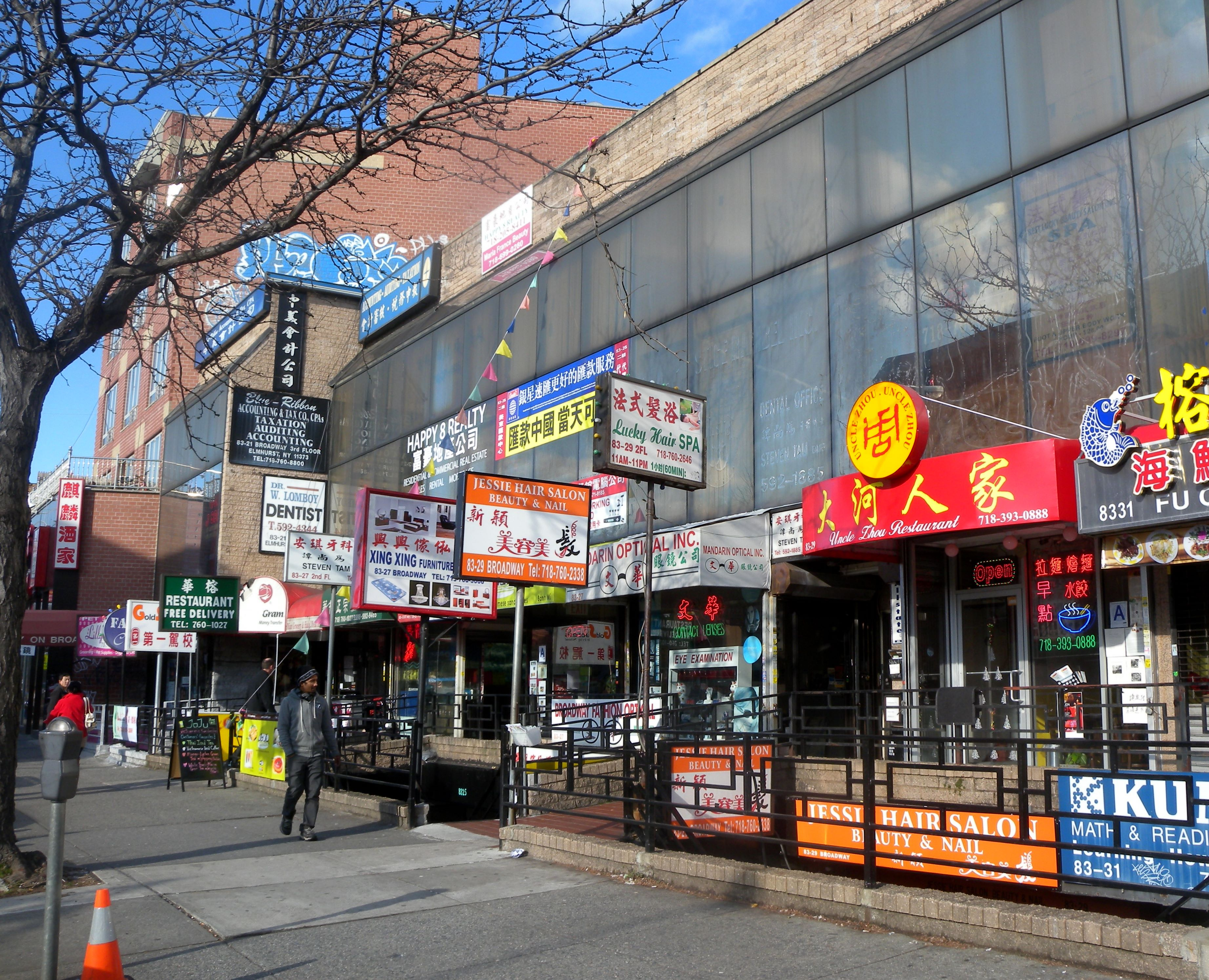
The Elmhurst Chinatown (艾姆赫斯特) on Broadway in Queens is now a satellite of the Flushing Chinatown.

New York City's satellite Chinatowns in Queens, as well as in Brooklyn, are thriving as traditionally urban enclaves, as large-scale Chinese immigration into New York continues, with the largest metropolitan Chinese population outside Asia, busy intersection of Main Street, Kissena Boulevard, and 41st Avenue in the Flushing Chinatown (法拉盛華埠), in Queens. The segment of Main Street between Kissena Boulevard and Roosevelt Avenue, punctuated by the Long Island Rail Road trestle overpass, represents the cultural heart of Flushing Chinatown. The neighborhood expands southeastward along Kissena Boulevard and northward beyond Northern Boulevard. Housing more than 30,000 individuals born in China alone, the largest by this metric outside Asia, Flushing is home to one of the largest and fastest-growing Chinatowns in the world. Massage parlors in the Flushing Chinatown have become the hub of organized prostitution in the United States.

In the 1970s, a Chinese community established a foothold in the neighborhood of Flushing, whose demographic constituency had been predominantly non-Hispanic white. Taiwanese began the surge of immigration. It originally started off as Little Taipei or Little Taiwan due to the large Taiwanese population. Due to the then-dominance of working-class Cantonese immigrants in Manhattan's Chinatown, including its poor housing conditions, they could not relate to them and settled in Flushing.

Later on, when other groups of Non-Cantonese Chinese, mostly speaking Mandarin, started arriving in NYC, like the Taiwanese, they could not relate to Manhattan's then-dominant Cantonese Chinatown; as a result, they mainly settled with Taiwanese to be around Mandarin speakers. Later, Flushing's Chinatown would become the main center of different Chinese regional groups and cultures in NYC. By 1990, Asians constituted 41% of the population of the core area of Flushing, with Chinese in turn representing 41% of the Asian population. However, ethnic Chinese now constitute an increasingly dominant proportion of the Asian population as well as of the overall population in Flushing and its Chinatown. A 1986 estimate by the Flushing Chinese Business Association approximated 60,000 Chinese in Flushing alone. Mandarin (including Northeastern Mandarin and Beijing dialect), Fuzhou dialect, Min Nan Fujianese (Hokkien), Wu Chinese (including Wenzhounese, Shanghainese, Suzhou dialect, Hangzhou dialect and Changzhou dialect), Cantonese, and English are all prevalently spoken in Flushing Chinatown, while the Mongolian language is now emerging. Even the relatively obscure Dongbei style of cuisine indigenous to Northeast China is now available there. Given its rapidly growing status, the Flushing Chinatown has surpassed the original New York City Chinatown in the Borough of Manhattan in size and population, while Queens and Brooklyn vie for the largest Chinese population of any municipality in the United States apart from New York City as a whole.

Elmhurst, another neighborhood in Queens, also has a large and growing Chinese community. Previously a small area with Chinese shops on Broadway between 81st Street and Cornish Avenue, this new Chinatown has now expanded to 45th Avenue and Whitney Avenue. Since 2000, thousands of Chinese Americans have migrated into Whitestone, Queens (白石), given the sizeable presence of the neighboring Flushing Chinatown, and have continued their expansion eastward in Queens and into neighboring, highly educated Nassau County (拿騷縣) on Long Island (長島), which has become the most popular suburban destination in the U.S. for Chinese.

Since the 2020s, there has also been a rapidly growing Chinese enclave in Long Island City, composed mainly of higher-income residents; this community was described in LIC Journal as "New York's newest Chinatown". The expanding Chinese enclave was part of a larger trend of growth in the community's Asian population, which was 34% Asian by 2021. Most of the new Asian residents in Long Island City are East Asian, specifically Chinese, Korean, or Japanese, and are second- or third-generation Americans. On the other side of Long Island City, the Queensbridge Houses public-housing development has also been receiving working class Asian residents, with many of them being Chinese.

==== Brooklyn (布魯克林華埠) ====
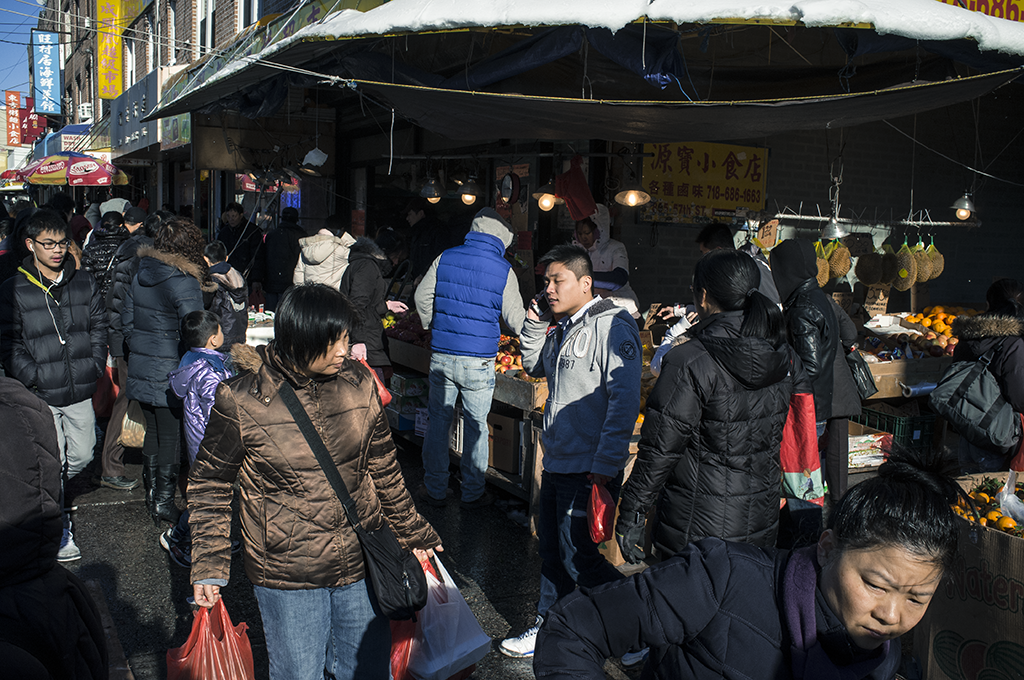
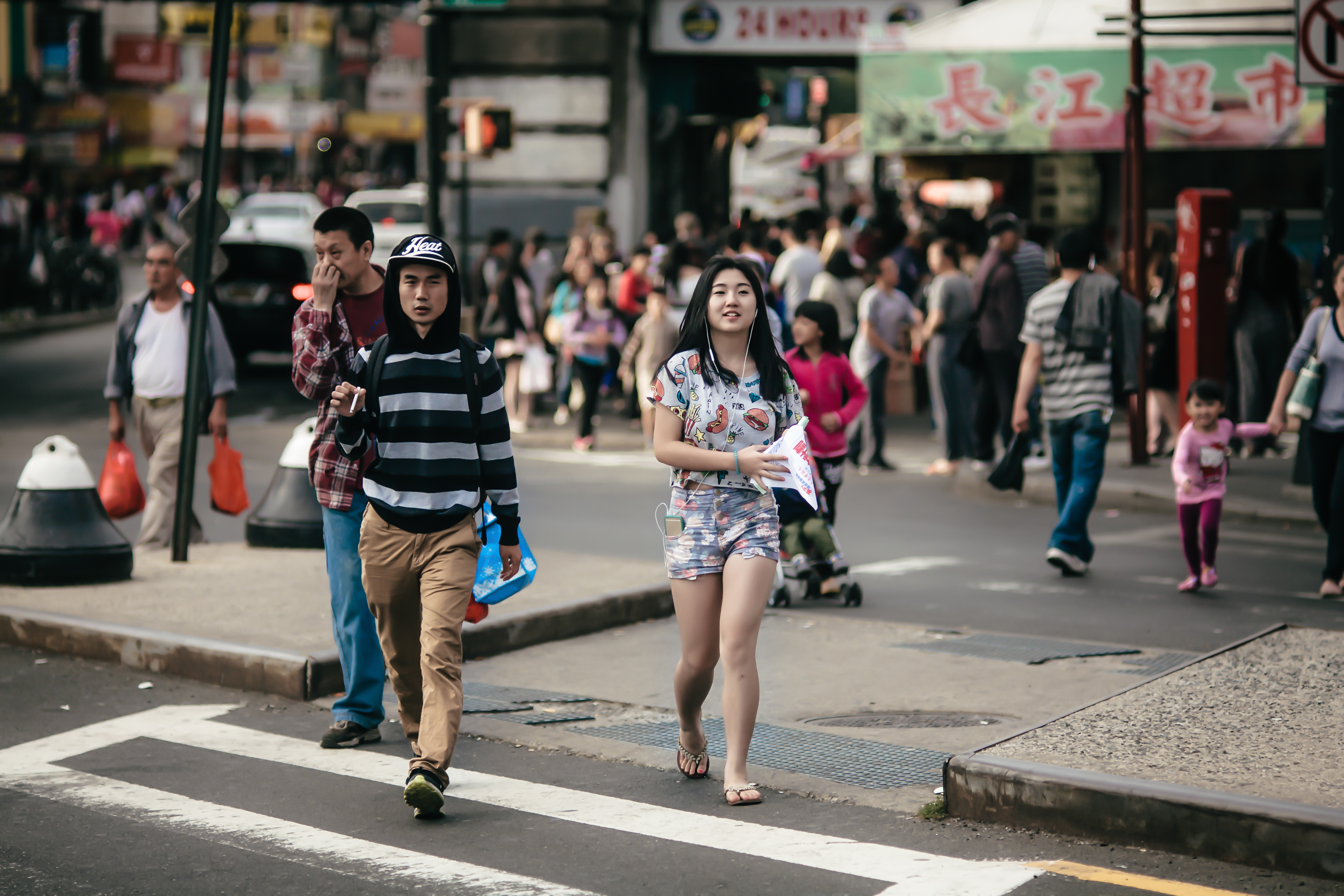
One of several Chinatowns in Brooklyn (布魯克林華埠) (above) and Chinatowns in Queens (在皇后區唐人街) (below). Chinese in New York constitute the fastest-growing nationality in New York State and on Long Island, with large-scale Chinese immigration continuing into New York, home to the largest metropolitan Chinese population outside of Asia.

By 1988, 90% of the storefronts on Eighth Avenue in Sunset Park, Brooklyn, were abandoned. Chinese immigrants then moved into this area, consisting of not only new arrivals from China but also members of Manhattan's Chinatown seeking refuge from high rents, who flocked to the relatively less expensive property costs and rents of Sunset Park and formed the original Brooklyn Chinatown, which now extends for 20 blocks along 8th Avenue, from 42nd to 62nd Streets. This relatively new but rapidly growing Chinatown located in Sunset Park was originally settled by Cantonese immigrants, like Manhattan's Chinatown in the past. However, in the recent decade, an influx of Fuzhou immigrants has been pouring into Brooklyn's Chinatown and supplanting the Cantonese at a higher rate than in Manhattan's Chinatown, and Brooklyn's Chinatown is now home to mostly Fuzhou immigrants.

During the 1980s and 1990s, the majority of newly arriving Fuzhou immigrants settled within Manhattan's Chinatown, and the first Little Fuzhou community emerged within Manhattan's Chinatown. However, by the first decade of the 21st century, the epicenter of the massive Fuzhou influx had shifted to Brooklyn's Chinatown, which is now home to the fastest-growing and perhaps largest Fuzhou population in New York City. Unlike the Little Fuzhou in Manhattan's Chinatown, which remains surrounded by areas that continue to house populations of Cantonese, all of Brooklyn's Chinatown is swiftly consolidating into New York City's new Little Fuzhou. However, a growing community of Wenzhounese immigrants from China's Zhejiang is now also arriving in Brooklyn's Chinatown. Also in contrast to Manhattan's Chinatown, which still successfully continues to carry a large Cantonese population and retain the large Cantonese community established decades ago in its western section, where Cantonese residents have a communal venue to shop, work, and socialize, Brooklyn's Chinatown has seen a change from its primarily Cantonese community identity to a more diverse Chinese population.

Like Manhattan's Chinatown during the 1980s and 1990s (pre-gentrification), Brooklyn's Chinatown became the main affordable housing center for Fuzhou immigrants – and for job opportunities ranging from seamstress factories and restaurants – despite its domination by Cantonese immigrants in the earlier years.

Bensonhurst, Brooklyn, as well as Avenue U in Homecrest, Brooklyn, in addition to Bay Ridge, Borough Park, Coney Island, Dyker Heights, Gravesend, and Marine Park, has given rise to the development of Brooklyn's newer satellite Chinatowns, as evidenced by the growing number of Chinese-run fruit markets, restaurants, beauty and nail salons, small offices, and computer and consumer electronics dealers. While the foreign-born Chinese population in New York City increased by 35 percent between 2000 and 2013, to 353,000 from about 262,000, the foreign-born Chinese population in Brooklyn increased 49 percent during the same period, to 128,000 from 86,000, according to The New York Times. The emergence of multiple Chinatowns in Brooklyn is due to overcrowding and high property values in Sunset Park's main Chinatown, leading many Cantonese immigrants to move out of Sunset Park into these new areas. As a result, the newer, smaller Brooklyn Chinatowns are primarily Cantonese-dominated, while the main Brooklyn Chinatown is increasingly dominated by Fuzhou emigres.

==== Staten Island (史丹頓島華埠) ====
Staten Island has been getting an influx of Chinese homeowners since the 2010s due to wanting a more relatively affordability to purchase homes with many of them originally coming from southern Brooklyn's Chinatowns, which have experienced property value and house purchase and rent price hikes. But since 2020s, their numbers have grown even more where now some reports indicating a Chinatown is evolving in the borough with New Dorp being the main target as calling this the home of Staten Island's Chinatown with New Dorp Lane being the primary strip of an increasingly growing base of authentic Chinese businesses from eateries, educational services, home care services, pharmacies, and other social services. There is also now a large Chinese supermarket with a large parking space on 2380 Hylan Blvd called HL Supermarket. Currently the influx of Chinese businesses and residents are all spread out and mixed in with other non-Asian residents and businesses in New Dorp Lane which is very reminiscent of Bensonhurst's 86th Street between 18th - 25th Avenues back in the 2000s, which since the 2010s have become more than 50% majority Chinese becoming the 86th Street Bensonhurst Chinatown. However, the Chinese population including their authentic Chinese businesses in Staten Island are also spread out in many parts of the borough despite New Dorp being considered the borough's center of a growing Chinatown.

==== List ====
- Chinatowns of NYC:
  - Chinatown, Manhattan (紐約華埠)
    - Little Hong Kong/Guangdong (小香港/廣東)
    - Little Fuzhou (小福州)
    - East Harlem (東哈萊姆)
  - Chinatowns in Queens (皇后區):
    - Chinatown, Flushing (法拉盛華埠)
    - Chinatown, Elmhurst (唐人街, 艾姆赫斯特)
    - Corona, Queens
    - Whitestone, Queens (白石)
    - Long Island City (長島市)
  - Chinatowns in Brooklyn (布魯克林):
    - Chinatown, Sunset Park (布鲁克林華埠)
    - Chinatown, Avenue U (唐人街, U大道)
    - Chinatown, Bensonhurst (唐人街, 本森社区)
  - New Dorp, Staten Island(史丹頓島)

==== Long Island ====
Long Island comprises Brooklyn and Queens, as well as Nassau and Suffolk counties. Heavy Chinese migration is occurring from Brooklyn and Queens eastward, most notably settling into suburban Nassau County, the leading suburban destination for new Chinese immigrants in the United States, often in search of numerous public schools considered among the topmost in the U.S.

==== New Jersey ====
Bergen County, Middlesex County, Mercer County, Morris County, and Somerset County are all home to substantial Chinese communities, as are individual municipalities, most notably in Parsippany-Troy Hills, West Windsor, and Edison. Heavy Chinese migration is also occurring to central Jersey (as well as to neighboring Bucks County, Pennsylvania) near Princeton University. Numerous Chinese commercial establishments, including restaurants and supermarkets, serve these communities.

== Culture ==
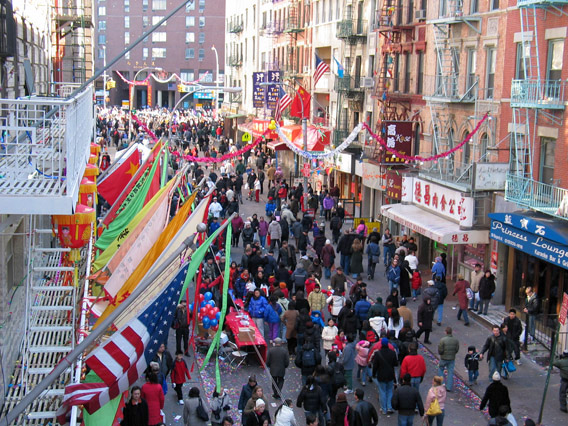
Street fairs (街頭慶祝活動) are common and are an integral institution in the cultural fabric of Chinatown in Manhattan.

=== Languages ===
For much of the overall history of the Chinese community in New York City, Taishanese was the dominant Chinese variety. After 1965, an influx of immigrants from Hong Kong made Cantonese the dominant dialect for the next three decades.

Later on, during the 1970s–80s, Mandarin- and Fuzhou-speaking immigrants began to arrive in New York City. Taiwanese immigrants were settling in Flushing, Queens, when it was still predominantly European American, while Fuzhou immigrants were settling in Manhattan's then very Cantonese-dominated Chinatown. The Taiwanese and Fuzhou people were the earliest significant numbers of Chinese immigrants to arrive in New York who spoke Mandarin but not Cantonese, although many spoke their regional Chinese dialects as well.

Since the mid-1990s, an influx of immigrants from various parts of mainland China has increased the influence of Mandarin in the Chinese-speaking world. Chinese parents often have their children learn Mandarin, regardless of their own linguistic background, and Mandarin is becoming the dominant lingua franca among the Chinese population in New York City. In the Manhattan Chinatown, many newer immigrants who speak Mandarin live around East Broadway, while Chinatowns in Brooklyn and Queens have also witnessed influxes of Mandarin-speaking Chinese immigrants, as well as Min Chinese and Southern Min speakers.

=== Demographics of New York City Chinese enclaves ===
In Queens, the Chinese communities consist of immigrants from various regions of China, who primarily speak Mandarin. Flushing's Chinatown, one of the largest Chinese communities in New York City, includes residents from various regions of China and Taiwan; the population of immigrants from Northeast China has grown in Flushing since the 2000s.

Manhattan's Chinatown and several Brooklyn enclaves retain significant Cantonese-speaking populations, reflecting earlier waves of immigration to New York City. The prevalence of Hong Kong–influenced cuisine and media has helped preserve the Cantonese language and culture in these areas.

Although Manhattan's Chinatown and Brooklyn's Chinese enclaves have substantial Fuzhou-speaking populations, Mandarin functions as one of several commonly used languages alongside Cantonese, rather than as the sole dominant language. Conversely, Mandarin serves as the predominant language, alongside various Chinese regional languages in Queens.

In Brooklyn, Fuzhou speakers predominate in the large Chinatown in Sunset Park, while the several smaller emerging Chinatowns in various sections of Bensonhurst and in a section of Sheepshead Bay primarily contain Cantonese speakers, unlike in Manhattan's Chinatown, where the Cantonese enclave and Fuzhou enclave are directly adjacent to each other. The relative use of Mandarin and Cantonese varies among the different Chinatown neighborhoods. In Bensonhurst and Sheepshead Bay, Cantonese is the predominant variety of Chinese spoken, with Mandarin used to a lesser extent. In contrast, Sunset Park's Chinatown has a larger Fuzhou-speaking population, where Mandarin is more widely used. In Manhattan's Chinatown, Cantonese is more prevalent in the western section, while Fuzhounese is more common in the eastern section. Cantonese and Mandarin are equally spoken there due to the high number of mainland Chinese visitors and Cantonese residents from other neighborhoods.

The Cantonese- and Fuzhou-speaking communities have historically included a higher proportion of working-class residents. Due in part to gentrification in Manhattan's Chinatown, Sunset Park has become a major destination for newly arrived Fuzhou immigrants, while Bensonhurst and Sheepshead Bay have seen increases in Cantonese-speaking arrivals. As a result, Brooklyn's Chinese communities have grown in size and prominence relative to Manhattan's Chinatown.

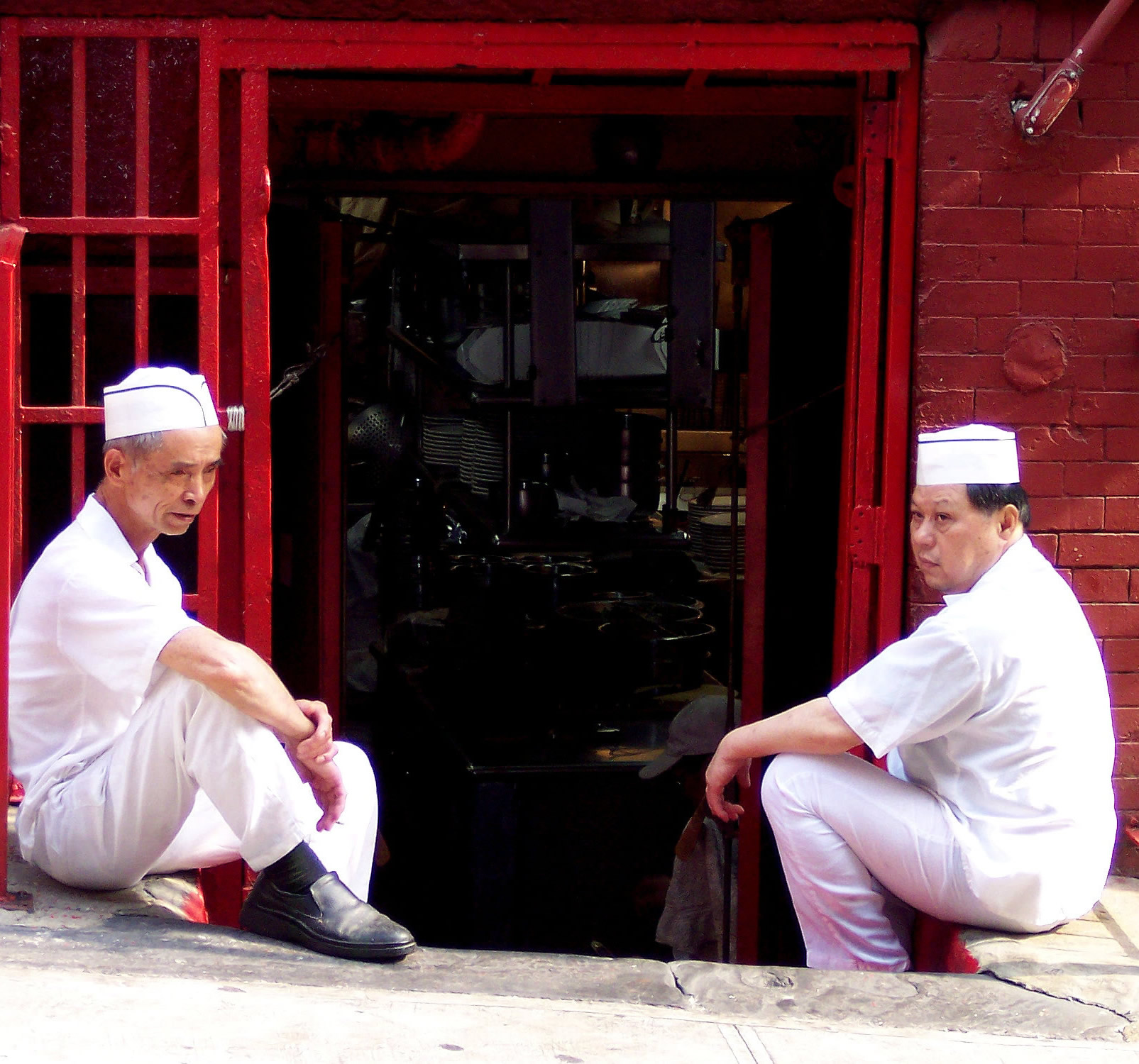
Cooks at a Manhattan Chinatown restaurant taking a break

=== Cuisine ===
Many popular styles of regional Chinese cuisine are available in New York City, including Hakka, Taiwanese, Shanghainese, Hunanese, Sichuanese, Cantonese, Fujianese, Xinjiang, Zhejiang, Korean-Chinese, and Malaysian Chinese cuisine. Even the relatively obscure Dongbei style of cuisine indigenous to Northeast China is now available in Flushing, Queens, as well as Mongolian cuisine and Uyghur cuisine.

==== Kosher preparation of Chinese food ====
Kosher preparation of Chinese food is widely available in New York City, serving the metropolitan area's large Jewish and particularly Orthodox Jewish populations. Many American Jews eat at Chinese restaurants on Christmas Day, a tradition that may have arisen from the lack of other open restaurants on Christmas Day, as well as the close proximity of Jewish and Chinese immigrants to each other in New York City. Kosher Chinese food is usually prepared in New York City, as well as in other large cities with Orthodox Jewish neighborhoods, under strict rabbinical supervision as a prerequisite for Kosher certification.

=== News media ===
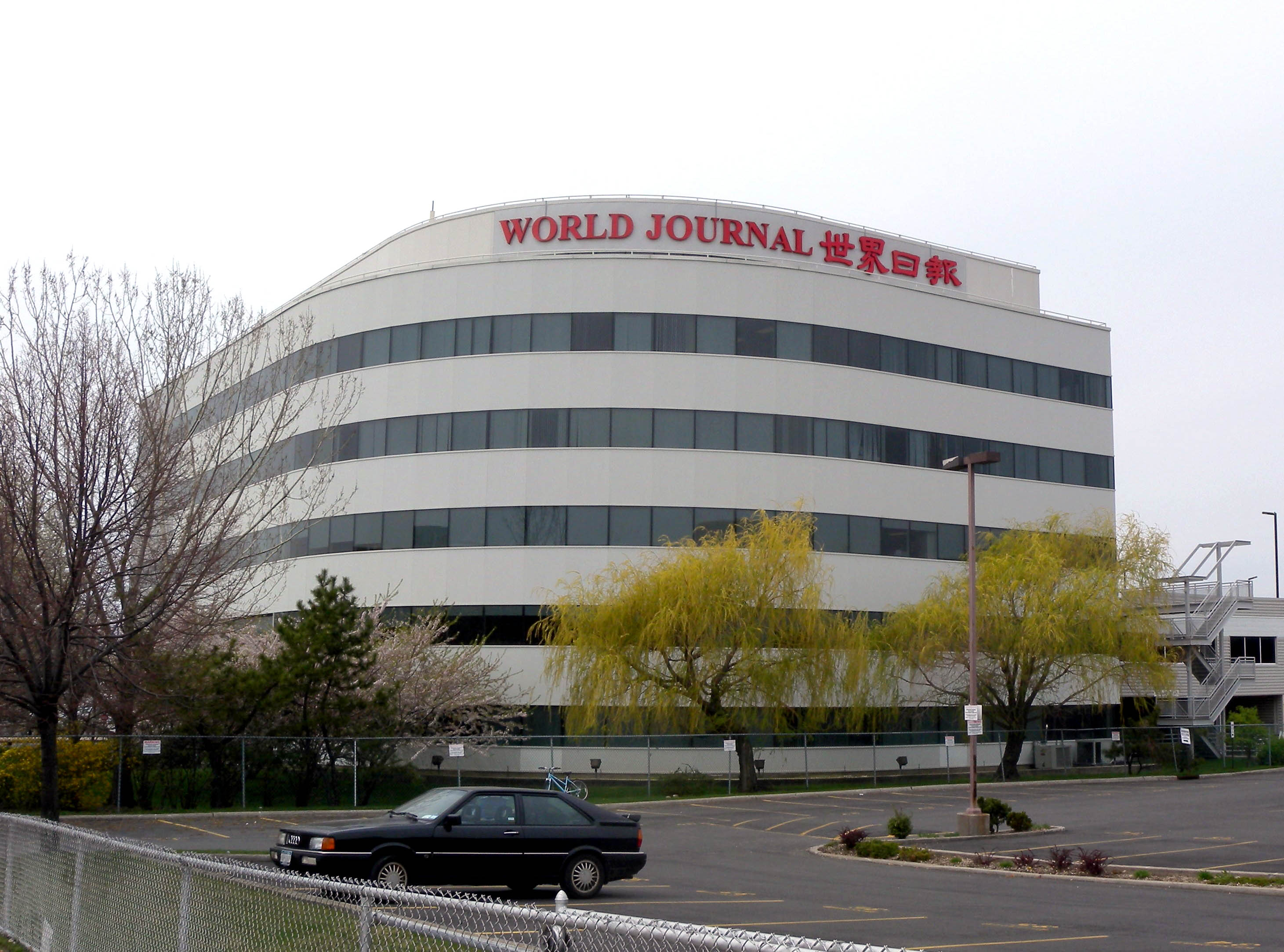
The World Journal headquarters in Whitestone (白石) / College Point (大學點), Queens

Numerous media publications geared toward serving the Chinese diaspora are headquartered in the New York metropolitan area. The World Journal, one of the largest Chinese-language newspapers outside of Asia, has its headquarters in Whitestone (白石), Queens.

The China Press is headquartered in Midtown Manhattan. The Epoch Times, an international far-right multi-language newspaper and media company affiliated with the Falun Gong new religious movement, is also headquartered in Manhattan. The Hong Kong-based, multinational Chinese-language newspaper Sing Tao Daily maintains its overseas headquarters in Chinatown, Manhattan. The Beijing-based, English-language newspaper China Daily publishes a U.S. edition, which is based in the 1500 Broadway skyscraper in Times Square. Sino Monthly and Global Chinese Times are published in Edison, Middlesex County, New Jersey, to serve a growing global readership and New Jersey's growing Chinese population.

=== Museums ===
The Museum of Chinese in America at 215 Centre Street in the Manhattan Chinatown has documented the Chinese American experience since 1980.

=== Chinese Lunar New Year ===
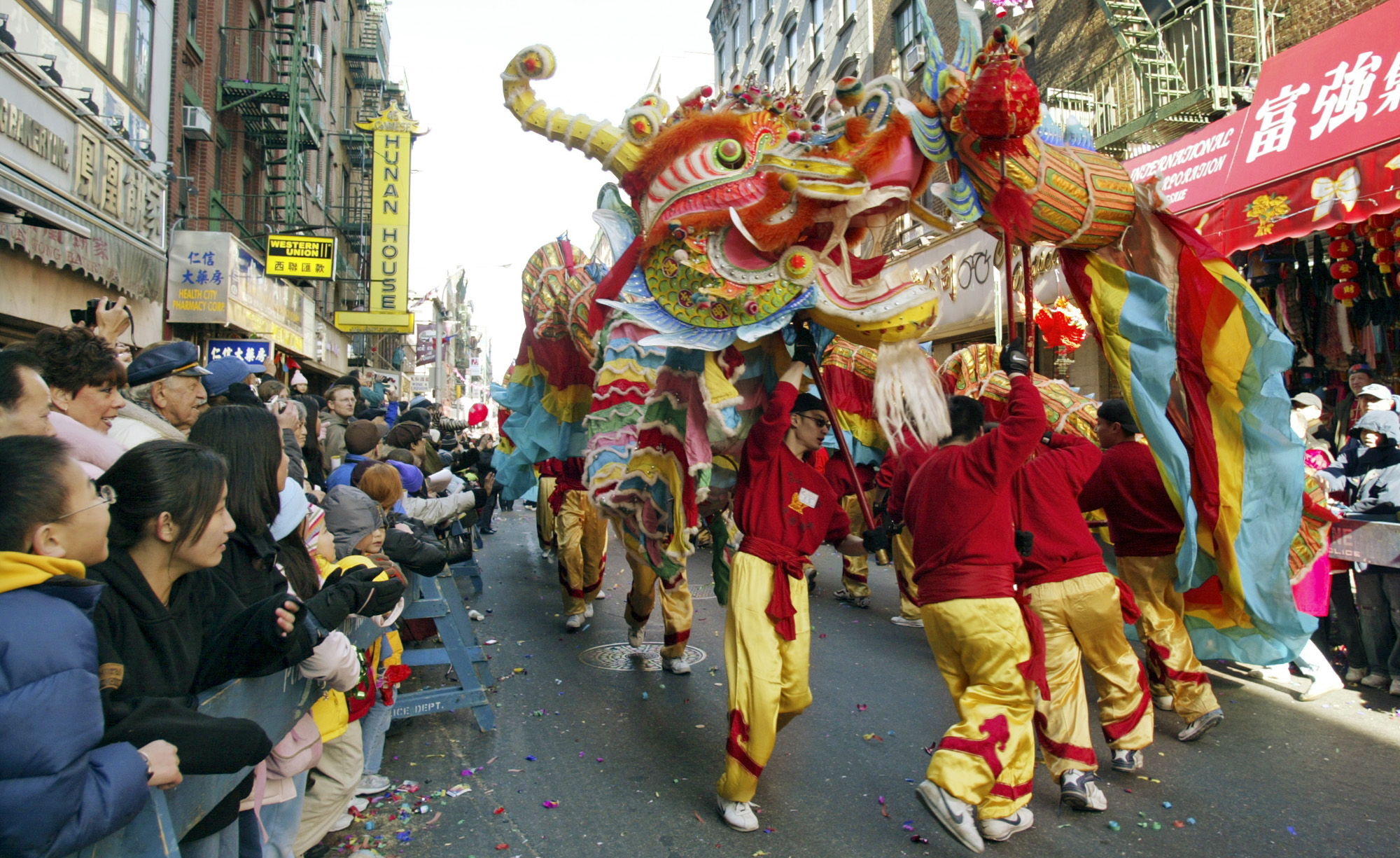
Chinese Lunar New Year (農曆新年) celebration in Manhattan Chinatown

Chinese Lunar New Year is celebrated annually throughout New York City's Chinatowns. Chinese New Year was signed into law as an allowable school holiday in the State of New York by Governor Andrew Cuomo in December 2014, as absentee rates had run as high as 60% in some New York City schools on this day. In June 2015, New York City Mayor Bill de Blasio declared that the Lunar New Year would be made a public school holiday; and in September 2023, New York State made Lunar New Year a mandatory public school holiday.

=== Religion ===
- Protestantism (see also Chinese American church)
- Dragon Springs, just north of NYC in Orange County, is a center for Falun Gong.

Beginning in 2006 many Chinese Catholics began worshipping at St. John Vianney Church in Flushing.

== Education ==
P.S. 184 is a public school in Manhattan's Chinatown, as part of the New York City Department of Education, that offers a dual-language instructional program in Mandarin and English. Conversely, the Yung Wing school, also in Manhattan's Chinatown and known additionally as P.S. 124, is an elementary school within the New York City Department of Education, and all students at the YingHua International School in nearby Kingston, New Jersey, are fluent in Mandarin by 8th grade. Chinese Americans compose a disproportionate enrollment relative to the general population in the nine elite public high schools of New York City, including Stuyvesant High School and Bronx Science High School.

=== Chinese schools ===
The New York City metropolitan area contains several extracurricular Chinese schools for children and adults in the Chinese community that offer lessons in the Chinese language and culture. The Huaxia Chinese School system, which teaches Simplified Chinese, operates in several locations in New York, New Jersey, Pennsylvania, and Connecticut.

== Transportation ==
Numerous New York City Subway routes directly serve the multiple Chinatowns of New York City. The BMT Fourth Avenue Line (D, N, and R trains) and BMT Brighton Line (B and Q trains) connect Chinese communities in Lower Manhattan and Brooklyn. The Little Fuzhou neighborhood within Chinatown, Manhattan, hosts the East Broadway station on the IND Sixth Avenue Line (F and <F> trains). Avenue U is served by the B and Q trains, while Sunset Park is served by the N and R trains, and Bensonhurst is served by the D, R, and W trains. The IRT Lexington Avenue Line (4, 5, 6, and <6> trains) serves the burgeoning Chinese community of East Harlem in Upper Manhattan. Meanwhile, Flushing in Queens is served by the IRT Flushing Line (7 and <7> trains) of the New York City Subway, as well as by four stations of the Long Island Rail Road (LIRR)'s Port Washington Branch.

Subway and commuter rail routes in New York City's Chinatowns
Borough	Line	Route	Neighborhoods served	Notable stations
Brooklyn	BMT Brighton Line	"B" train "Q" train	Avenue U	Avenue U
Brooklyn	BMT Fourth Avenue Line	"N" train "R" train	Sunset Park	53rd Street, 59th Street
Brooklyn	BMT Sea Beach Line	"N" train	Sunset Park	Eighth Avenue, Fort Hamilton Parkway
Brooklyn	BMT West End Line	"D" train "R" train "W" train	Bensonhurst	20th Avenue, Bay Parkway
Manhattan	IND Sixth Avenue Line	"F" train "F" express train	Little Fuzhou	East Broadway
Manhattan	IND Sixth Avenue Line	"B" train "D" train	Manhattan Chinatown	Grand Street
Manhattan	BMT Broadway Line	"N" train "Q" train "R" train "W" train	Manhattan Chinatown	Canal Street
Manhattan	BMT Nassau Street Line	"J" train "Z" train	Manhattan Chinatown	Bowery, Canal Street
Manhattan	IRT Lexington Avenue Line	"6" train "6" express train	Manhattan Chinatown	Canal Street
Manhattan	IRT Lexington Avenue Line	"6" train "6" express train	East Harlem	110th Street, 116th Street
Queens	IND Queens Boulevard Line	"M" train "R" train	Elmhurst	Elmhurst Avenue, Grand Avenue–Newtown
Queens	IRT Flushing Line	"7" train "7" express train	Flushing	Flushing–Main Street
Queens	LIRR	Port Washington Branch	Flushing	Flushing–Main Street, Murray Hill, Broadway, Auburndale

A system of dollar vans operates between the different Chinatowns in New York City. The dollar vans (which are distinct from, and not to be confused with, Chinatown bus lines), go from Manhattan's Chinatown to places in Sunset Park, Brooklyn; Elmhurst, Queens; and Flushing, Queens. There is also a service from Flushing to Sunset Park that does not pass through Manhattan. Contrary to their name, the dollar vans' fares are $2.50, which is cheaper than the New York City transit fares of $2.75 as of 2015.

There are also intercity bus services that operate from the Chinatowns in New York City.

The two largest Taiwanese airlines have provided free shuttle services to and from John F. Kennedy International Airport in New York City for customers based in New Jersey.

- China Airlines's service stops in Fort Lee, Parsippany, and Jersey City
- EVA Air's service stops in Jersey City, Piscataway, Fort Lee, and East Hanover.

== Organizations ==
The Chinese American Planning Council is headquartered on the Lower East Side of Manhattan. It supports initiatives such as Project Reach NYC. Chinese American associations include the Sino-American Friendship Association, the Millburn-Short Hills Chinese Association (MSHCA; Chinese: 蜜尔本华人协会; pinyin: Mìěrběn Huárén Xiéhuì) in New Jersey, which hosts a moon festival each year. 2005 is the year of the organization's establishments.

The Long Island Chinese American Association (LICAA) serves the Chinese Americans on Long Island. As of 2020, Gordon Zhang is the president. Other associations include Chinese American Association of North Hempstead and the Herricks Chinese Association.

== Political influence ==
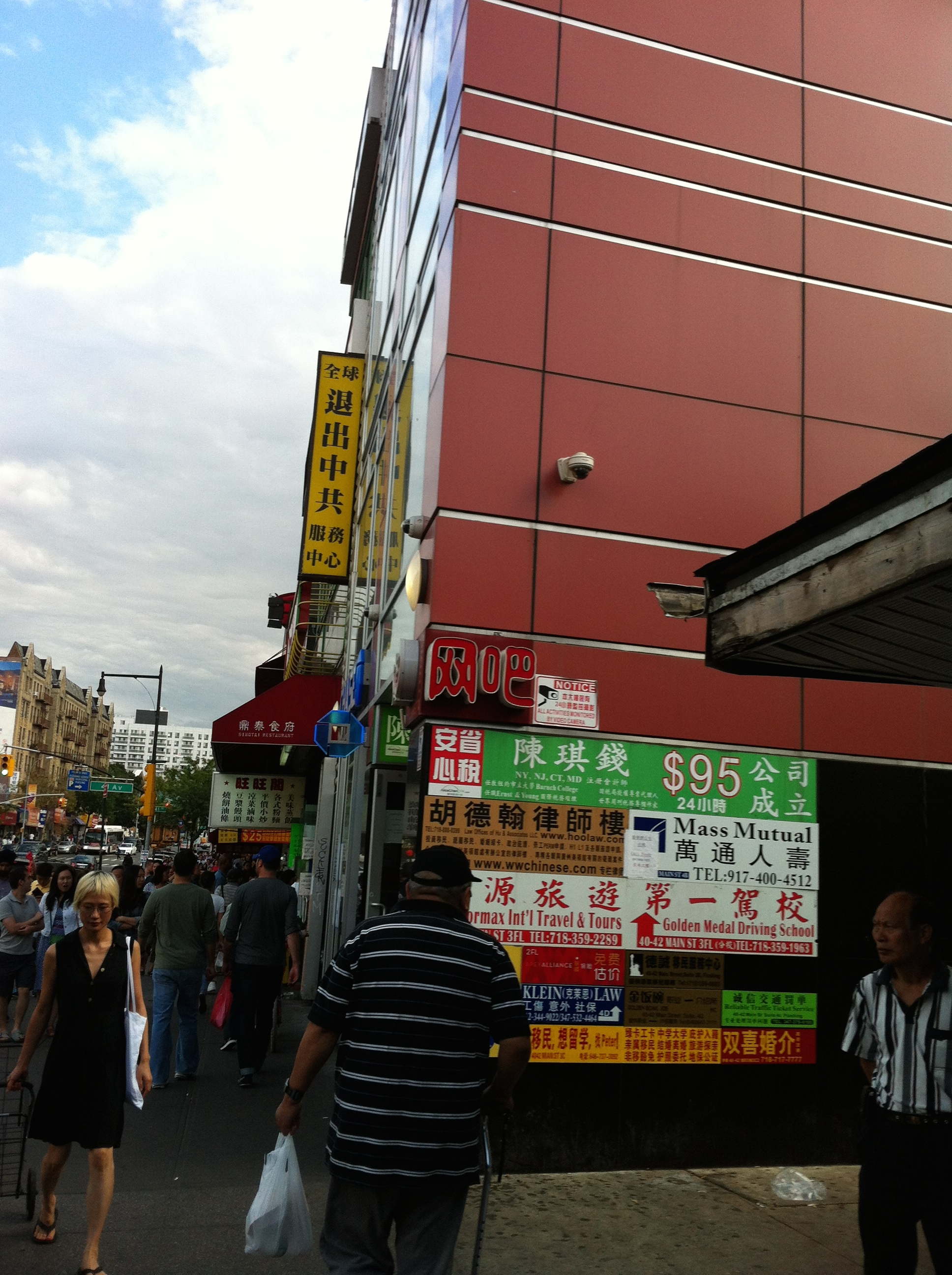
The Tuidang Service Center, based on Main Street in Flushing Chinatown, urges renunciation of the Chinese Communist Party by China.

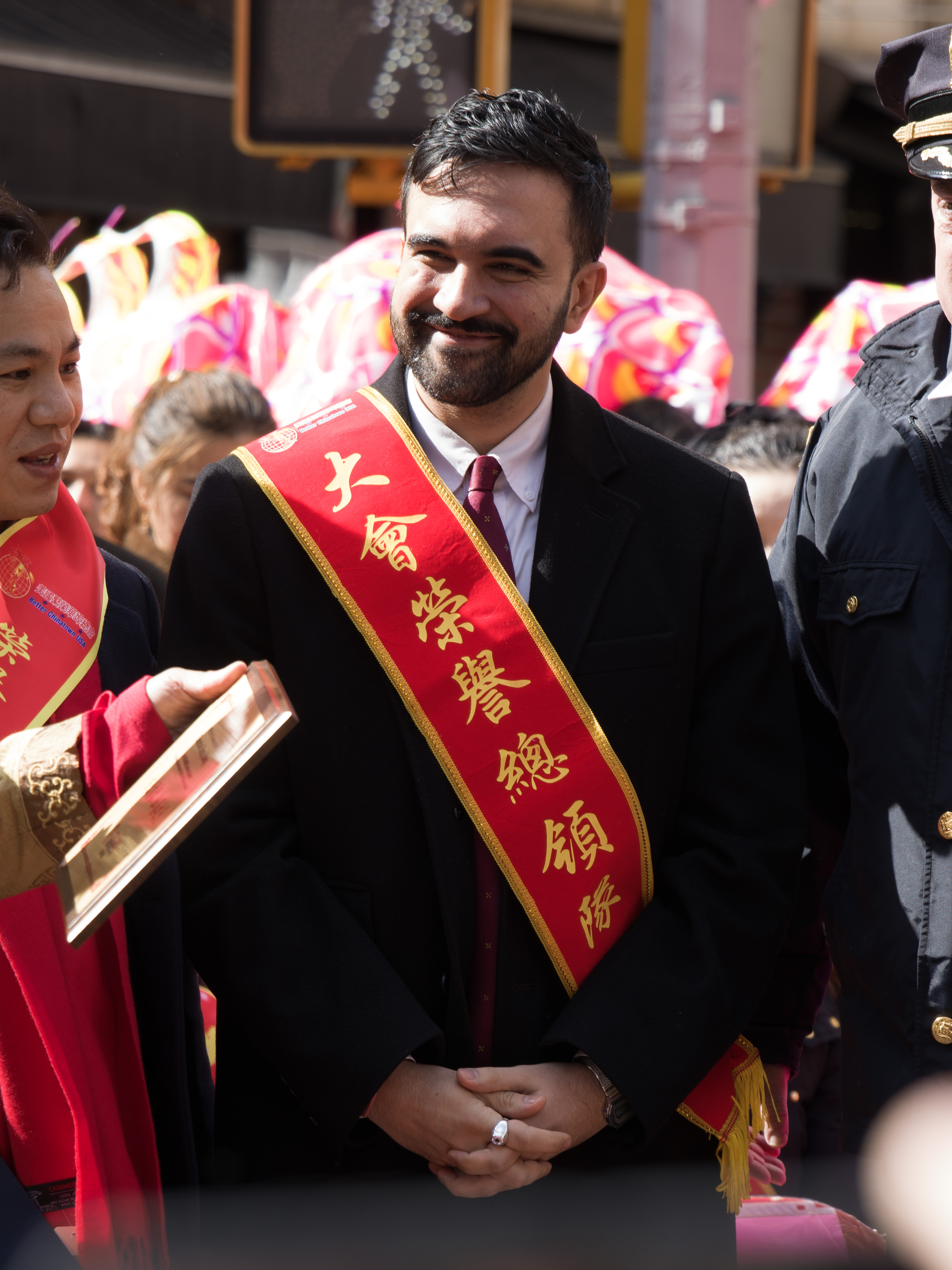
Mayor Zohran Mamdani at a Chinese New Year celebration in 2026

In 1933, the leftist Chinese Hand Laundry Alliance formed to advocate for thousands of Chinese laundry workers when New York City passed a heavy tax targeting Chinese.

The political stature of Chinese Americans in New York City has become prominent.

As of 2017, Guo Wengui, a self-claimed Chinese billionaire turned political activist, has been in self-imposed exile in New York City, where he owns an apartment worth $68 million on the Upper East Side of Manhattan, overlooking Central Park. He has continued to conduct a political agenda to bring attention to alleged corruption in the Chinese political system from his New York home. In July 2024, Guo was convicted of fraud in New York.

Taiwan-born John Liu, former New York City Council member representing District 20, which includes Flushing Chinatown and other northern Queens neighborhoods, was elected New York City Comptroller in November 2009, becoming the first Asian American to be elected to a citywide office in New York City. Concomitantly, Peter Koo, born in Shanghai, was elected to succeed Liu to assume this council membership seat. Peter Koo ran as a Republican and was elected as a Republican to the New York City Council in November 2009. He changed his party affiliation to a member of the Democratic Party in 2012 and was re-elected to the city council as a Democrat in November 2013.

Margaret Chin became the first Chinese American woman representing Manhattan's Chinatown on the New York City Council, elected in 2009. Grace Meng, an American-born Taiwanese, has been a member of the United States House of Representatives, representing New York's 6th congressional district in Queens, since 2009. Of the more than 2,100 Asian Americans within the uniformed ranks of the New York Police Department (NYPD) in 2015 – about six percent of the total – roughly half were Chinese American, NYPD statistics show, a number which has grown tenfold since 1990. Yuh-Line Niou is a Taiwanese-American Democratic Party member of the New York State Assembly representing the 65th district in Lower Manhattan, elected in 2016, taking over the seat previously held by Sheldon Silver.

In November 2014, Nancy Tong became the first Chinese American Democrat elected female district leader in Kings County (the borough of Brooklyn). In November 2022, Iwen Chu, a resident of Brooklyn, was elected to The New York State Senate as a Democrat. In November 2023, Susan Zhuang, born in mainland China and living in Brooklyn, was elected to the New York City Council as a Democrat. In November 2022, Lester Chang, who was born in Manhattan and lives in Brooklyn, was elected to The New York State Assembly, representing southern Brooklyn as a Republican. Steve Chan was elected to the New York State Senate in November 2024 as a Republican representing Bensonhurst and other parts of southern Brooklyn.

In 2021, Republican Party politicians, including Curtis Sliwa, who ran for Mayor of New York City, attracted Chinese American voters who opposed Democratic Party policies in education and crime.

== Economic influence ==
The economic influence of Chinese in New York City is growing as well. The majority of cash purchases of New York City real estate in the first half of 2015 were transacted by Chinese as a combination of overseas Chinese and Chinese Americans. The top three surnames of cash purchasers of Manhattan real estate during that time period were Chen, Liu, and Wong. Chinese have also invested billions of dollars into New York commercial real estate since 2013. According to China Daily, the ferris wheel under construction on Staten Island, slated to be among the world's tallest and most expensive with an estimated cost of $500 million, has received $170 million in funding from approximately 300 Chinese investors through the U.S. EB-5 immigrant investor program, which grants permanent residency to foreign investors in exchange for job-creating investments in the United States, with Chinese immigrating to New York City dominating this list. Chinese billionaires have been buying New York property to be used as pied-à-terres, often priced in the tens of millions of U.S. dollars each, and as of 2016, middle-class Chinese investors were purchasing real estate in New York. Chinese companies have also been raising billions of dollars on stock exchanges in New York via initial public offerings. Major Chinese banks have maintained operational offices in New York City.

== Working class Chinese residents living in affordable housing programs ==
The Chinese American communities in New York often have been viewed as having a high rate of property ownership, which has caused the lower working class income Chinese New Yorkers who are renters to be overlooked and often many of them are rent burdened. This is due to the fact that within the NYC Chinese communities, more than 50% are property owners while less than 50% are renters. New York City's Chinese communities have now been impacted by gentrification in New York City causing property values and rent in the city's Chinatowns to increase, and now many working class Chinese New Yorkers lacking property buying capital have been placing themselves on the waiting lists for various affordable housing programs and developments such as NYCHA, Mitchell Lama, LIHTC, and Section 8 and upon being selected for a housing opportunity are taking the offers and dispersing into many parts of the city with their presence increasingly noticeable in traditionally non-Asian neighborhoods. Very often, many of them are selected for offers far away from the Chinese enclaves having to take long transportation rides to come back for their cultural necessities while only a handful of them are sometimes luckily selected for offers in closer proximity to the Chinese enclaves. The trend has been happening since the 2000s and have been continuously accelerating. While this benefits them financially and housing wise, sometimes for those further away from the Chinese enclaves experience cultural and social isolation especially when there is a language barrier as well as challenges with making transport travels to come back to the Chinese communities for their necessities especially for the elders as spoken in some reports.

=== Dispersed Locations ===
Although the Chinese residents moving into government housing developments are being dispersed in many parts of NYC, East Harlem, Fort Greene, and Long Island City have been significantly reported as having significant growing numbers of Chinese New Yorkers in the affordable housing developments in these areas.There was even an article from 2009 speaking about Chinese families living in NYCHA housing developments in Brownsville and Coney Island of Brooklyn including speaking about the cultural and social isolation as a result of language barriers and being further away from the nearest Chinese enclaves in the city. CUNY TV even uploaded a video on YouTube called "Co-op City, The Bronx | DiverseCITY" that spoke about Mitchell Lama's Co op City located in The Bronx that spoke of the multicultural diverse residents including seeing an influx of Asian residents that also include Chinese residents. Co op City also uploaded the same video onto their own YouTube channel. East Harlem's Franklin Plaza also run by Mitchell Lama also has seen an influx of Chinese residents as well.

=== Cultural/Socioeconomic Challenges ===
In 2023, an NYU Journalist Aria Young conducted an interview video with the Chinese speaking elders living in NYCHA's Carver Houses in East Harlem reflecting on their experiences about being socially and culturally isolated due to the language barriers and very limited numbers of Chinese residents in the neighborhood as well as being far away from Manhattan's Chinatown in which the interview video was posted on YouTube called "Out Of Place: Asian Seniors in East Harlem Public Housing" including even speaking of experiencing racially motivated harassment. There was also a very big case of Yao Pan Ma living in a NYCHA development in East Harlem who was attacked while trying to collect cans and bottles to bring to the recycling center to make money, which the attack was a result of motivated racism and Yao Pan Ma later died in the hospital, the culprit who attacked him was arrested later on. There also have been reported cases where the Chinese residents living in NYCHA developments throughout the city not able to communicate with NYCHA representatives about apartment issues due to language barriers in which some local community resource centers and leaders have had to step in the bring attention to this to improve or increase more translation services for their residents.

== Notable people ==
Chinese New Yorkers (紐約華人)

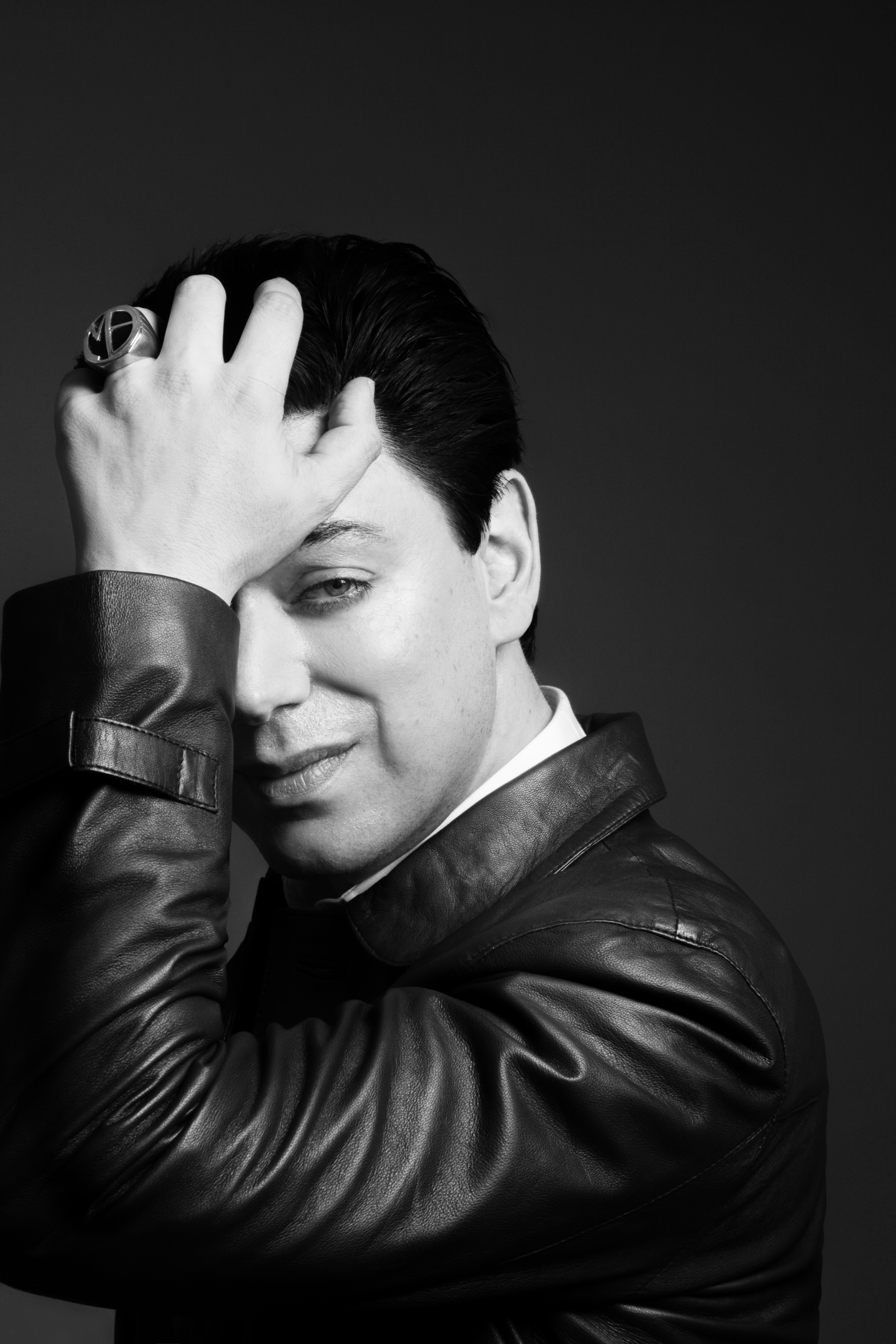
Malan Breton

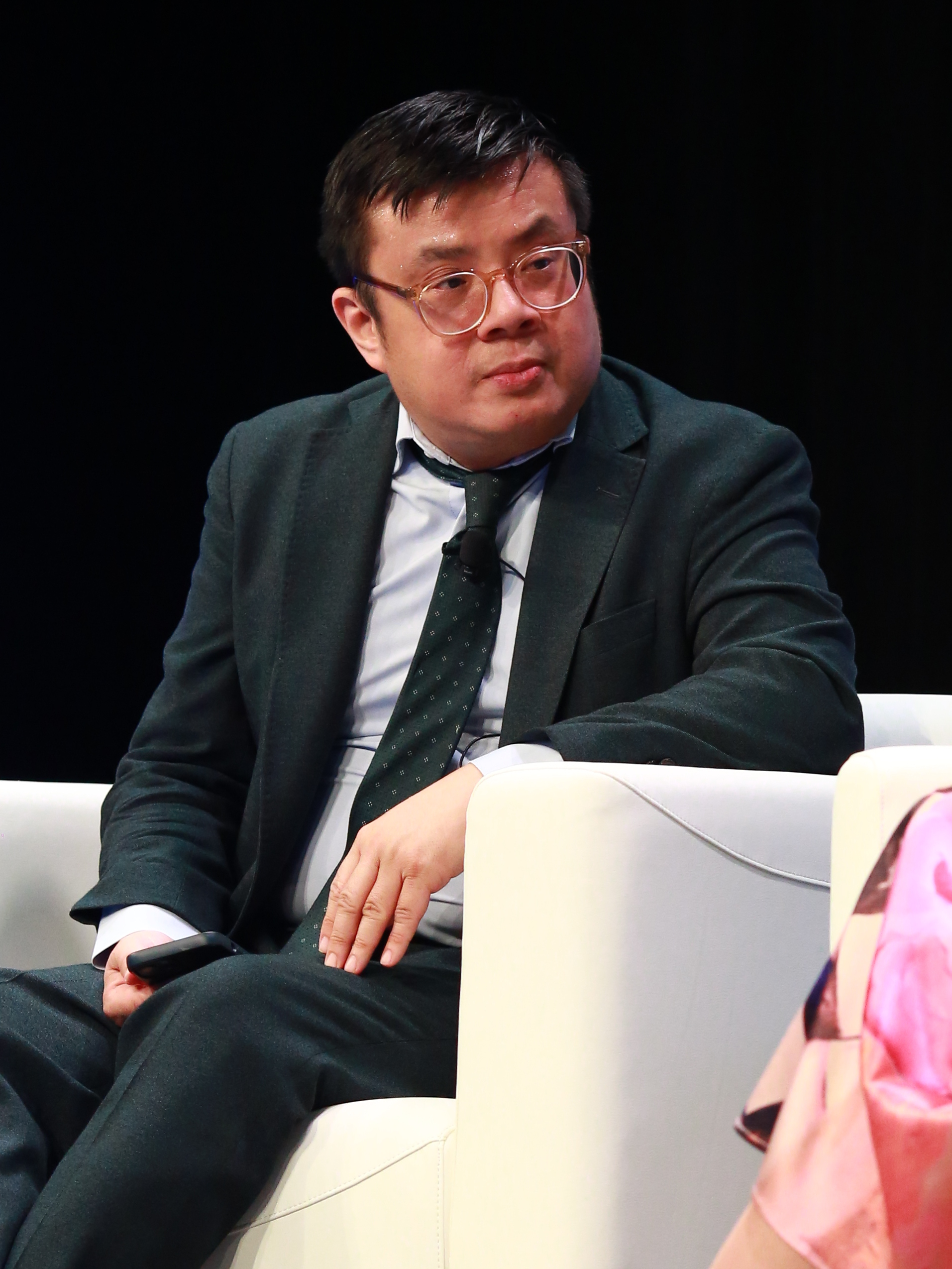
Sewell Chan

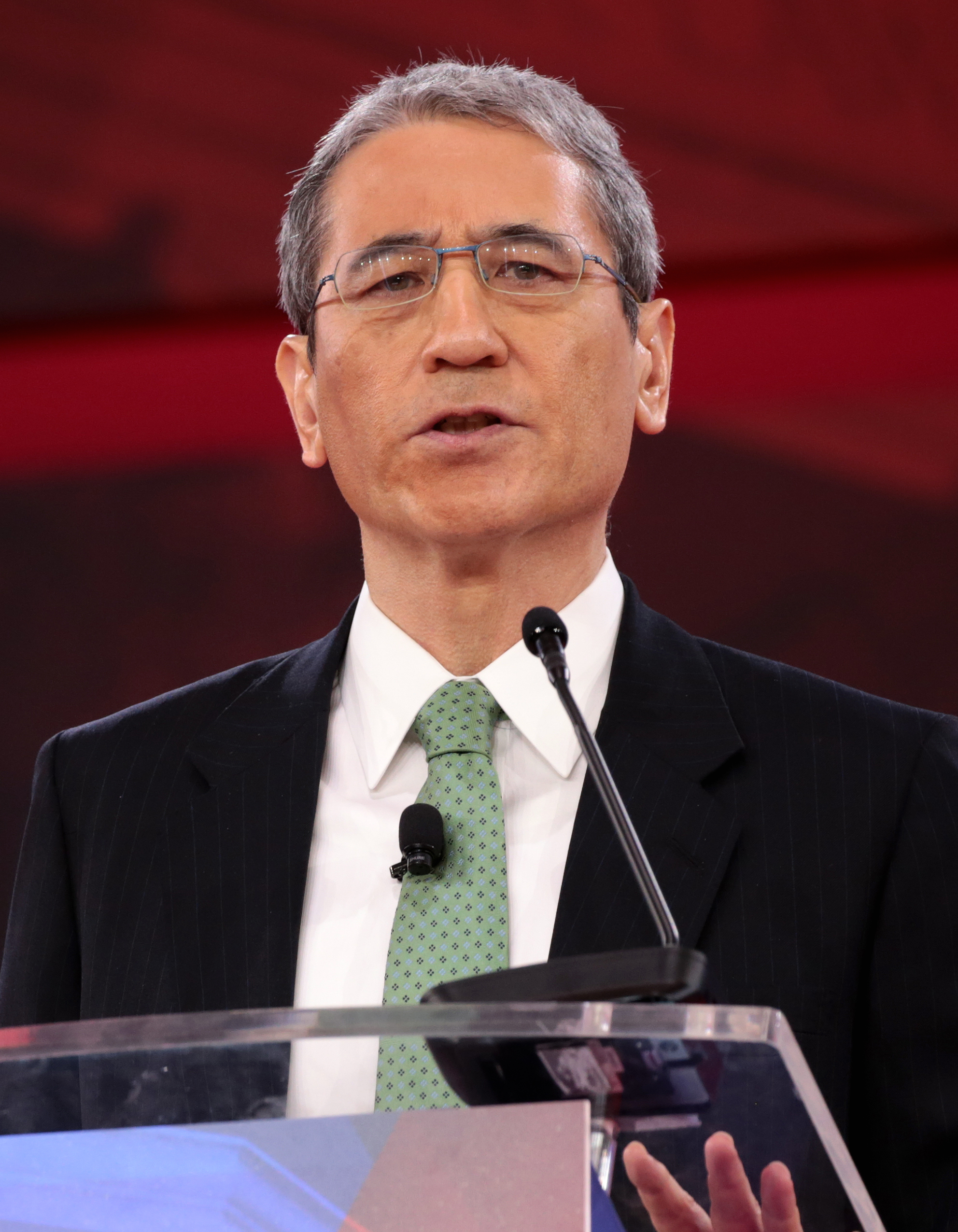
Gordon G. Chang

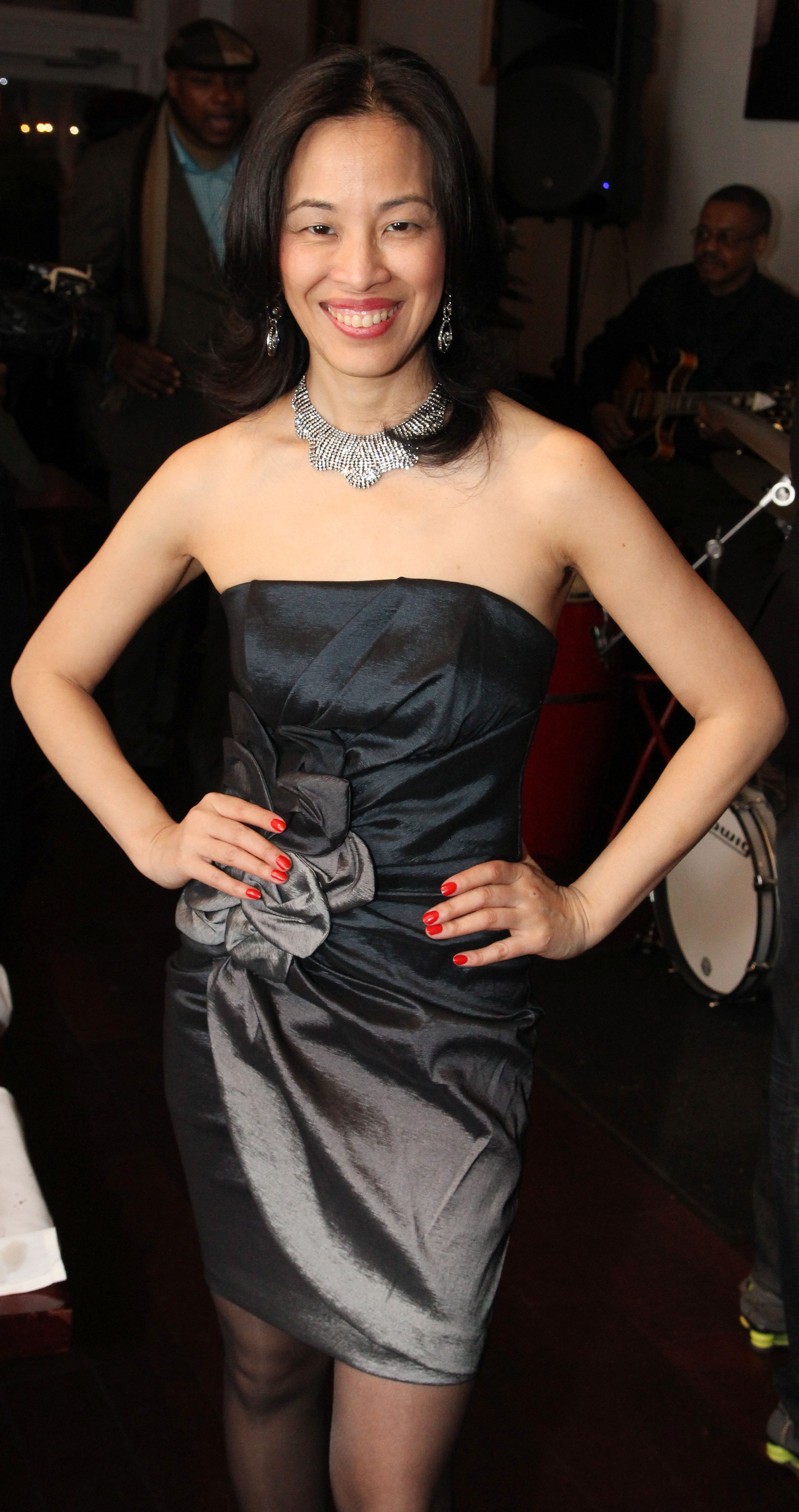
Lia Chang

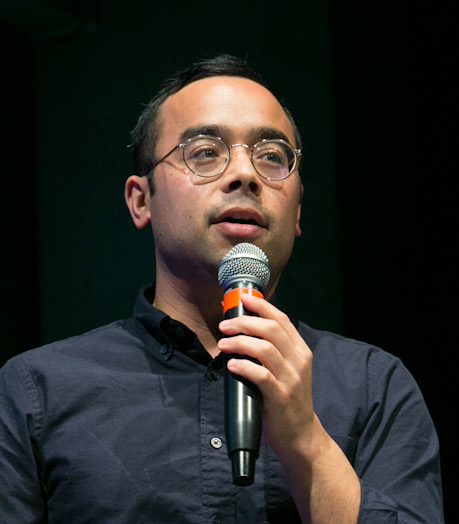
Adrian Chen

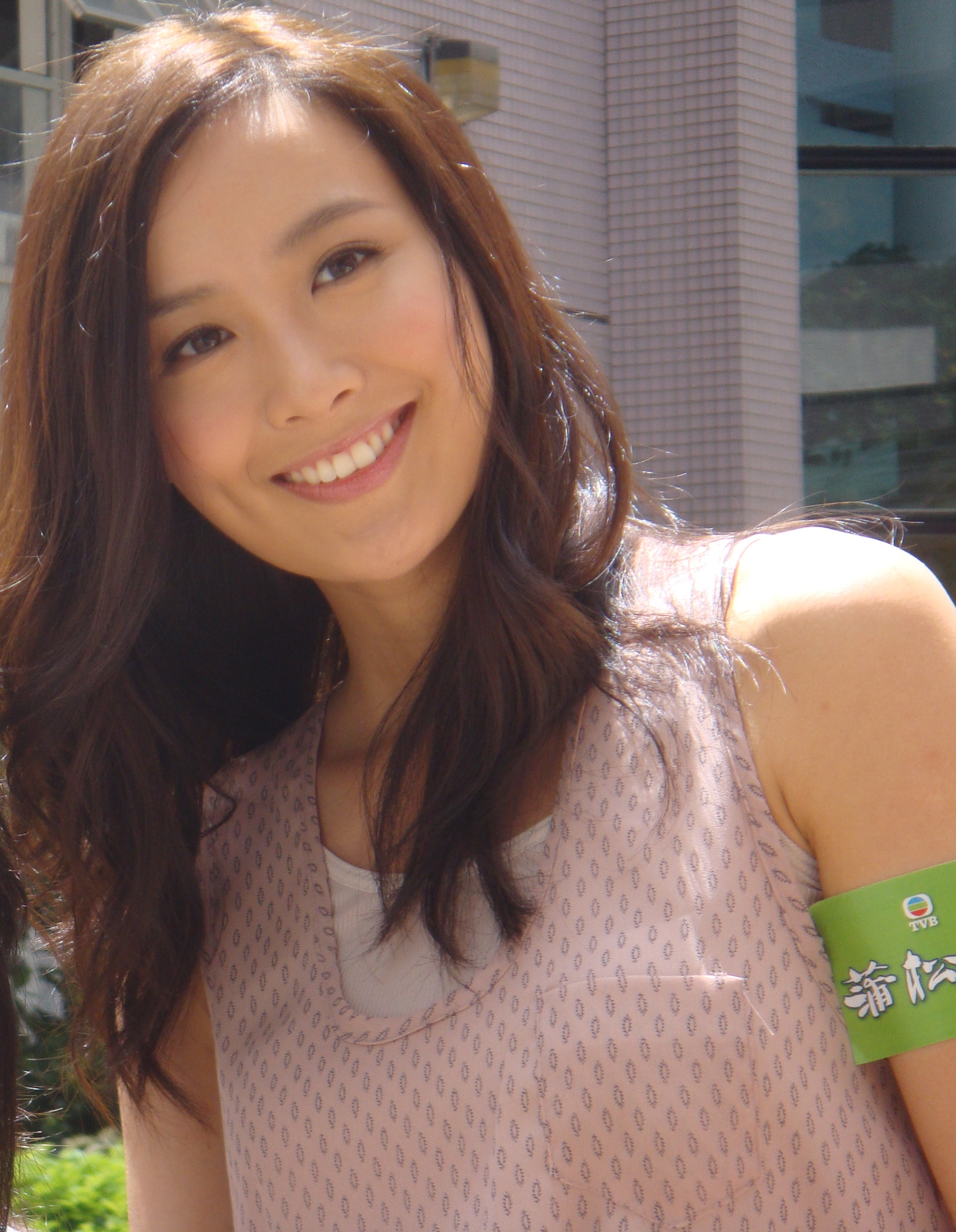
Fala Chen

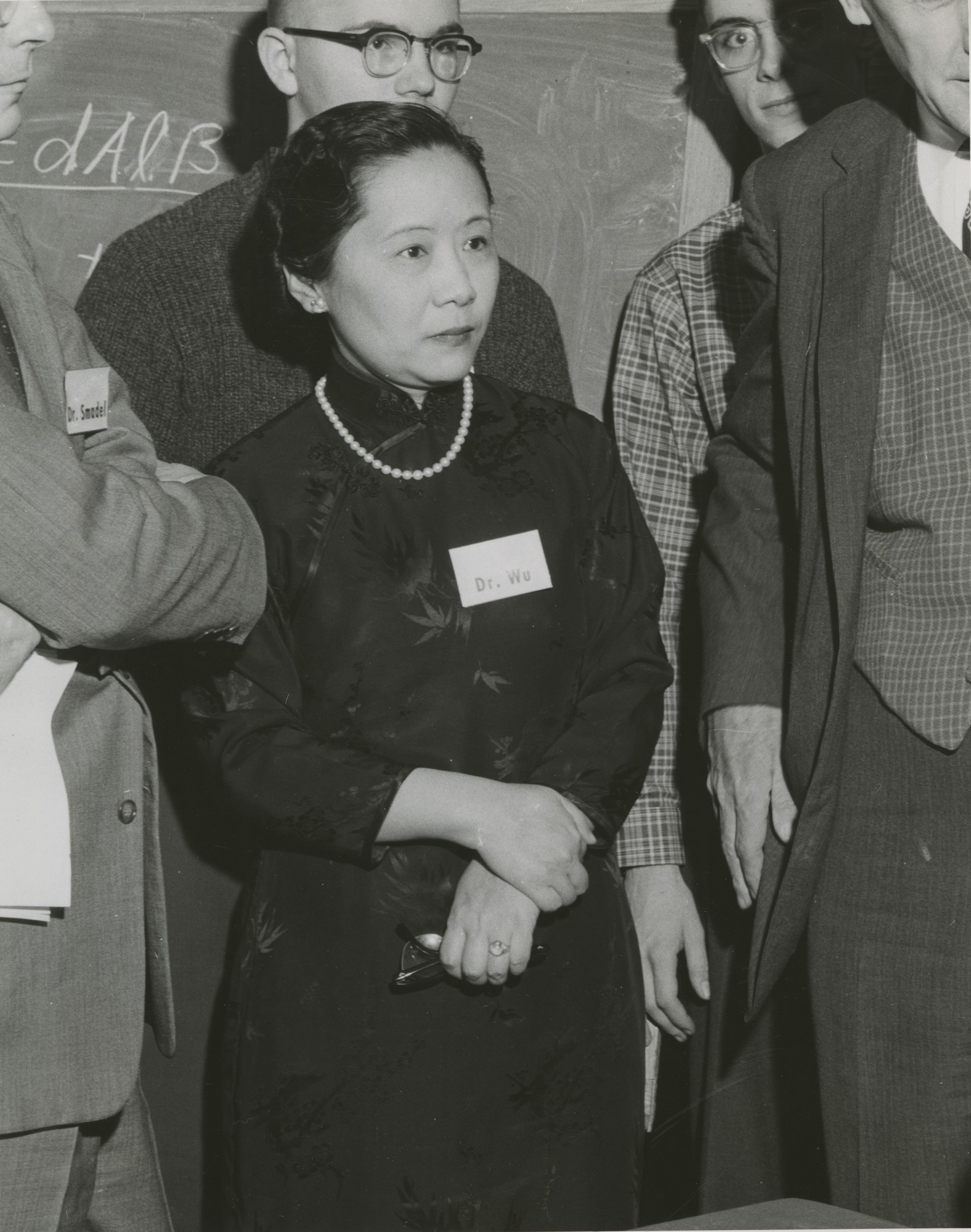
Chien-Shiung Wu

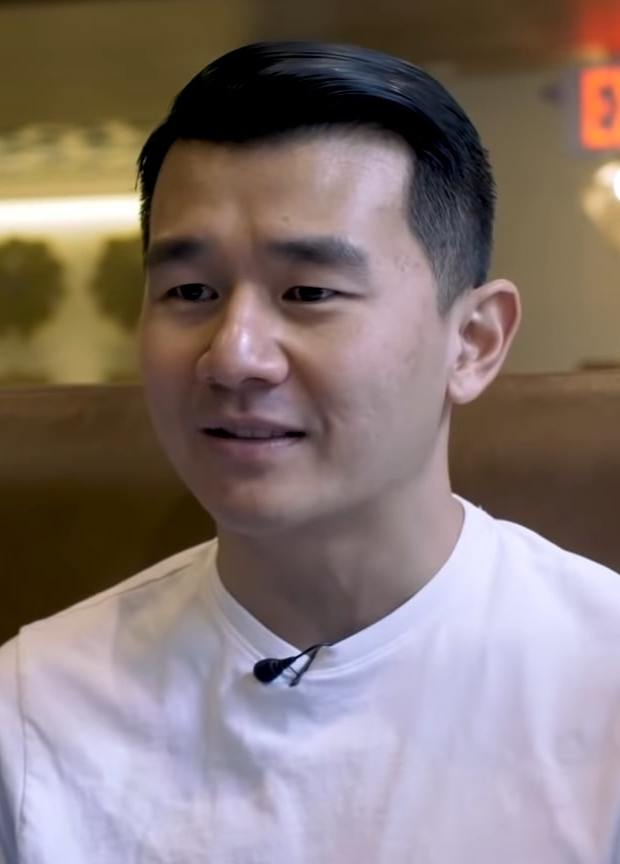
Ronny Chieng

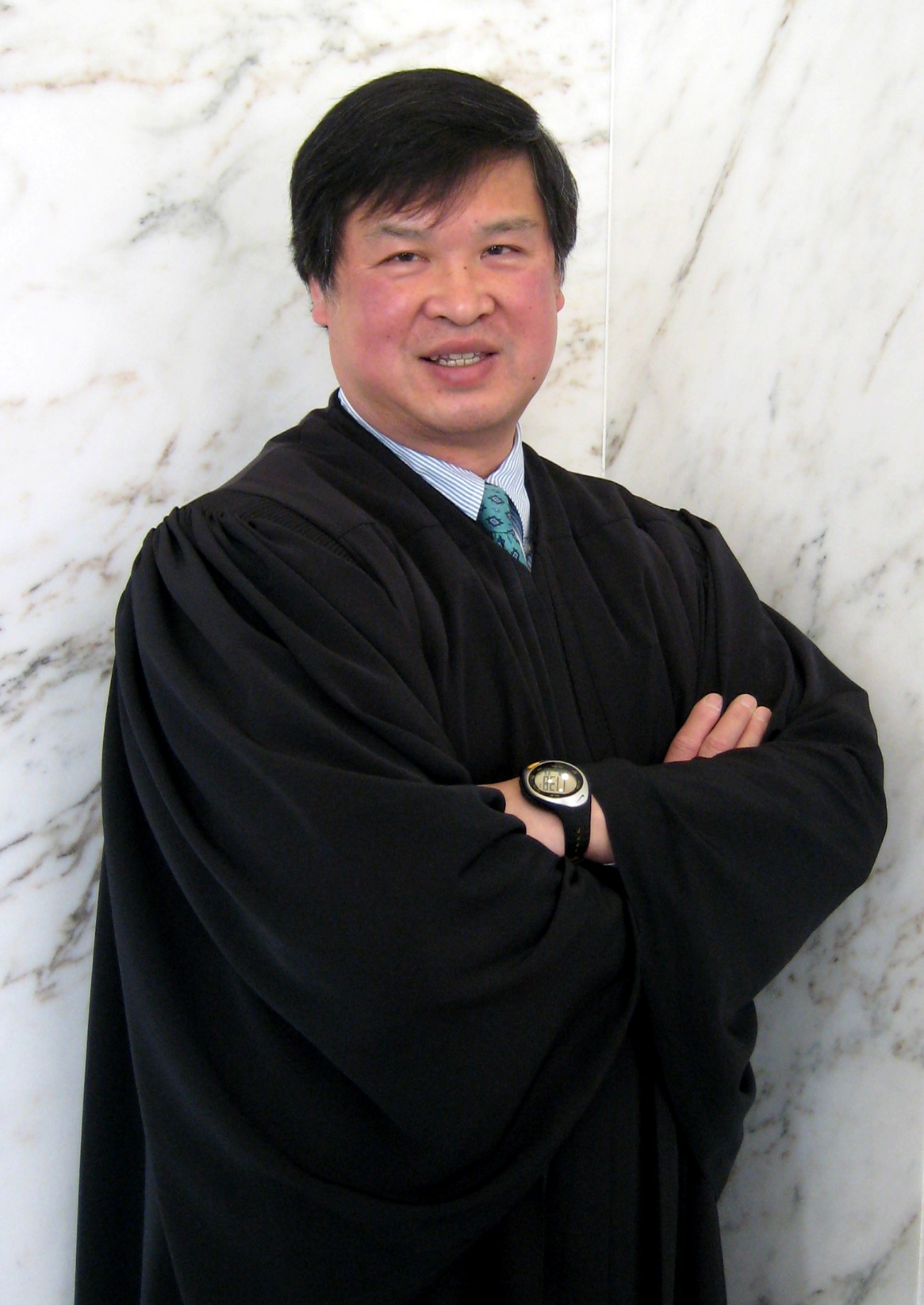
Denny Chin

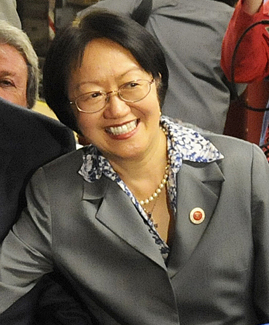
Margaret Chin

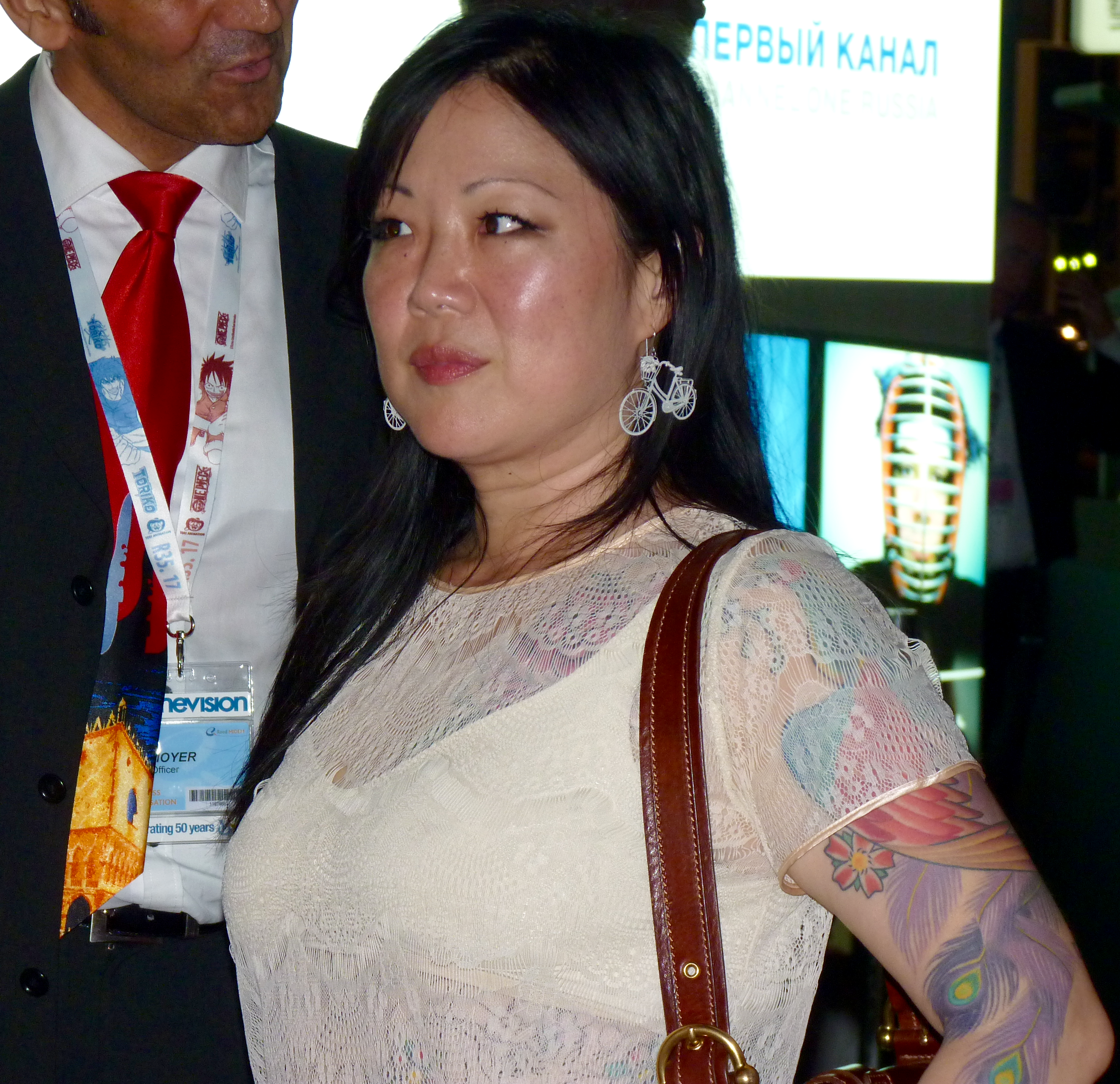
Margaret Cho

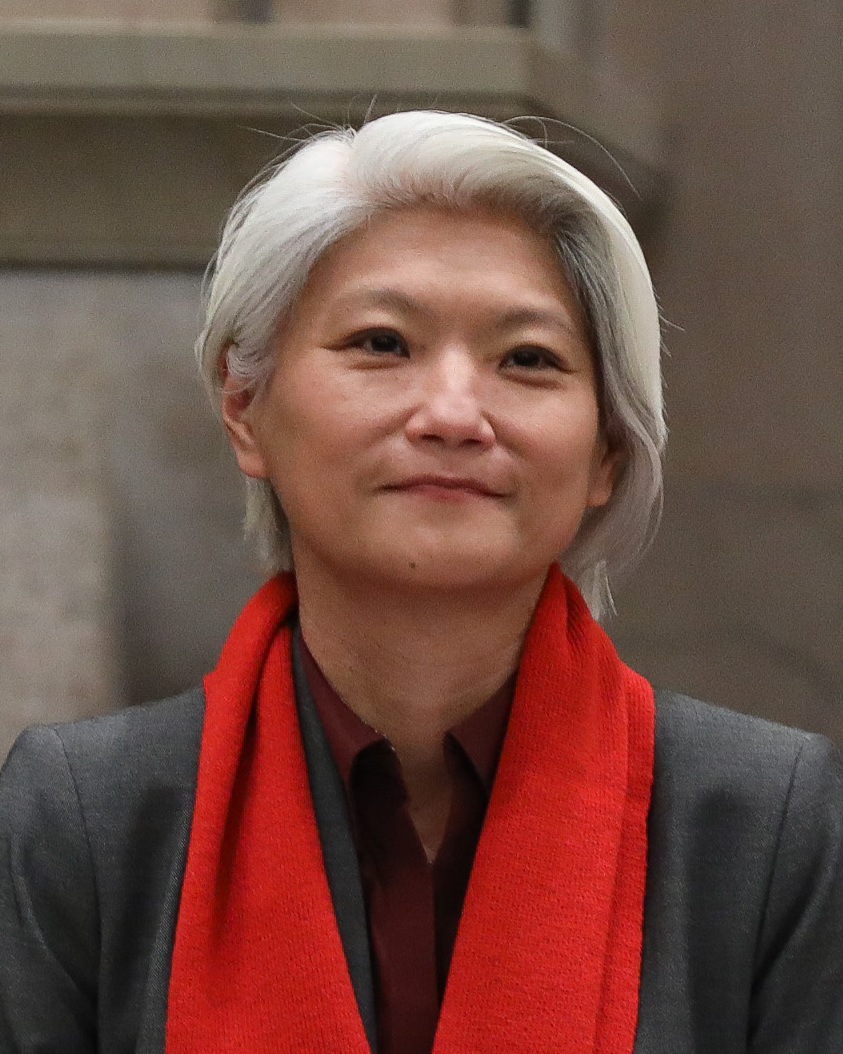
Iwen Chu

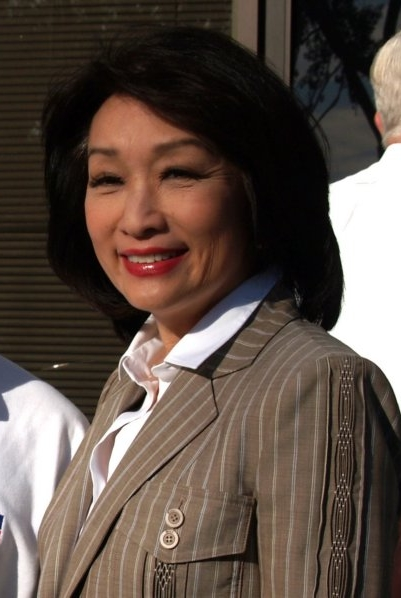
Connie Chung

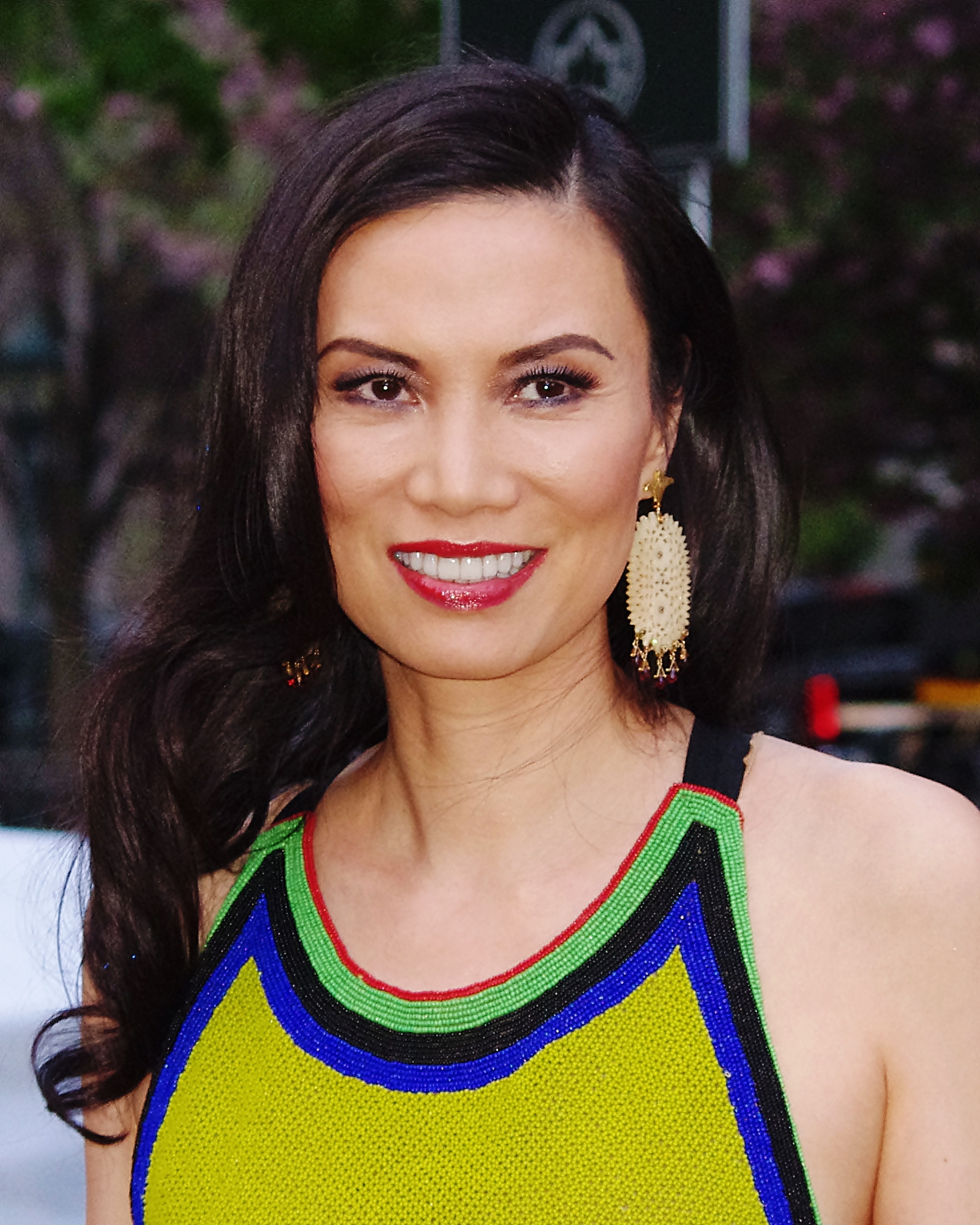
Wendi Deng

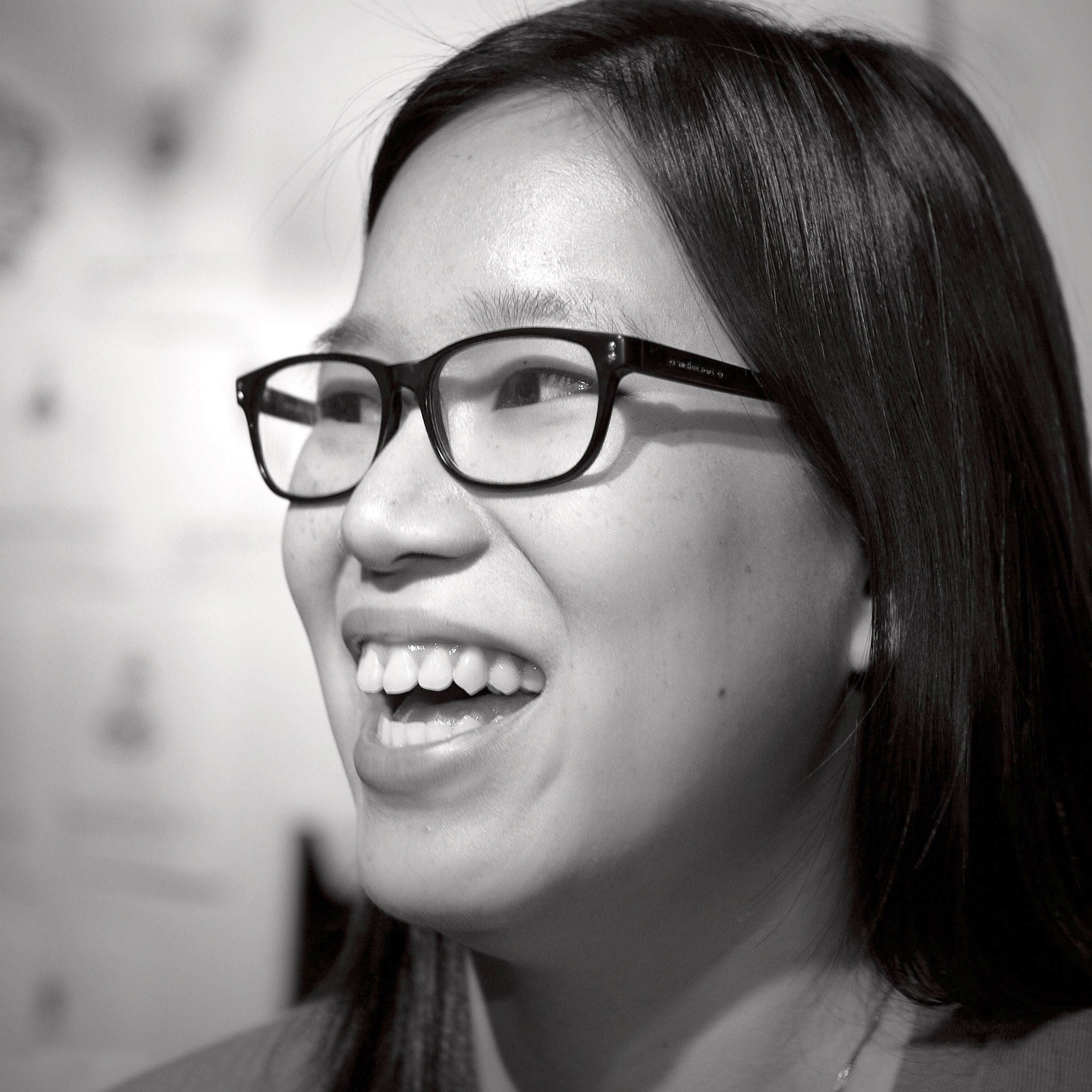
Diana Eng

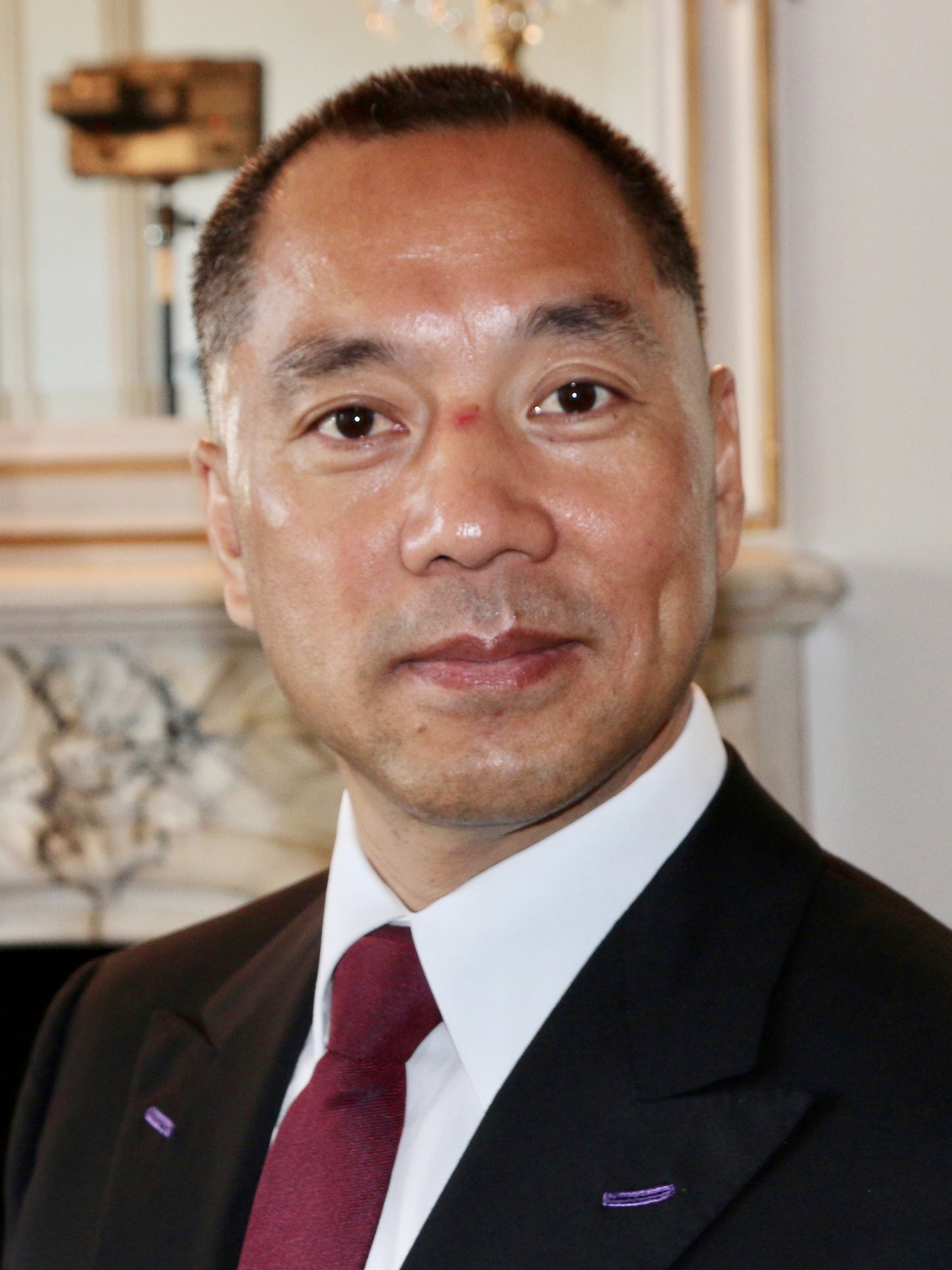
Guo Wengui

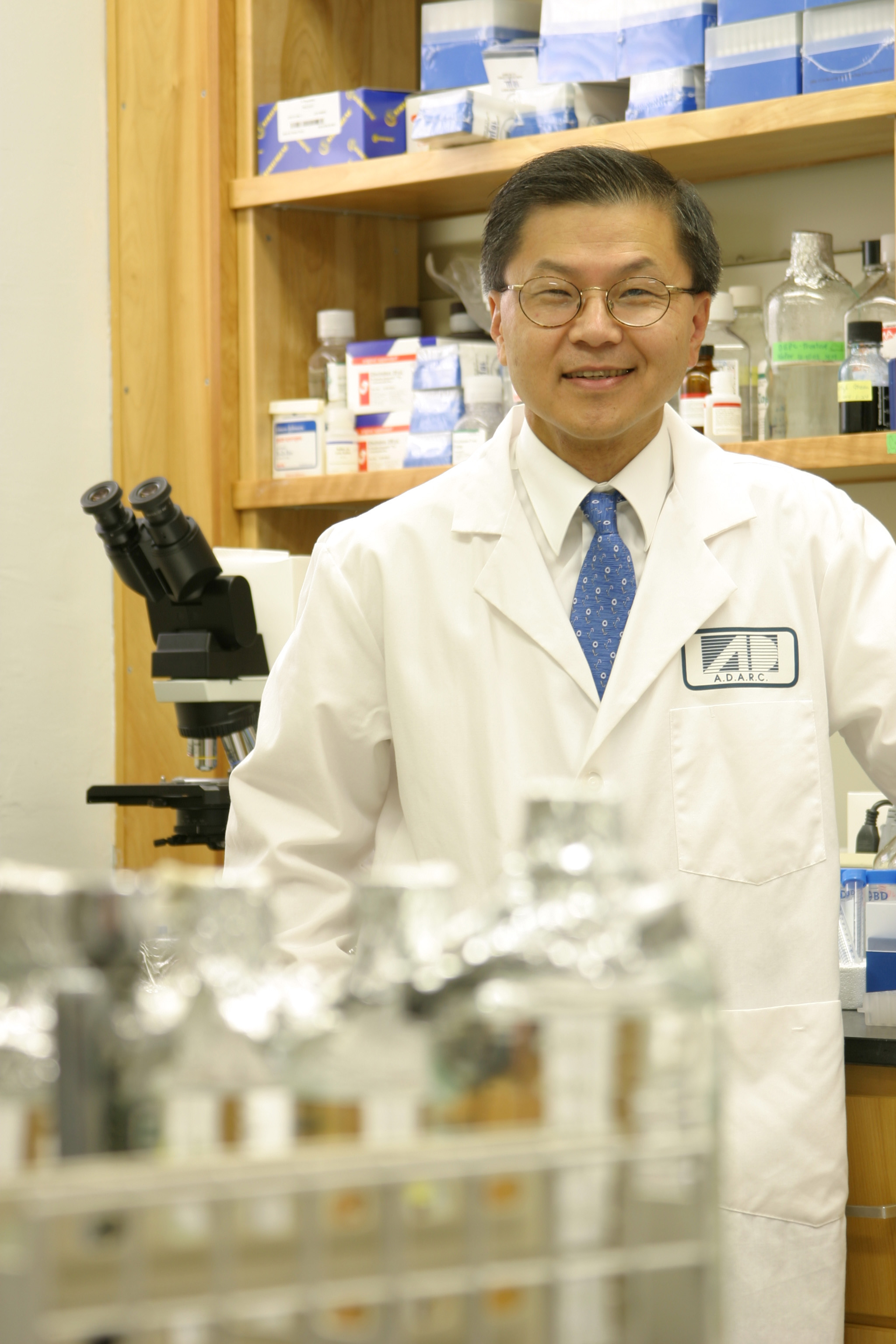
David Ho

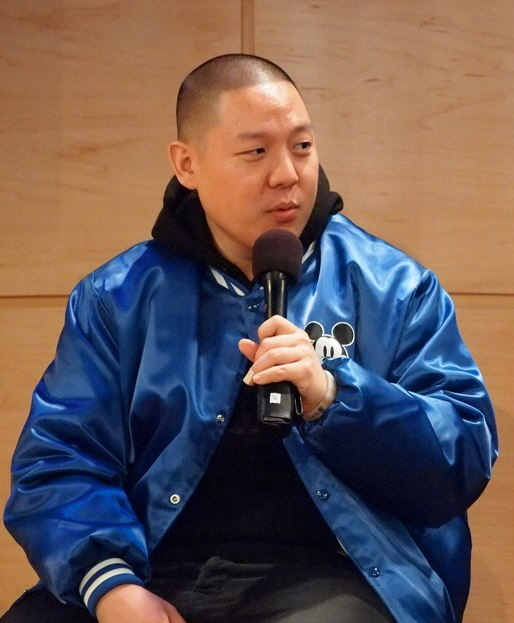
Eddie Huang

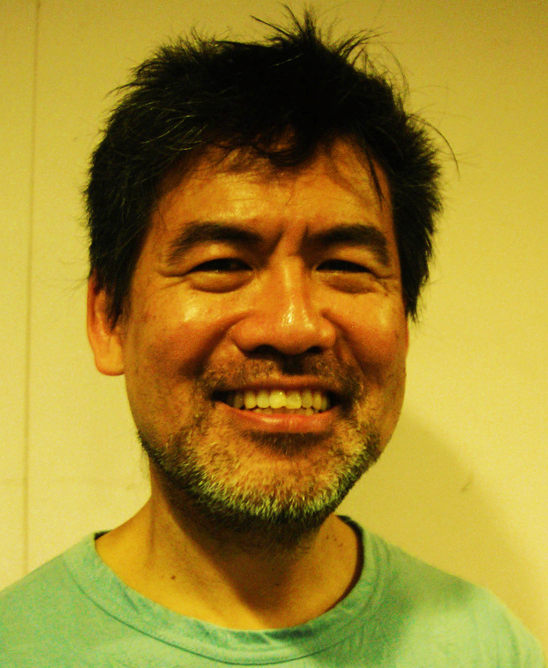
David Henry Hwang

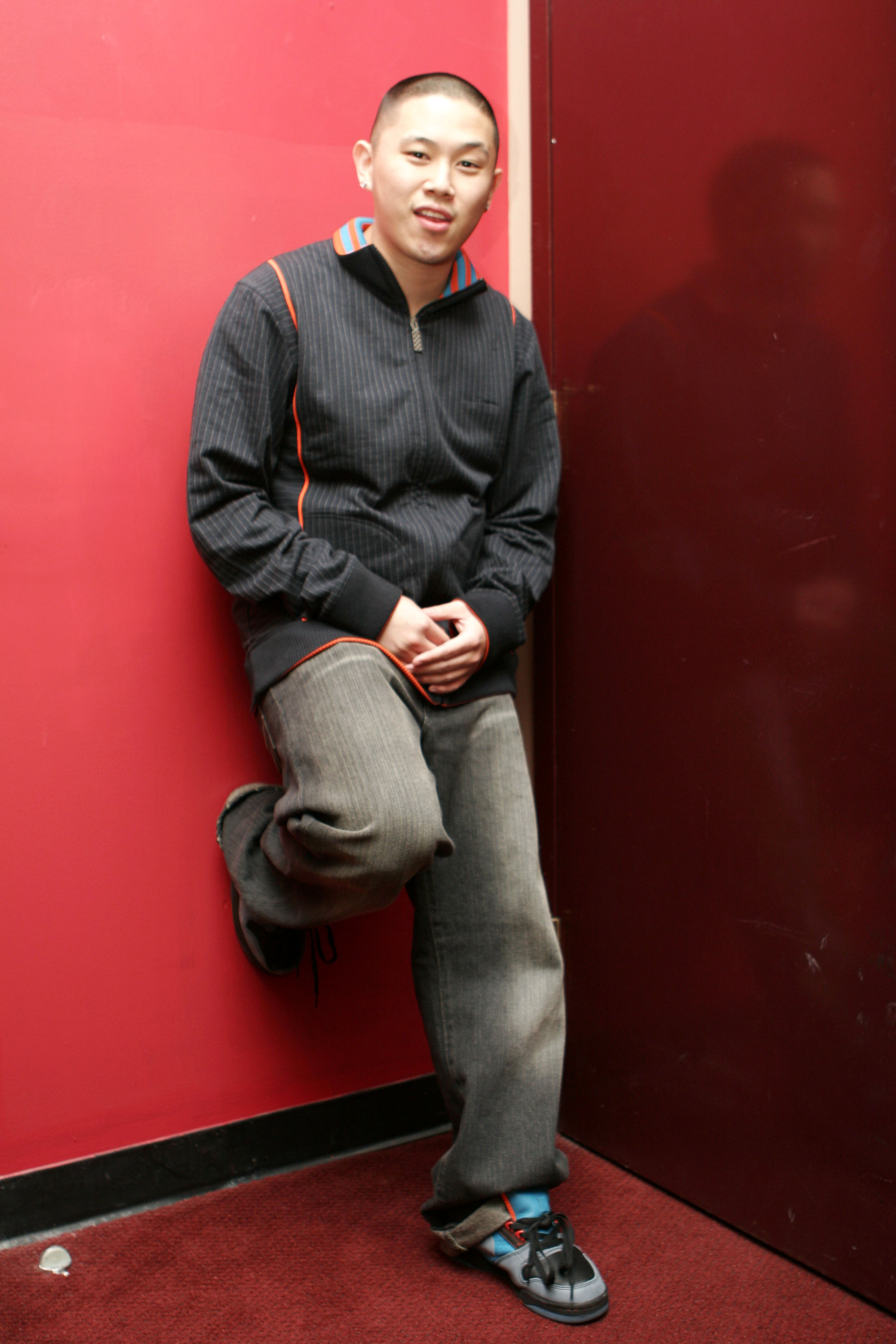
MC Jin

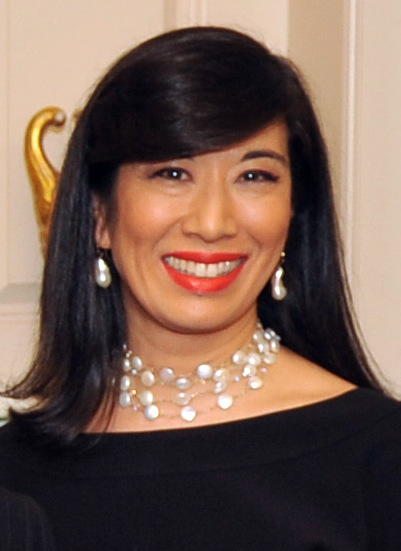
Andrea Jung

Peter Koo

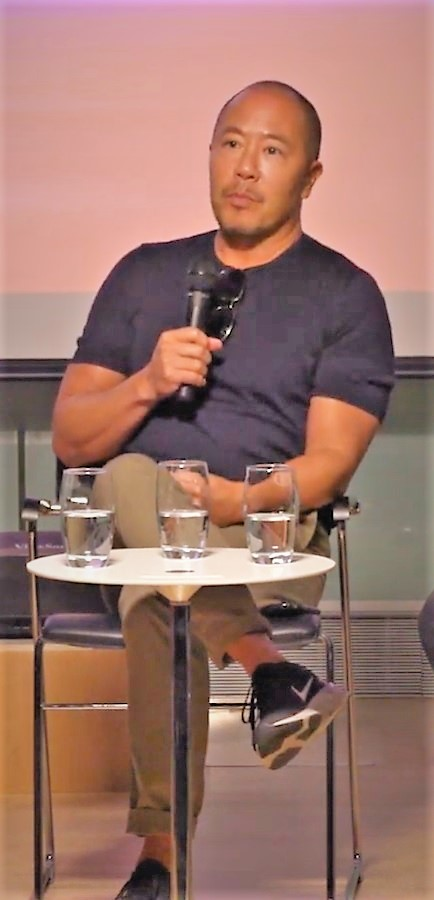
Derek Lam

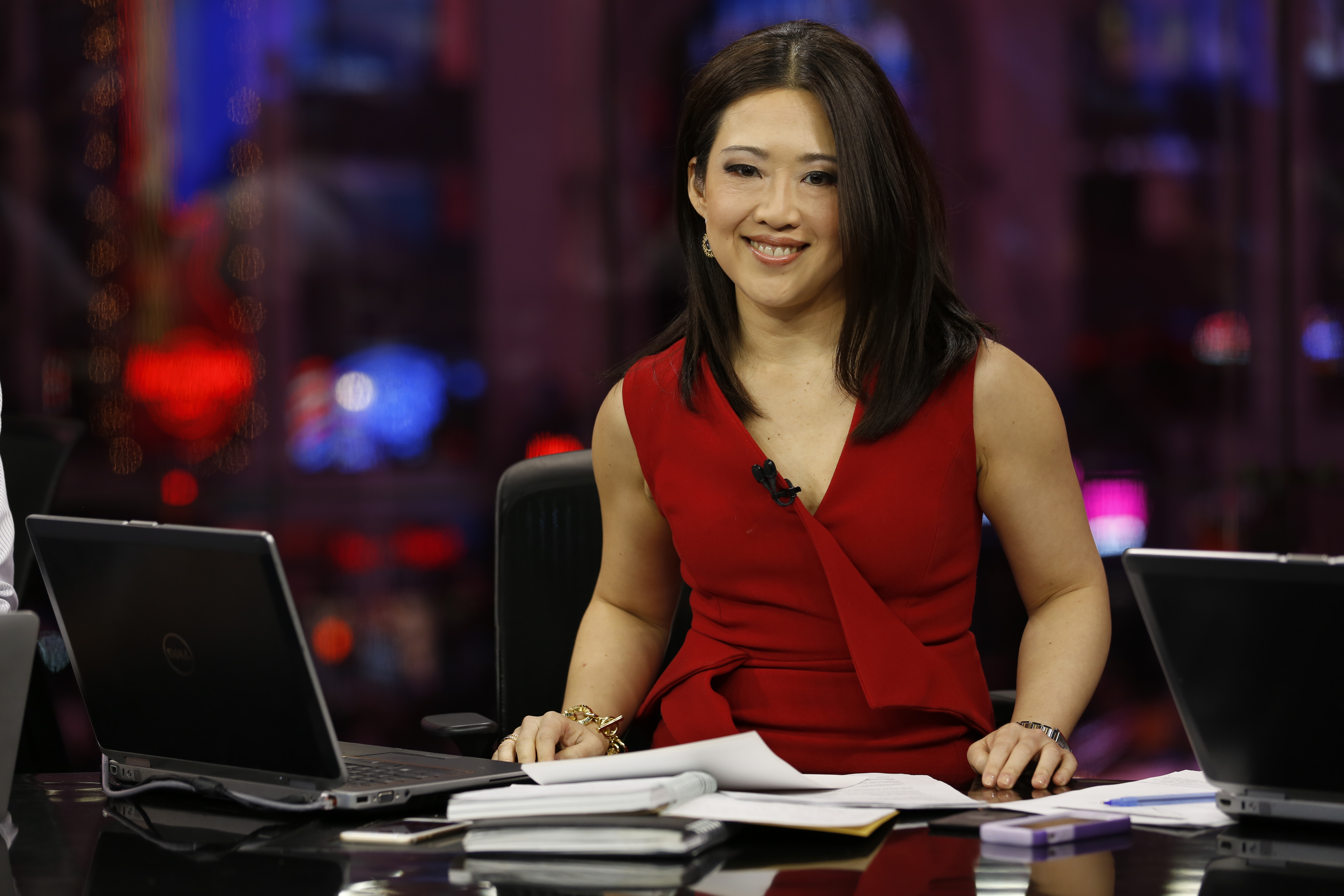
Melissa Lee

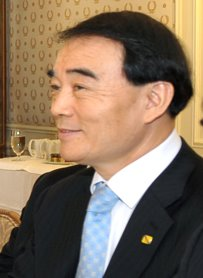
Li Baodong

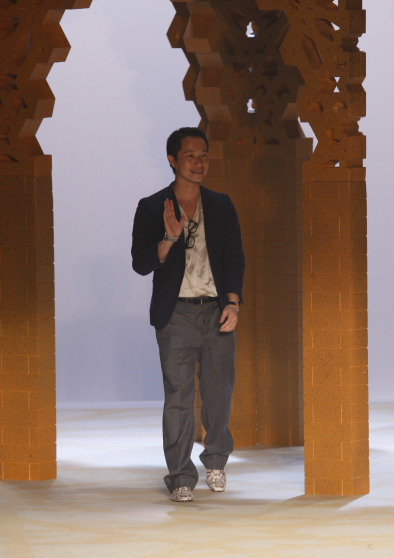
Phillip Lim

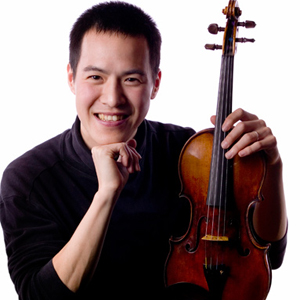
Joseph Lin

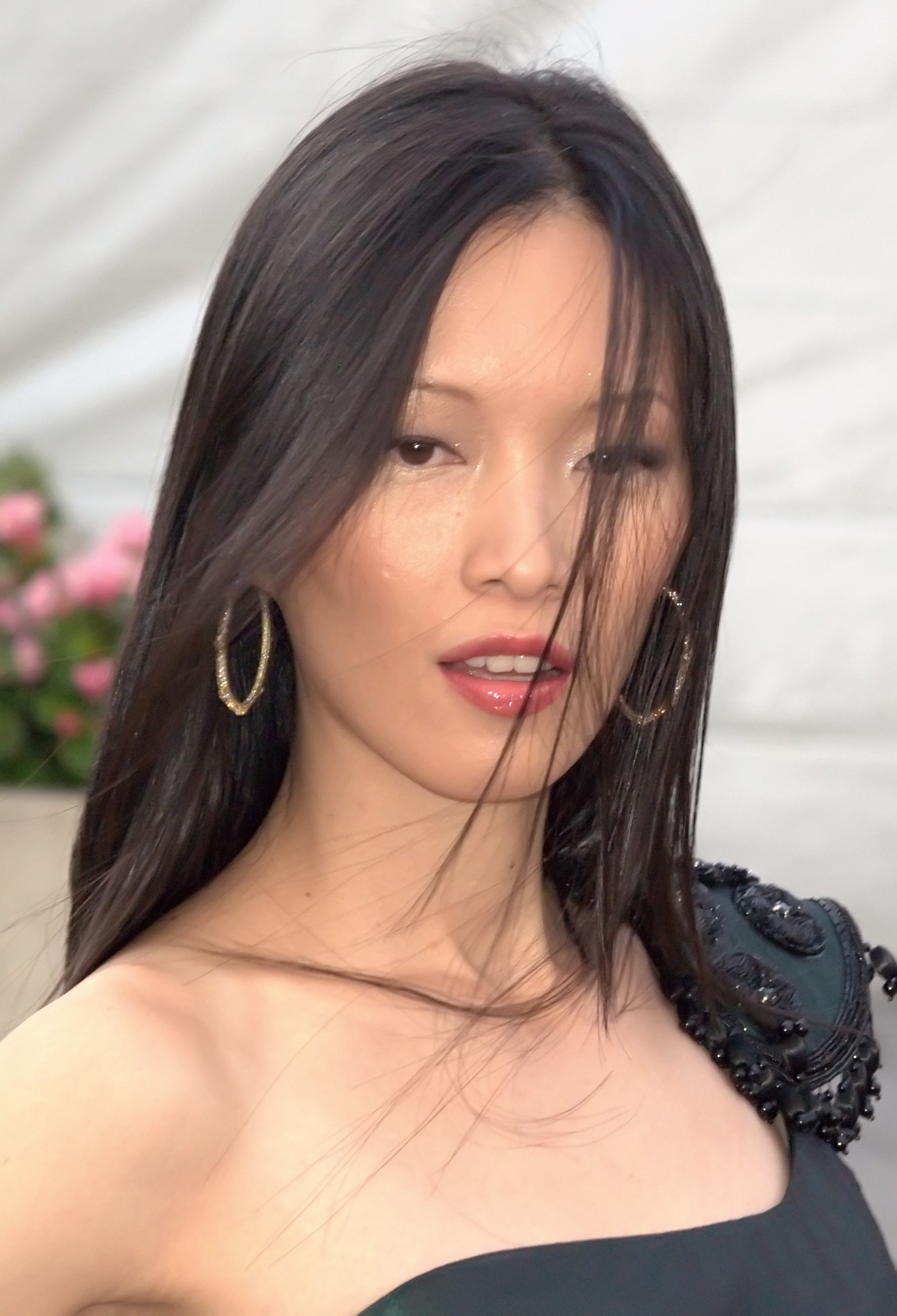
Ling Tan

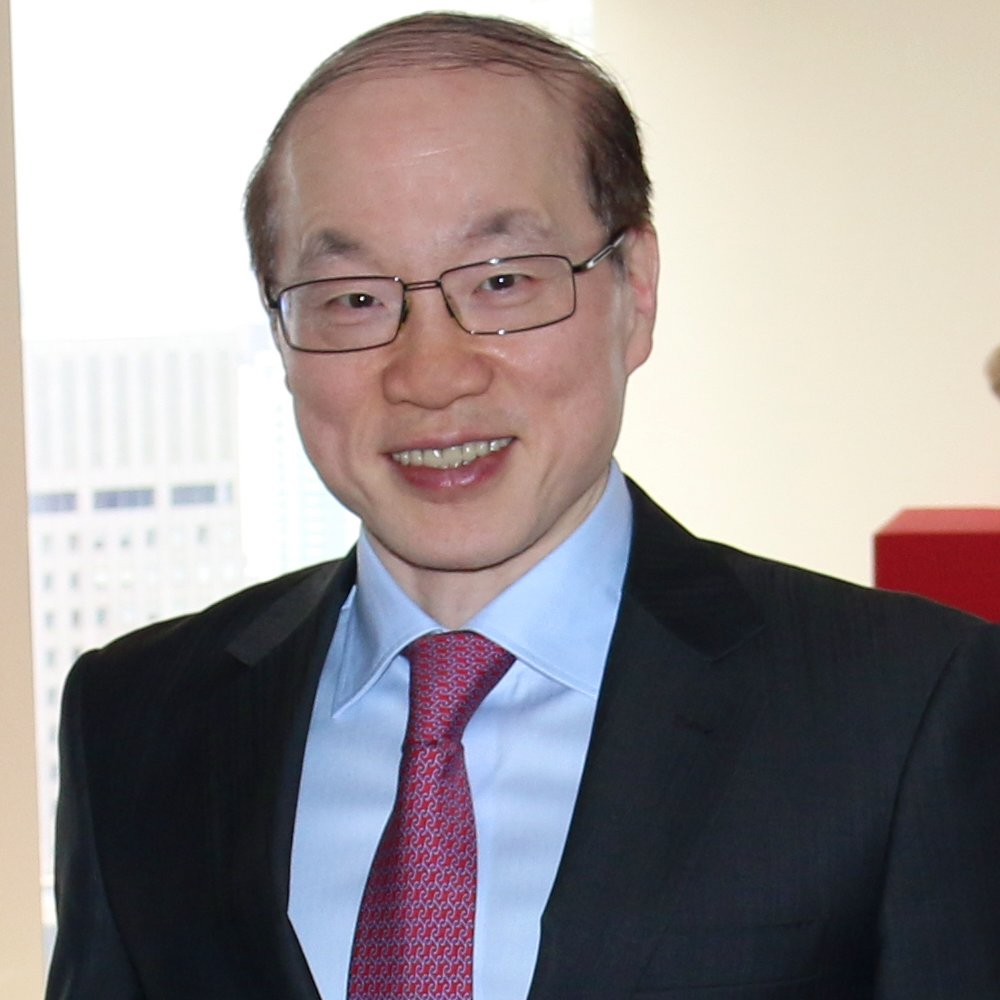
Liu Jieyi

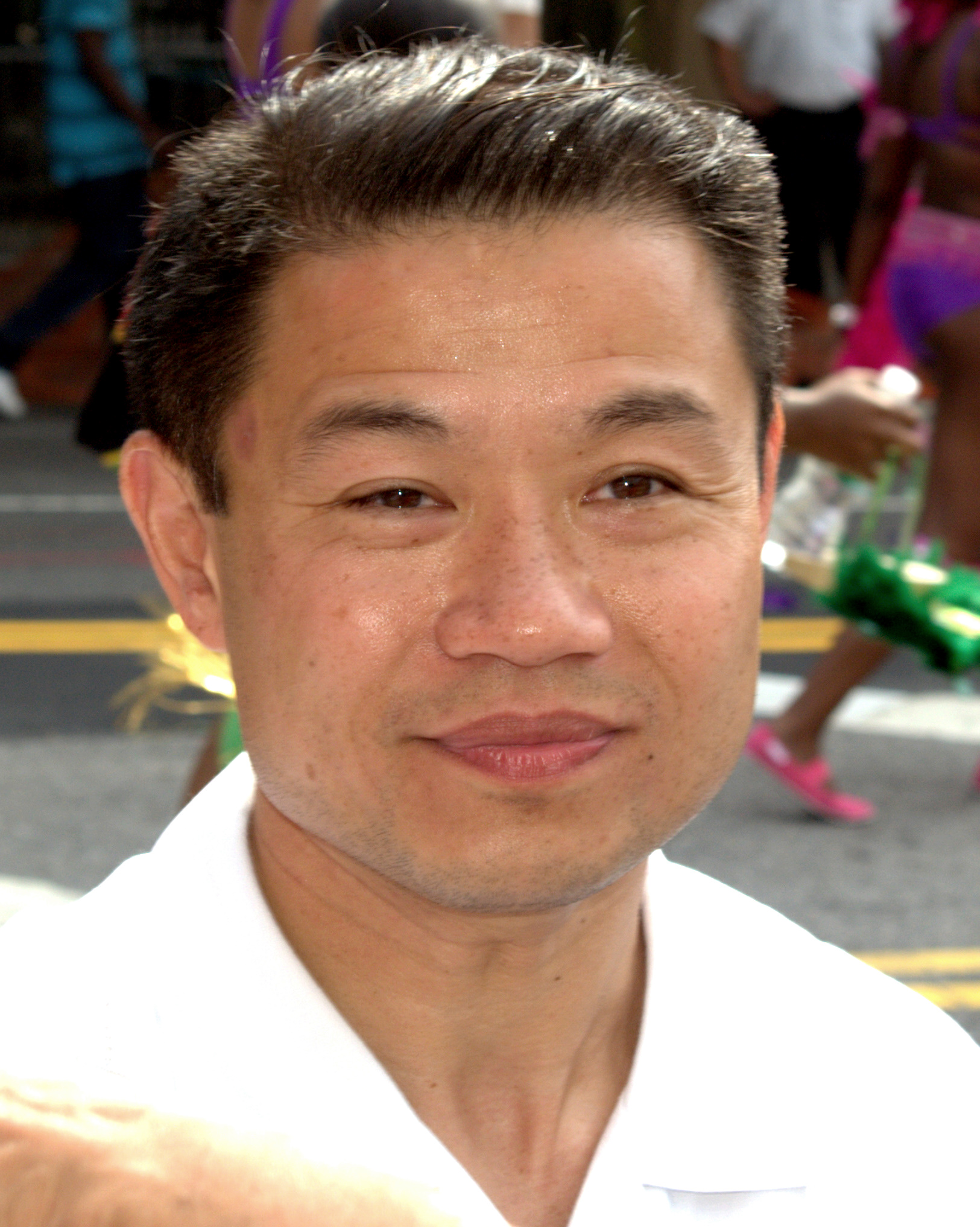
John Liu

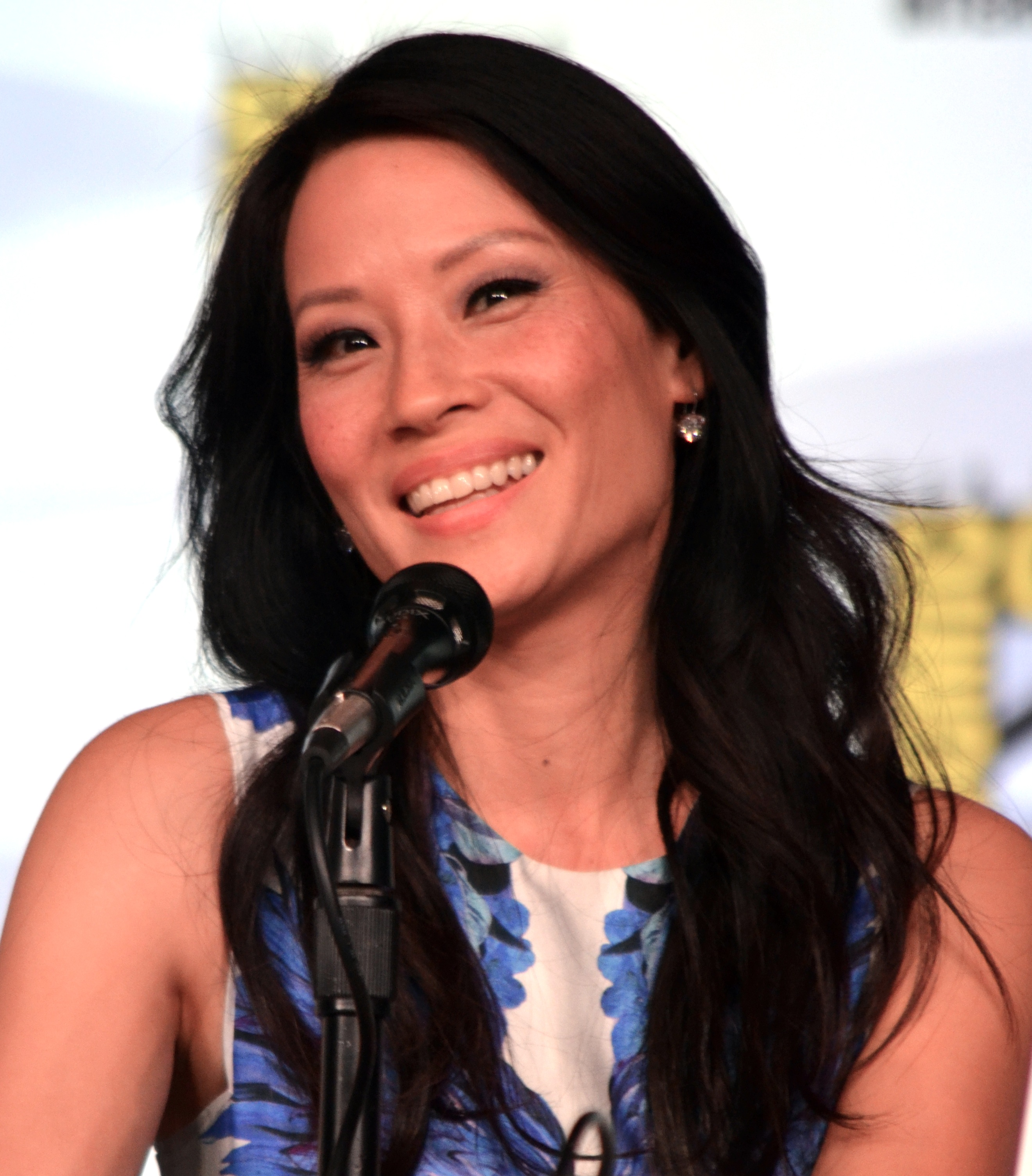
Lucy Liu

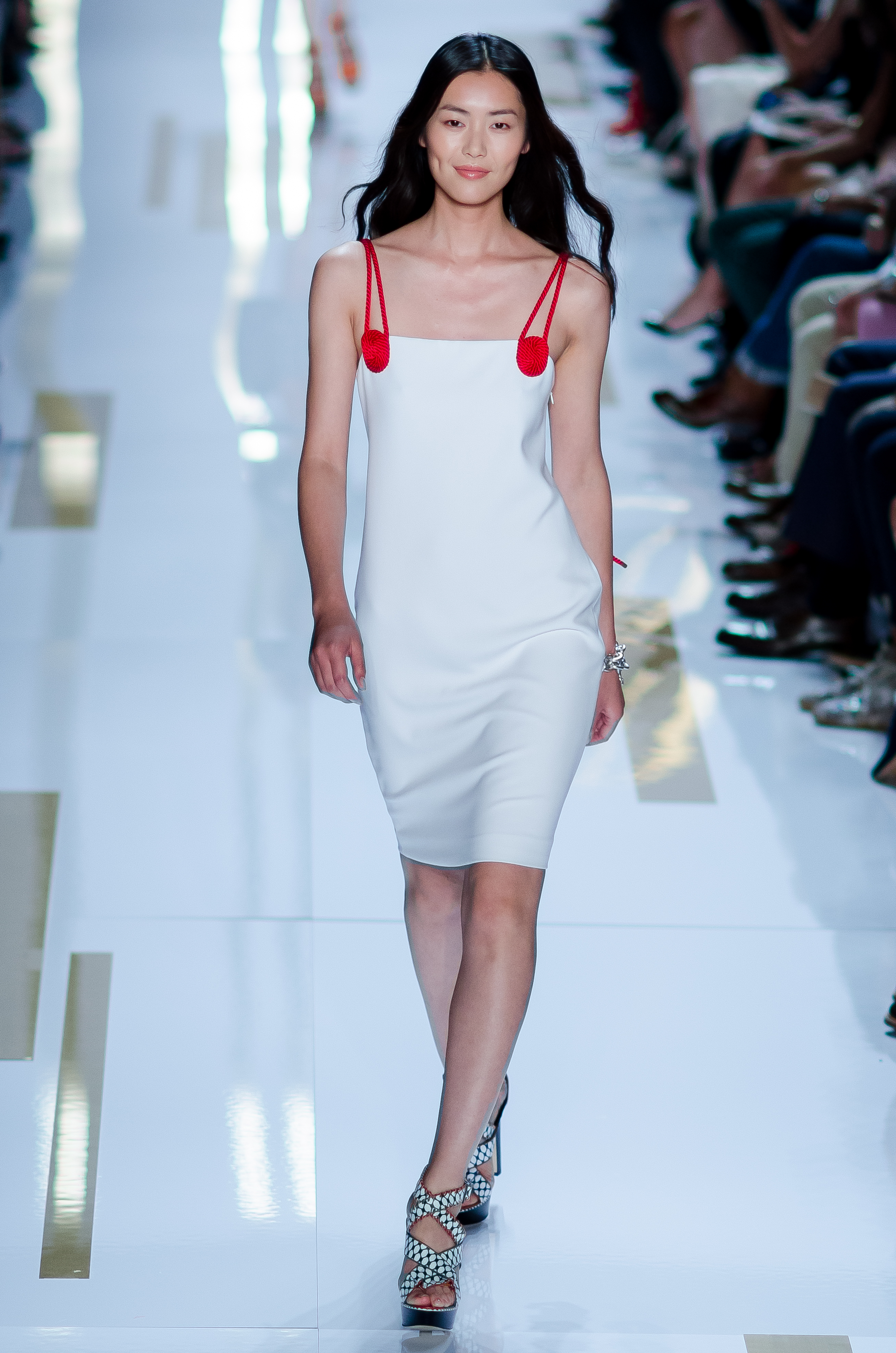
Liu Wen

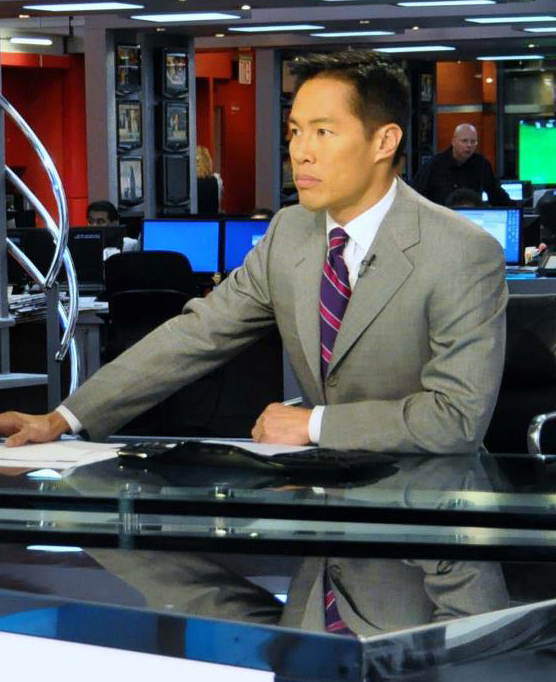
Richard Lui

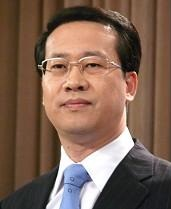
Ma Zhaoxu

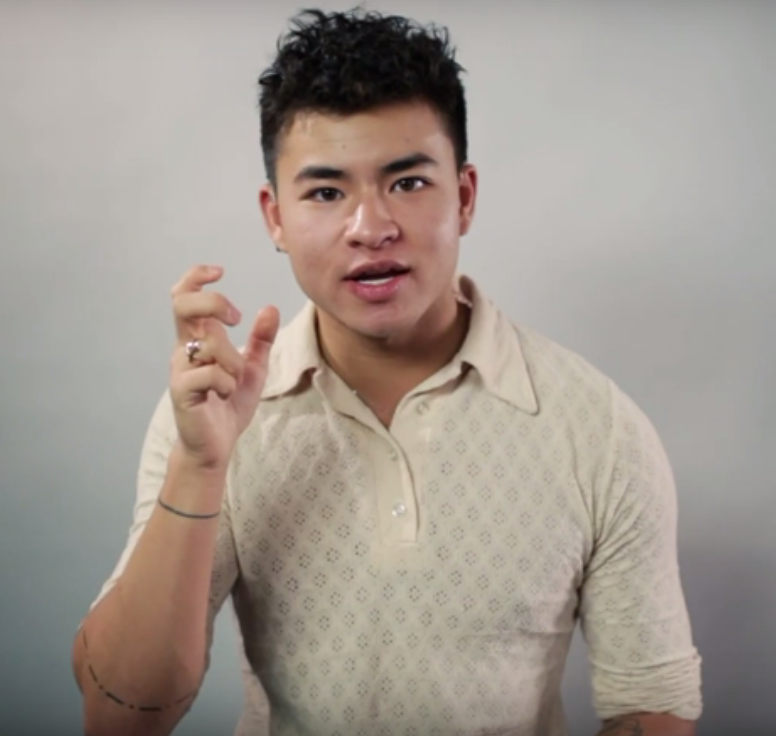
Chella Man

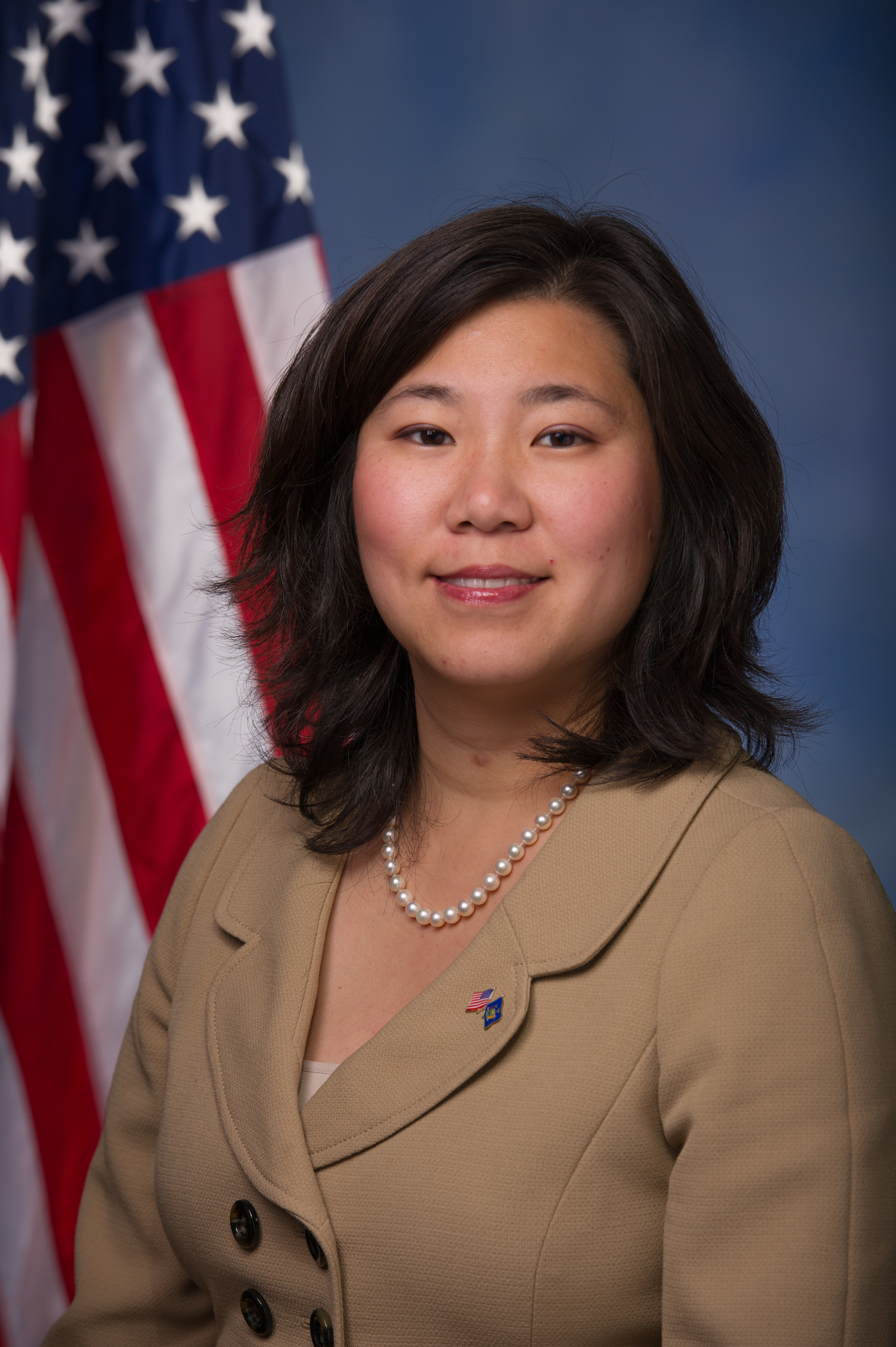
Grace Meng

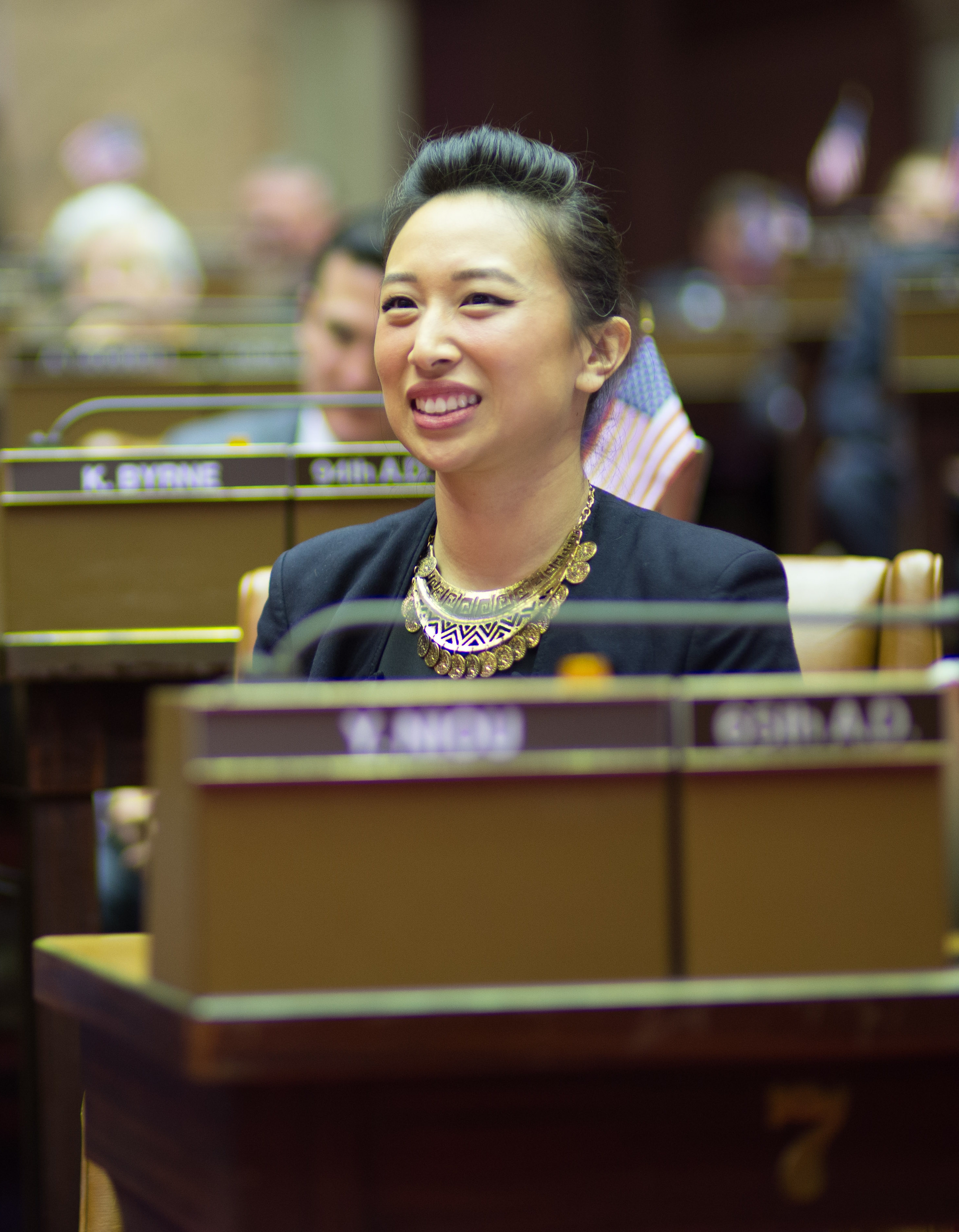
Yuh-Line Niou

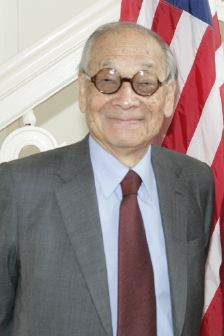
I.M. Pei

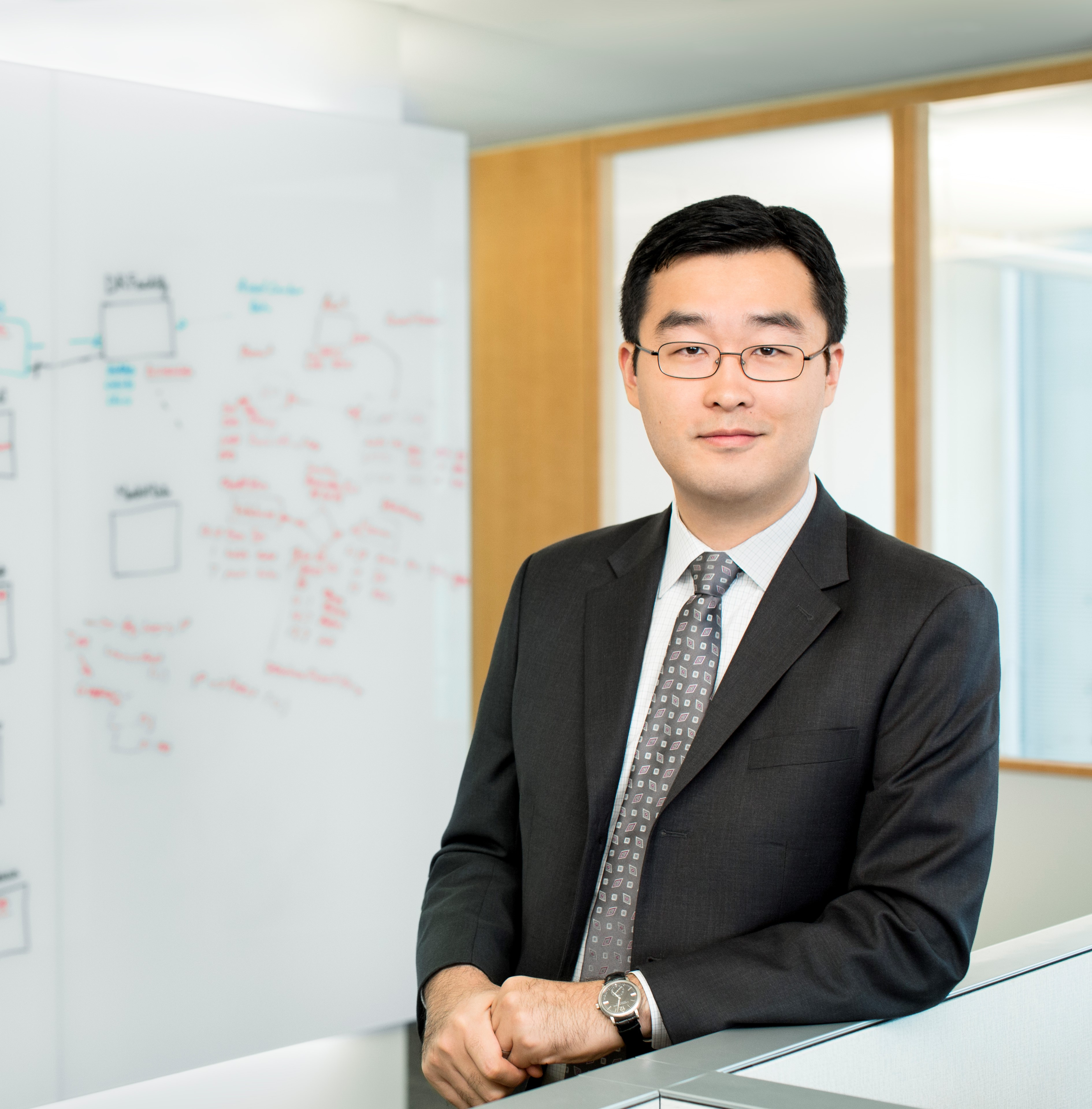
Peng Zhao

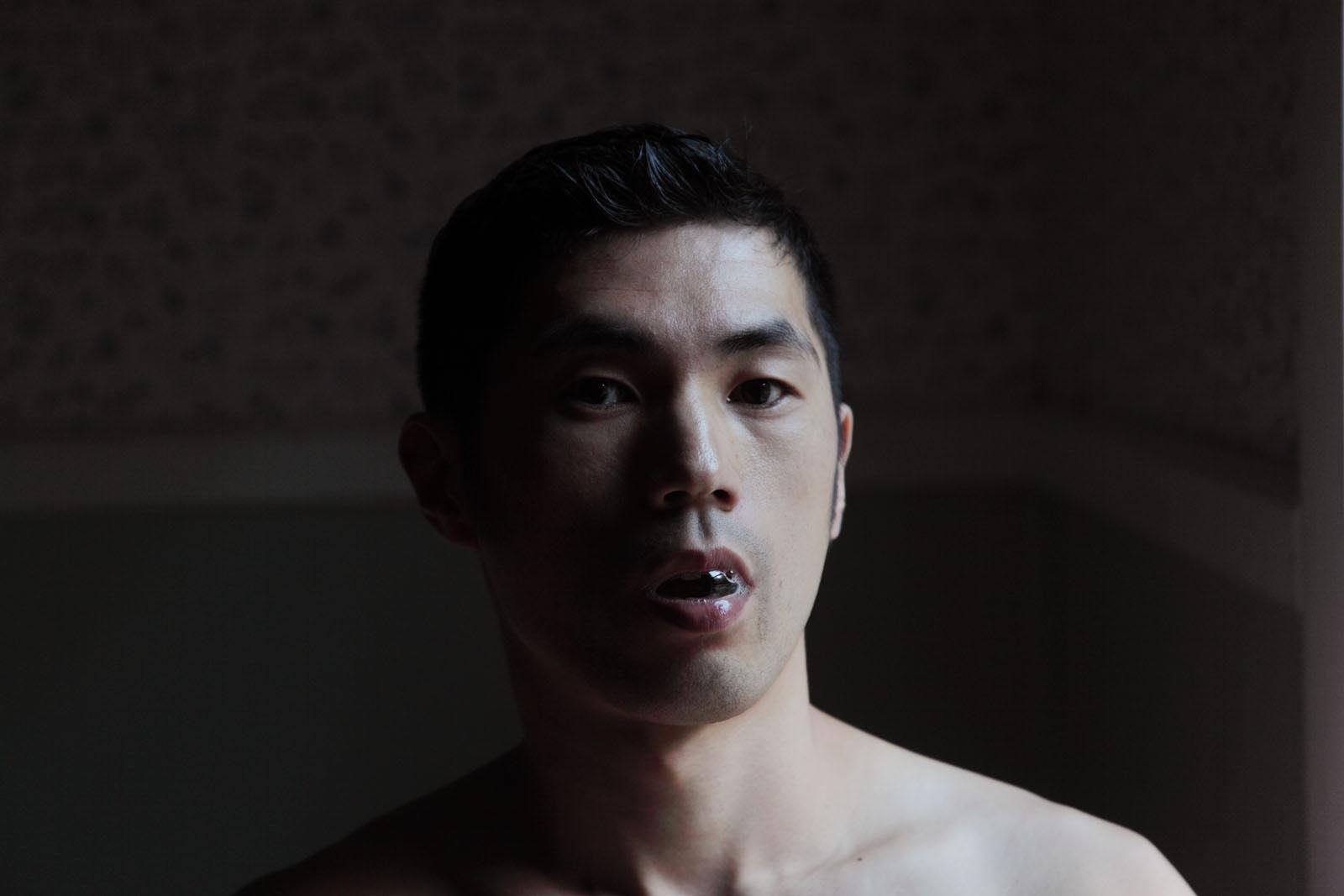
Shen Wei

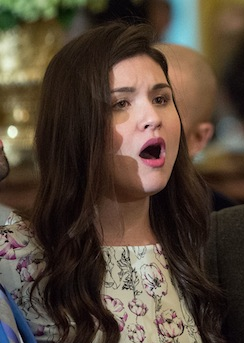
Phillipa Soo

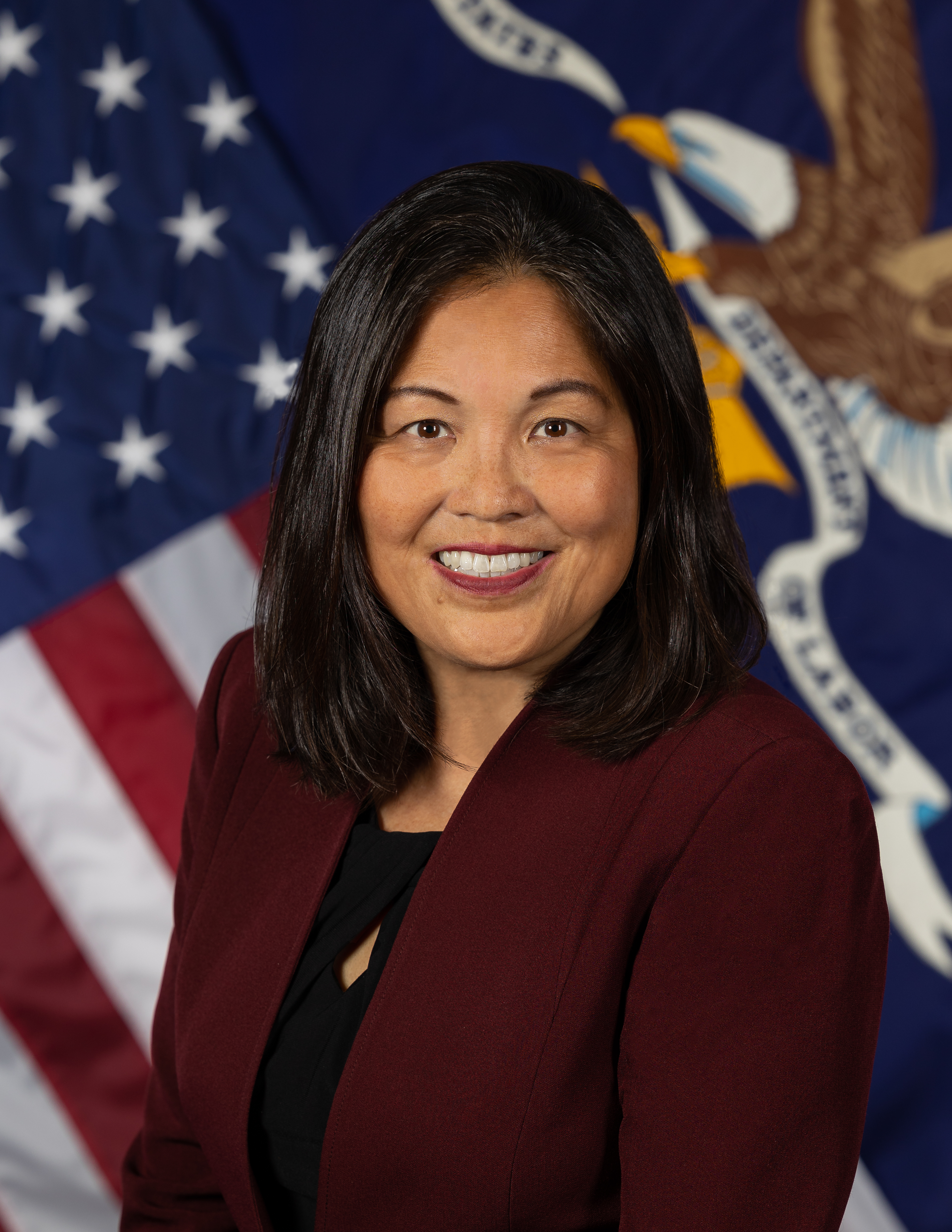
Julie Su

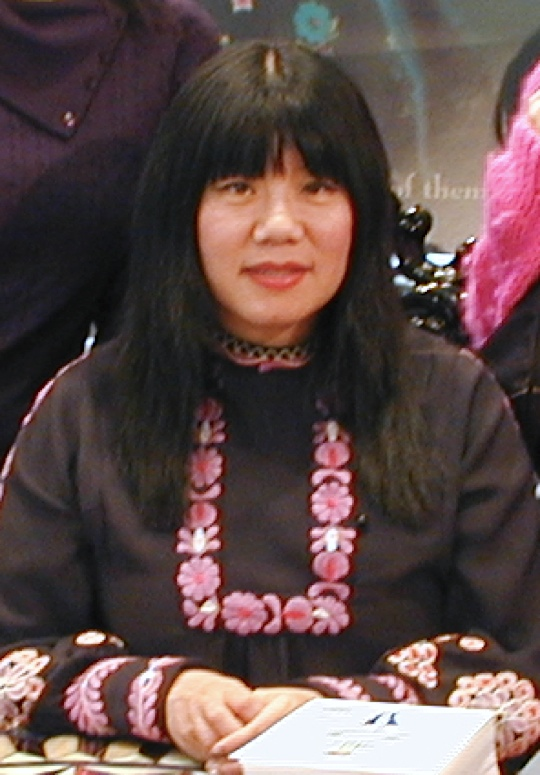
Anna Sui

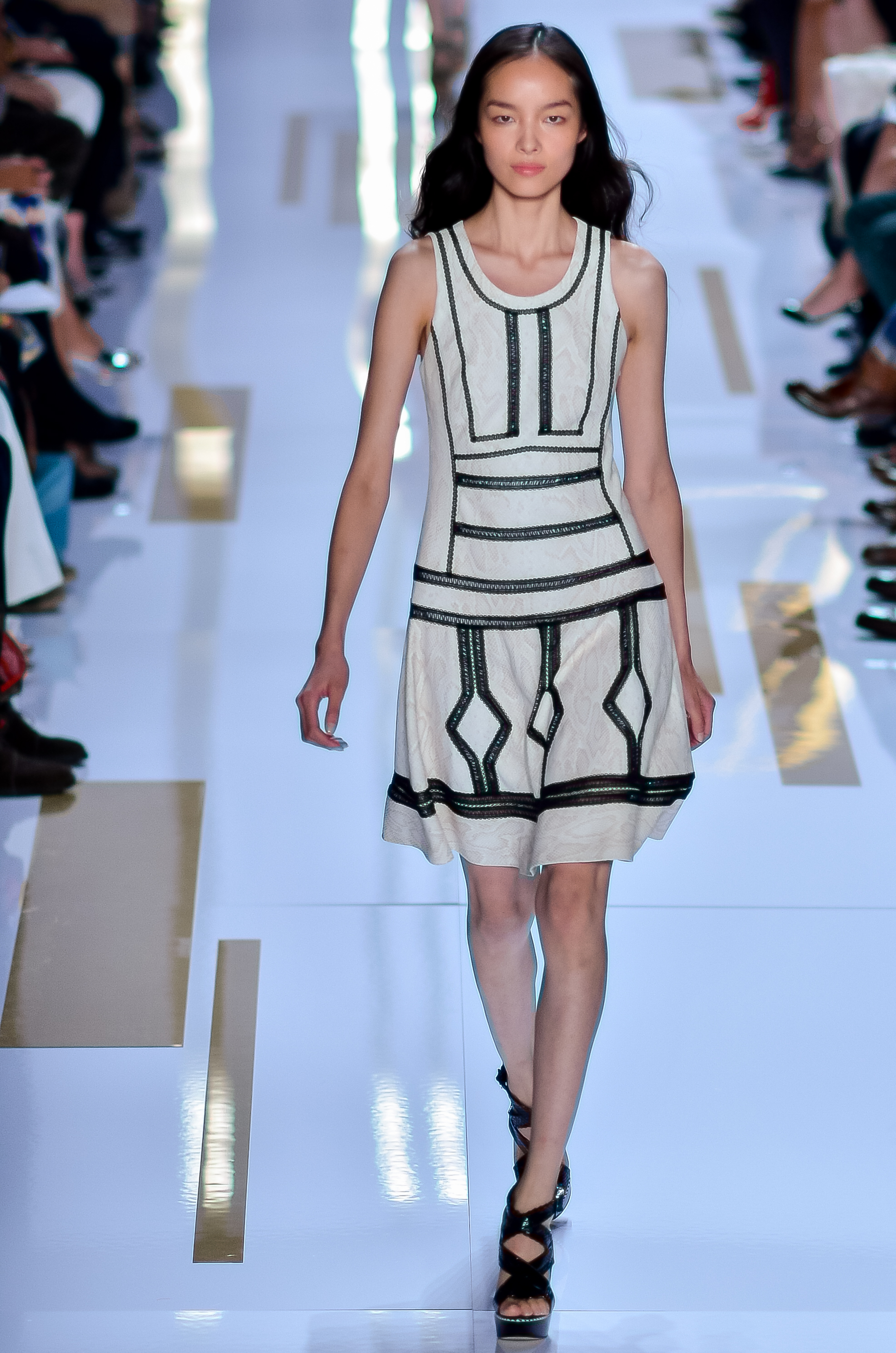
Fei Fei Sun

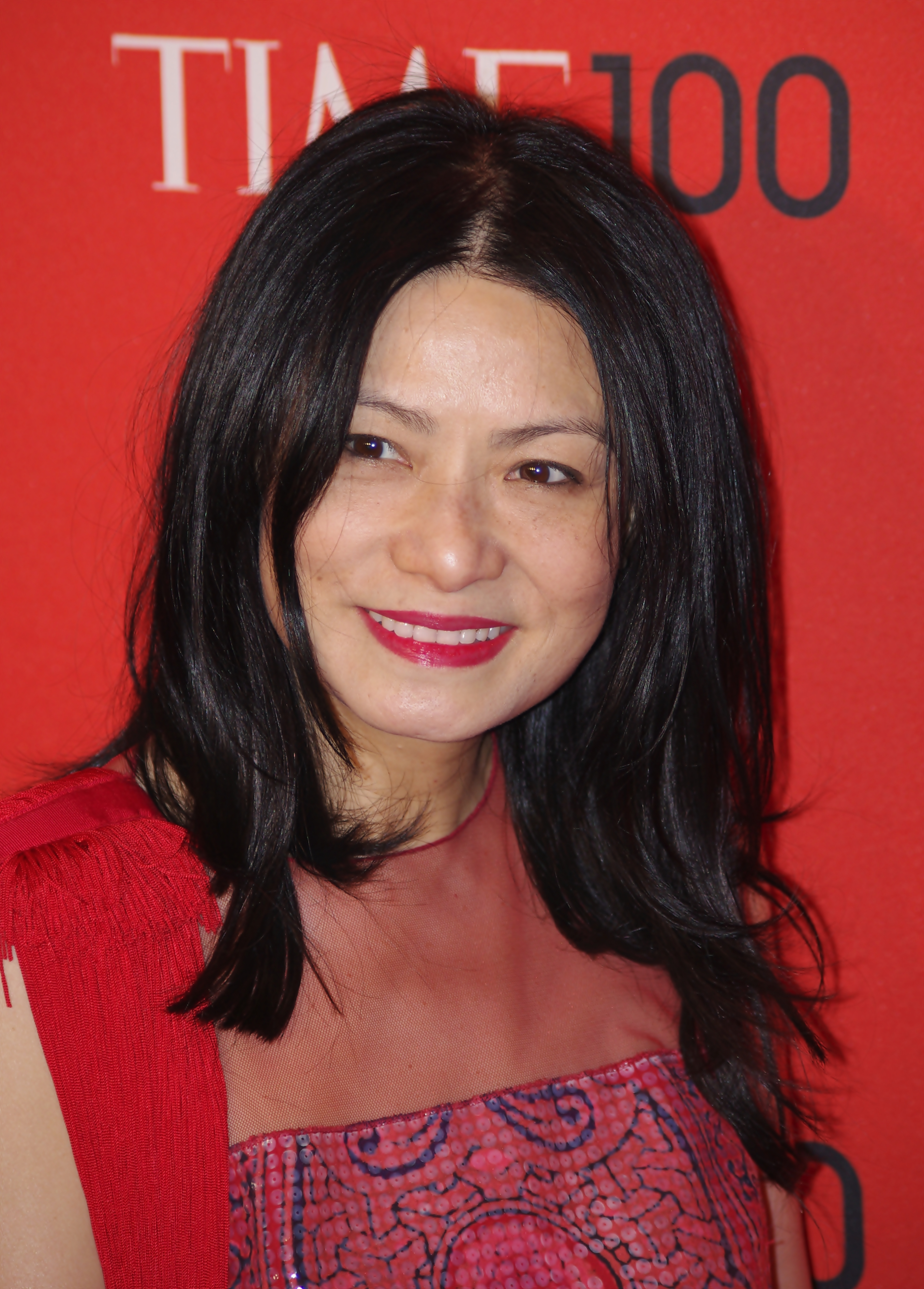
Vivienne Tam

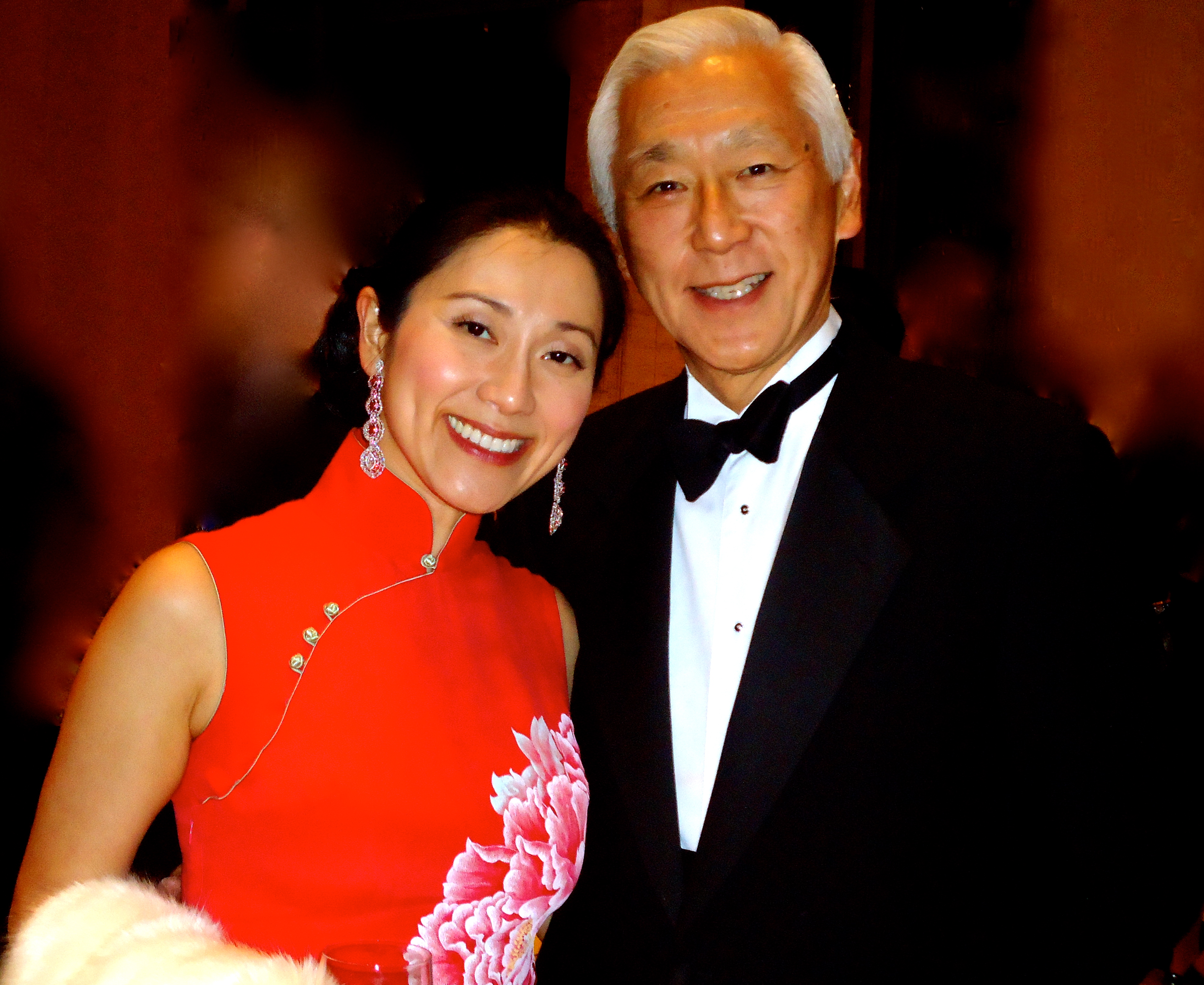
Oscar and Hsin Mei Agnes Hsu Tang

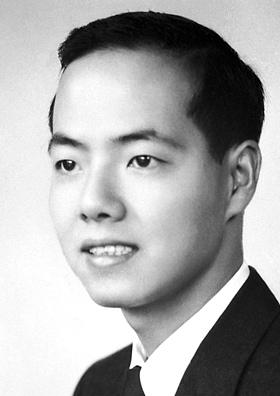
Tsung-Dao Lee

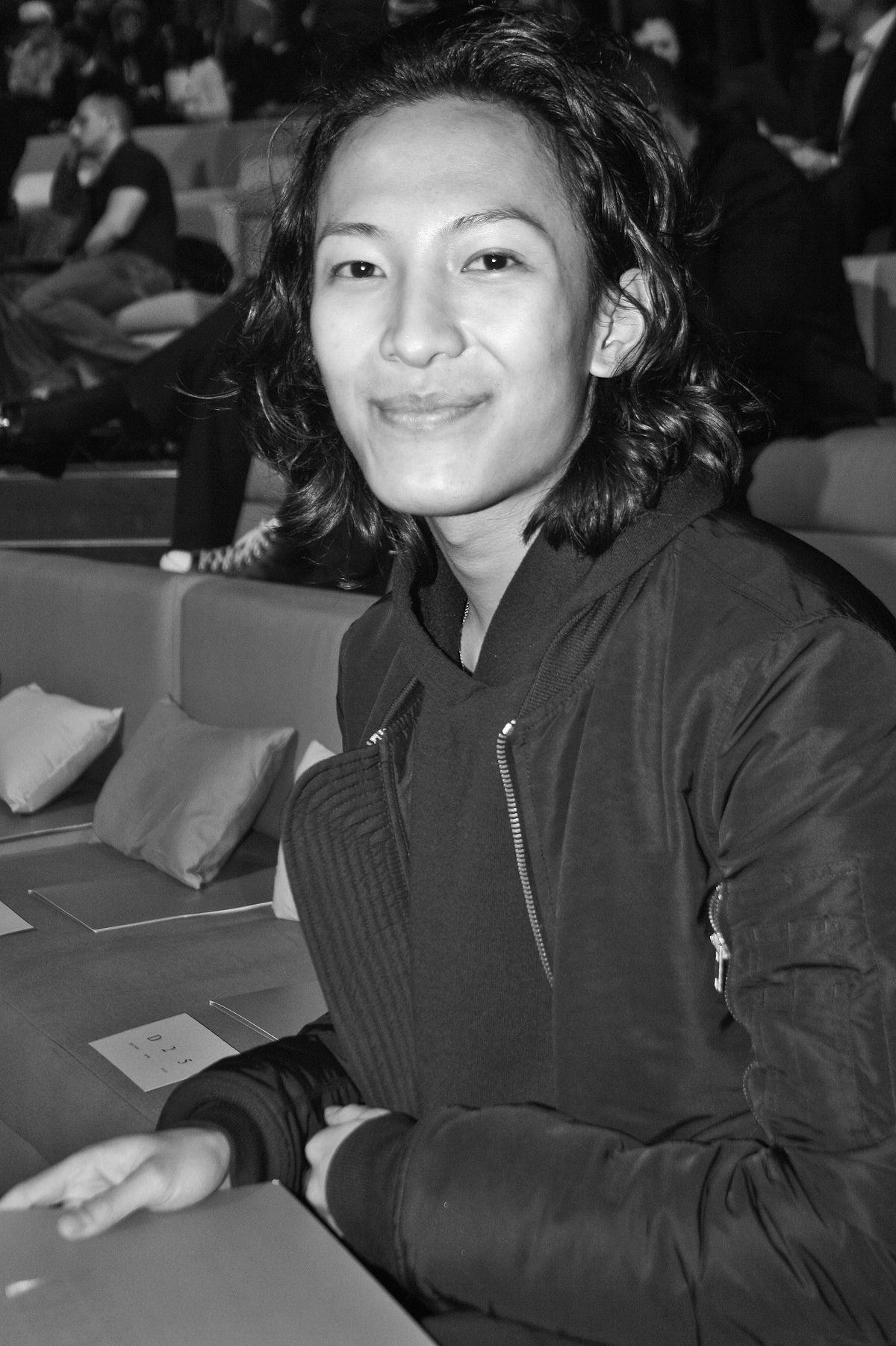
Alexander Wang

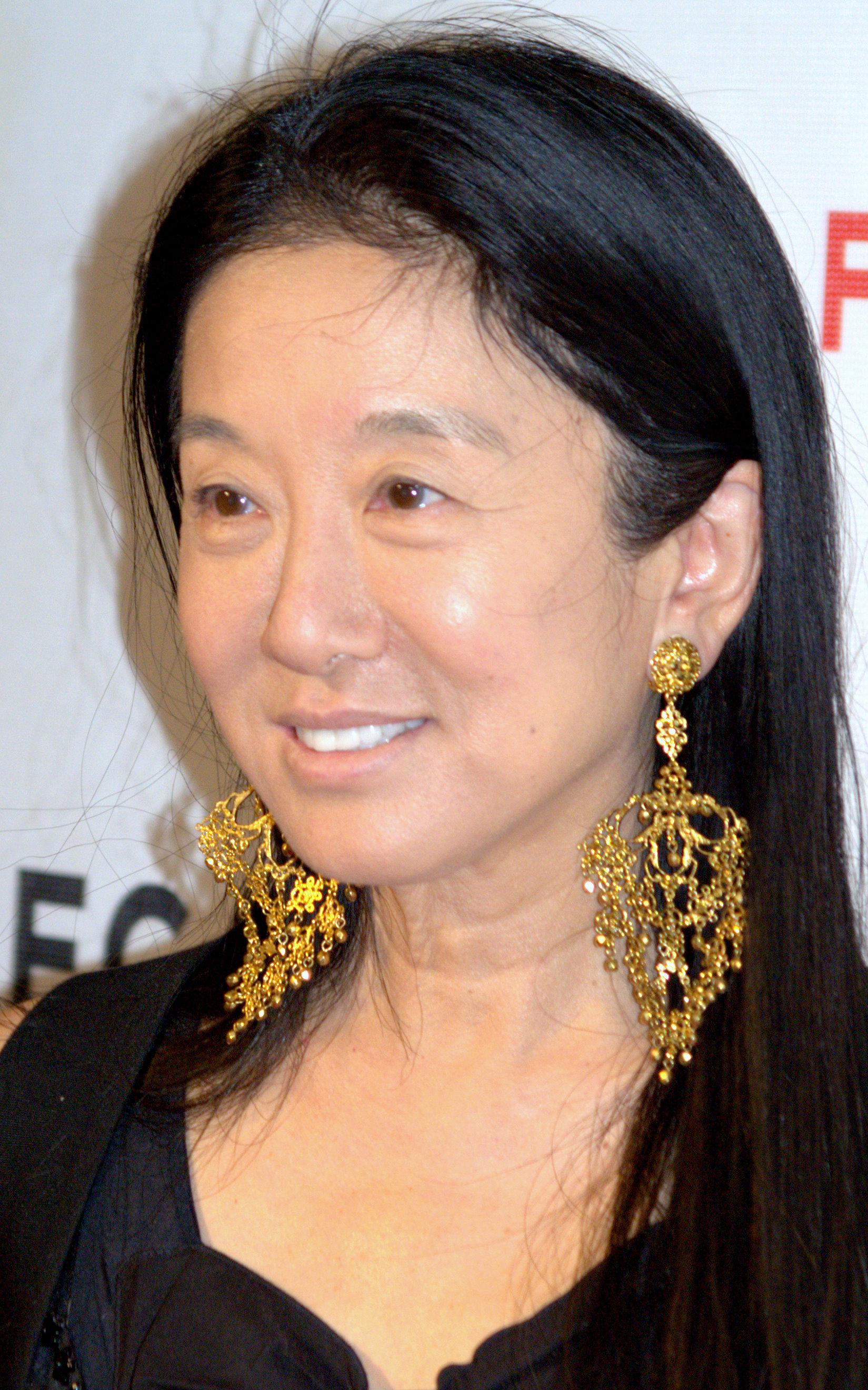
Vera Wang

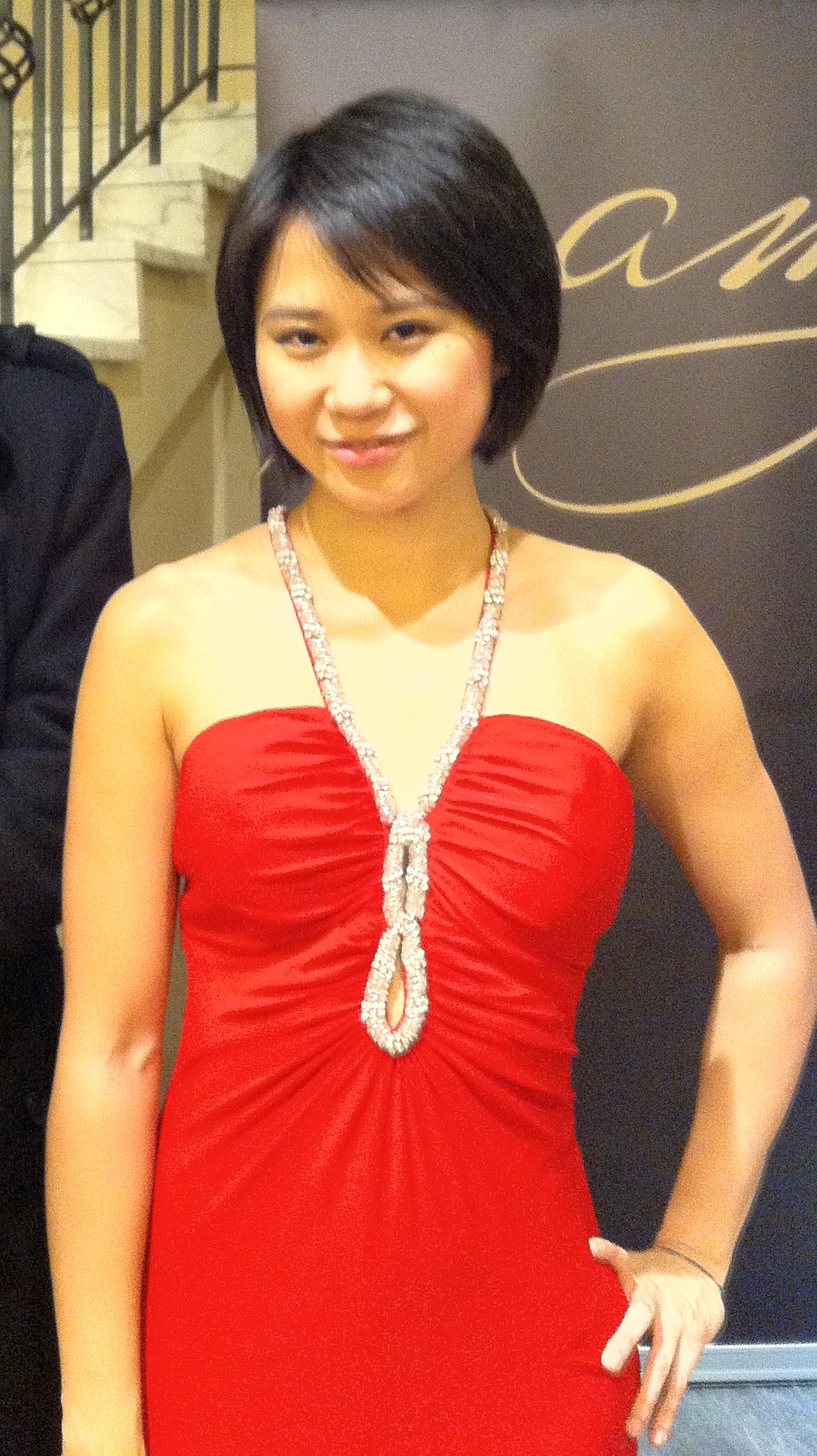
Yuja Wang

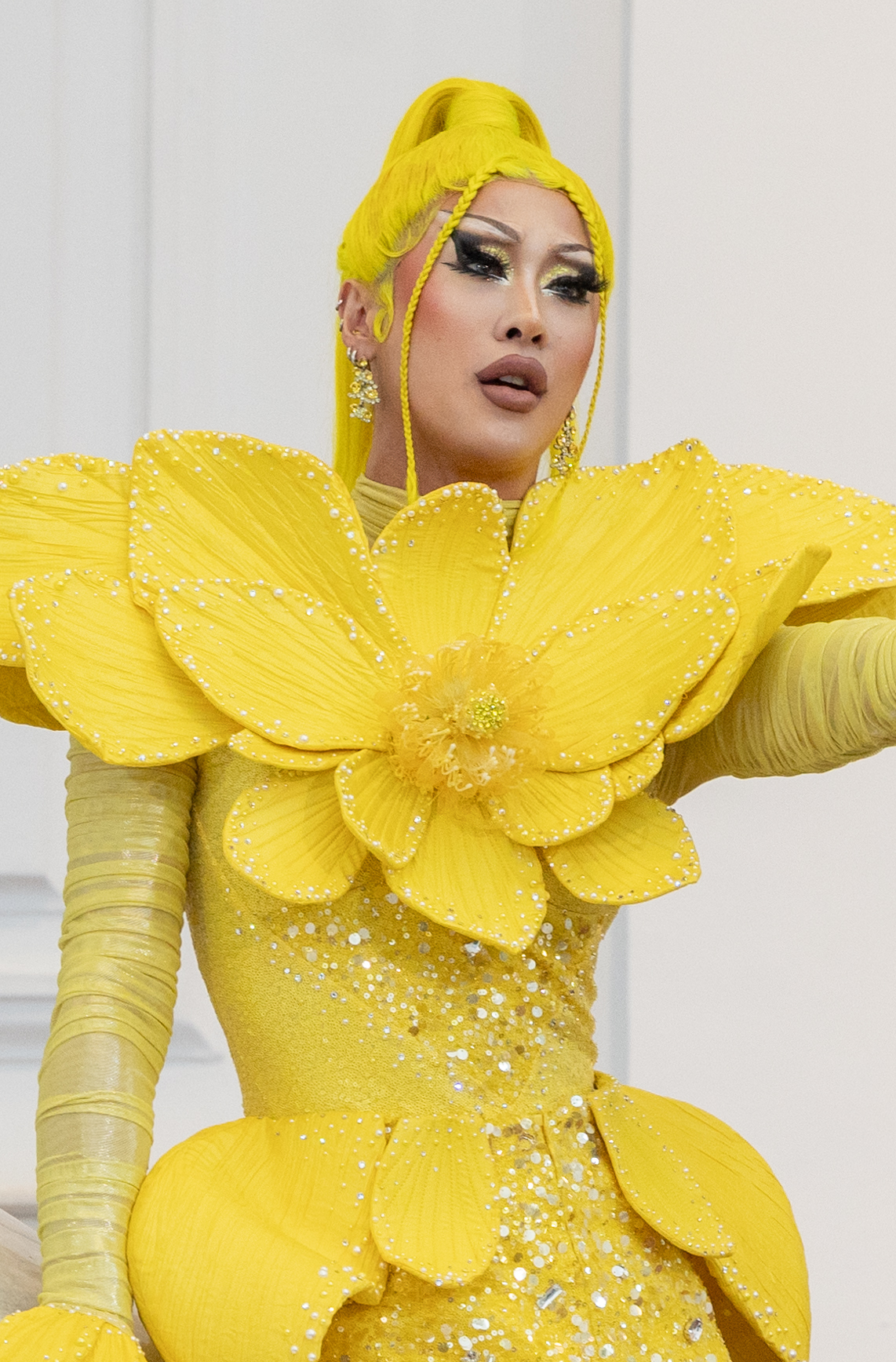
Nymphia Wind

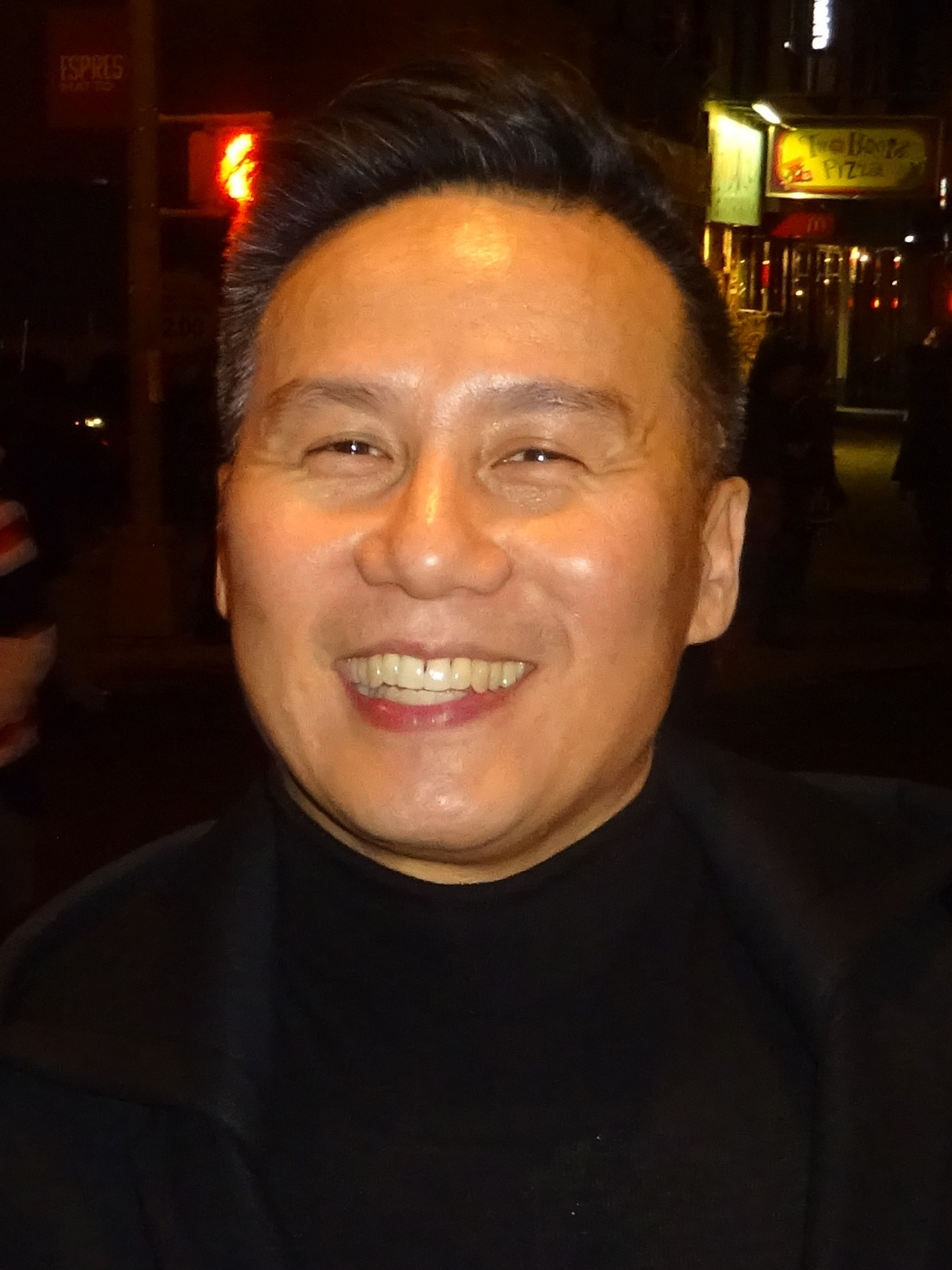
BD Wong

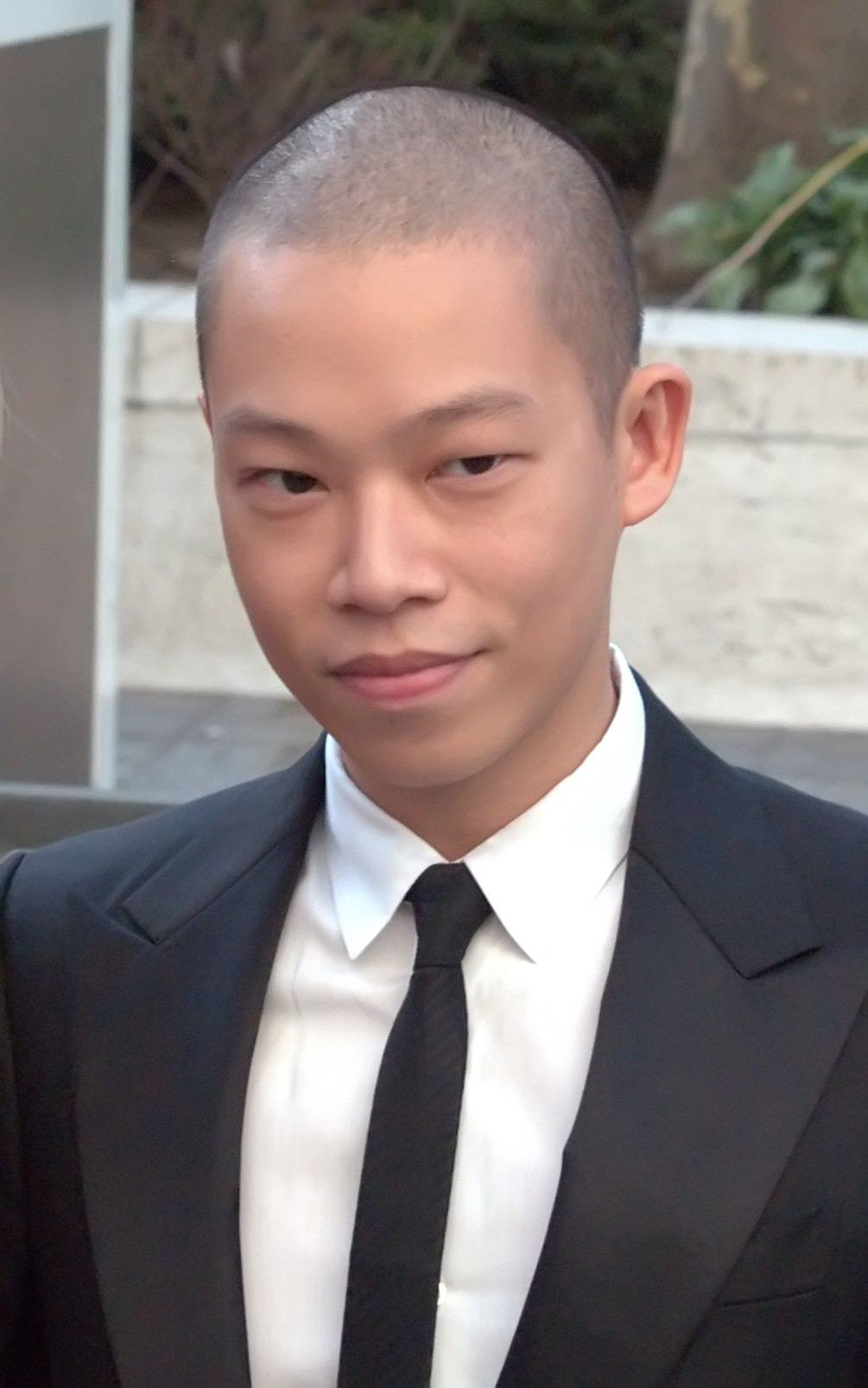
Jason Wu

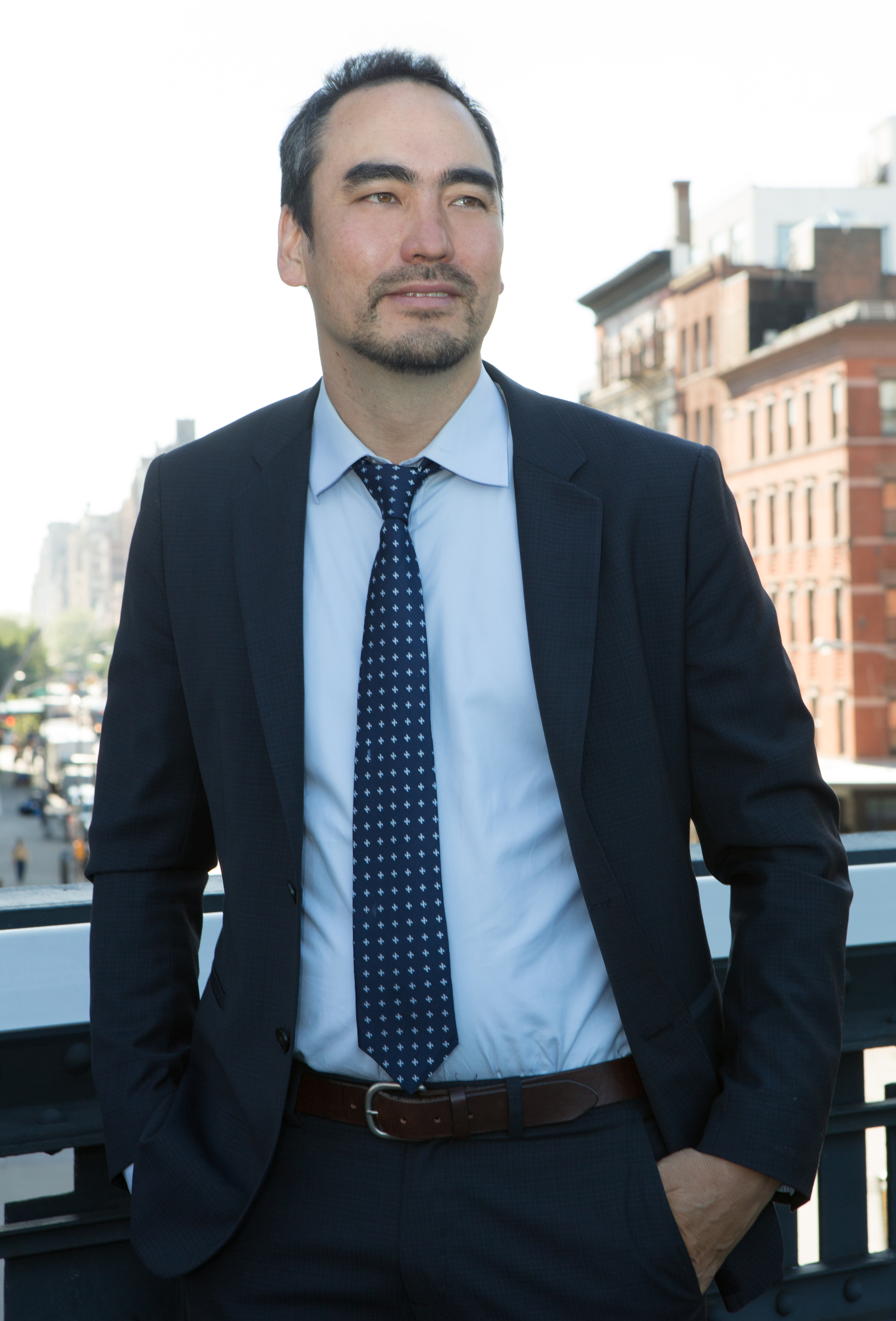
Tim Wu

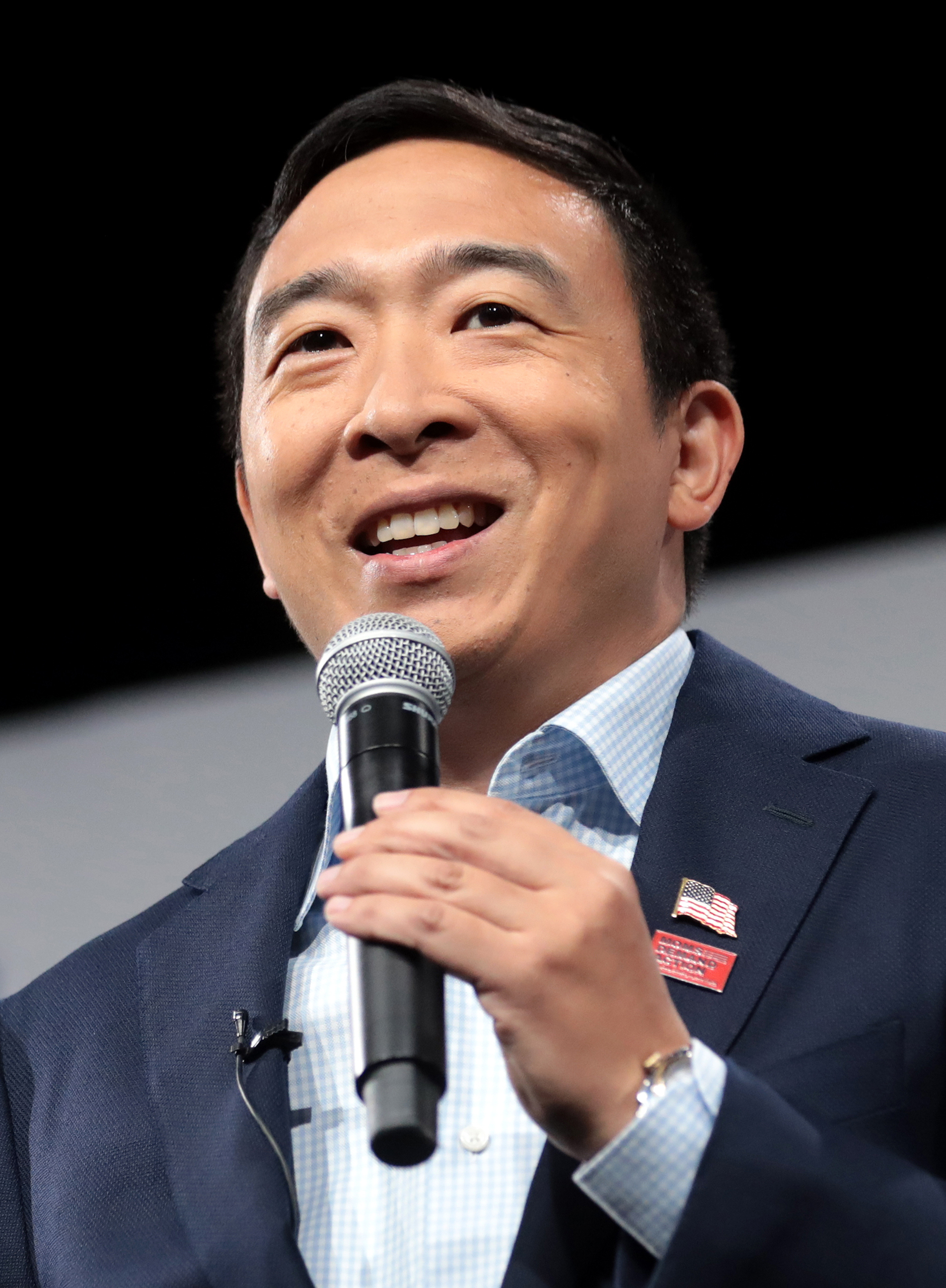
Andrew Yang

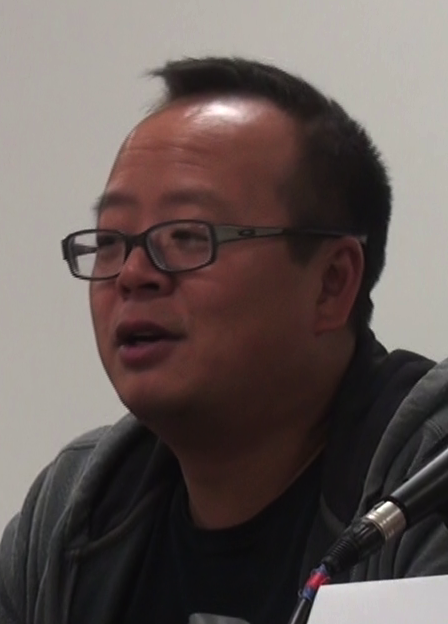
Jeff Yang

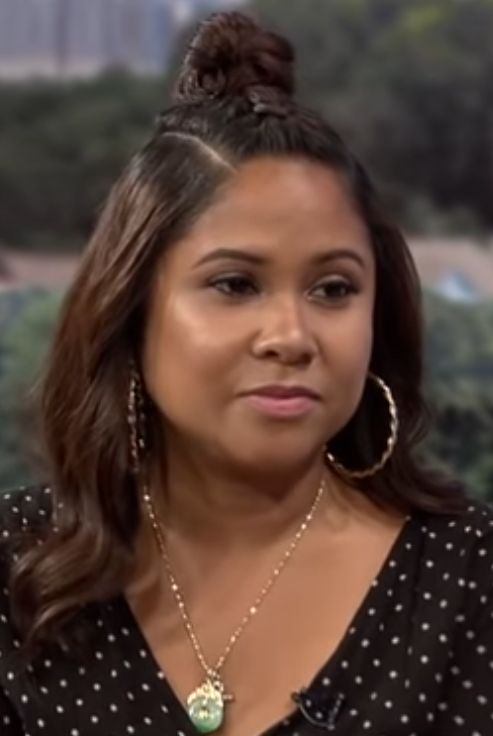
Angela Yee

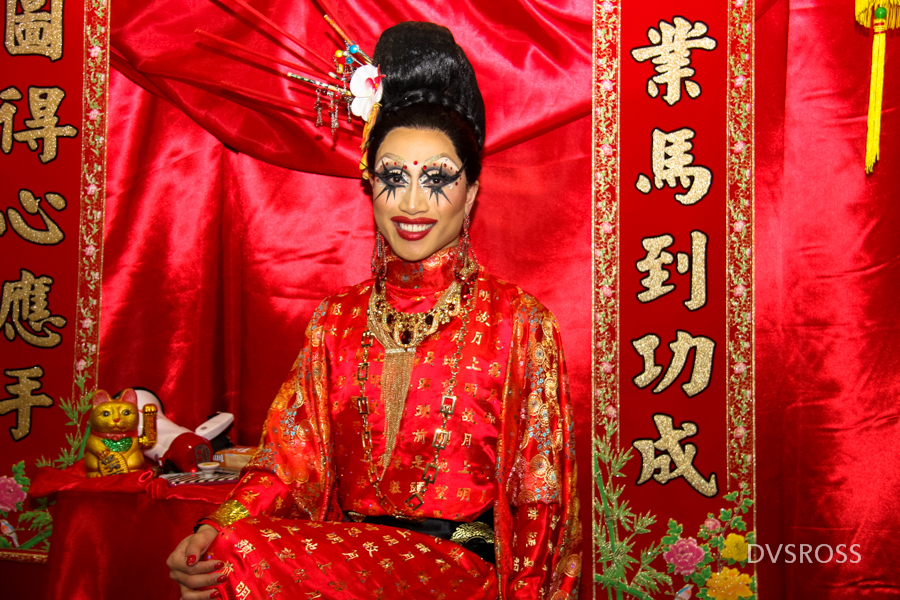
Yuhua Hamasaki

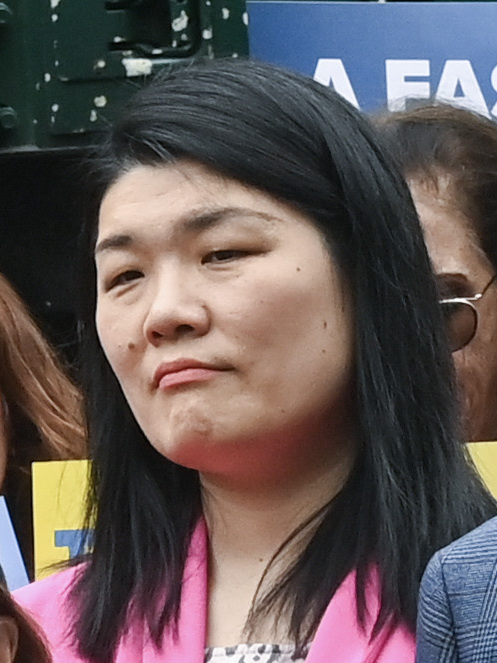
Susan Zhuang

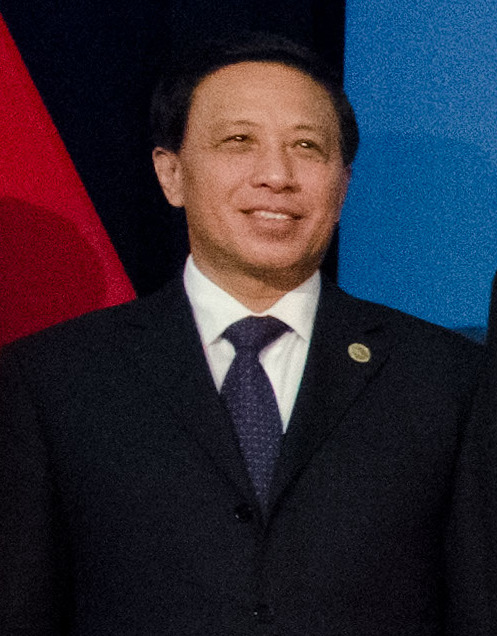
Zhang Yesui

=== Academia and humanities ===
- Anthony Chan – chief economist, JPMorgan Chase; former economist at the Federal Reserve Bank of New York and economics professor at the University of Dayton
- Peter Kwong – professor of Asian American studies at Hunter College and professor of sociology in the City University of New York system
- Betty Lee Sung – leading literary authority on Chinese Americans and former professor at City College of New York
- Tim Wu – professor at Columbia Law School
- Yiju Huang – assistant professor of Chinese and comparative literature at Fordham University

=== Academia and sciences ===
- Chia-Kun Chu – late professor emeritus of applied mathematics at Columbia University
- Chien-Shiung Wu – late experimental physicist and Columbia University professor
- David Ho – scientific researcher and Helen Wu professor at Columbia University
- Tsung-Dao Lee – university professor emeritus at Columbia University, Nobel Prize winner in physics
- Z.Y. Fu – founder of the Fu Foundation School of Engineering at Columbia University

=== Business ===
- Sam Chang – real estate and hotel developer
- James S.C. Chao – shipping magnate and father of former U.S. Cabinet member Elaine Chao
- Guo Wengui – billionaire businessman and political activist
- Andrea Jung – CEO and president of Grameen America, a non-profit microfinance company with philanthropy as its primary mission
- Kim Y. Lew – CEO, Columbia Investment Management Co., manager of the multi-billion dollar Columbia University endowment
- Peng Zhao – CEO, Citadel Securities
- Charles Wang – late owner, New York Islanders team of the National Hockey League
- Chris Jiashu Xu – real estate and hotel developer

=== Entrepreneurship and technology ===
- Perry Chen – co-founder of Kickstarter
- Christopher Cheung – co-founder, Boxed
- Chieh Huang – CEO and co-founder, Boxed
- William Fong – co-founder, Boxed
- Andrew Yang – founder, Venture for America; U.S. 2020 Democratic presidential candidate; candidate, New York City mayoral election 2021; and pioneer of the Universal Basic Income concept
- David Zhu – co-founder, Enterproid

=== Law, politics, and diplomacy ===
- Margaret Chan – New York State Supreme Court Civil Branch justice in Manhattan
- Steve Chan – New York State Senator, elected November 2024, representing the 17th district
- Lester Chang – New York State Assembly, elected November 2022, representing parts of Brooklyn
- Leigh Cheng – New York City Court judge, Brooklyn
- Chi Ossé – youngest ever member of the New York City Council to be elected, in January 2022 at age 23, to represent District 36 in Brooklyn
- Denny Chin – justice on the United States Court of Appeals for the Second Circuit in Manhattan
- Margaret Chin – first Chinese American woman elected to represent Manhattan's Chinatown on the New York City Council in 2009
- Iwen Chu – former New York State Senator, representing the 17th district (2023–2024)
- Peter Koo – New York City councilman elected in 2009 to represent District 20 in Queens
- Li Baodong – President of the United Nations Security Council during months in 2011 and 2012
- Doris Ling-Cohan – New York State Supreme Court Civil Branch justice in Manhattan
- Liu Jieyi – Permanent Representative of China to the United Nations from 2013 to 2017
- John Liu – first Taiwanese American, Chinese American, and Asian American to be elected New York City Comptroller, in 2009
- Ma Zhaoxu – current Permanent Representative of China to the United Nations, since January 2018
- Grace Meng – member of the United States House of Representatives, representing New York's 6th congressional district in Queens
- Qian Julie Wang – writer, civil rights lawyer
- Julie Su – Deputy Mayor for Economic Justice, New York City
- Fred Teng – president and founder of the America China Public Affairs Institute in 2012
- Nancy Tong – elected Democratic party female District Leader in November 2014, representing parts of Brooklyn, NY
- Wenjian Liu – first Chinese American officer in the New York City Police Department to die in the line of duty in 2014
- Wenliang Wang – honorary chairman, NYU Center on U.S.-China relations
- Eva Wong – Executive Director of the Mayor's Office of Community Mental Health, appointed by New York City Mayor Zohran Mamdani
- Phil Wong – councilman, New York City's 30th City Council district in Queens, elected in November 2025
- Peter Yew – Chinese Americans first protested police brutality with high-profile activism outside New York City Hall in May 1975, after the beating of this 27-year-old Chinese-American engineer who was a bystander at the scene of a traffic dispute in Chinatown in Manhattan.
- Yuh-Line Niou – former member of the New York State Assembly, representing the 65th District in Lower Manhattan, elected in November 2016, serving through 2022, and succeeded by Grace Lee, above
- Ben Yee – New York State Committee member and 2026 candidate for the 66th New York State Assembly district and Democratic Party Activist in New York City and candidate for New York City Public Advocate in 2019
- Susan Zhuang – New York City councilwoman, elected in November 2023, representing parts of South Brooklyn
- Zhang Yesui – Permanent Representative of China to the United Nations from 2008 to 2010

=== Media ===
Chinese people have emerged prominently in the New York City journalism sphere. This media subsection has been created to acknowledge this professional prominence.

- Ai Heping – journalist, China Daily
- An Rong Xu – photographer, journalist
- Kathy YL Chan – journalist, Bloomberg News
- Mable Chan – The New York Times
- Melissa Chan – journalist, NBC News
- Sewell Chan – executive editor, Columbia Journalism Review
- Wilfred Chan – The Guardian
- Clio Chang – journalist, Curbed
- Gordon G. Chang – journalist, multiple platforms
- Laura Chang – journalist, editor of the Booming blog, The New York Times
- Lia Chang – actress and photographic journalist, multiple media platforms
- William Y. Chang – late founder of the Chinese-American Times newspaper
- Chau Lam – Gothamist
- Adrian Chen – investigative journalist, staff writer at The New Yorker
- Aria Hangyu Chen – multimedia journalist
- Brian X. Chen – lead consumer technology journalist, The New York Times
- Caroline Chen – journalist, ProPublica
- David W. Chen – investigative journalist, City Hall bureau chief, The New York Times
- Elaine Chen – digital editor, The New York Times
- Stefanos Chen – real estate reporter, The New York Times
- Evelyn Cheng – journalist, CNBC
- Roger Cheng – executive editor in charge of breaking news, CNET News
- Paul Cheung – journalist, global director of interactive and digital news production, The Associated Press
- Ronny Chieng – comedian
- Lindsey Choo – journalist, Forbes
- Andrew R. Chow – journalist, The New York Times
- Denise Chow – science and technology editor, NBC News
- Dominic Chu – journalist, CNBC
- Christine Chung – journalist, The New York Times
- Connie Chung – journalist
- James Dao – op-ed editor, The New York Times
- Wendi Deng – media personality, film producer, and businessperson
- Christina Fan – journalist, WCBS-TV
- Emily Fu – real estate journalist, New York Post
- Scarlet Fu – Bloomberg Television anchor and New York Stock Exchange reporter
- Esther Fung – journalist, The Wall Street Journal
- Vivian Giang – journalist, The New York Times
- Lisa Kailai Han – journalist, Business Insider
- Amy He – journalist, China Daily
- Angela He – corporate communications specialist, The New York Times
- Gary He – journalist, Vox Media
- Hezi Jiang – journalist, China Daily
- Nicole Hong – law enforcement and courts journalist, The New York Times
- Hong Xiao – journalist, China Daily
- Cindy Hsu – journalist, WCBS-TV
- Tiffany Hsu – business reporter, The New York Times
- Krystal Hu – journalist, Reuters
- Winnie Hu – journalist, The New York Times
- Hua Hsu – journalist, The New Yorker
- Eddie Huang – writer, author of Fresh Off the Boat: A Memoir
- Virginia Huie – journalist, News 12 Long Island
- Jing Cao – journalist, Bloomberg News
- Jason Kao – journalist, The New York Times
- Hope King – senior business reporter, Axios
- Genevieve Ko – cooking editor, The New York Times
- K.K. Rebecca Lai – graphics editor, The New York Times
- Katherine Lam – digital producer, Fox News
- Esther Lee – deputy editor, The Knot
- Jennifer 8. Lee – journalist, credits including The New York Times
- Melissa Lee – news anchor, Fast Money on CNBC
- Clarissa-Jan Lim – journalist, MSNBC
- Kristin Lin – op-ed columnist, The New York Times
- Betty Liu – news anchor, Bloomberg Television
- Jennifer Liu – journalist, CNBC
- Denise Lu – The New York Times
- Lu Wang – journalist, Bloomberg News
- Richard Lui – news anchor, MSNBC and NBC News
- Michael Luo – journalist, The New York Times
- Sarah Min – investing reporter, CNBC
- Alfred Ng – associate engagement editor, New York Daily News
- Emily Ngo – journalist, Politico
- Niu Yue – journalist, China Daily
- Rong Xiaoqing – journalist, Curbed
- Shiyu (Shelly) Xu – field producer, Fox News
- Gillian Tan – Bloomberg Gadfly columnist covering private equity and mergers and acquisitions
- Terry Tang – deputy editorial page editor, The New York Times
- Kaity Tong – journalist, news anchor
- Crystal Tse – Bloomberg News
- Echo Wang – journalist, Reuters
- Christine Wang – news editor, CNBC
- Vivian Wang – journalist, The New York Times
- Justin Wee – photojournalist, The New York Times
- Andrea Wong – journalist, Bloomberg News
- Natalie Wong – journalist, Bloomberg News
- Vanessa Wong – journalist, BuzzFeed
- Ash Wu – journalist, The New York Times
- Ashley Wu – journalist, The New York Times
- Kimberly Yam – journalist, HuffPost
- Ellen Yan – The New York Times, Newsday
- Angela Yang – NBC News
- Jeff Yang – media consultant, "Tao Jones" columnist for The Wall Street Journal
- Lucy Yang – journalist, WABC-TV
- Maya Yang – journalist, The Guardian
- Stephen Yang – photojournalist, New York Post
- Yueqi Yang – journalist, Bloomberg News
- Angela Yee – radio personality
- Vivian Yee – journalist, The New York Times
- Claudia Yeung – communications director, Hong Kong Economic and Trade Office, New York
- Karen Yi – journalist, Gothamist
- Yong Xiong – investigative producer and journalist, CNN
- William Yu – digital media strategist
- Jada Yuan – travel correspondent, The New York Times
- Yun Li – journalist, CNBC
- Benjamin P. Zhang – journalist, Business Insider
- Raymond Zhong – climate change journalist, part of the 2021 Pulitzer Prize winning team for COVID-19 pandemic coverage, The New York Times
- Zijia Song – journalist, multiple media platforms

=== Theater, arts, and culture ===
- Celia Au – actress and filmmaker
- Malan Breton – fashion designer
- Kevin Chan – fashion designer
- Amy Chang – actress
- Fala Chen – actress
- Angel Chang – fashion designer
- Cheung Pei Pei – actress
- Margaret Cho – Korean-Chinese multi-hyphenate entertainer and LGBT social activist
- David Chu – fashion designer
- Grace Zia Chu – late author of Chinese cookbooks
- Diana Eng – fashion designer
- Ying Fang – principal soprano at the Metropolitan Opera
- Fei Fei Sun – supermodel
- Vivienne Hu – fashion designer
- David Henry Hwang – Broadway playwright, librettist, and screenwriter
- MC Jin – rapper
- Yue-Sai Kan – television host and producer, entrepreneur, fashion icon, author and humanitarian
- Jonathan Koon – fashion designer
- Derek Lam – fashion designer
- Lap Chi Chu – Off-Broadway set lighting
- Li Hongzhi – founder of Falun Gong
- Humberto Leon – fashion designer
- Tina Leung – actress, Bling Empire: New York
- Li Yu – actress
- Mimi Lien – Broadway set designer
- Phillip Lim – fashion designer
- Jenny Lin – pianist
- Joseph Lin – violinist
- Ling Tan – supermodel
- Lucy Liu – actress, fashion model, and artist
- Liu Wen – supermodel
- Chella Man – artist, actor, and transgender model
- Angela Mao – former actress and martial artist, aka "Lady Kung Fu"
- Ming Cho Lee – Broadway set designer
- Peter Mui – fashion designer, actor, and musician
- I.M. Pei – world-renowned late architect
- Mary Ping – fashion designer
- Shen Wei – choreographer, stage designer
- Mimi So – jewelry designer
- Phillipa Soo – Broadway actress
- Peter Som – fashion designer
- Anna Sui – fashion designer
- Brandon Sun – fashion designer
- Vivienne Tam – fashion designer
- Oscar and Hsin Mei Agnes Hsu Tang – philanthropists to the Metropolitan Museum of Art on the Upper East Side of Manhattan
- Alexander Wang – fashion designer
- Dorothy Wang – actress, Bling Empire: New York
- Vera Wang – fashion designer
- Yuja Wang – concert pianist
- Nymphia Wind – winner of RuPaul's Drag Race season 16; fashion designer
- BD Wong – Broadway actor
- Jason Wu – fashion designer
- Ximan Li – filmmaker
- Xin Ying – modern dancer
- Sophia Yan – classical pianist
- Bowen Yang – writer and actor, Saturday Night Live
- Yeohlee Teng – fashion designer
- Yuhua Hamasaki – drag queen
- Joe Zee – fashion stylist

== See also ==
- Asian Americans in New York City
- Bangladeshis in New York City
- Chinese Americans
- Demographics of New York City
- Filipinos in the New York metropolitan area
- Fuzhounese in New York City
- Indians in the New York City metropolitan region
- Japanese in New York City
- Koreans in New York City
- Russians in New York City
- Taiwanese people in New York City
