= Elaine Chao =

American businesswoman and government official (born 1953)

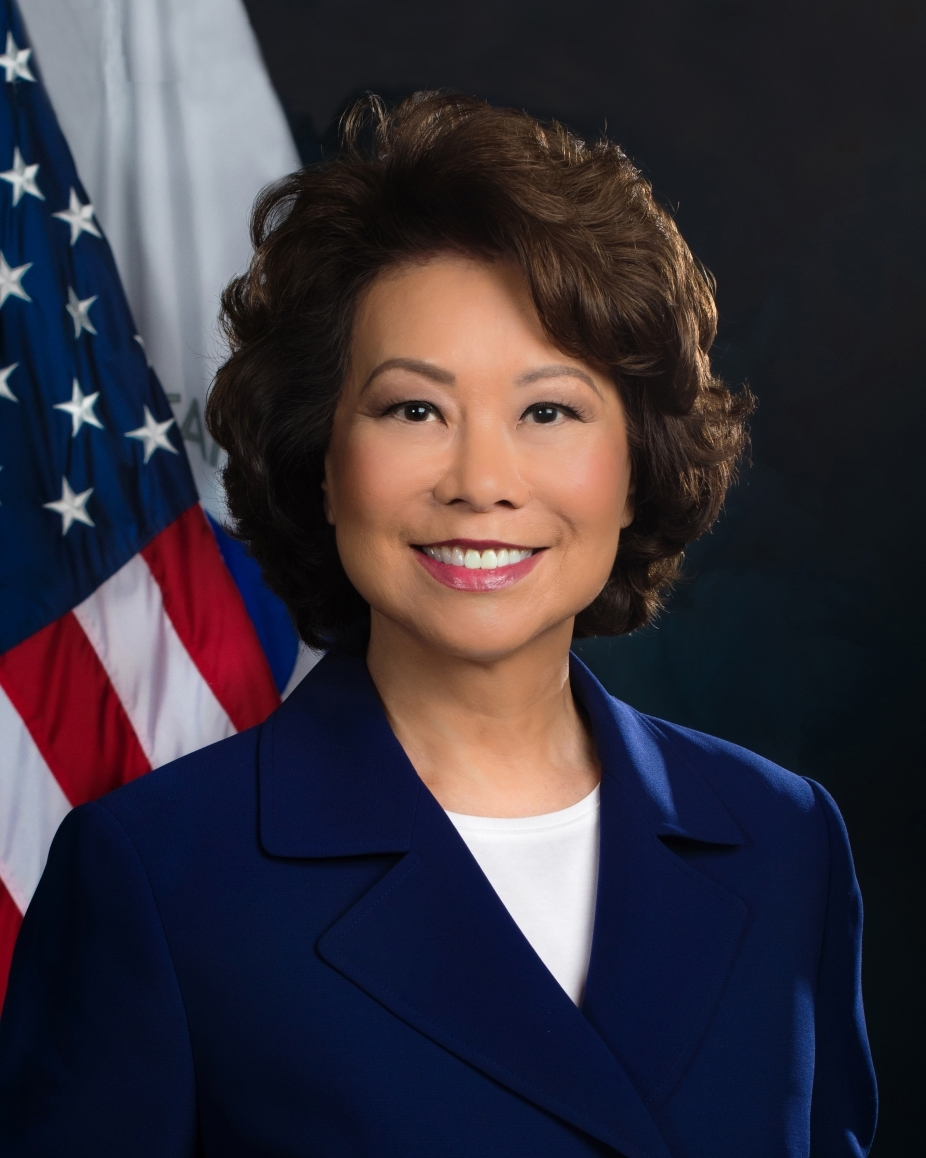
- Official portrait, 2019

18th United States Secretary of Transportation
- In office January 31, 2017 – January 11, 2021
- President: Donald Trump
- Deputy: Jeffrey A. Rosen; Steven G. Bradbury (acting)
- Preceded by: Anthony Foxx
- Succeeded by: Pete Buttigieg

24th United States Secretary of Labor
- In office January 29, 2001 – January 20, 2009
- President: George W. Bush
- Preceded by: Alexis Herman
- Succeeded by: Hilda Solis

12th Director of the Peace Corps
- In office October 8, 1991 – November 13, 1992
- President: George H. W. Bush
- Preceded by: Paul Coverdell
- Succeeded by: Carol Bellamy

4th United States Deputy Secretary of Transportation
- In office April 19, 1989 – October 18, 1991
- President: George H. W. Bush
- Preceded by: Mimi Weyforth Dawson
- Succeeded by: James B. Busey IV

Chair of the Federal Maritime Commission
- In office April 29, 1988 – April 19, 1989
- President: Ronald Reagan; George H. W. Bush
- Preceded by: Edward Hickey
- Succeeded by: James J. Carey

Commissioner of the Federal Maritime Commission
- In office April 29, 1988 – April 19, 1989
- President: Ronald Reagan; George H. W. Bush
- Preceded by: Edward Hickey
- Succeeded by: Ming Hsu

Personal details
- Born: Elaine Lan Chao; March 26, 1953 (age 73) Taipei, Taiwan
- Citizenship: Taiwan (before 1971); United States (since 1972)
- Party: Republican
- Spouse: Mitch McConnell (m. 1993)
- Parents: James S. C. Chao; Ruth Chu
- Relatives: Angela Chao (sister)
- Education: Mount Holyoke College (BA); Harvard University (MBA)
- Website: Official website

Chinese name
- Traditional Chinese: 趙小蘭
- Simplified Chinese: 赵小兰
Transcriptions
Standard Mandarin
- Hanyu Pinyin: Zhào Xiǎolán
- Wade–Giles: Chao^{4} Hsiao^{3}-lan^{2}
- Yale Romanization: Chau Syaulan
- IPA: [ʈʂâʊ ɕjàʊ.lǎn]
Yue: Cantonese
- Jyutping: Ziu^{6} Siu^{2} Laan^{4}
- Chao's voice Chao thanking truckers during the COVID-19 pandemic Recorded April 30, 2020

Elaine Lan Chao (born March 26, 1953) is an American businesswoman and former government official who served as the United States secretary of labor during the administration of George W. Bush from 2001 to 2009, and as the U.S. secretary of transportation during the first administration of Donald Trump from 2017 to 2021. A member of the Republican Party and the wife of U.S. senator Mitch McConnell, Chao was the first Asian-American woman to serve in a presidential cabinet. She resigned as secretary of transportation after the January 6 United States Capitol attack.

Chao was born in Taipei, Taiwan, and immigrated to the United States as a child. She was raised in Queens, New York, and on Long Island, and received degrees from Mount Holyoke College and Harvard Business School. She worked for financial institutions before being appointed to senior positions in the Department of Transportation under Presidents Ronald Reagan and George H. W. Bush, including chair of the Federal Maritime Commission (1988–1989) and Deputy Secretary of Transportation (1989–1991). She served as director of the Peace Corps from 1991 to 1992 and as president of the United Way of America from 1993 to 1996.

Chao has served on several Fortune 500 and nonprofit boards of directors, including the board of ChargePoint since 2021.

== Early life ==
Elaine Chao was born in Taipei, Taiwan, on March 26, 1953. She is the eldest of six daughters of Ruth Mulan Chu Chao, a historian from Anhui, and James S. C. Chao, a Shanghainese businessman who began his career as a merchant mariner and in 1964 founded the shipping company Foremost Maritime Corporation in New York City, which developed into the Foremost Group. In 1961, at the age of 8, Chao came to the United States on a 37-day freight ship journey with her mother and two of her sisters. Her father had arrived in New York three years earlier and sent money home until the rest of the family could join him.

Chao spoke no English upon her arrival in the U.S. She recalled that everything was foreign to her family, including American culture, traditions, and food. Chao's family initially lived in a one-bedroom apartment, with her father working three jobs to support them.

Chao attended Tsai Hsing Elementary School in Taiwan for kindergarten and first grade. She attended Syosset High School in Syosset, New York, and was naturalized as a U.S. citizen at the age of 19. She received a Bachelor of Arts degree in economics from Mount Holyoke College, and she also studied at Dartmouth College. She later received an MBA degree from Harvard Business School.

== Career ==
=== Early career ===
Before her government work, Chao was a vice president for syndications at Bank of America Capital Markets Group in San Francisco, and was an international banker at Citicorp in New York. She was granted a White House Fellowship during the Reagan Administration. In 1986, she became Deputy Administrator of the Maritime Administration in the U.S. Department of Transportation. She subsequently served as the chairwoman of the Federal Maritime Commission (1988–1989), as the deputy secretary of transportation under U.S. president George H. W. Bush (1989–1991), and as the director of the Peace Corps (1991–1992). She established the Peace Corps' first programs in Poland, Latvia, Lithuania, Estonia, Ukraine, Georgia, Armenia and Russia. Chao was the first Asian American to serve in any of these positions.

=== Between Bush administrations ===
Following her service in President George H.W. Bush's administration, Chao worked from 1992 to 1996 as president and CEO of United Way of America. She was the first Asian American to hold that role. She is credited with returning credibility and public trust to the organization after a financial mismanagement scandal involving former president William Aramony. From 1996 until her appointment as Secretary of Labor, Chao worked at a conservative think tank in Washington, D.C. She was also a board member of the Independent Women's Forum. She later returned to think tanks after leaving the government in January 2009. Chao delivered a speech at the 2000 Republican National Convention.

=== U.S. Secretary of Labor (2001–2009) ===
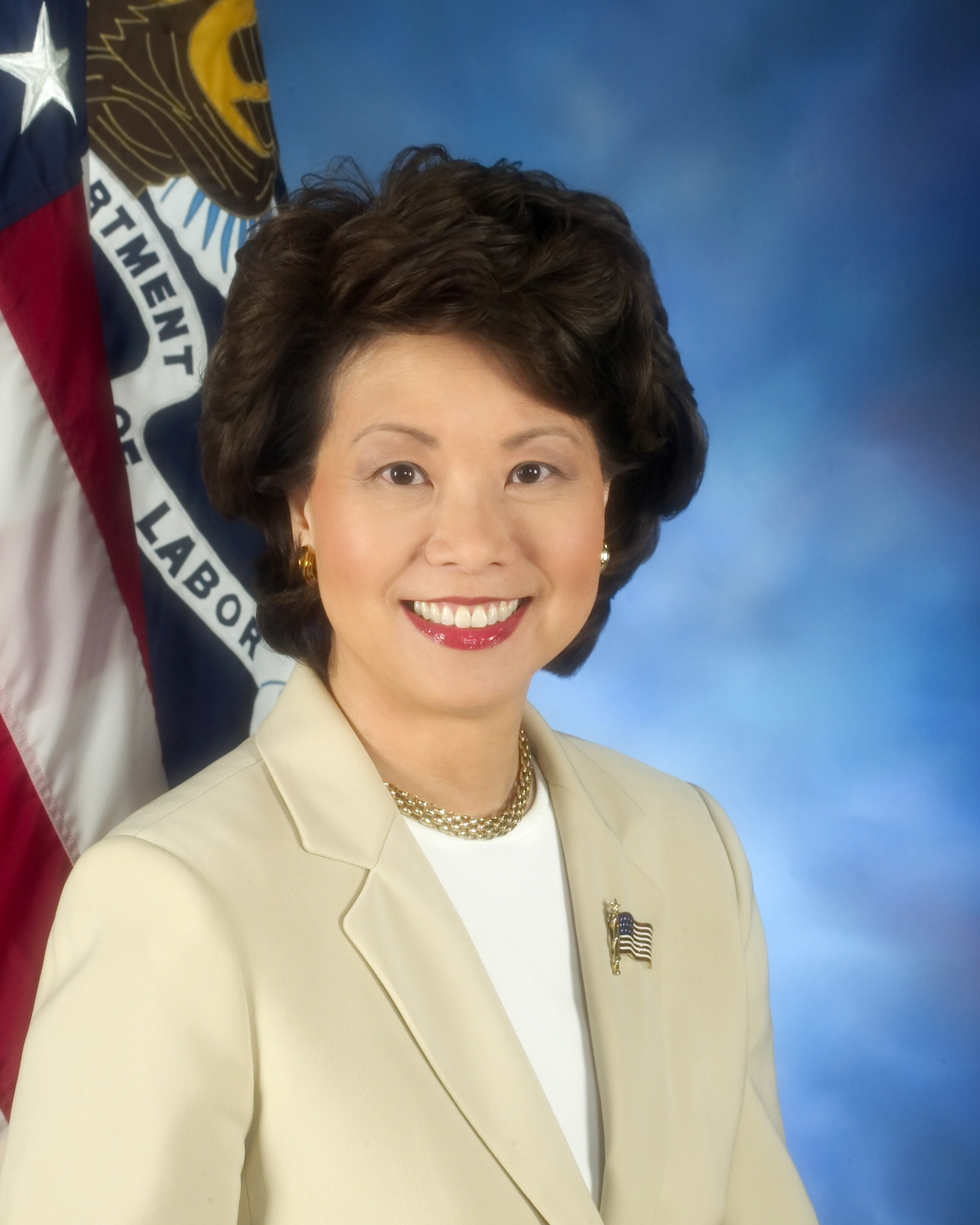
Official Secretary of Labor photo

Chao was the only cabinet member in the George W. Bush administration to serve for the entirety of his eight years. She was also the longest-serving Secretary of Labor since Frances Perkins, who served from 1933 to 1945 under President Franklin D. Roosevelt. Chao was unanimously confirmed by the Senate for her appointment as Secretary of Labor. Of Chao's staff, Victoria Lipnic, Assistant Secretary for Employment Standards Administration, later became Member, EEOC and acting chair.

In 2002, the Bush administration obtained a national emergency injunction to end an employers' lockout of unionized dockworkers on the West Coast, invoking the Taft–Hartley Act for the first time since 1971 after Chao had been unable to negotiate a new contract between the employers and the union in a dispute over the use of new technology. In 2004, the department issued revisions of the white-collar overtime regulations under the Fair Labor Standards Act.

==== Union pension plan and trust disclosure requirements ====
In 2003, the department updated the labor union financial disclosure regulations under the Landrum–Griffin Act of 1959, requiring more extensive disclosures for union-sponsored pension plans and union-related trusts such as strike funds.

==== Response to 9/11 and Hurricane Katrina ====
Following the terrorist attacks of September 11, 2001, Chao's Department of Labor disbursed grants to provide temporary jobs to assist in cleanup and restoration efforts in New York, as well as the Occupational Safety and Health Administration's monitoring of health and safety of cleanup work being performed at the disaster sites including lower Manhattan. The department also provided unemployment insurance and income support to those who lost their jobs in the aftermath of September 11.

Following the 2005 hurricane season, which included hurricanes Katrina, Rita and Wilma, the Labor Department disbursed nearly $380 million in grants to assist with cleanup work and provide benefits and services to those displaced by the storms. The Occupational Safety and Health Administration (OSHA) and other agencies deployed personnel to the region to provide safety training and uphold workers' rights. Chao set up an emergency response hotline dedicated to the Gulf Coast region for people seeking benefits and worker protection information. The suspension of the Davis–Bacon Act of 1931 and OSHA protections in the aftermath of Hurricane Katrina has been linked to the exploitation of illegal immigrant workers in New Orleans, who often worked without protective gear in hazardous conditions and were underpaid

==== Government Accountability Office reports ====
After analyzing 70,000 closed case files from 2005 to 2007, the Government Accountability Office reported that the Department's Wage and Hour Division (WHD) inadequately investigated complaints from low- and minimum-wage workers alleging that employers failed to pay the federal minimum wage, required overtime, and failed to issue a last paycheck. The Department of Labor responded that the GAO investigation focused on individual complaints while the department remained focused on resolving complex and multi-employee complaints; from 1997 to 2007 the annual number of employees receiving back wages as a result of DOL action almost doubled and the dollar amount of back wages paid more than doubled. The Washington Post echoed that Chao's department was criticized by some for "walking away from its regulatory function" but also praised by others for providing "compliance assistance" and "helping companies abide by the law" rather than "punitive enforcement that ... stifles economic growth."

A 2008 Government Accountability Office report noted that the Labor Department gave Congress inaccurate numbers which understated the expense of contracting out its employees' work to private firms during Chao's tenure, which may have affected 22 employees at the department.

==== Mining regulation ====
Chao and the Bush administration proposed quadrupling the fines imposed against mining corporations for mine safety breaches and sued mine operators for failing to maintain safe working conditions. A 2007 report by the department's Office of Inspector General (OIG) found that mine safety regulators did not conduct federally required inspections at more than one in seven of the country's 731 underground coal mines in 2006, and that the number of worker deaths in mining accidents more than doubled to 47 in that year. The Mine Safety and Health Administration (MSHA) "missed 147 inspections at 107 mines employing a total of 7,500 workers".

Mining disasters in 2006 and 2007 included West Virginia's Sago Mine explosion, which killed 12 in January 2006; West Virginia's Alma Mine fire, which killed two in January 2006; the Darby Mine No. 1 explosion in Kentucky, where five miners died in May 2006; and the Crandall Canyon Mine collapse in Utah, which killed six workers and three rescuers in August 2007. Immediately following the Sago mine disaster, Secretary Chao vowed to "take the necessary steps to ensure that this never happens again".

In 2010, the widows of the two men killed in the Alma Mine fire sued the federal government for wrongful death, citing lack of inspections, failure to act against violations, and conflicts of interest. "MSHA's review of the fire acknowledged significant lapses by inspectors, supervisors and district managers" at the mine but the agency did not admit liability for the negligent inspections. In 2013, the appeals court ruled that MSHA can be held liable "when a negligent inspection results in the wrongful death of a coal miner". The suit was settled in 2014; MSHA also agreed to develop a training course on preventing fires in underground mines.

==== Workplace safety ====
A 2009 inspector general report evaluating an Occupational Safety and Health Administration (OSHA) initiative on problematic workplaces for the prior six years found that OSHA, a regulatory agency within the Department of Labor, had failed to gather needed data, conducted uneven inspections and enforcement, and failed to record all fatalities because company names were misspelled or did not account for when companies shared the same owner. The audit also noted that after rules changes in January 2008 the number of targeted companies declined by almost half. In the opinion of FreightWaves, a price reporting agency for the global freight market, during Chao's tenure the Department of Labor achieved "record low worker injury, illness and fatality rates; record back wages recovered; [and] record monetary recoveries for workers' pension plans".

=== Post-Bush administration (2009–2017) ===
In 2009, Chao resumed her previous role at a think tank, and she contributed to Fox News and other media outlets. She also served as a director on a number of corporate and non-profit boards, including the Institute of Politics at Harvard Kennedy School, Wells Fargo, New York–Presbyterian Hospital, News Corp, Dole Food Company, and Protective Life Corporation. According to financial disclosure forms, Chao was slated to receive $1–5 million as compensation for her service on the board of Wells Fargo. In June 2011, she was awarded the Woodrow Wilson Award for Public Service.

In January 2015, she resigned from the board of Bloomberg Philanthropies, which she had joined in 2012, because of its plans to significantly increase support for the Sierra Club's "Beyond Coal" initiative. In February 2017, the Associated Press reported that Chao was paid by a speaker's bureau to give a speech regarding women's empowerment to an organization later found to be linked to the People's Mujahedin of Iran (aka Mojahedin-e Khalq or MEK), a group exiled from Iran after actions in the 1970s against the Shah of Iran and the Ayatollah Khomeini. Similar speeches were delivered by former Joint Chiefs of Staff General Hugh Shelton, Commandant of the U.S. Marine Corps General James T. Conway, former National Security Advisor General James L. Jones, former CIA Directors Porter Goss and James Woolsey, former FBI Director Louis Freeh, former NYC Mayor Rudy Giuliani, and former Governors Howard Dean of Vermont and Ed Rendell of Pennsylvania.

=== U.S. Secretary of Transportation (2017–2021) ===
U.S. President-elect Donald Trump announced on November 29, 2016, that he would nominate Chao to be Secretary of Transportation. The U.S. Senate confirmed Chao on January 31, 2017, by a vote of 93–6, with her husband, then-Senate majority leader Mitch McConnell, abstaining. As Secretary of Transportation, Chao led the presidential delegation to the enthronement ceremony for Japanese emperor Naruhito. She led the U.S. delegation to the inauguration of Indonesia's President Joko Widodo.

==== Drone technology ====
In 2017, Chao announced the establishment of a pilot program to test and evaluate the integration of civil and public drone operations into the airspace system. In 2018, ten applicants were selected to participate in the project. In 2019, the Federal Aviation Administration (FAA) issued an air carrier and operator certificate to UPS Flight Forward for drone deliveries to a hospital campus in Raleigh, North Carolina. In December 2019, after multiple reports in Colorado and Nebraska of unidentified objects flying in formation at night over several remote rural counties, the FAA proposed a new rule that would require drones to be remotely identifiable.

Jeffrey A. Rosen chaired Chao's New and Emerging Technologies Council (NETT) Chao and Rosen led DOTs efforts to safely enable the use of drones in the airspace, including in FAA's drone pilot program. The DOT under Chao issued updated guidelines on automated or "self-driving" cars and trucks. He also helped with FAA's successful efforts to reform its regulations and restore the U.S. lead in enabling the largest number of private commercial space launches.

Under Chao, Rosen served as Chair of DOT's Regulatory Reform Task Force. He and Chao focused on improving the infrastructure permitting process, and reforming the regulatory system to reduce costs.

==== COVID-19 responses ====
In May 2020, following the start of the COVID-19 outbreak and related changes to travel, Chao sternly warned airlines to follow their published ticket refund procedures, as well as DOT regulations, in light of high demand for travel changes. She demanded airlines provide cash refunds (as opposed to vouchers) when required by law, and urged them to provide cash refunds as broadly as possible.

Chao later announced the disbursement of $1.2 billion in grants to airports to maintain readiness for when passenger travel returned. The funds were distributed to 405 airports for infrastructure and safety improvements, such as improved runway lighting. Eight tribal governments were also awarded separate transportation funds to maintain infrastructure during COVID.

Chao also worked to permit truckers to deliver essential goods to New York City, which had been attempting to impose a 14-day quarantine on out-of-state truckers bringing goods into the city. The city dropped the requirement following federal government pressure. Her department also worked with state governments to maintain access to highway rest areas, including permitting food trucks to provide hot food to truckers and travelers.

The CARES Act enabled the Department of Transportation to make $114 billion of federal aid available for the transportation sector. The largest allocation was $25 billion to support local public transit systems, of which $22.7 billion was dedicated to large and small urban areas and the remaining $2.2 billion for rural areas. The Act also made available $10 billion for grants to commercial and general aviation airports for capital expenditures, operating expenses such as payroll and utilities, and debt payments; and a $1.02 billion allocation for grants to Amtrak to cover lost revenues, buy fuel and construction materials, and maintain its route network. The CARES Act also enabled the department to provide assistance to the aviation sector through loans and loan guarantees and grants for worker and contractor pay and benefits.

==== Other proposals ====
In March 2019, Chao announced the formation of the Non-Traditional and Emerging Transportation Technology (NETT) Council, an internal Department of Transportation group for identifying "jurisdictional and regulatory gaps" when considering new transportation technologies. In April 2019, the FAA released proposed new regulations to modernize the rules for commercial space flight launches and reentries. At a congressional hearing in July 2019, the president of the Commercial Spaceflight Federation criticized the proposal as not delivering on its stated goals.

In October 2019, Chao launched the Rural Opportunities to Use Transportation for Economic Success (ROUTES) initiative, intended to improve rural transportation infrastructure. It sought to achieve this goal by developing tools and information, aggregating DOT resources, and providing technical assistance. The program is intended to consider the unique needs of rural transportation networks to meet national goals of safety, mobility, and economic competitiveness.

The U.S. Department of Transportation reportedly sought to cut funding and loan guarantees for domestic American shipping companies, shipyards, and shipbuilders. These proposed budget cuts were rejected by Congress. Chao's Department also sought for three years to prevent funding for a program that supports the viability of small domestic U.S. shipyards, and a separate program that issues loan guarantees for the construction or reconstruction of ships with American registration.

==== Resignation ====
On January 7, 2021, the day after the January 6 United States Capitol attack, Chao submitted her resignation effective January 11, 2021. She was then the highest-ranking member of the administration to resign due to the riots and the first cabinet officer to do so; her resignation cited the "traumatic and entirely avoidable" violence and stated that it "deeply troubled" her. After Chao's resignation, Trump referred to her with a racial slur and called her a "China lover". The slur was immediately condemned by Republicans and Democrats as well as Asian-American organizations and other community leaders, including the CEO of the Anti-Defamation League. Trump also referred to Chao as "crazy".

=== Recent work (2021–present) ===
In 2021, Chao joined the board of directors of the Kroger supermarket chain and the board of trustees of the John F. Kennedy Center for the Performing Arts. In 2023, she publicly rebuked Trump for a series of racist attacks he made on her during his 2024 presidential campaign. The following year, Chao joined the board of directors of Mobileye. In 2025, Trump appointed her to the board of trustees of the Kennedy Center.

== Controversies ==
In 2013, Super PAC Progress Kentucky stated in a tweet that Chao was Mitch McConnell's "Chinese wife" and that this "[m]ay explain why your job moved to China", linking to conspiracy theorist and radio host Jeff Rense's website. After being criticized by Democrats and Republicans for racially insensitive tweets, Progress Kentucky apologized and deleted them. In 2014, the owner of a Democratic political consulting firm in Northern Kentucky responded to Mitch McConnell's remarks at a Republican breakfast by posting in her personal Twitter account that Chao "isn't from KY, she is Asian". The Kentucky Democratic Party denounced the tweet, and the owner deleted her Twitter account.

Critics have claimed that the Chao family's shipping company, Foremost Group, has ties to China. From January 2018 to April 2019, 72% of the total tonnage of chartered cargo shipped by Foremost was shipped to and from China. During Mitch McConnell's reelection campaign in 2020, his Democratic opponent Amy McGrath accused McConnell of making "millions from China". The Washington Post called these claims "spurious" and rated them "three Pinocchios" out of a possible four, remarking that, although McConnell is one of the wealthiest senators in Congress, "The story of how McConnell got rich has nothing to do with Chinese trade deals, spycraft or the coronavirus. He simply married into a higher tax bracket."

As Secretary of Transportation, Chao appeared in at least a dozen interviews with her 96-year-old father, James, the founder of her family's shipping company. Some media outlets said the appearances raised ethical concerns, as public officials are prohibited from using their office to profit others or themselves; a report by the Transportation Department's Inspector General, released in March 2021, cited multiple instances where Chao's office had helped to promote her family's shipping business. The Inspector General had asked the Trump administration's Justice Department in December 2020 to consider a criminal investigation into Chao, but the DOJ denied the request. Federal disclosures cited by The New York Times revealed a gift to Chao and her husband from Chao's father in 2017 valued between $5 million and $25 million.

Chao pledged in 2017 to divest into cash the "deferred stock units" (non-transferrable stock equivalents) she had earned while she was on the board of directors of Vulcan Materials by April 2018. After the Wall Street Journal and other major news outlets reported in late May 2019 that she was still holding the stock, worth $250,000 to $500,000, she sold it on June 3, 2019, for a gain of $50,000 since April 2018; a report by the Inspector General did "not identify any evidence of a financial conflict of interest".

An October 2018 Politico analysis found that Chao had more than 290 hours of appointments which were labelled as "private" during working hours on working days in the first 14 months of her tenure as Secretary of Transportation, which former Department of Transportation officials described as unusual. DoT officials stated that the "private" labeling existed to help ensure Chao's security.

In June 2019, Politico reported that in 2017 Chao had designated her aide Todd Inman as a special liaison "to help with grant applications and other priorities" for Transportation Department projects in the state of Kentucky, the only state to have such a liaison. Inman was to act as an intermediary between the department, local Kentucky officials, and Kentucky Senator Mitch McConnell, who is Chao's husband. This resulted in grants of at least $78 million for projects in Mitch McConnell strongholds Boone County and Owensboro. Inman had worked on the 2008 and 2014 re-election campaigns of McConnell; McConnell and local officials brought up the grants when he announced in Owensboro in December 2018 that he was running for re-election in 2020. Inman later became Chao's chief of staff. However, the Inspector General "did not find any irregularities" with respect to grants benefitting Kentucky and saw awards to Kentucky that were "consistent with other States' results" and "did not find evidence of steering" and concluded that the investigation "did not uncover evidence that Mr. Inman influenced grant awards benefiting Kentucky or gave Kentucky applicants an improper advantage".

In May 2020, the Trump administration removed the acting Inspector General of the Transportation Department, Mitch Behm. Behm, who was not a political appointee, was conducting an investigation into whether Secretary Elaine Chao was giving preferential treatment to projects in Kentucky. Her husband, Mitch McConnell, is the Senator of Kentucky and faced a re-election bid at the time. Trump appointed Howard "Skip" Elliott as interim Inspector General of the Transportation Department to replace Behm. However, at the same time, Elliott served as the head of one of the DoT's agencies, a role where Chao was his boss. Thus, Elliott had been put in charge of an office that was investigating his own actions and those of Chao.

In September 2019, the Democratic-controlled House of Representatives Committee on Oversight and Reform began an investigation into whether she used political office to benefit her family's business interests. A September 16 letter from the Oversight committee to Chao documented allegations that the Department of Transportation was forced to cancel a trip to China in 2017 that Chao had planned to take because State Department ethics officials challenged her attempts to include her family members in official meetings with the Chinese government. The trip was canceled due to scheduling issues and no ethics charges were sustained.

On March 4, 2021, the Inspector General released their report regarding numerous ethics violations, (Note: Adding family members and personal events to a planned (though later cancelled) trip to China in 2017, providing DOT Public Affairs and media support to her father ...) including using department resources for personal errands and for promoting her father's biography. It also stated that it had referred its investigation to the Justice Department and the U.S. Attorney's Office in Washington D.C. for criminal prosecution in December 2020. Both declined to open criminal investigations into Chao.

== Awards and honorary degrees ==
Chao holds 38 honorary doctorates, including an honorary Doctor of Humane Letters from Georgetown McDonough School of Business in 2015. She was initiated into Omicron Delta Kappa at SUNY Plattsburgh as an honoris causa initiate in 1996. In 2006, inaugural class of winner of the Great Immigrants Award named by Carnegie Corporation of New York. In 2024 she received the Herman Kahn Award for her lifetime contributions to society. In 2026, Chao was awarded the Grand Cordon of the Order of the Rising Sun.

In 2026, Chao was recognized as the sponsor and "Godmother" of the U.S. maritime training ship State of Maine, which will be used at the Maine Maritime Academy.

== Personal life ==
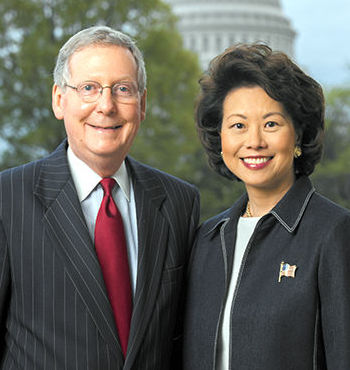
Chao and her husband, Mitch McConnell

In 1993, Chao married Mitch McConnell, U.S. Senator from Kentucky.

The University of Louisville's Ekstrom Library opened the "McConnell-Chao Archives" in November 2009. It is a major component of the university's McConnell Center.

From July 2022 onward, Trump had criticized McConnell's leadership on social media and directed attacks at Chao, including calling her "Coco Chow," which was widely condemned as racist. In a statement to Politico in January 2023, Chao said that people had "deliberately misspelled or mispronounced my name. Asian Americans have worked hard to change that experience for the next generation. He doesn't seem to understand that, which says a whole lot more about him than it will ever say about Asian Americans."

Chao was traveling in China for a long-planned philanthropic visit when her husband experienced cardiac arrest and was hospitalized on June 14, 2026. She returned to the U.S. on July 7. Her spokesperson said, "The Senator's health did not warrant an immediate return to the U.S.."

=== Campaigning ===
In the two years leading up to the 2014 U.S. Senate elections, during which time Chao was not in public office, Chao "headlined fifty of her own events and attended hundreds more with and on behalf of" her husband and was seen as "a driving force of his reelection campaign" and eventual victory over Democratic candidate Alison Lundergan Grimes, who had portrayed McConnell as "anti-woman". After winning the election, McConnell said, "The biggest asset I have by far is the only Kentucky woman who served in a president's cabinet, my wife, Elaine Chao."

She has been described by Jan Karzen, a longtime friend of McConnell's, as adding "a softer touch" to McConnell's style by speaking of him "in a feminine, wifely way". Chao has also been described as "the campaign hugger". The New York Times described her as "unapologetically ambitious".

Chao's father has donated "millions of dollars" to the Chao-McConnell family. Chao's extended family has given more than a million dollars to McConnell's campaigns. The extended family is also a top contributor to the Republican Party of Kentucky, giving it approximately $525,000 over two decades.

=== Family ===
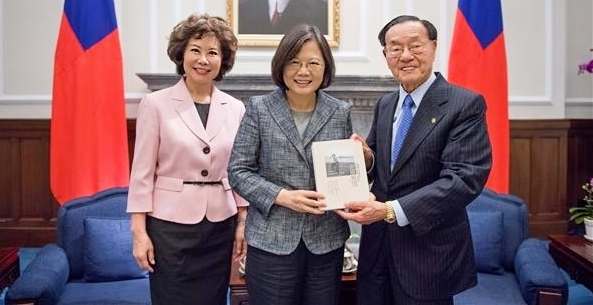
Elaine Chao and her father James S. C. Chao met Taiwanese President Tsai Ing-wen at the Presidential Office in Taipei, Taiwan, in 2016.

Chao has five younger sisters, including Angela, former CEO of the Foremost Group. Angela died in February 2024.

Chao's sister Grace is married to Gordon Hartogensis who served as director of the Pension Benefit Guaranty Corporation (PBGC), a part of the Labor Department, in May 2019. Hartogensis co-founded forecasting-software company Petrolsoft in 1989, which was purchased for $60 million by Aspen Technology in 2000. He founded and led application software company Auric Technology LLC until it was sold to a company based in Mexico in 2011 and then helped govern the Hartogensis Family Trust.

In April 2008, Chao's father gave Chao and McConnell between $5 million and $25 million.

In 2012, the Chao family donated $40 million to Harvard Business School for scholarships to students of Chinese heritage and for the Ruth Mulan Chu Chao Center, an executive education building named for Chao's late mother. It is the first Harvard Business School building named after a woman and the first building named after an American of Asian ancestry. Ruth Mulan Chu Chao returned to school at age 51 to earn a master's degree in Asian literature and history from St. John's University in the Queens borough of New York City.

Elaine Chao, along with the Chao family, is Christian.

== See also ==
- Taiwanese Americans in New York City
- Chinese Americans in New York City
- List of female United States Cabinet members
- List of United States Cabinet members who have served more than eight years
- List of foreign-born United States Cabinet members
- List of people who have held multiple United States Cabinet-level positions

== Notes ==
Government offices
Preceded by Paul Coverdell	Director of the Peace Corps; 1991–1992	Succeeded by Carol Bellamy
Political offices
Preceded by Mimi Weyforth Dawson	United States Deputy Secretary of Transportation; 1989–1991	Succeeded by Mortimer L. Downey
Preceded by Alexis Herman	United States Secretary of Labor; 2001–2009	Succeeded by Hilda Solis
Preceded by Anthony Foxx	United States Secretary of Transportation; 2017–2021	Succeeded by Pete Buttigieg
U.S. order of precedence (ceremonial)
Preceded by Mel Martínez as Former U.S. Cabinet Member	Order of precedence of the United States as Former U.S. Cabinet Member	Succeeded by Gale Norton as Former U.S. Cabinet Member
