= Michael P. Jackson =

American government official (born 1954)

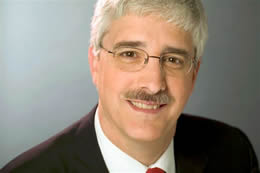

3rd United States Deputy Secretary of Homeland Security
- In office March 10, 2005 – October 26, 2007
- President: George W. Bush
- Preceded by: James Loy
- Succeeded by: Paul A. Schneider

7th United States Deputy Secretary of Transportation
- In office May 5, 2001 – August 28, 2003
- President: George W. Bush
- Preceded by: Mortimer L. Downey
- Succeeded by: Maria Cino

Personal details
- Born: April 28, 1954 (age 72)
- Education: University of Houston, Georgetown University

Michael Peter Jackson (born April 28, 1954) is an American former government official who served as the George W. Bush administration's Deputy Secretary of the Department of Homeland Security, beginning in March 2005 and ending with his resignation in October 2007. Jackson is a member of the Homeland Security Advisory Council.

== Education ==
Jackson studied at the University of Houston (B.A.) under Ross M. Lence and received a Ph.D. with distinction from the Government Department at Georgetown University in 1985.

== Earlier private sector career ==
Before returning to DOT in 2001, Jackson worked in the private sector as Chief Operating Officer at Lockheed Martin IMS's Transportation Systems and Services. IMS's transportation group provided high technology services to toll authorities, freight companies and 35 state governments. From 1993 until 1997, Jackson was Senior Vice President at the American Trucking Associations, where he managed inter modal, international and technology policy matters.

Between 2003 and 2005, Jackson served as Senior Vice President of AECOM Technology Corporation, where he was responsible for AECOM government relations and international business development.

He has been a researcher at the American Enterprise Institute and has taught political science at the University of Georgia and Georgetown University.

== Private sector career ==
After leaving government service, Jackson became a founder and the president of Firebreak Partners, LLC, a firm which was created to "design, integrate and lease core security technology systems needed to protect commercial aviation, maritime freight transportation and other critical infrastructure." In February 2009, he was elected to the board of AirTran Holdings, Inc., which, among other things, controls the regional airline, AirTran.

Jackson is the current CEO of physical security information management provider VidSys.

== Government career ==
=== Deputy Secretary of Homeland Security ===
Jackson was confirmed by the United States Senate to serve as Deputy Secretary of the Department of Homeland Security on March 10, 2005. In this role, he served as the Department's chief operating officer, with responsibility for managing the day-to-day operations. Jackson resigned this post effective October 26, 2007, "for financial reasons I can no longer ignore."

=== Deputy Secretary of the United States Department of Transportation ===
Jackson served as Deputy Secretary of the U.S. Department of Transportation (DOT) from May 2001 to August 2003. As deputy secretary, Jackson was that department's chief operating officer, with responsibility for day-to-day operations of an organization that, following the terrorist attacks of September 11, 2001, grew to a $68 billion annual budget supporting over 179,000 employees.

His tenure was particularly focused on DOT's response to the terrorist attacks, including standing up the new Transportation Security Administration and management of recovery efforts for the nation's aviation industry. He served as a member of the board of directors of Amtrak and was chairman of its audit committee.

In 2004, Jackson was appointed to serve on the President's Commission on Implementation of United States Space Exploration Policy, which provided management recommendations to the President on NASA and its future mission management.

In addition to holding three positions during the tenure of George W. Bush, Jackson also held positions for two earlier presidents. In the administration of President George H. W. Bush, he served at the White House as special assistant to the President for Cabinet liaison and later as chief of staff to the Secretary of Transportation. He held several positions reporting to the Secretary of Education in the administration of President Ronald Reagan.

Political offices
Preceded by James Loy	United States Deputy Secretary of Homeland Security; 2005–2007	Succeeded by Paul A. Schneider
