= James B. Busey IV =

5th United States Deputy Secretary of Transportation, United States Navy admiral

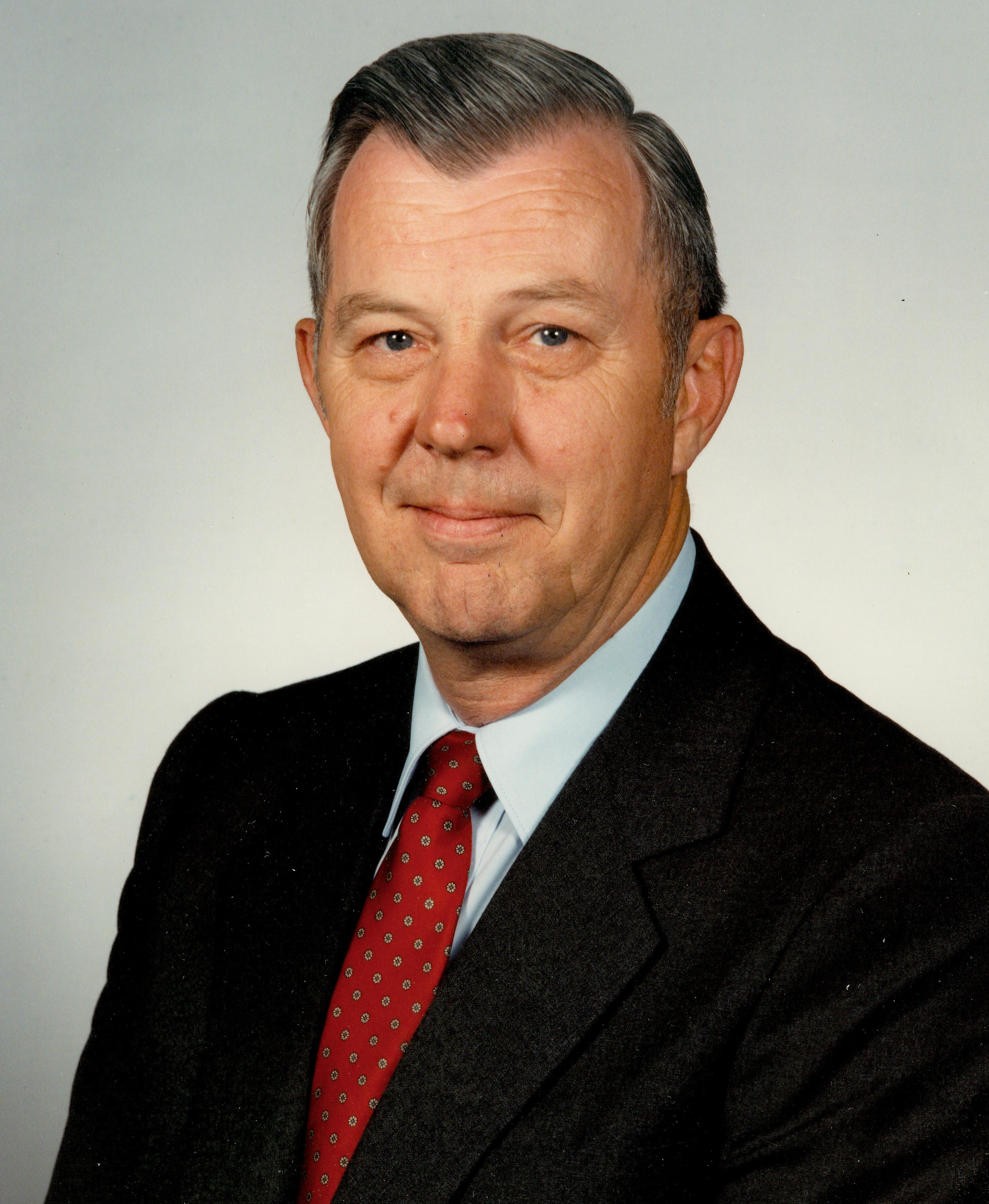
- Busey as Administrator of the Federal Aviation Administration, 1989

5th United States Deputy Secretary of Transportation
- In office December 4, 1991 – February 21, 1992
- President: George H. W. Bush
- Secretary: Samuel K. Skinner
- Preceded by: Elaine Chao
- Succeeded by: Mortimer L. Downey

11th Administrator of the Federal Aviation Administration
- In office June 30, 1989 – December 4, 1991
- President: George H. W. Bush
- Preceded by: T. Allan McArtor
- Succeeded by: Thomas C. Richards

22nd Vice Chief of Naval Operations
- In office September 1985 – March 1987
- President: Ronald Reagan
- Preceded by: Ronald J. Hays
- Succeeded by: Huntington Hardisty

Personal details
- Born: James Buchanan Busey IV; October 2, 1932 Peoria, Illinois, U.S.
- Died: April 21, 2023 (aged 90) Lincoln, California, U.S.
- Nickname: "Jim"

Military service
- Allegiance: United States
- Branch/service: United States Navy
- Years of service: 1952–1989
- Rank: Admiral
- Commands: Vice Chief of Naval Operations; Naval Air Station Lemoore; VA-216; VFA-125
- Battles/wars: Vietnam War
- Awards: Navy Cross; Defense Distinguished Service Medal (3); Navy Distinguished Service Medal (3); Legion of Merit (5); Distinguished Flying Cross (3); Bronze Star Medal

James Buchanan Busey IV (October 2, 1932 – April 21, 2023) was an American government official and four-star admiral of the United States Navy. He served as Vice Chief of Naval Operations from 1985 to 1987 and as Commander in Chief, United States Naval Forces Europe/Commander in Chief, Allied Forces Southern Europe from 1987 to 1989.

== Early years ==
James Buchanan Busey IV was born on October 2, 1932, in the city of Peoria, Illinois, son of James Buchanan Busey III and Louise (née Rogers). In January 1952, Busey entered the United States Navy and attended the basic training at Boot Camp of Naval Station Great Lakes, Illinois. In March 1953, Busey was chosen to Aviation Cadet Training Program at Pensacola, Florida.

During the years 1967, Busey served at various Naval posts, including Naval Air Station Cecil Field or Naval Air Station Jacksonville. In July 1964, Busey attended the Naval Postgraduate School in Monterey, California and earned there his Bachelor of Science and Master of Business Administration degrees.

== Vietnam War ==
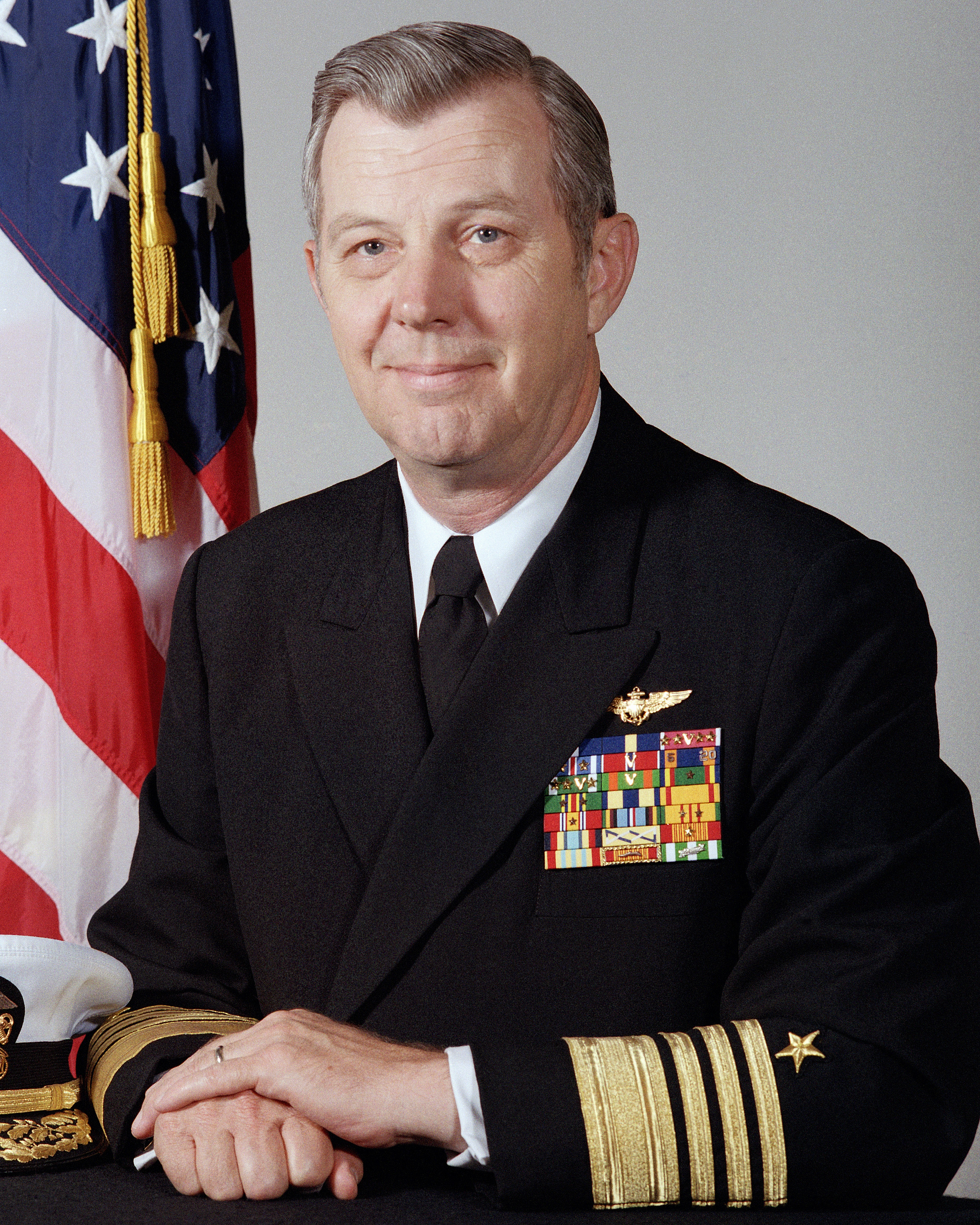
Admiral Busey in May 1986

In January 1967, Busey was transferred to the Attack Squadron 163 ("Saints") and served as a pilot in Vietnam War. During one operation near Hanoi, North Vietnam, Busey commanded a group of six aircraft with the task of bombing the Hanoi thermal power plant. Despite the damage caused to his aircraft by North Vietnamese anti-aircraft fire, Busey regained control of his plane and continued his mission. Busey destroyed the target and returned to USS Oriskany (CV-34). For this action, he received the Navy Cross.

Busey's other decorations from the Vietnam War included the Legion of Merit with "V" Device, three Distinguished Flying Crosses, the Air Medal and a Bronze Star Medal with "V" Device.

== Retirement ==
After retiring from the navy, Busey served as the chief administrator of the Federal Aviation Administration from 1989 to 1991. He then served as United States Deputy Secretary of Transportation from 1991 to 1992. Afterwards, he became a board member at Curtiss-Wright until 2008.

Busey died in Lincoln, California, on April 21, 2023.

== Personal life ==
Busey married Jean L. Cole. Their children are:

- James Buchanan Busey V (1962–2008), chief engineer of unmanned aerial vehicle testing at the Naval Air Test Center, Naval Air Station, Patuxent River, Maryland, and member of the National Transportation Safety Board; with his wife, Charlotte (m. 1992) father of James Buchanan Busey VI and of Jessica Lynn Busey.
- Angela R. B. Busey, married to Michael Presto, of Fresno, California.
- Nancy J. B. Busey, married to Dennis Naumann, of Grass Valley, California.

== Awards ==

Naval Aviator Badge
1st Row	Navy Cross		
2nd Row	Defense Distinguished Service Medal with two bronze oak leaf clusters	Navy Distinguished Service Medal with two gold award stars	Legion of Merit with four Gold Stars and "V" Device
3rd Row	Distinguished Flying Cross with two Gold Stars	Bronze Star Medal with "V" Device	Air Medal with gold award numeral 5 and bronze Strike/flight numeral 20
4th Row	Navy and Marine Corps Commendation Medal with three Gold Stars and "V" Device	Navy and Marine Corps Achievement Medal with "V" Device	Navy Unit Commendation with one bronze service star
5th Row	Navy Meritorious Unit Commendation with two bronze Stars	Navy Expeditionary Medal	China Service Medal
6th Row	National Defense Service Medal with one bronze Star	Armed Forces Expeditionary Medal	Vietnam Service Medal with six service stars
7th Row	Navy Sea Service Deployment Ribbon	Navy Distinguished Service Order 2nd Class	Vietnam Gallantry Cross with one Gold Star
8th Row	Vietnam Armed Forces Honor Medal 1st Class	Vietnam Gallantry Cross Unit Award	Vietnam Campaign Medal

Military offices
Preceded by Ronald J. Hays	Vice Chief of Naval Operations; 1985–1987	Succeeded by Huntington Hardisty
Political offices
Preceded by T. Allan McArtor	Administrator of the Federal Aviation Administration; 1989–1991	Succeeded by Thomas C. Richards
Preceded by Elaine Chao	United States Deputy Secretary of Transportation; 1991–1992	Succeeded by Mortimer L. Downey
