= Jane Holl Lute =

American diplomat and security analyst

Jane Lute
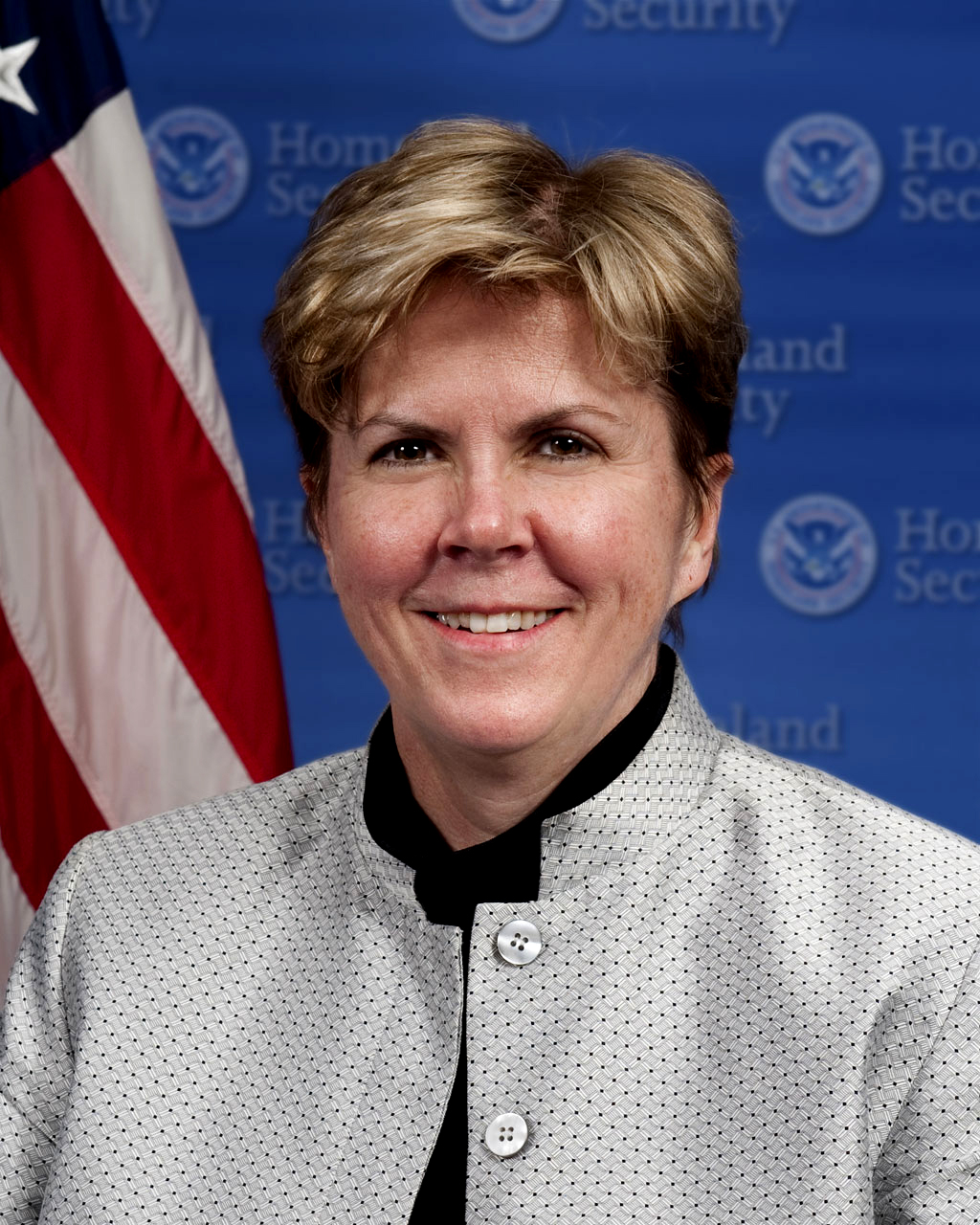

5th United States Deputy Secretary of Homeland Security
- In office April 3, 2009 – April 9, 2013
- President: Barack Obama
- Preceded by: Paul A. Schneider
- Succeeded by: Alejandro Mayorkas

Personal details
- Born: 1956 (age 69–70) New Jersey, U.S.
- Party: Independent
- Spouse: Douglas Lute
- Education: Montclair State University (BA); University of Southern California (MA); Stanford University (PhD); Georgetown University (JD)

Military service
- Allegiance: United States of America
- Branch/service: United States Army
- Years of service: 1978–1994
- Rank: Major
- Battles/wars: Gulf War

Jane Holl Lute (born 1956) is an American diplomat and security analyst who served as the UN special envoy on the Cyprus dispute. She served as the deputy secretary of homeland security from 2009 through 2013, after having been confirmed by the U.S. Senate on April 3, 2009. Previously, Lute was the United Nations assistant secretary-general for peacebuilding support. Before that, she was assistant secretary-general for mission support in the Department of Peacekeeping Operations, beginning in August 2003. She was the president and CEO of the Arlington-based Council on CyberSecurity and senior advisor to Measure, a drone-as-a-service company. On January 5, 2014, she was appointed special adviser for relocation of Camp Hurriya residents outside of Iraq by United Nations Secretary-General Ban Ki-moon. On February 8, 2016, she was appointed special coordinator on improving the United Nations response to sexual exploitation and abuse. In 2020, Lute was elected as a fellow of the National Academy of Public Administration.

== Biography ==
The daughter of the late Adel Schwetz Holl and John F. Holl, of South Orange, Lute graduated from Montclair State University in 1978 and received her commission as a U.S. Army second lieutenant through Seton Hall University's ROTC program. She served in the Gulf War during Operation Desert Storm. In addition, she earned an MA from the University of Southern California in 1985, a PhD in political science from Stanford University in 1989, and a juris doctor from Georgetown University in 2000. She is a member of the Virginia Bar.

From 1991 to 1994, she served as director for European affairs on the National Security Council staff at the White House. Between 1994 and 1999, Lute headed up the Carnegie Commission on Preventing Deadly Conflict and was a senior public policy fellow at the Woodrow Wilson Centre for International Scholars.

Prior to joining the UN Secretariat, Lute served as executive vice president and chief operating officer of the United Nations Foundation and the Better World Fund, which is established to administer Ted Turner's $1 billion contribution to support the goals of the United Nations. Before that, she served as executive director of the Association of the United States Army's project on the role of American military power in 2000.

On January 23, 2009, President Barack Obama announced his intention to nominate Jane Holl Lute as deputy secretary of homeland security. She was confirmed on April 3 of that year. She left the department on April 9, 2013. The undersecretary for National Protection and Programs Directorate Rand Beers was named as her acting replacement.

Since leaving the Obama administration, Lute has joined the Homeland Security Advisory Council and the World Economic Forum's Global Agenda Council on Cyber Security. She is also part of the Atlantic Council's Task Force on a Transatlantic Digital Agenda, a member of the board of directors of the Center for Internet Security, and a member of the board of directors at the George Washington University's Center for Cyber and Homeland Security. Lute also served as a founding partner of Cambridge Global Advisors (CGA), a strategic consulting firm focused on homeland security, national security, and cyber security issues.

Lute is married to Lt. Gen. Douglas E. Lute, who was appointed in 2007 as assistant to the president and deputy national security advisor for Iraq and Afghanistan and served as the United States permanent representative to NATO from September 3, 2013 to January 20, 2017.

Political offices
Preceded by Paul Schneider	United States Deputy Secretary of Homeland Security; 2009–2013	Succeeded by Rand Beers; Acting
