= Paul A. Schneider =

American government official (born 1944)

Paul Schneider
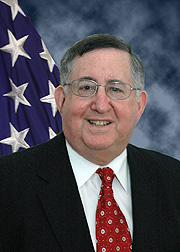

4th United States Deputy Secretary of Homeland Security
- In office June 5, 2008 – February 11, 2009
- President: George W. Bush; Barack Obama
- Preceded by: Michael P. Jackson
- Succeeded by: Jane Holl Lute

Personal details
- Born: Paul Allan Schneider; April 30, 1944 (age 82) New York City, New York, U.S.
- Education: University of Massachusetts Lowell (BS)

Paul Allan Schneider (born April 30, 1944, Brooklyn, New York) is a former United States Deputy Secretary of Homeland Security. He had previously served as the Under Secretary of Homeland Security for Management. He was responsible for all the department's budget, appropriations, expenditure of funds, accounting and finance; procurement; human resources and personnel; information technology systems; facilities, property, equipment, and other material resources; and identification and tracking of performance measurements.

Schneider served as Deputy Secretary for the Department of Homeland Security from June 5, 2008 to February 11, 2009.

Prior to coming to DHS, Schneider served as a defense and aerospace consultant where he led a congressionally directed study for NASA on the costs, risks and benefits of human space flight and a study of open architectures for the U.S. Navy. He led an independent review of the presidential helicopter replacement program, played a role in the administration's effort to develop the plan for the Next Generation Air Transportation System and led reviews of Defense network-centric warfare and interoperability programs. Schneider served as the Senior Acquisition Executive of the National Security Agency (NSA) from October 2002 to September 2003, where he was responsible for oversight and execution of signals intelligence and information security development and acquisition programs.

Schneider served as the Principal Deputy Assistant Secretary of the Navy for Research, Development and Acquisition from July 1998 to September 2002. He was responsible for the oversight and execution of Navy and Marine Corps research, development and acquisition programs with an annual budget in excess of $30 billion. During the administration transition he served as Acting Assistant Secretary of the Navy for Research, Development, and Acquisition from January 21, 2001 to July 16, 2001. From October 1994 to June 1998 Schneider served as the executive director and senior civilian of the Naval Sea Systems Command, the Navy's largest shore organization. In this position, he was responsible for the day-to-day operations of an $18 billion per year, 70,000-person organization, including shipyards, laboratories, and engineering and test facilities.

Schneider began his career in 1965 at the Portsmouth Naval Shipyard in Kittery, Maine, as a project engineer in the Submarine Propulsion and Auxiliary Machinery systems branch. From 1966 to 1981 he served in several positions in submarine design, construction and overhaul programs. His last assignment was managing the Trident ship design and the integration of weapons and combat systems. He also served as program manager for a Submarine Advanced Technology Program. He was appointed to the Senior Executive Service in 1981, when he served as the Deputy Director of NAVSEA'S Auxiliary Systems Sub-Group in the Engineering Directorate. From March 1986 to March 1981, he was the executive director of the Amphibious, Auxiliary, Mine and Sealift Ships Directorate, responsible for ship design, acquisition, maintenance, modernization and life cycle support of these ships. During this period, he also served as program manager for two classified programs. From March 1991 to October 1994, he was the executive director of the Surface Ship Directorate with expanded responsibilities to include aircraft carriers and in-service surface combatants, combat systems, security assistance and foreign military sales and the Navy’s diving and salvage program.

Schneider holds a Bachelor of Science degree in nuclear engineering from the University of Massachusetts Lowell and is a member of the American Society of Naval Engineers (ASNE), the Armed Forces Communications and Electronics Association (AFCEA), the Association of Scientists and Engineers (ASE), the Navy League, the Association of Old Crows and the Naval Institute.

Schneider currently serves on the Board of Managers for the Johns Hopkins Applied Physics Laboratory.

== Awards ==
During his service with the federal government, Schneider has been the recipient of the Department of the Navy Superior Civilian Service Award and the Distinguished Civilian Service Award; the Department of Defense Distinguished Civilian Service Award (twice); and the President's Award for Distinguished Civilian Service. He also received three Presidential Rank Awards.

Political offices
Preceded by Michael P. Jackson	United States Deputy Secretary of Homeland Security; 2007–2009	Succeeded by Jane Holl Lute
