= Huntington Hardisty =

United States admiral

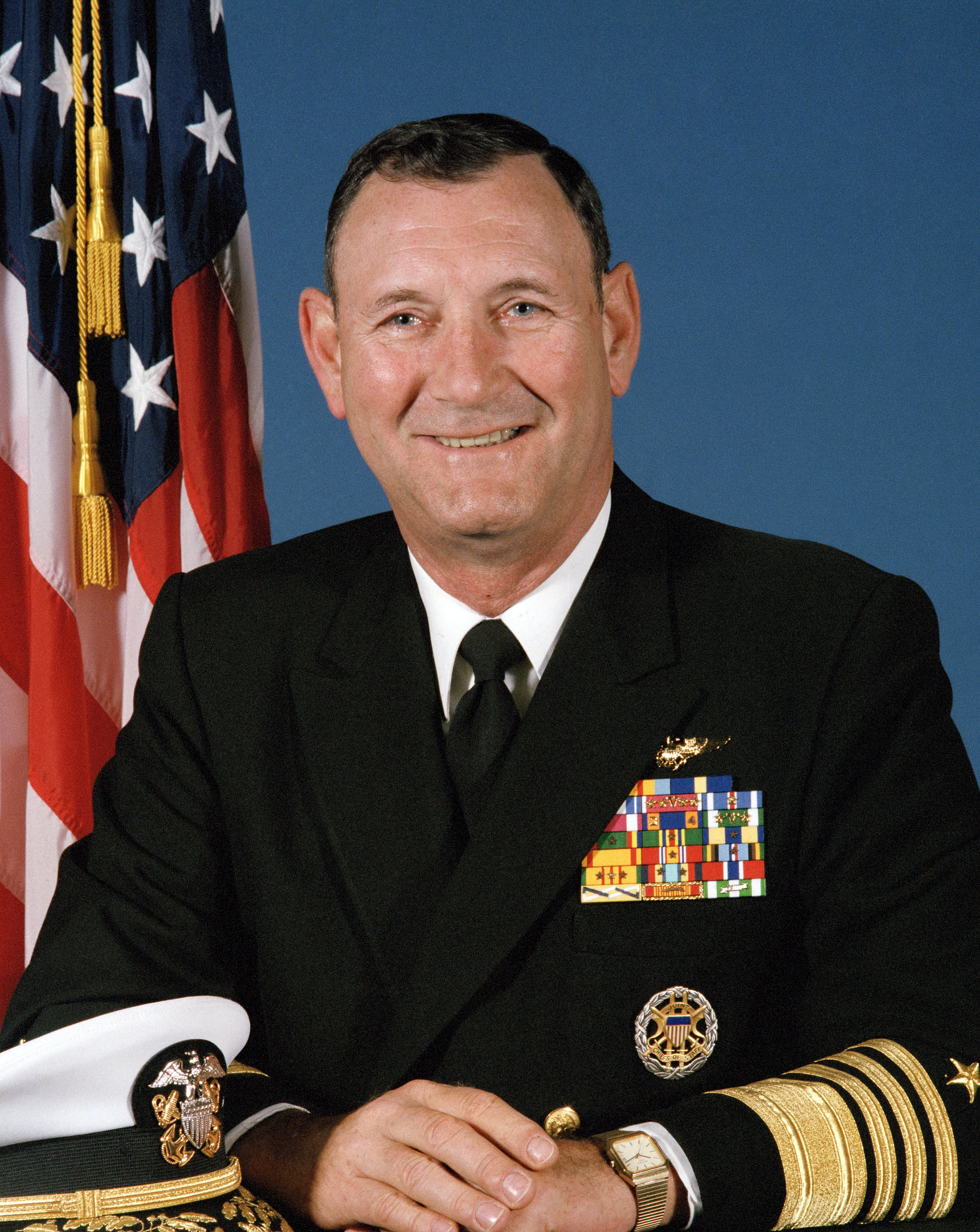
- Admiral Huntington Hardisty
- Born: February 3, 1929
- Died: October 1, 2003 (aged 74); Hartford, Connecticut, U.S.
- Burial place: Arlington National Cemetery
- Military career
- Allegiance: United States
- Branch: United States Navy
- Service years: 1952–1991
- Rank: Admiral
- Nickname: "Hunt"
- Commands: United States Pacific Command; Vice Chief of Naval Operations; U.S. Naval Base Subic Bay; Naval War College; USS Oriskany (CVA-34); USS Savannah (AOR-4); Carrier Air Wing Eleven
- Conflicts: Vietnam War
- Awards: Defense Distinguished Service Medal; Navy Distinguished Service Medal (2); Silver Star; Legion of Merit (5); Distinguished Flying Cross (2)
- Other work: President. Kaman Aerospace

Huntington Hardisty (February 3, 1929 – October 1, 2003) was a United States Navy four star admiral who served as Vice Chief of Naval Operations from 1987 to 1988; and Commander in Chief, United States Pacific Command from 1988 to 1991.

== Early life ==
Hardisty was offered a Major League Baseball contract with the Chicago Cubs but opted for a scholarship to the University of North Carolina. He later transferred to the United States Naval Academy where he played football.

== Naval career ==
After graduation in 1952, Hardisty attended pilot training and earned his wings in 1953. As a test pilot in 1961, he set a low level speed record in an F4H-1 Phantom II of 900 miles per hour at 125 feet above the ground, a record which remained unbroken for 16 years. The actual F4H-1 'Sageburner' is now in storage at the National Air and Space Museum in Washington, D.C.

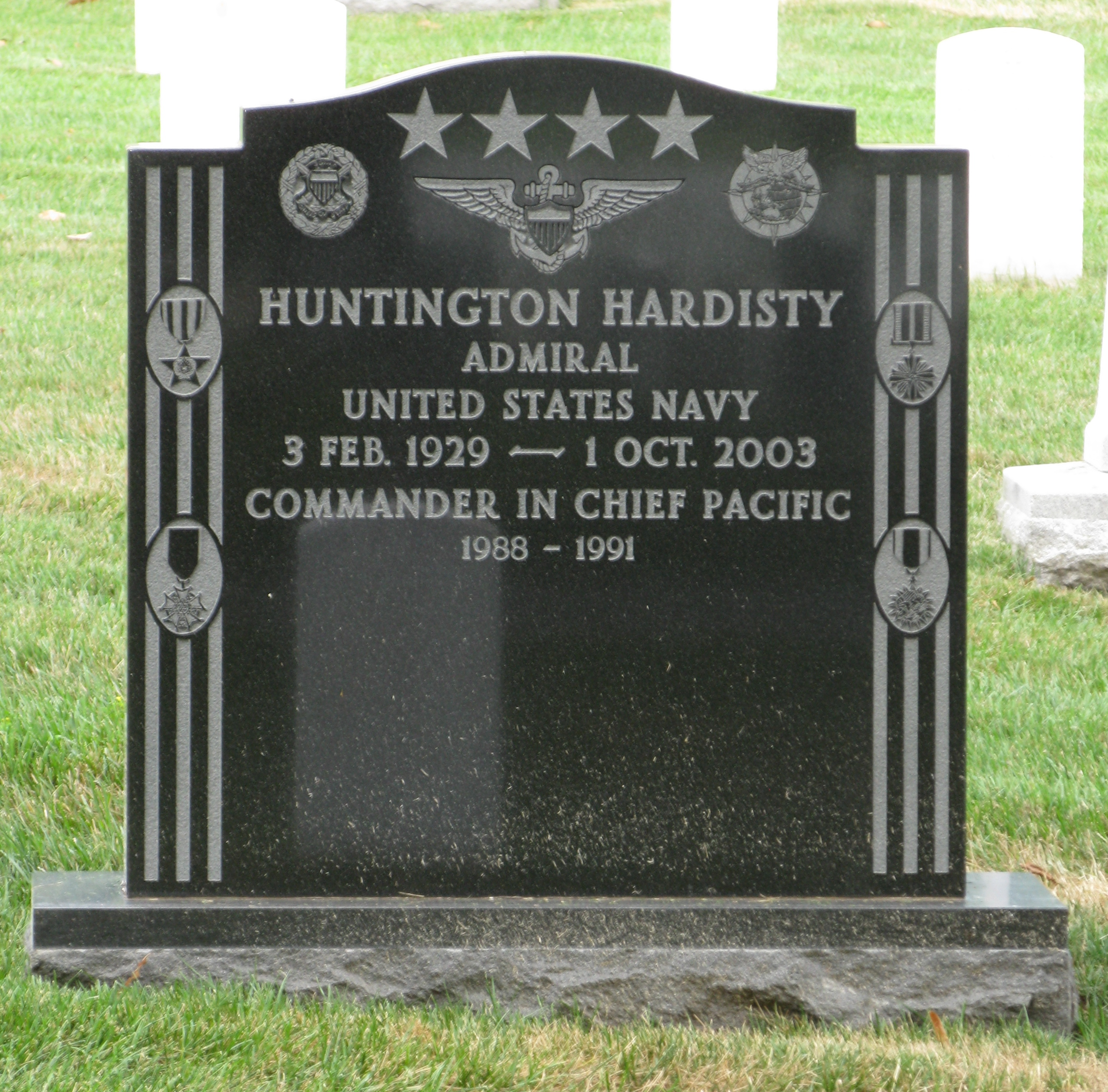
Headstone of Huntington Hardisty at Arlington National Cemetery.

Hardisty's assignments included command of Carrier Air Wing Eleven, USS Savannah (AOR-4) and USS Oriskany (CVA-34). As a flag officer he was President of the Naval War College, commanded the U.S. Naval Base Subic Bay in the Philippines; commanded Carrier Strike Force Seventh Fleet; and served as Director for Operations, Office of the Joint Chiefs of Staff; Deputy and Chief of Staff, United States Pacific Command; Vice Chief of Naval Operations; and Commander in Chief, United States Pacific Command. He also received the Gray Eagle Award.

== Later career ==
Hardisty was one of the technical directors for the movie Hunt for Red October. After retiring from the navy in 1991, Hardisty was a board member of several corporations and served as president of Kaman Aerospace International in Connecticut. He belonged to numerous organizations, including the Association of Naval Aviation, and served as chairman of the U.S. Naval Academy Alumni Association.

Hardisty died on October 1, 2003, in Hartford, Connecticut, at the age of 74. He was later interred on December 5, 2003, in Arlington National Cemetery.

== Awards and decorations ==

Naval Aviator Badge
Defense Distinguished Service Medal		Navy Distinguished Service Medal with one gold award star
Silver Star	Legion of Merit with four award stars and Combat V	Distinguished Flying Cross with award star
Meritorious Service Medal	Air Medal with gold award numeral 3 and bronze strike/flight numeral 4	Navy and Marine Corps Commendation Medal with Combat V and two award stars
Navy Unit Commendation with one bronze service star	Navy Meritorious Unit Commendation with service star	Navy Expeditionary Medal with service star
China Service Medal	National Defense Service Medal with two service stars	Armed Forces Expeditionary Medal with service star
Vietnam Service Medal with seven service stars	Navy Sea Service Deployment Ribbon with two service stars	Philippine Legion of Honor, Chief Commander
Vietnam Navy Distinguished Service Order, 2nd class	Vietnam Gallantry Cross Unit Citation	Vietnam Campaign Medal
Joint Chiefs of Staff Identification Badge
United States Pacific Command Badge

Military offices
Preceded by Julien J. LeBourgeois	President of the Naval War College; 1977–1977	Succeeded by James B. Stockdale
Preceded by James B. Busey IV	Vice Chief of Naval Operations; 1987–1988	Succeeded by Leon A. Edney
