= United States Deputy Secretary of Transportation =

- Seal of the department

- Flag of the deputy secretary

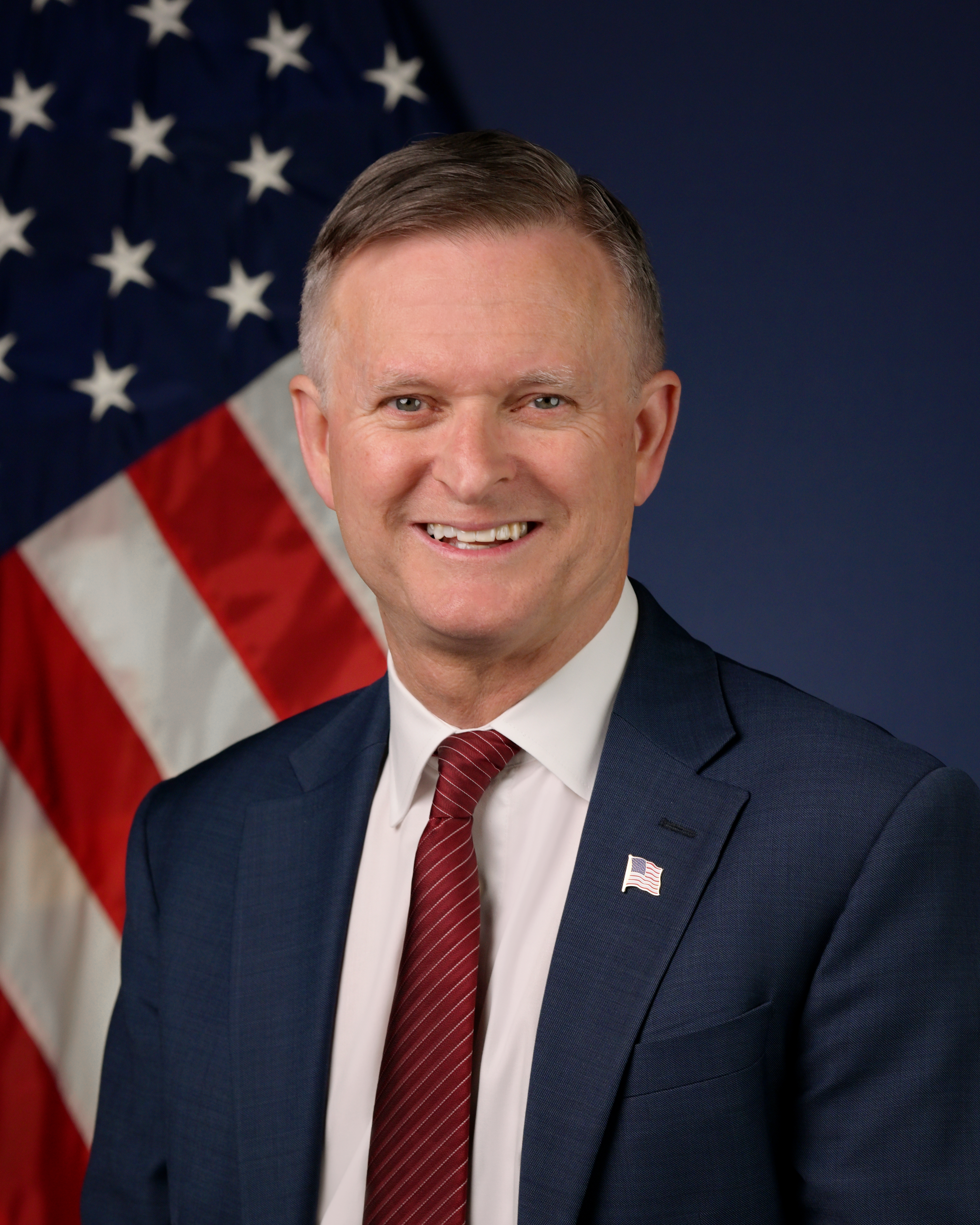
- Incumbent; Steven G. Bradbury since March 13, 2025
- United States Department of Transportation
- Style: Mr. Deputy Secretary
- Reports to: United States Secretary of Transportation
- Seat: Washington, D.C.
- Appointer: The president with Senate advice and consent
- Term length: No fixed term 49 U.S.C. § 102
- First holder: Darrell M. Trent
- Salary: Executive Schedule, level II
- Website: www.transportation.gov

The deputy secretary of transportation advises and assists the secretary of transportation in the supervision and direction of the Department of Transportation (DOT). The deputy secretary would succeed the secretary in their absence, sickness, or unavailability.

== List of deputy secretaries of transportation ==
#	Image	Name	Term began	Term ended	President served
1		Darrell M. Trent	1981	1983	Ronald Reagan
2		James H. Burnley IV	1983	December 3, 1987	Ronald Reagan
3		Mimi Weyforth Dawson	December 3, 1987	January 20, 1989	Ronald Reagan
4		Elaine Chao	April 19, 1989	October 18, 1991	George H. W. Bush
5		James B. Busey IV	December 4, 1991	February 21, 1992	George H. W. Bush
6		Mortimer L. Downey	May 28, 1993	January 20, 2001	Bill Clinton
7		Michael Peter Jackson	May 5, 2001	August 28, 2003	George W. Bush
8		Maria Cino	May 6, 2005	March 3, 2007	George W. Bush
9		Thomas J. Barrett	June 1, 2007	May 1, 2009	George W. Bush; Barack Obama
10		John Porcari	June 1, 2009	December 27, 2013	Barack Obama
11		Victor Mendez	December 27, 2013	July 24, 2014	Barack Obama
11		Victor Mendez	July 24, 2014	January 20, 2017	Barack Obama
12		Jeffrey A. Rosen	May 18, 2017	May 21, 2019	Donald Trump
–		Steven G. Bradbury (acting)	September 10, 2019	January 20, 2021	Donald Trump
13		Polly Trottenberg	April 14, 2021	January 20, 2025	Joe Biden
14		Steven G. Bradbury	March 13, 2025	Incumbent	Donald Trump
