= McConnell Center =

University of Louisville center

The McConnell Center is an academic and leadership development center at the University of Louisville in Louisville, Kentucky. The center was established in 1991 by U.S. Senator Mitch McConnell alongside other U of L alumni.

== History ==
McConnell founded the center on the principle that “Kentucky’s future depends on inspiring talented, motivated leaders”. Its mission emphasizes leadership, scholarship, and service, aiming to recruit and nurture the Commonwealth's brightest young leaders through education and opportunity. The center is not affiliated with any political party, and it has hosted speakers from across the political spectrum. In 2001, the center was criticized for not disclosing donor information. The current chair of the McConnell Center is Dr. Gary L. Gregg II, who has held the position since 2000, succeeding Dr. Paul Weber.

The McConnell Center's mission includes four major components: The McConnell Scholars Program, Public Lecture Series, Civic Education Program, and U.S. Senator Mitch McConnell and Secretary Elaine L. Chao Archives. The core of the McConnell Center is the McConnell Scholarship, offered each year to ten high school seniors from the Commonwealth of Kentucky. These students, selected based upon their high school achievement, are offered tuition scholarships to the University of Louisville, as well as opportunities for travel, internships, meeting with influential policy makers and the opportunity to study abroad.

== McConnell Scholars Program ==
The McConnell Scholars Program is an intensive academic scholarship and leadership initiative for undergraduate students at UofL sponsored by the McConnell Center. Each year, the program selects 10 high-school seniors graduating from Kentucky high schools, identified for their academic achievement and leadership potential. The scholars are offered up to full tuition at the University of Louisville. Scholars participate in mentored studies in leadership, citizenship, and the liberal arts, often under the guidance of the Center's director, Dr. Gary L. Gregg II, and faculty of the university. They are required to maintain strong academics, minor in political science, and to engage actively in Center activities.

Beyond funding their education, the McConnell Scholars Program offers a wide array of unique opportunities designed to cultivate well-rounded future leaders. Scholars benefit from domestic and international travel experiences that broaden their exposure. and encouraged to engage in public service. Throughout their tenure, scholars get to meet and interact with prominent leaders in government, politics, and academia who visit the Center. These personal interactions, often in small group settings, allow students to learn directly from notable national and international figures, building their professional networks and perspectives. The program also fosters a close-knit community and alumni network, which students often participating in activities like a Moot Court team, leadership retreats, and discussion seminars, forging bonds with fellow scholars and alumni mentors.

The impact of this program is evident in its alumni outcomes. Since 1991, the McConnell Center has produced over 250 alumni, many of whom have gone on to significant leadership roles in public service, law, and other fields. Notable alumni include figures such as CNN political contributor Scott Jennings, Kentucky's Secretary of State Michael Adams, and former Kentucky Attorney General Daniel Cameron, among others. These successes underscore the Center's broader aim to equip Kentucky's brightest students with an education and network on par with the nation's elite institutions, enabling them to become impactful civic and political leaders in the Commonwealth and beyond.

== Distinguished speakers ==
The McConnell Center's Distinguished Speaker Series has attracted numerous high-profile leaders from government and international affairs. Since its inception, the series has hosted over 60 influential political figures, including George W. Bush, Joe Biden, and Hillary Clinton, reflecting the Center's commitment to exposing students and the community to a broad range of perspectives.

1. former US Secretary of State George Shultz, Oct. 5, 1993
2. former US Ambassador to Paraguay and El Salvador Robert White, March 24, 1994
3. Israeli Ambassador to the US Itamar Rabinovich, April 25, 1994

== Notable alumni ==
- Scott Jennings – Class of 2000, CNN Contributor
- Michael Adams – Class of 1998, Kentucky Secretary of State (2020–present)
- Daniel Cameron – Class of 2008, Kentucky Attorney general (2019–2024)
- Matt Lehman – Class of 1999, Kentucky House of Representatives (2025–present)
