= Samuel K. Skinner =

White House chief of staff (born 1938)

Sam Skinner
- Official portrait

15th White House Chief of Staff
- In office December 16, 1991 – August 23, 1992
- President: George H. W. Bush
- Deputy: Andrew Card; Henson Moore
- Preceded by: John H. Sununu
- Succeeded by: James Baker

10th United States Secretary of Transportation
- In office February 6, 1989 – December 15, 1991
- President: George H. W. Bush
- Deputy: Elaine Chao
- Preceded by: Jim Burnley
- Succeeded by: Andrew Card

United States Attorney for the Northern District of Illinois
- In office 1975–1977
- President: Gerald Ford
- Preceded by: James R. Thompson
- Succeeded by: Thomas P. Sullivan

Personal details
- Born: Samuel Knox Skinner; June 10, 1938 (age 88) Chicago, Illinois, U.S.
- Party: Republican
- Spouse: Honey Jacobs
- Children: 5, including Jane
- Education: University of Illinois, Urbana-Champaign (BS); DePaul University (JD)

Military service
- Allegiance: United States
- Branch/service: United States Army
- Years of service: 1960–1961
- Rank: Lieutenant

Samuel Knox Skinner (born June 10, 1938) is an American politician, lawyer, and businessman. Skinner served as U.S. Secretary of Transportation and White House Chief of Staff under President George H. W. Bush. Prior to the Bush administration, Skinner served as the United States Attorney for the Northern District of Illinois under President Gerald R. Ford from 1975 to 1977, succeeding James R. Thompson.

== Early life ==
Skinner was born in Chicago, Illinois, on June 10, 1938, the son of Imelda Jane Curran and Vernon Orlo Skinner. He grew up in Springfield, Illinois and Wheaton, Illinois, and graduated from Wheaton Community High School in 1956. He graduated from the University of Illinois in 1960 with a Bachelor of Science in accounting. He was a member of the Pi Kappa Alpha, Beta Eta chapter at the University of Illinois. Upon graduation, he served as a lieutenant and a tank platoon leader in the United States Army in 1960–1961. He graduated from DePaul University Law School in 1966, where he served on the law review. Skinner has been involved in the Boy Scouts most of his life, earning the Eagle Scout award as a youth in Wheaton's Troop 35, and being honored with the Distinguished Eagle Scout Award and Silver Buffalo Award as an adult.

After his military service, Skinner held various sales and management positions with the IBM Corporation from 1960 to 1968. In 1967, IBM selected him Outstanding Salesman of the Year. Although offered position to serve as assistant to the chairman of IBM, Thomas Watson Jr., Skinner decided to enter a career in public service.

== Law career ==
From 1968 to 1975, Skinner served in the office of the United States Attorney for the Northern District of Illinois as an assistant United States attorney (AUSA) and, in 1975, President Gerald Ford appointed the 37-year-old Skinner the United States Attorney. As an AUSA, Skinner fought organized crime and public corruption. In 1973, Skinner worked on the prosecution of then-U.S. Circuit Court of Appeals Judge Otto Kerner, Jr. under James R. Thompson, then United States Attorney for the Northern District of Illinois and a future Governor of Illinois. Kerner was convicted on 17 counts of bribery and conspiracy and sentenced to three years in prison.

This was the first time in U.S. history that a sitting federal court of appeals judge was found guilty of a federal crime. During his tenure at the U.S. Attorney's office, Skinner also worked directly with future U.S. Court of Appeals Judges William J. Bauer, Joel M. Flaum, and Ilana Rovner, U.S. District Court Judge Charles P. Kocoras, future U.S. Attorneys for the Northern District of Illinois Dan K. Webb and Anton R. Valukas, future United States Senator Carol Moseley Braun, and future Illinois Attorney General Tyrone C. Fahner.

From 1977 to 1989, Skinner practiced law as a senior partner in the Chicago law firm Sidley Austin LLP, where he served on the firm's executive committee and as its second lateral partner in its 100-year-old history. From 1984 to 1988, while practicing law full-time, he also served as chairman of the regional transportation authority of northeastern Illinois, the nation's second-largest mass-transportation district. Also during that time, President Reagan appointed Skinner as vice chairman of the President's Commission on Organized Crime.

== George H. W. Bush administration ==
After leaving the U.S. Attorney's office for a career in the private sector, Skinner became active in Republican politics in Illinois. Skinner led the Illinois efforts of George H. W. Bush's unsuccessful 1980 presidential campaign and successful 1988 presidential campaign, the last time a Republican candidate for president carried Illinois in the general election.

In December 1988, Skinner was nominated by President Bush to serve as Secretary of Transportation. Skinner was confirmed unanimously by the United States Senate on January 31, 1989, and assumed the office on February 6, 1989.

As Secretary of Transportation, Skinner served as chief executive officer of a cabinet-level federal department with a budget over $30 billion and a workforce of 105,000 people. During his tenure, Skinner was credited with numerous successes, including the development of the President's National Transportation Policy and the passage of landmark aviation and surface-transportation legislation. He also issued regulations mandating wheelchair lifts on buses. In addition, Skinner was instrumental in developing President Bush's Intermodal Surface Transportation Efficiency Act, which served as the catalyst for the whole ITS industry.

He also developed the "open skies" policy of the United States that liberalized U.S. international policy and significantly increased the number of international flights to and from the U.S. In addition, Skinner acted as the President's point person in numerous crisis situations, including the Eastern Air Lines strike, the Exxon Valdez oil spill, the northern California earthquake, Hurricane Hugo, and the 1991 national rail strike. Skinner's role in these emergencies earned him the moniker "the Master of Disaster". Washingtonian magazine twice gave Skinner its highest ranking for his performance as Secretary of Transportation.

After Dick Thornburgh resigned as Attorney General in 1991 to run for the U.S. Senate seat left vacant by the death of John Heinz, Skinner was offered the position. However, he turned down the role due to the inability of the Attorney General to engage in election-related political activity per the Hatch Act of 1939. In December 1991, Skinner left his job as Secretary of Transportation to replace John H. Sununu as White House Chief of Staff.

As White House Chief of Staff, Skinner acted as the President's chief surrogate and led the implementation of the President's domestic policy agenda leading into the 1992 general election. Under Sununu, domestic policy initiatives had drifted into the background in favor of foreign policy centered around the Persian Gulf War. Skinner served in the position from December 1991 until August 1992, when he was asked to work on the campaign full-time at the Republican National Committee and was replaced as chief of staff by then-Secretary of State James Baker.

== Post-Bush administration career ==
Upon leaving the White House, Skinner returned to Chicago and became president of Commonwealth Edison and its holding company Unicom Corporation (now Exelon) from 1993 to 1998. In 1998, Skinner left this role to become co-chairman of the Chicago-based law firm Hopkins & Sutter. In July 2000, he was named chairman, president, and CEO of US Freightways, retiring from that role three years later in April 2003.

Skinner is currently on the board of directors of Navigant Consulting, Echo Global Logistics, Virgin America, and the Chicago Board of Options Exchange, and an advisor to Metalmark Capital. He also serves as director emeritus of Express Scripts. In 2015, Skinner was appointed chairman of the Takata Corporation independent quality assurance panel to conduct an internal investigation of the company's airbag manufacturing process.

Since 2006, Skinner has served as of counsel at the law firm of Greenberg Traurig. From 2003 to 2008, Skinner was an adjunct professor of management and strategy at the Kellogg School of Management at Northwestern University. He serves on the board of visitors of the Duke University Sanford School of Public Policy. Mayor Lori Lightfoot appointed Skinner to lead the task force to assist the City in its efforts to recover from the economic consequences of COVID-19.

== Family ==
Skinner and his first wife, Susan Ann Thomas, had three children. His eldest son, Thomas Vernon Skinner, is the former head of the U.S. Environmental Protection Agency's national compliance program, director of the EPA's region 5, and current general counsel of Louisiana State University. Another son, Steven Knox Skinner, is the CEO of KemperSports, a privately owned company that manages over 100 golf courses across the country. His daughter, Jane Skinner Goodell, is a former news anchor on Fox News Channel's Happening Now and the wife of NFL Commissioner Roger Goodell.

Skinner currently resides in Winnetka, Illinois, with his wife, Honey Jacobs Skinner, a retired partner at the law firm Sidley Austin LLP. Together, they have two sons, Samuel Jacobs Skinner and William Curran Skinner. Actress Gillian Jacobs is his niece through marriage.

== Awards ==
Skinner has been awarded honorary degrees from George Washington University and Lake Forest College.

In 2017, he was inducted as a laureate of the Lincoln Academy of Illinois and awarded the Order of Lincoln (the state's highest honor) by the governor of Illinois in the areas of government and law.

Political offices
Preceded by James H. Burnley IV	United States Secretary of Transportation; 1989–1991	Succeeded by Andrew Card
Preceded by John H. Sununu	White House Chief of Staff; 1991–1992	Succeeded by James Baker
U.S. order of precedence (ceremonial)
Preceded by Nicholas F. Brady as Former U.S. Cabinet Member	Order of precedence of the United States as Former U.S. Cabinet Member	Succeeded by Louis W. Sullivan as Former U.S. Cabinet Member
