= James H. Burnley IV =

American politician

Jim Burnley
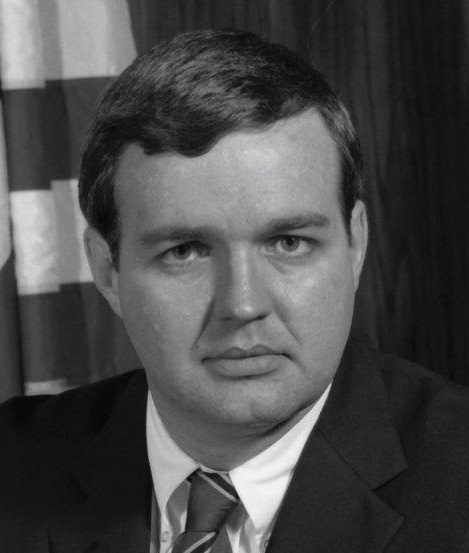
- Burnley as Transportation Secretary

9th United States Secretary of Transportation
- In office December 3, 1987 – January 20, 1989
- President: Ronald Reagan
- Preceded by: Elizabeth Dole
- Succeeded by: Samuel K. Skinner

2nd United States Deputy Secretary of Transportation
- In office 1983 – December 3, 1987
- President: Ronald Reagan
- Preceded by: Darrell Trent
- Succeeded by: Mimi Weyforth Dawson

Personal details
- Born: James Horace Burnley IV; July 30, 1948 (age 77) High Point, North Carolina, U.S.
- Party: Republican
- Spouse: Virginia Johnson
- Children: 4
- Education: Yale University (BA); Harvard University (JD)

James Horace Burnley IV (born July 30, 1948) is an American politician and lawyer. He served as the United States Secretary of Transportation from 1987 until 1989, during the administration of President Ronald Reagan. He is a partner at Venable LLP in Washington, D.C.

== Early life ==
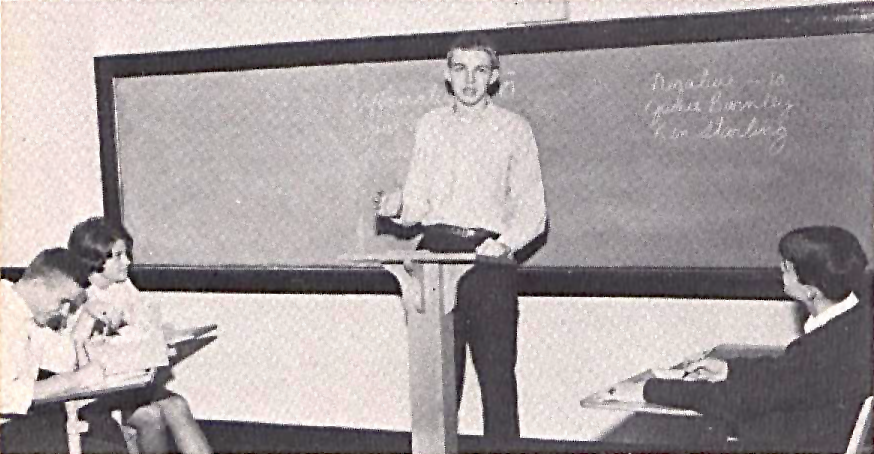
Burnley speaking on the debate team during his junior year at High Point Central

Burnley was born in High Point, North Carolina, on July 30, 1948, to Dorothy Mary (Rockwell) and James H. Burnley III. He attended High Point Central High School from 1963 to 1966 and participated in the school's debate team in the National Forensic League. According to The New York Times, he was the only member of the team to earn a double ruby, the highest medal.

He matriculated to Yale University and graduated with a Bachelor of Arts, magna cum laude in 1970. He received his Juris Doctor from Harvard University in 1973.

== Administration ==
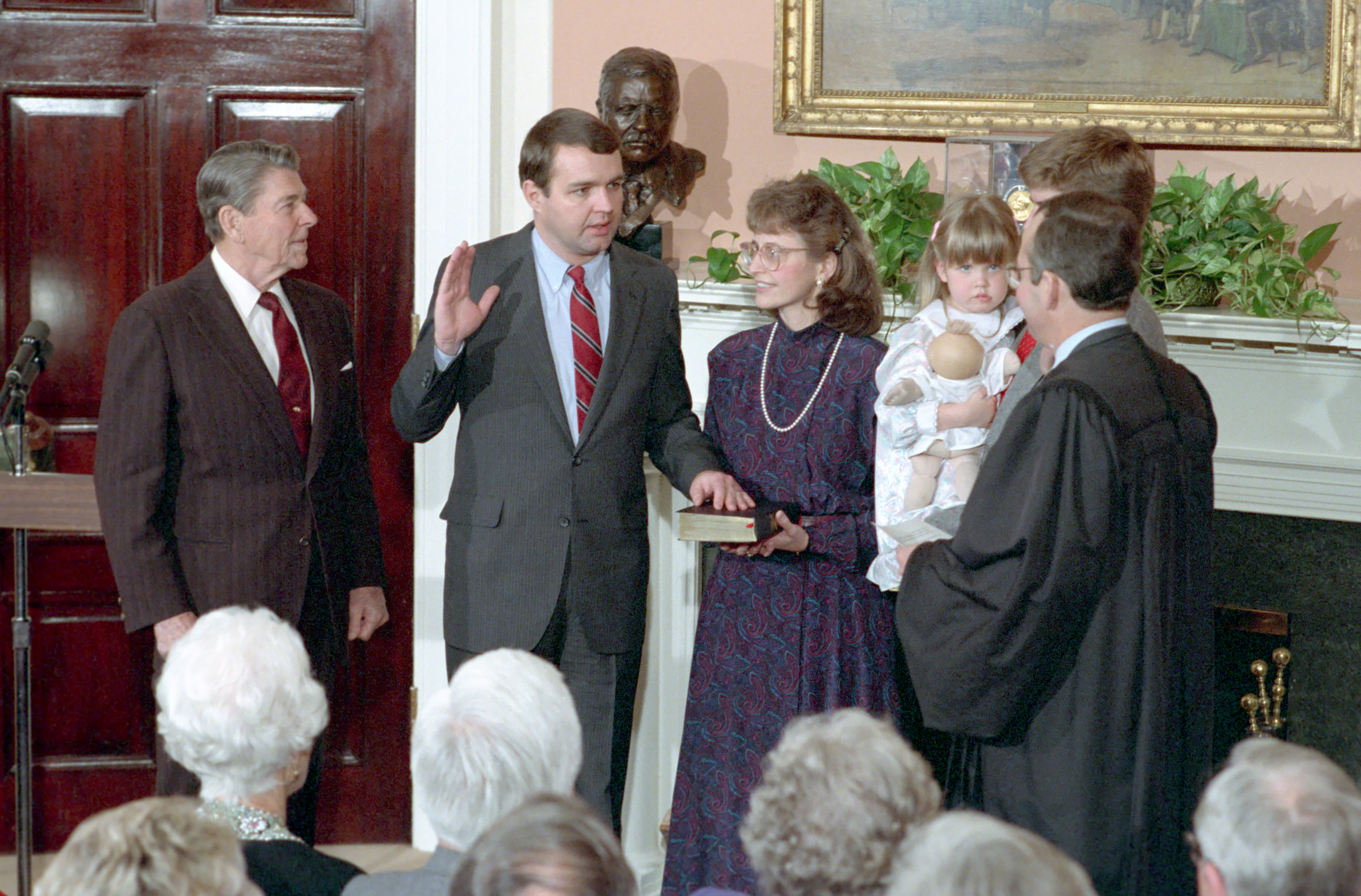
Burnley being sworn in by Ken Starr

In 1987, President Ronald Reagan chose Burnley, Dole's Deputy Secretary and the Department's former General Counsel, to be the nation's ninth Secretary of Transportation. Burnley served as Secretary of Transportation from 1987 to 1989. While number two at DOT, Burnley played a key role in negotiating the sale of Conrail, enabling the transfer of the Washington airports to a regional authority, and helped to assemble an ATC work force in the wake of the 1981 PATCO strike. He also helped to produce the department's policies on aviation safety and security. While Secretary, Burnley emphasized programs to eliminate drug use by issuing regulations requiring drug tests for employees in safety or security-sensitive positions in transportation-related industries. He also set up policies to encourage greater private-sector participation in meeting transportation needs, and supported Coast Guard efforts to upgrade equipment and facilities. In 1988, while Secretary, Burnley directed an investigation into Texas Air Corporation, and its subsidiaries, Continental Airlines and Eastern Airlines. Due to indications of increasing financial pressures at both carriers and FAA findings underlying a substantial proposed fine of Eastern Airlines, Burnley ordered an unprecedented review of the economic fitness and compliance with safety regulations of both major airlines. The review concluded that Texas Air and the two subsidiaries still met the DOT's economic fitness criteria.

As to Eastern Airlines, the review determined that the acrimonious relationships between the company and its unions increased the risk that safety could be jeopardized. Burnley appointed former Secretary of Labor Bill Brock to "try to build the lines of communication and cooperation inside the company that are essential to safety." Burnley also served as General Counsel of the Department of Transportation in 1983.

Prior to his years with the USDOT, Burnley served as associate deputy attorney general for the United States Department of Justice from 1982 to 1983 and as director of the VISTA Program from 1981 to 1982.

== Political activities ==
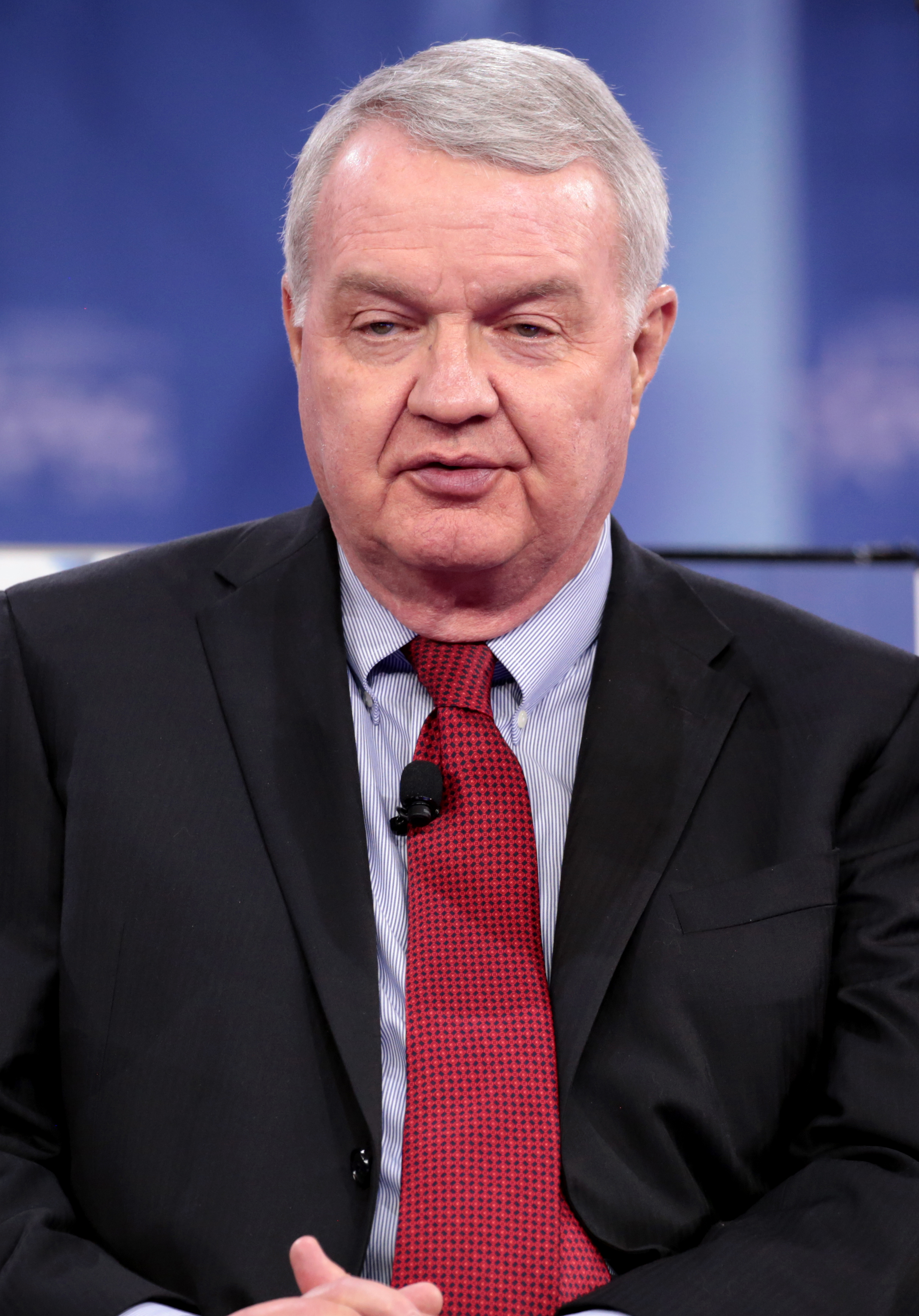
Burnley in 2018

Burnley was the Senior Domestic Policy Advisor to Elizabeth Dole's presidential campaign, as well as a senior advisor to Robert J. Dole during his 1996 presidential race. He served on the transportation transition team for the George W. Bush administration. He also advised John McCain's Presidential campaign on transportation issues.

== Legal career ==
Burnley is a partner at Venable LLP in Washington, D.C. His practice is focused on government relations and regulatory and legislative affairs with a concentration in transportation matters.

== Board affiliations ==
Burnley holds several board affiliations in the transportation industry. He is board chair of the Eno Center for Transportation. He served as the vice chairman of the board of commissioners of the Virginia Port Authority for five years, and also served on the board of directors of Infrasoft, Inc., which produced software for the engineering industry. He was chairman of the Port Study Panel of the National Chamber of Commerce Foundation. He is also a member of the business advisory committee of the Transportation Center at Northwestern University. He served on the board of directors for MTA Safety Training Systems, a company involved in truck driver training, until the sale of the companies. He is a trustee and former chairman of the Jamestown Foundation and also a past chairman of the Intercollegiate Studies Institute. He is a member of the Washington Legal Foundation's Legal Policy Advisory Board.

Political offices
Preceded by Elizabeth Dole	United States Secretary of Transportation; 1987–1989	Succeeded by Samuel K. Skinner
U.S. order of precedence (ceremonial)
Preceded by Edwin Meese as Former U.S. Cabinet Member	Order of precedence of the United States as Former U.S. Cabinet Member	Succeeded by Nicholas F. Brady as Former U.S. Cabinet Member
