= Gary L. Gregg =

Gary L. Gregg II
- Born: October 2, 1967 (age 58)
- Education: Davis and Elkins College (B.A) Miami University (M.A, PhD)
- Scientific career
- Fields: Political scientist
- Workplaces: University of Louisville
- Website: www.dr2g.com

Gary L. Gregg II (born October 2, 1967), holds the Mitch McConnell chair in leadership at the University of Louisville and is director of the McConnell Center. He is the author or editor of several books including The Presidential Republic, Patriot Sage: George Washington and the American Political Tradition, and Securing Democracy – Why We Have an Electoral College, which will be coming out in an updated version soon. He is a teacher and has been the national director of the Intercollegiate Studies Institute.

== Education ==
Gregg holds a M. A. and a Ph.D. from Miami University, Oxford, Ohio, granted in 1991 and 1994 respectively. Before that, he obtained a B. A. Cum Laude at the Davis and Elkins College in Elkins, West Virginia in 1990.

== Selected bibliography ==
=== Books ===
- Gregg II, Gary L. (1997). The presidential republic: executive representation and deliberative democracy. Lanham, Maryland: Rowman & Littlefield Publishers. ISBN 9780847683789.
- Gregg II, Gary L.; Spalding, Matthew (1999). Patriot sage: George Washington and the American political tradition. Wilmington, Delaware: ISI Books. ISBN 9781882926381.
- Gregg II, Gary L. (1999). Vital remnants: America's founding and the Western tradition. Wilmington, Delaware: ISI Books. ISBN 9781882926312.
- Gregg II, Gary L.; Rozell, Mark J. (2004). Considering the Bush presidency. New York: Oxford University Press. ISBN 9780195166804.
- Gregg II, Gary L. (2005). Thinking about the presidency: documents and essays from the founding to the present. Lanham, Maryland: Rowman & Littlefield. ISBN 9780742543379.
- Gregg II, Gary L. (2008). Securing democracy why we have an electoral college (2nd ed.). Wilmington, Delaware: ISI Books. ISBN 9781933859477. OCLC 234109155.
- Gregg II, Gary L. (editor); McConnell, Mitch (editor); Lodge, Henry Cabot (author); Roosevelt, Theodore (author) (2011). Hero tales from American history. Louisville, Kentucky: Butler Books. ISBN 9781935497387. OCLC 825067747.
- Gregg II, Gary L.; Hall, Mark D. (2012). America's forgotten founders (2nd ed.). Wilmington, Delaware: ISI Books. ISBN 9781610170239.

=== Children's books ===
- Gregg, G.L. (2011). The Iona Conspiracy: the remnant chronicles III. Cheshire, Connecticut: Winged Lion Press. ISBN 9781936294145.
- Gregg, G.L. (2007). The Sporran: the remnant chronicles I and II. Louisville, Kentucky: Butler Books. ISBN 9781884532887.
