= Douglas Lute =

American retired general

Lieutenant General Douglas Lute
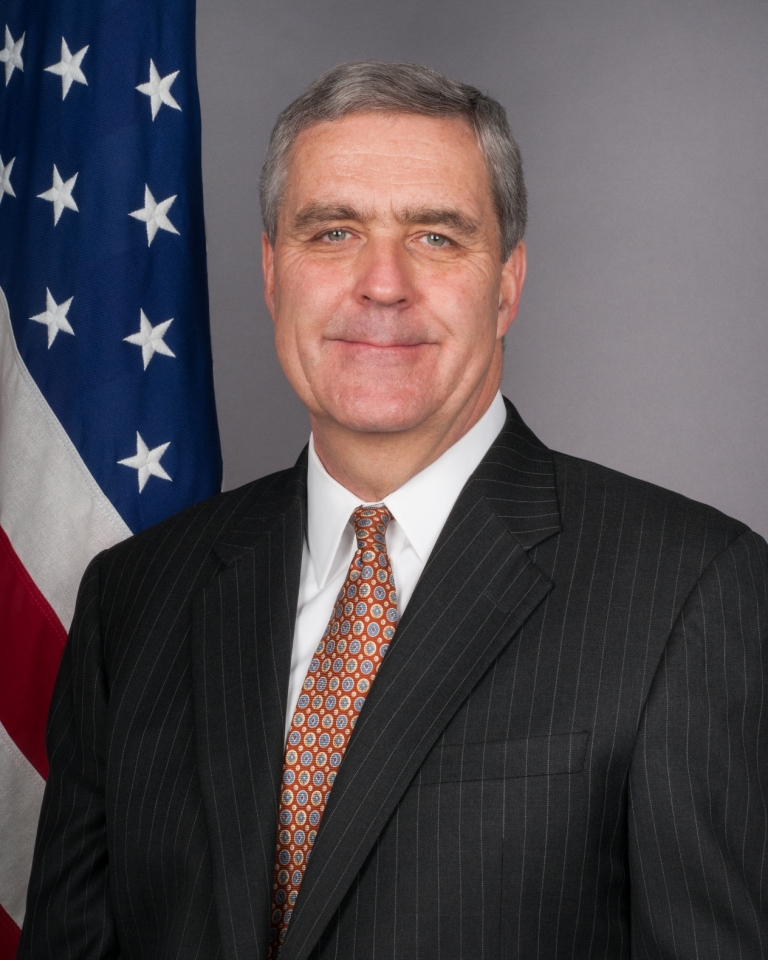

23rd United States Ambassador to NATO
- In office September 3, 2013 – January 20, 2017
- President: Barack Obama
- Preceded by: Ivo H. Daalder
- Succeeded by: Kay Bailey Hutchison

United States Deputy National Security Advisor for Iraq and Afghanistan
- In office May 15, 2007 – September 3, 2013
- President: George W. Bush; Barack Obama
- Preceded by: Position established
- Succeeded by: Position abolished

Personal details
- Born: November 3, 1952 (age 73) Michigan City, Indiana, U.S.
- Spouse: Jane Holl
- Education: United States Military Academy (BS); Harvard Kennedy School (MPA)

Military service
- Allegiance: United States
- Branch/service: United States Army
- Years of service: 1975–2010
- Rank: Lieutenant General
- Awards: Defense Superior Service Medal (4); Legion of Merit (2); Bronze Star Medal

Lt. Gen. Douglas Edward Lute (born November 3, 1952) is a retired United States Army lieutenant general and public servant who served as the United States permanent representative to NATO from 2013 to 2017. He was nominated for the post by President Obama on May 23, 2013, confirmed by the Senate on August 1, 2013, via voice vote, and assumed his position on September 3, 2013.

On May 15, 2007, Lute was appointed by George W. Bush to serve as assistant to the president and deputy national security advisor for Iraq and Afghanistan. The New York Times referred to him as the "war czar," since he occupied a senior advisory position responsible for overseeing the wars in Iraq and Afghanistan. He was asked to stay on by new President Barack Obama as Obama's special assistant and senior coordinator for Afghanistan and Pakistan. After leaving active duty in 2010, Lute remained in his position on the National Security Staff. He is married to Jane Holl Lute, who was the deputy secretary of homeland security from 2009 to 2013.

== Education ==
Lute was born in Michigan City, Indiana, on November 3, 1952. He graduated from the United States Military Academy at West Point in 1975. His first assignment was to the 2nd Armored Cavalry Regiment in Bindlach, Germany, where he commanded C Troop. He earned a MPA degree from Harvard Kennedy School at Harvard University in 1983 and taught in the Department of Social Science at West Point.

== Second Cavalry ==
Following attendance at the British Army Staff College, he returned to the 2nd Armored Cavalry Regiment as operations officer, serving both at the squadron and regimental levels. In 1990–91 he deployed and fought with the regiment in Operation Desert Storm, and later served on the staff of the chief of staff of the United States Army.

== Advancement ==
Lute commanded 1st Squadron, 7th Cavalry at Fort Hood, Texas, in 1992–94. He then served on the Joint Staff in the J-5 Directorate for Strategic Plans and Policy, and held a War College Fellowship at the Atlantic Council in Washington, D.C.

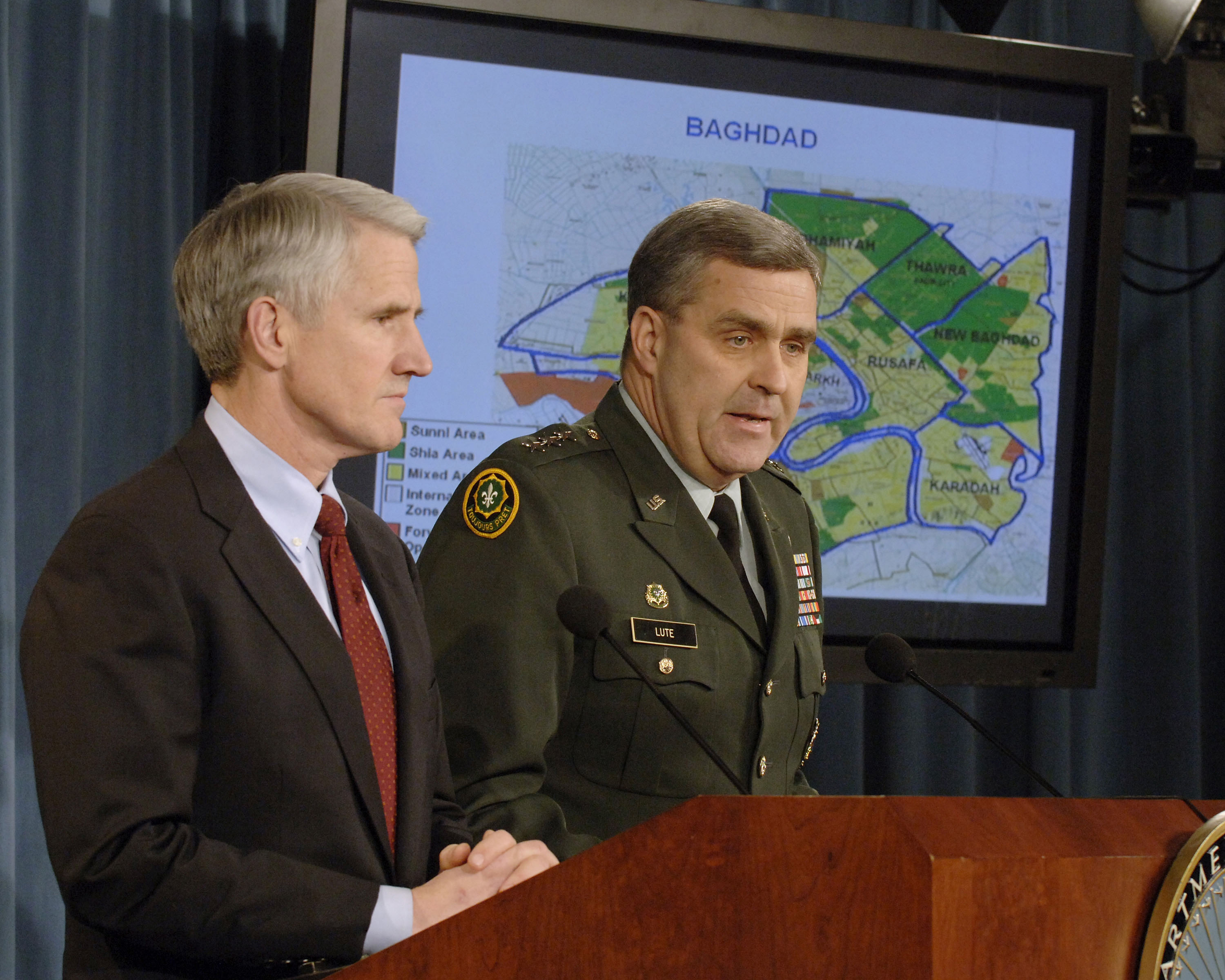
Lt. Gen. Lute and Deputy Assistant Secretary of Defense for Middle East Mark Kimmitt conduct a press briefing, February 9, 2007.

From 1998 to 2000 he commanded the Second Cavalry Regiment, part of XVIII Airborne Corps, at Fort Polk, Louisiana. In 2001, he was appointed brigadier general. He served next as the executive assistant to the chairman of the Joint Chiefs of Staff for fourteen months before joining the 1st Infantry Division in Schweinfurt, Germany, as the assistant division commander (support). He commanded Multinational Brigade East in Kosovo for six months in 2002 before being assigned to United States European Command in January 2003 as the deputy director of operations.

In June 2004, Lute began more than two years as director of operations (J-3) at United States Central Command (USCENTCOM), during which he oversaw combat operations in Iraq and Afghanistan as well as other operations in the Middle East, Central Asia, and the Horn of Africa. He was appointed to the rank of major general in 2004, and to the rank of lieutenant general in 2006. He assumed the duties of director of operations of the Pentagon's Joint Staff in September 2006.

== National Security Council ==
On June 28, 2007, the Senate confirmed Lute to serve as the deputy national security advisor. He remained in the position after his retirement from active duty in 2010.

On 10 August 2007, Lute stated that the United States should "consider" reinstating the military draft to relieve the "stressed" volunteer service from multiple tours of duty. This was immediately followed by a comment that it would be a major policy shift and that he did not see a current need for a draft.

== Awards and decorations ==
During his military career he received:

- Defense Superior Service Medal (with 3 Oak Leaf Clusters)
- Legion of Merit (with Oak Leaf Cluster)
- Bronze Star Medal
- Defense Meritorious Service Medal
- Meritorious Service Medal (with 4 Oak Leaf Clusters)
- Joint Service Commendation Medal
- Army Commendation Medal (with 2 Oak Leaf Clusters)
- Army Achievement Medal
- Parachutist Badge
- Ranger Tab
- Office of the Secretary of Defense Identification Badge
- Joint Chiefs of Staff Identification Badge
- Army Staff Identification Badge

== Lobbying ==
In January 2021, Lute joined BGR Group to chair its international and defense practices.

Diplomatic posts
Preceded by Ivo Daalder	United States Ambassador to NATO; 2013–2017	Succeeded by Kay Bailey Hutchison
