= Progress Kentucky =

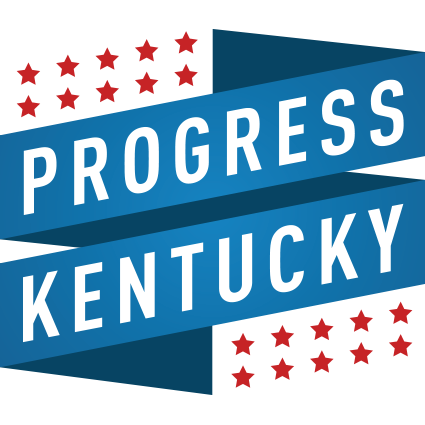
Logo used by Progress Kentucky

Progress Kentucky was an independent expenditure political action committee (PAC) opposing the re-election of Mitch McConnell. The SuperPAC was formed in December 2012. Progress Kentucky's slogan was a play on Senator Mitch McConnell's 2010 statement setting the Republican Party's agenda for last two years of the first term of President Barack Obama:

"The single most important thing we want to achieve: Electing a new US Senator to represent Kentucky."

Progress Kentucky was founded by Kentuckians in order to collect and spend money from donors on traditional media, new media, as well as organizing a grassroots ground game which includes direct actions.

As per FEC rules established in the wake of the Citizens United Supreme Court decision, the group was legally prohibited from coordinating with any candidate or candidate committee.

On January 18, 2013, Progress Kentucky protested outside a McConnell speaking engagement at a Commerce Lexington luncheon, with the theme "He's no fiscal cliff hero."

In February 2013, Progress Kentucky drew criticism for tweets sent suggesting that the Senator Mitch McConnell's wife Elaine Chao's Chinese roots have led him to embrace anti-American policies. Progress Kentucky later apologized for the claims.

On April 11, 2013, WFPL, the NPR affiliate in Louisville, KY, announced that a Louisville area Democrat, Jacob Conway, alleged that two people affiliated with Kentucky Progress, Shawn Reilly & Curtis Morrison, recorded a strategy session of Senator Mitch McConnell (R) while standing in the hallway. Morrison, who had ceased volunteering for Progress Kentucky in February, took complete responsibility for making the recording in an essay he published in Salon the following month writing "Shawn never wanted me to release the recording, and our friendship ended in the wake of that disagreement." On August 27, 2014, WHAS political blogger Joe Arnold said there is the appearance of no criminal charges being filed against Morrison.

In August 2013, it was announced that Progress Kentucky would shut down due to a lack of fundraising, as well as controversy caused by the recording incident.
