= Mimi Weyforth Dawson =

American politician

United States Deputy Secretary of Transportation
- In office December 3, 1987 – January 20, 1989
- President: Ronald Reagan
- Preceded by: James H. Burnley IV
- Succeeded by: Elaine Chao

Commissioner of the Federal Communications Commission
- In office July 6, 1981 – December 3, 1987
- President: Ronald Reagan
- Preceded by: Robert E. Lee
- Succeeded by: Alfred C. Sikes

Personal details
- Born: Mary Ann Weyforth Dawson; August 31, 1944 (age 80); St. Louis, Missouri, U.S.
- Political party: Republican

Mimi Weyforth Dawson (born August 31, 1944) is an American political aide who served as a Commissioner of the Federal Communications Commission from 1981 to 1987 and as the United States Deputy Secretary of Transportation from 1987 to 1989.
