= Darby Mine No. 1 disaster =

2006 mining disaster in Kentucky, United States

Coordinates: 36.875833°N 82.952777°W

- Overturned personnel carrier near the No. 4 entry.
- Date: May 20, 2006
- Time: Approximately 1 a.m.
- Location: Darby Mine No. 1 near Harlan in Harlan County, Kentucky
- Cause: "critical safety standards were violated"
- Deaths: Five men

The Darby Mine No. 1 disaster in Harlan County, Kentucky, United States, on May 20, 2006, killed five miners and left one survivor.

== Cause of the explosion ==
As reported in a May 23, 2006 story in The Courier-Journal, titled "Investigator thinks methane to blame for Darby mine explosion" by Deborah Yetter and Tom Loftus, at a news conference in Holmes Mill, Kentucky on May 22, 2006, Chuck Wolfe, spokesman for Kentucky's Environmental and Public Protection Cabinet announced that investigators entered the mine for the first time since the explosion on May 22. 2006. He said that Tracy Stumbo, chief investigator at the Kentucky Office of Mine Safety and Licensing, was "pretty satisfied it was a methane explosion...Our chief investigator said he had no reason to think coal dust was a factor".

Kentucky Governor Ernie Fletcher told reporters on May 22, as he left the Capitol to attend funeral visitation for the victims, "I think we have a preliminary cause right now, and that's an explosion that occurred from a contained area that apparently was leaking...That's why we went about setting a new protocol to check all of the non-conventional containment procedures. So we're fairly confident that is where the explosion began".

Asked whether the seals would be banned, Fletcher replied, "I would not go that far at this time. But I think it does certainly behoove us to check the integrity of these non-conventional seals and make sure they are, in fact, working as they should....It's a substantial number and it could have a tremendous impact on coal mining if there was a systemic problem that was determined regarding these non-conventional seals".

== Background of the operator ==
John D. North and Ralph Napier owned and controlled the mine when the disaster occurred, and the mine had delinquent fines from the Mine Safety and Health Administration when the disaster occurred. Delinquent fines against Kentucky Darby after the accident stood at $593,107, but the men had eight other companies with $2.3 million in delinquent fines spread over eight other companies that they control together or separately.

As of September 2014, Mine Safety and Health News (www.minesafety.com) and National Public Radio reported in a partnership story that MSHA penalties for the 2006 mine disaster remained unpaid, along with fines for violations at the other operations. While the mines are now closed, Kentucky state records show that Ralph Napier, with his son, had registered a new mining company.

Under the 1977 Mine Act, MSHA may not close a mine for penalties unpaid for mining violations. An operator (individual or company) is free to go an open another mine, or keep operating the mine where delinquent penalties prevail.
