= Mortimer L. Downey =

American government official (1936–2023)

Mort Downey
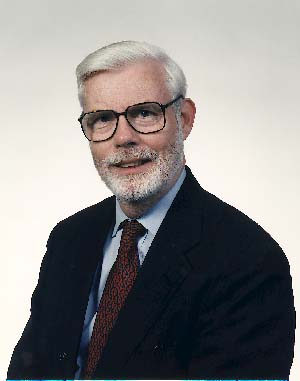

6th United States Deputy Secretary of Transportation
- In office May 28, 1993 – January 20, 2001
- President: Bill Clinton
- Preceded by: James B. Busey IV
- Succeeded by: Michael P. Jackson

Personal details
- Born: Mortimer Leo Downey III; August 9, 1936 Springfield, Massachusetts, U.S.
- Died: November 2, 2023 (aged 87) Oakton, Virginia, U.S.
- Party: Democratic
- Spouse: Joyce Vander Meyden (m. 1961; died 2012)
- Children: 2
- Education: Yale University (BA); New York University (MPA)

Mortimer Leo Downey III (August 9, 1936 – November 2, 2023) was an American government official who was Deputy Secretary of Transportation from 1993 to 2001, making him the longest-serving person to ever hold the post. Downey was appointed to the position at the beginning of the Clinton administration, and was the acting U.S. Secretary of Transportation for the first four days of the Bush administration, from January 21, 2001 to January 24, 2001.

Downey additionally served as executive director and chief financial officer of the New York Metropolitan Transportation Authority from 1986 to 1993, and as chairman of the Washington Metropolitan Area Transit Authority from 2015 to 2016.

== Early life and education ==
Downeywas born in Springfield, Massachusetts, on August 9, 1936. He was educated at the Phillips Academy, Yale University, and New York University. He served in the U.S. Coast Guard Reserve, attaining the rank of lieutenant commander.

== Career ==
Downey initially aspired to a career in finance, but was unable to find work in the field upon graduating from Yale in 1958. Instead, he joined the Port Authority of New York and New Jersey, where he began his focus on mass transit. In 1975, he became the first transportation program analyst for the U.S. House of Representatives Committee on the Budget. During the Carter administration, Downey served in the U.S. Department of Transportation as Assistant Secretary for Budget and Programs.

After Carter's presidency ended in 1981, Downey was hired by the New York Metropolitan Transportation Authority (MTA) as an assistant executive director. Five years later, he became executive director and chief financial officer, where he organized critical efforts to raise more money for the authority, which had been struggling financially for years. The MTA's budget increased by $3 billion during his tenure, and New York Senator Daniel Patrick Moynihan once noted, "He left almost as popular as when he arrived. No one has done that with a subway system in our time".

In 1993, Downey joined the Clinton administration as deputy transportation secretary, serving for all eight years. He was involved with the creation of the Transportation Equity Act for the 21st Century. Following completion of his service as Deputy Secretary of Transportation in 2001, he became a transportation consultant. He was on the Obama transition team, and the subject of speculation as a possible Secretary of Transportation in the Obama administration.

In 2010, Downey was appointed to the board of directors of the Washington Metropolitan Area Transit Authority, to one of the seats chosen by the federal government. The Washington Post said that he was selected to guide the Metro out of a state of considerable disarray which had grown amid years of shrinking ridership and decaying infrastructure; the system was plunged into further crisis after a deadly train collision the year before. He served as Board Chair from 2015 to 2016. His period as chairman was marred by poor relations with fellow board members, some of whom accused him of inefficiency, and eventually, of having a conflict of interest, due to his job as an advisor with an engineering firm which worked with the Metro. While a subsequent ethics investigation cleared him of any wrongdoing, the hostile environment led Downey to leave the role after one year. In April 2016, three of the federally-appointed members of the board were replaced, including Downey.

Downey was a Fellow of the National Academy of Public Administration.

== Personal life and death ==
In 1961, Downey married Joyce Vander Meyden. They had two children and were married until her death in 2012.

On November 2, 2023, Downey died from pulmonary fibrosis at a retirement home in Oakton, Virginia, at the age of 87.
