= United States Secretary of Transportation =

Head of the Department of Transportation

- Seal of the Department of Transportation

- Flag of the secretary

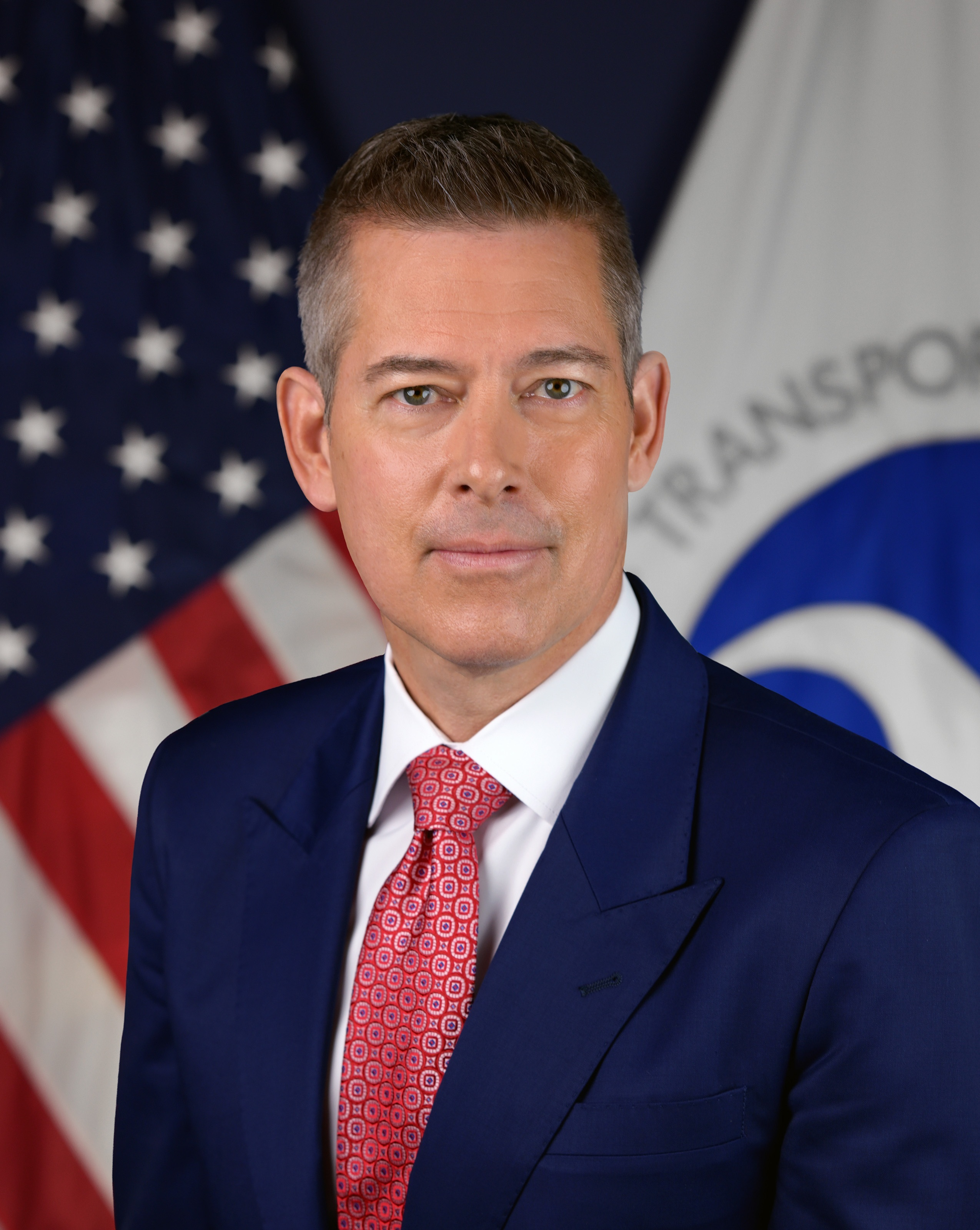
- Incumbent; Sean Duffy since January 28, 2025
- United States Department of Transportation
- Style: Mr. Secretary (informal); The Honorable (formal)
- Member of: Cabinet of the United States
- Reports to: President of the United States
- Seat: Washington, D.C.
- Appointer: The president; with advice and consent of the Senate
- Term length: No fixed term
- Constituting instrument: 49 U.S.C. § 102
- Formation: October 15, 1966 (60 years ago)
- First holder: Alan Stephenson Boyd
- Succession: Fourteenth
- Deputy: Deputy Secretary
- Salary: Executive Schedule, Level I
- Website: transportation.gov

The United States secretary of transportation is the head of the United States Department of Transportation. The secretary serves as the principal advisor to the president of the United States on all matters relating to transportation. The secretary is a statutory member of the Cabinet of the United States, and is fourteenth in the presidential line of succession.

The secretary of transportation oversees the U.S. Department of Transportation, which has over 55,000 employees and thirteen agencies, including the Federal Aviation Administration, the Federal Highway Administration, the Federal Railroad Administration, and the National Highway Traffic Safety Administration. As of January 2021, the secretary receives an annual salary of $221,400.

Sean Duffy has served as the 20th secretary of transportation since January 28, 2025. He was appointed by President Donald Trump to serve this position, and was confirmed by the Senate in a 77-22 vote.

== History ==
The post was created on October 15, 1966, by the Department of Transportation Act, signed into law by President Lyndon B. Johnson. The department's mission is "to develop and coordinate policies that will provide an efficient and economical national transportation system, with due regard for need, the environment, and the national defense."

The first secretary of transportation was Alan S. Boyd, nominated to the post by Democratic president Lyndon B. Johnson. Ronald Reagan's second secretary of transportation, Elizabeth Dole, was the first female holder, and Mary Peters was the second. Gerald Ford's nominee William Thaddeus Coleman Jr. was the first African American to serve as transportation secretary, and Federico Peña, serving under Bill Clinton, was the first Hispanic to hold the position, subsequently becoming the secretary of energy. Japanese-American Norman Mineta, who had previously been the secretary of commerce, is the longest-serving secretary, holding the post for over five and a half years, and Andrew Card is the shortest-serving secretary, serving only eleven months. Pete Buttigieg is the youngest secretary, taking office at 39 years 15 days old, overtaking Neil Goldschmidt as the youngest secretary, taking office at 39 years 3 months old, while Norman Mineta was the oldest, retiring at age 74. Buttigieg is also the first openly gay man to hold the position, as well as being the first openly gay Cabinet secretary, and the first to seek a full senate confirmation. In April 2008, Mary Peters launched the official blog of the secretary of transportation called The Fast Lane. On January 23, 2009, the 16th secretary, Ray LaHood, took office, serving under the administration of Democrat Barack Obama; he had previously been a Republican congressman from Illinois for fourteen years.

Anthony Foxx was the 17th U.S. secretary of transportation from 2013 to 2017, when Barack Obama was president. Elaine Chao, who served as the secretary of labor under President George W. Bush, was nominated by Donald Trump on November 29, 2016. On January 31, 2017, the Senate confirmed her appointment by a vote of 93–6. On January 7, 2021, Chao announced her resignation following the January 6 United States Capitol attack, effective January 11. On January 11, 2021, acting deputy secretary of transportation Steven G. Bradbury became acting secretary of transportation. Pete Buttigieg served as the 19th secretary of transportation during the presidency of Joe Biden.

== List of secretaries of transportation ==
Parties

Democratic (8) Republican (12)

Status

Denotes acting secretary of transportation

No.	Portrait	Secretary	State of residence	Took office	Left office	President
1	Black-and-white photo of a balding man in a suit and striped tie	Alan S. Boyd	Florida	January 16, 1967	January 20, 1969	Lyndon B. Johnson (1963–1969)
2	Black-and-white photo of man in a suit and black tie	John Volpe	Massachusetts	January 22, 1969	February 2, 1973	Richard Nixon (1969–1974)
3	Color photo of a bald man wearing glasses and a suit with a striped tie	Claude Brinegar	California	February 2, 1973	February 1, 1975	Richard Nixon (1969–1974)
3	Color photo of a bald man wearing glasses and a suit with a striped tie	Claude Brinegar	California	February 2, 1973	February 1, 1975	Gerald Ford (1974–1977)
4	Black-and-white photo of an African American man in a suit wearing glasses looking to his left	William Thaddeus Coleman Jr.	Pennsylvania	March 7, 1975	January 20, 1977	Gerald Ford (1974–1977)
5	Black-and-white photo of a man in a suit smiling	Brock Adams	Washington	January 23, 1977	July 20, 1979	Jimmy Carter (1977–1981)
6	Black-and-white photo of a man with a wide smile and short curly hair wearing a light-colored suit	Neil Goldschmidt	Oregon	September 24, 1979	January 20, 1981	Jimmy Carter (1977–1981)
7	Black-and-white photo of a man wearing a suit sitting at a desk with his hands folded on it and the DOT logo and US flag behind him	Drew Lewis	Pennsylvania	January 23, 1981	February 1, 1983	Ronald Reagan (1981–1989)
8	Photo of a smiling woman wearing earrings	Elizabeth Dole	Kansas	February 7, 1983	September 30, 1987	Ronald Reagan (1981–1989)
9	Black-and-white photo of a man in a suit and combed-over hair with the US flag behind him	James H. Burnley IV	North Carolina	December 3, 1987	January 20, 1989	Ronald Reagan (1981–1989)
10	Smiling man with thinning hair wearing a suit and a blue tie with the US flag behind him	Samuel K. Skinner	Illinois	February 6, 1989	December 13, 1991	George H. W. Bush (1989–1993)
11	Smiling man wearing a suit and a red tie	Andrew Card	Massachusetts	February 24, 1992	January 20, 1993	George H. W. Bush (1989–1993)
12	Hispanic man with large glasses and black hair with the US flag behind him	Federico Peña	Colorado	January 21, 1993	February 14, 1997	Bill Clinton (1993–2001)
13	African American man with short hair and a short mustache	Rodney E. Slater	Arkansas	February 14, 1997	January 20, 2001	Bill Clinton (1993–2001)
–	Acting United States Secretary of Transportation	Mortimer L. Downey III; Acting	Virginia	January 20, 2001	January 25, 2001	George W. Bush (2001–2009)
14	Older Japanese American man with glasses wearing a suit with a red tie with the US flag behind him	Norman Mineta	California	January 25, 2001	August 7, 2006	George W. Bush (2001–2009)
–	Acting United States Secretary of Transportation	Maria Cino; Acting	New York	August 7, 2006	October 17, 2006	George W. Bush (2001–2009)
15	Woman with long brown hair with the US flag behind her	Mary E. Peters	Arizona	October 17, 2006	January 20, 2009	George W. Bush (2001–2009)
16		Ray LaHood	Illinois	January 23, 2009	July 2, 2013	Barack Obama (2009–2017)
17	Mayor Anthony Foxx, Charlotte NC	Anthony Foxx	North Carolina	July 2, 2013	January 20, 2017	Barack Obama (2009–2017)
–		Michael Huerta; Acting	California	January 20, 2017	January 31, 2017	Donald Trump (2017–2021)
18		Elaine Chao	Kentucky	January 31, 2017	January 11, 2021	Donald Trump (2017–2021)
–		Steven G. Bradbury; Acting	Oregon	January 12, 2021	January 20, 2021	Donald Trump (2017–2021)
–		Lana Hurdle; Acting	Virginia	January 20, 2021	February 3, 2021	Joe Biden (2021–2025)
19		Pete Buttigieg	Indiana (Note: In July 2022, Buttigieg established his permanent residence in Traverse City, Michigan.)	February 3, 2021	January 20, 2025	Joe Biden (2021–2025)
–		Judith Kaleta; Acting	Illinois	January 20, 2025	January 28, 2025	Donald Trump (2025–present)
20		Sean Duffy	New Jersey	January 28, 2025	present	Donald Trump (2025–present)

== Line of succession ==
The line of succession regarding who would act as Secretary of Transportation in the event of a vacancy or incapacitation is as follows:

1. Deputy Secretary of Transportation
2. Under Secretary of Transportation for Policy
3. General Counsel
4. Assistant Secretary for Budget and Programs
5. Assistant Secretary for Transportation Policy
6. Assistant Secretary for Governmental Affairs
7. Assistant Secretary for Aviation and International Affairs
8. Assistant Secretary for Administration
9. Administrator of the Federal Highway Administration
10. Administrator of the Federal Aviation Administration
11. Administrator of the Federal Motor Carrier Safety Administration
12. Administrator of the Federal Railroad Administration
13. Administrator of the Federal Transit Administration
14. Administrator of the Maritime Administration
15. Administrator of the Pipeline and Hazardous Materials Safety Administration
16. Administrator of the National Highway Traffic Safety Administration
17. Administrator of the Research and Innovative Technology Administration
18. Administrator of the Great Lakes St. Lawrence Seaway Development Corporation
19. Regional Administrator, Southern Region, Federal Aviation Administration
20. Director, Resource Center, Lakewood, Colorado, Federal Highway Administration
21. Regional Administrator, Northwest Mountain Region, Federal Aviation Administration

== Notes ==
U.S. order of precedence (ceremonial)
Preceded by Scott Turner as Secretary of Housing and Urban Development	Order of precedence of the United States as Secretary of Transportation	Succeeded by Chris Wright as Secretary of Energy
U.S. presidential line of succession
Preceded by Secretary of Housing and Urban Development; Scott Turner	14th in line	Succeeded by Secretary of Energy; Chris Wright
