= James S. C. Chao =

Chinese-American businessman (born 1927)

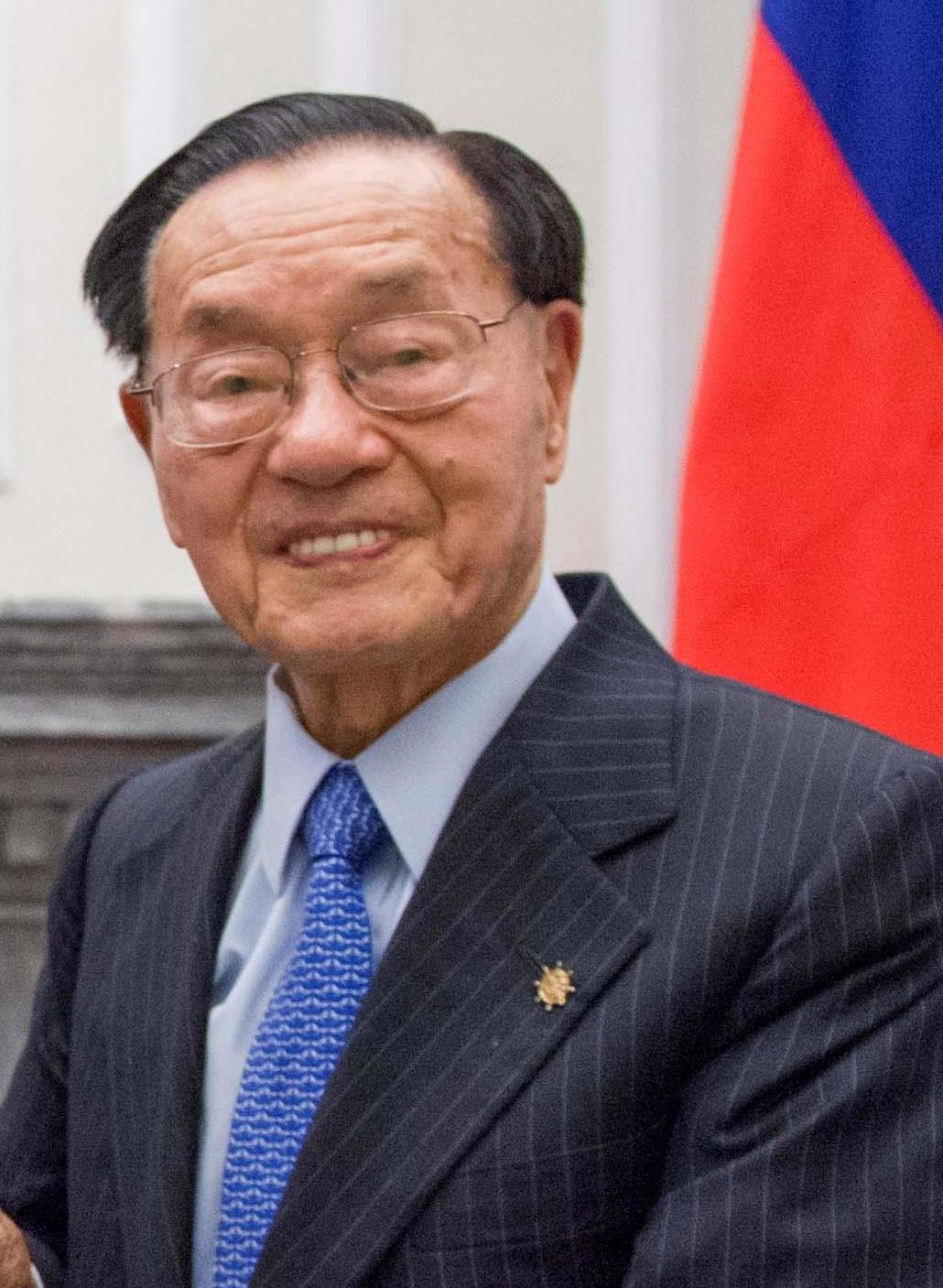
- Chao in 2016
- Born: Chao Si-Cheng; December 29, 1927 (age 98); Jiading, Shanghai, China
- Education: Wusong Merchant Marine College (BS); St. John's University (MBA)
- Occupations: Businessman; philanthropist; Sea captain
- Title: Founder of Foremost Group
- Spouse: Ruth Mulan Chu (m. 1951; died 2007)
- Children: 6, including Elaine and Angela

Chinese name
- Traditional Chinese: 趙錫成
- Simplified Chinese: 赵锡成
Transcriptions
Standard Mandarin
- Hanyu Pinyin: Zhào Xíchéng
- Wade–Giles: Chao^{4} Hsi^{2}-ch'eng^{2}

James Si-Cheng Chao (Chinese: 趙錫成; pinyin: Zhào Xíchéng; born December 29, 1927) is a Chinese-American businessman, philanthropist, and former sea captain. He is the founder of the shipping company Foremost Group. He is also known as the father of Elaine Chao and father-in-law of United States Senator Mitch McConnell.

== Early life and education ==
Chao was born on December 29, 1927, in Malu, a small, rural farming village in Jiading County outside Shanghai, Republic of China. His parents were Yi-Ren Chao, an elementary school principal, and Yu-Chin Hsu Chao. They were farmers who "emphasized the value of education".

Chao attended schools near Shanghai, including Shanghai Jiao Tong University (formerly National Chiao Tung University) and Wusong Merchant Marine College, where he majored in navigation. He finished his coursework in 1949 and went to sea as a cadet on a merchant vessel. At the climax of the Chinese Civil War, Chao's ship went to Taiwan, where it remained.

== Career ==
In the mid-1950s, Chao advanced through the ranks to become one of the youngest sea captains at the age of 29. He moved to the United States in 1958, settling in New York City the same year. He earned a master's degree in management from St. John's University in 1964.

=== Foremost Group ===
In 1964, after earning his MBA, Chao founded Foremost Group, a shipping, trading, and finance conglomerate based in New York. Chao has led the global shipping industry in incorporating "greener", more environmentally friendly designs and technology into his company's fleet of new vessels, some of the world's largest bulk carriers. In 2004, Chao was inducted into the International Maritime Hall of Fame at the United Nations in recognition of his long-standing service and dedication to the international maritime trading industry.

=== Foundation ===
Chao and his wife established the Mulan Chu Foundation (later renamed the Shanghai Mulan Education Foundation) in 1984 to provide scholarships to help students in the U.S. and China access higher education and to promote U.S.-China cultural exchanges. In October 2012, Harvard University announced that Chao and his family foundation would bequeath $40 million to the Harvard Business School for the construction of the Ruth Mulan Chu Chao Center and the establishment of the Ruth Mulan Chu and James Si-Cheng Chao Family Fellowship Fund. The center is dedicated to managerial training and executive education, the first building at Harvard Business School to be named after an East Asian woman or any person bearing an East Asian surname.

=== Controversy ===
Chao's daughter Elaine was U.S. Secretary of Labor during the presidency of George W. Bush and later Secretary of Transportation during the first presidency of Donald Trump. During that time, she was accused of using her office to promote her family's shipping business by appearing in interviews with Chao, and she asked Department of Transportation staff to promote her father's biography or to edit her father's Wikipedia article. An investigation and report ensued. According to The New York Times, there was no finding that Secretary Chao violated ethics rules. Investigation materials were provided to prosecutors, who declined to charge any crime.

== Personal life ==
Chao met his future wife, Ruth Mulan Chu Chao, when she and her family relocated to Shanghai from their ancestral estate in Anhui Province during World War II. In 1949, each relocated separately to Taiwan at the culmination of the Chinese Civil War, and they married in 1950. In 1958, Chao left his family behind when he moved to the United States, where they joined him in 1961. Ruth Mulan Chu Chao died on August 2, 2007, following a battle with lymphoma. The Chaos had six daughters: Elaine, Jeanette, May, Christine, Grace, and Angela. The eldest three daughters were born in Taiwan; the youngest three were born in the United States.

Chao's oldest daughter is Elaine Chao, who is the first woman of Asian Pacific American descent appointed to a US President's Cabinet. She served as Secretary of Labor from 2001 to 2009, and as Secretary of Transportation from 2017 to 2021.

Chao's daughter Angela succeeded him as CEO of Foremost Group in 2018. She died in a car accident in February 2024.

=== Awards and honors ===
Chao was awarded an honorary LL.D. degree from Niagara University in 1992. Chao is the first winner of the Chinese American Academic and Professional Society Distinguished Lifetime Achievement Award (2004). He was awarded the "Ellis Island Medal of Honor" (2005). The U.S. Department of Homeland Security, Citizen and Immigration Service recognized him in February 2008 as an Outstanding American by Choice.

In 2009, he was inducted into the Horatio Alger Association of Distinguished Americans. Also, Nyack College conferred upon him the honorary D.Litt. degree. In 2010, the Museum of Chinese in America honored Chao with its inaugural Outstanding Achievement Award for the Chao Family; the first time such an honor has been awarded in its 130-year history.

Chao was an advisor, adjunct professor, and member of the St. John's University Board of Trustees for decades, and the recipient of St. John's University's Medal of Honor. Chao continues as its Trustee Emeritus.

Chao was, for more than a decade, the Chairman of both Taiwan's Chiao-Tung University Alumni Association in America and Chiao-Tung University Alumni Foundation of America from 1988 to 1999.

In 2025, Chao received a Lifetime Achievement Award from the American Bureau of Shipping, the Legacy Award from the National Asian/Pacific Islander American Chamber of Commerce & Entrepreneurship (National ACE), and the Coast Guard Foundation Award.

== See also ==
- Chinese Americans in New York City
