= Thomas C. Nelson =

American businessman and CEO (born c.1961)

- Born: 1961 or 1962 (age 64–65)
- Education: Stanford University; Harvard Business School
- Occupation: Businessman
- Title: Chairman and CEO, National Gypsum
- Term: 1999-
- Spouse: Anna Wildy Spangler
- Children: 2 daughters
- Relatives: Clemmie Spangler (father-in-law)

Thomas Craig Nelson (born 1961/1962) is an American businessman, and the chairman, CEO and president of National Gypsum, a company wholly owned by the Spangler family, since 1999.

== Early life ==
He is the son of Mr and Mrs Nels Richard Nelson of Glenview, Illinois, an IBM marketing executive in Chicago. His parents are both immigrants from Sweden.

== Education ==
Nelson earned a bachelor's degree in industrial engineering from Stanford University in 1984, and an MBA from Harvard Business School in 1988.

== Career ==
Nelson was vice chairman and chief financial officer of National Gypsum from 1995 to 1999, and has been the chairman, CEO and president since 1999.

== Personal life ==
In 1990, Nelson married Anna Wildy Spangler, a Wellesley College graduate, a fellow 1988 Harvard Business School graduate, and a fellow partner in Wakefield Group, a Charlotte, N.C. venture capital firm. She is the daughter of Clemmie Spangler.

They have two daughters, and live in Charlotte, North Carolina.
