= Jim Breyer =

American venture capitalist (born 1961)

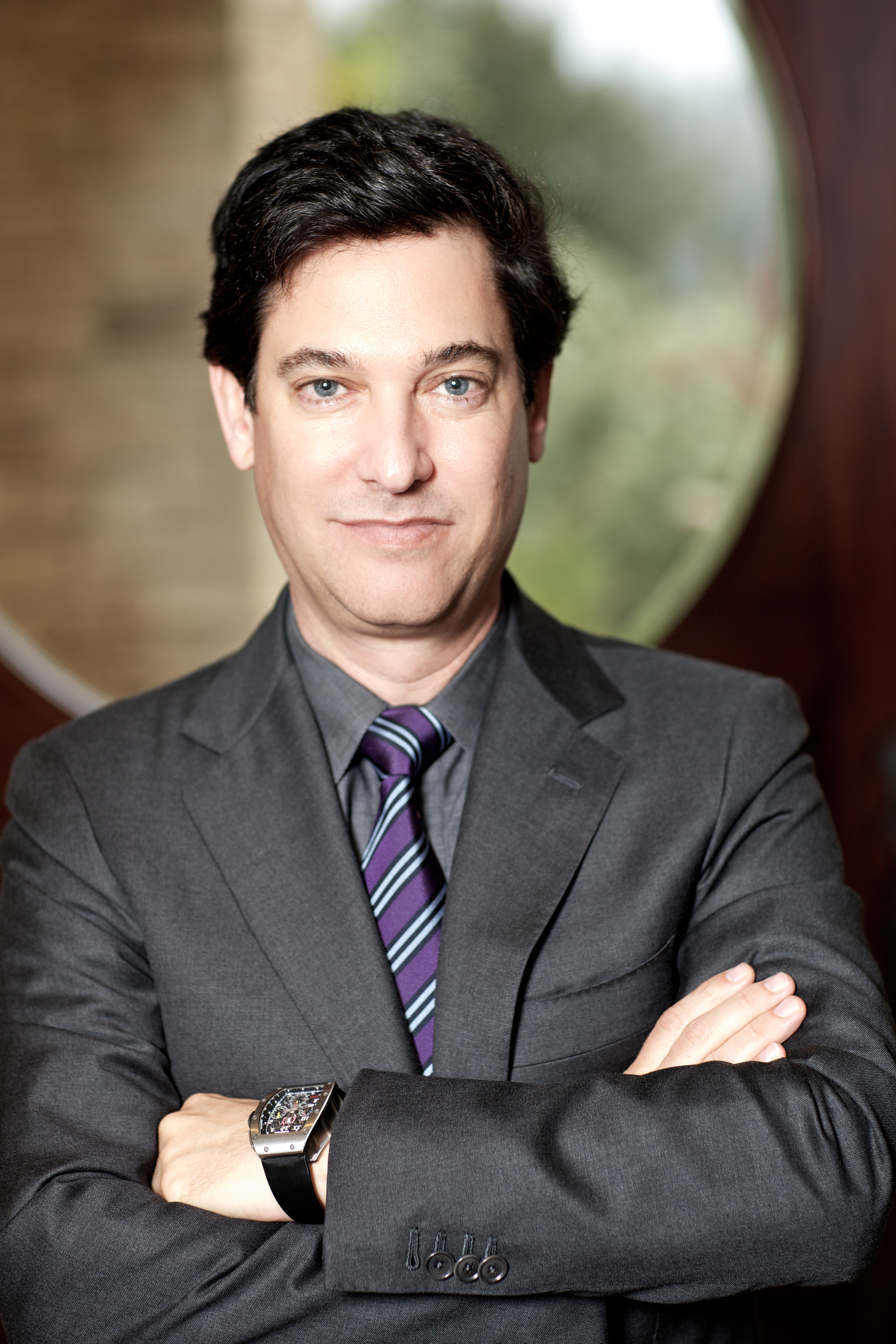
- Born: James W. Breyer; July 26, 1961 (age 65); New Haven, Connecticut, U.S.
- Education: Stanford University (BS); Harvard University (MBA)
- Occupations: Venture capitalist, investor
- Known for: Founder of Breyer Capital
- Spouses: Susan Z. Breyer (div. 2004) Angela Chao (m. 2012; died 2024)
- Children: 4

James W. Breyer (born 26 July 1961) is an American venture capitalist, founder and chief executive officer of Breyer Capital, an investment and venture philanthropy firm, and a former managing partner at Accel Partners, a venture capital firm. Breyer has invested in over 40 companies that have gone public or completed a merger, with some of these investments, including Facebook, earning over 100 times cost and many others over 25 times cost. On the Forbes 2021 list of the 400 richest Americans, he was ranked #389, with a net worth of US$2.9 billion.

== Early life and education ==
Breyer was born in 1961 in New Haven, Connecticut, the son of Hungarian immigrants. His father, John P. Breyer, was an engineer and executive at International Data Group; his mother, Eva, was an executive at Honeywell. In 1983, Breyer received a B.S. with Distinction in Interdisciplinary Studies from Stanford University. He spent his junior year studying in Florence, Italy, and is active in what is now Stanford's Breyer Center for Overseas Studies in Florence. He was drawn to Silicon Valley's technology industry and during college he worked part-time for both Hewlett-Packard and Apple Inc. After college, he accepted a job as a management consultant for McKinsey & Company in New York for two years. In 1987, he earned a Master of Business Administration from Harvard University where he was named a Baker Scholar graduating in the top 5% of his class.

== Background ==
=== Accel Partners and Breyer Capital ===
In 1987, he accepted a job with the venture capital firm Accel Partners in San Francisco and was mentored by founders Arthur Patterson and Jim Swartz. In 1990, he was named a partner and in 1995, he became a managing partner.

Accel Partners was Facebook's biggest shareholder after Mark Zuckerberg, owning an 11% stake at the time of the company's IPO. In 2005, Breyer led Accel Partners' $12.7 million investment at a $98 million valuation in the then ten-employee startup Facebook. In 2000, Breyer also established Accel-KKR, a joint venture between Accel Partners and the private equity firm KKR. Breyer also led the 2004 management buyout of BBN Technologies from Verizon.

Breyer has led several Series A investments, including Etsy, Clinkle and Circle Internet Financial. He has also led investments in Legendary Pictures and Spotify. Forbes said of Breyer, "He glides easily within and between circles: Silicon Valley, China, Europe, and Hollywood."

In 2006, Breyer founded Breyer Capital, a global equity investor focused on providing capital to help catalyze high impact social and for-profit entrepreneurs. Breyer continues to manage the fund as CEO. Breyer Capital has participated in a number of investments including Harvard's Experiment Fund, Brightcove, Marvel Entertainment and Legendary Pictures.

In 2014, Breyer joined the Wickr board of directors, pledging $30 million in funding. Wickr is a messaging app that seeks to provide encrypted and self-destructing messages for users which pledges a strict commitment to user privacy.

In July 2016, Breyer also joined the board of the alternative investment firm The Blackstone Group, the largest such firm in the world according to a 2013 New York Times piece.

In 2020, Breyer established a second office for Breyer Capital in Austin, Texas. Since establishing its Austin office, Breyer Capital has backed startups including Sana Benefits, Bestow, ClosedLoop.ai.

=== Investment in Healthcare AI ===
Since 2016, Breyer Capital has prioritized investments in opportunities at the intersection of artificial intelligence, healthcare, and life sciences. The Breyer Capital healthcare portfolio includes Xaira, co-founded by Nobel Laureate Dr. David Baker, and Paige AI, co-founded by Dr. Thomas Fuchs, the Chief AI Officer at Eli Lilly. Other healthcare AI companies backed by Breyer Capital include: Atropos Health, SandboxAQ, Iterative Scopes, and Soley Therapeutics.

=== Investment in China ===
In 2005, Breyer helped establish a joint venture between Accel Partners and China-based IDG Capital Partners, a pioneering Chinese investment firm behind Baidu and Tencent. Breyer and Patrick Joseph McGovern, the Founder and CEO of IDG, have served as co-leads on the Accel-IDG joint venture's strategic investment committee since its inception in 2005. Breyer is active in the Chinese investment community and continues to invest in the country through Breyer Capital and partnerships with IDG. Additionally, he is a member of the advisory board of the Tsinghua University School of Economics and Management, Beijing.

In June 2014, IDG Capital announced the closing of IDG China Venture Capital Fund IV, a $586 million tech venture capital fund focused on making early-stage technology, media and telecom (TMT) investments in China. IDG also announced the participation of Breyer Capital and stated Jim will play a leading strategic advisory role in the new fund.

In June 2016, the Wall Street Journal published a piece on what is one of the largest ever China-focused venture capital funds raised, $1 billion in capital commitments for the IDG Capital Fund III of Breyer and IDG Capital.

Since 2017, Breyer Capital has suspended its investments in China.

== Professional associations and memberships ==
In February 2013, Breyer was elected a fellow of the Harvard Corporation, Harvard University's senior governing board. He also serves on the Board of the Dean's Advisors of the Harvard Business School and is a founding member of the Harvard University Global Advisory Council. In December 2005, Breyer was appointed an honorary professor at the Yuelu Academy, Hunan University, China. Jim is the past chairman and remains a board member of the Tsinghua University Advisory Board for the School of Economics and Management. He also is a member of the University of Texas President's Innovation Board.

He is a member of various World Economic Forum committees, and a member of the Lead Director Network, an organization of directors dedicated to improving the performance of their corporations and earning the trust of their shareholders through more effective board leadership. Additionally, Breyer serves as the Chairman of the Stanford University Engineering Venture Fund and is on the board of the Stanford Technology Ventures Program. In 2019, Breyer helped found the Stanford HAI program which focuses on the future of AI.

Breyer previously served on the boards of Etsy, Legendary Entertainment, Circle Financial, and 21st Century Fox where he was Chairman of the Compensation Committee and a member of the Nominating Committee. He is also a minority owner of the Boston Celtics.

In the past, Breyer has served on a number of public and private boards, including: Facebook from April, 2005 to June, 2013 where he was a Chairman of the Compensation Committee; Wal-Mart Stores, Inc., as the lead/presiding independent director from 2001 until he resigned in June 2013; Marvel Entertainment as founding Chairman of the Strategic Planning Committee from 2006 until their acquisition by The Walt Disney Company in 2009; News Corporation from 2011 to 2013; Dell Inc., where he was the founding Chairman of the Strategic Planning and Finance Committee from 2009 until 2013; Brightcove, an online video platform which went public in 2012; and Model N as a founding investor and board member. Breyer is a member of the Council on Foreign Relations, Pacific Community Ventures, and TechNet. Jim is a Trustee of the Metropolitan Museum of Art, where his wife, Angela Chao, was also a Member of the Chairman's Council, and a Trustee of the San Francisco Museum of Modern Art.

Breyer has previously held a number of other leadership positions, including: Chairman of the National Venture Capital Association (NVCA); President of the Western Association of Venture Capitalists; Member of the Board of the Associates of the Harvard Business School; Chairman of the Harvard Business School California Research Center; and Chairman of the Silicon Valley region committee for Stanford University's Campaign for Undergraduate Education.

Jim Breyer's economic commentary and analysis regarding international market movements and investment trends have been cited in various financial publications, including Fortune, the New York Times and Business Insider.

== Awards and achievements ==
For three consecutive years, from 2011 to 2013, Forbes has ranked Jim Breyer number one on the Forbes Midas List of Tech's Top Investors. Breyer received the Silicon Valley Forum's Visionary Award in 2012. He was also named to the Vanity Fair New Establishment Hall of Fame in 2012. In 2014, Breyer was given a Lifetime Achievement Award by Venture Capital Journal. In 2014, he received the Golden Plate Award of the American Academy of Achievement presented by Awards Council member Justice Anthony Kennedy during the International Achievement Summit in San Francisco. In 2024, the University of Texas at Austin recognized Breyer with the Presidential Citation Award.

== Politics ==
In April 2013, a lobbying group called FWD.us (aimed at lobbying for immigration reform and improvements to education) was launched, with Jim Breyer listed as one of the founders. Breyer was at a time mistakenly registered as a member of the American Independent Party, and has since re-registered as an independent.

== Personal life ==
Breyer was married to the CEO of Foremost Group, philanthropist Angela Chao, the youngest sister of Elaine Chao and the widow of Bruce Wasserstein, until her death in February 2024. They had a son who was three years old when Chao died. Elaine Chao, the former U.S. Secretary of Transportation, is married to Senate Minority Leader Mitch McConnell, making Breyer and McConnell brothers-in-law.

Breyer was previously married to his college sweetheart and impressionist artist Susan Zaroff, with whom he had three children, Emily, Daniel, and Theodore (Ted). They divorced in 2004. Daniel and Ted are partners at Breyer Capital and co-founders of Breyer Labs, a bootstrapped cryptocurrency fund.
