= Spangler Center =

Building in Boston, Massachusetts, United States

- Interactive map of the Spangler Center area

General information
- Location: Spangler Center at Harvard Business School,, 117 Western Ave, Boston, Massachusetts, United States
- Coordinates: 42.3651974°N 71.1243886°W
- Completed: 2001
- Owner: Harvard Business School

Technical details
- Floor count: 2

Design and construction
- Architect: Robert A.M. Stern Architects

The Spangler Center is a building on the Boston campus of Harvard Business School. Harvard Business School is in Allston, Massachusetts neighborhood of Boston, Massachusetts, U.S., across the street from the Harvard John A. Paulson School of Engineering and Applied Sciences, opening in 2021.

== Overview ==
The building was named in honor of billionaire alumnus Clemmie Spangler, who made a donation to towards the construction. It cost $32 million in total. Its construction was completed in 2001.

According to the HBS website, the building "is considered the main student center for MBAs." It includes "29 project rooms", "a 350-seat auditorium", "IT Support Services, a branch of The Coop bookstore, a business center, a post office retail outlet, Student Association offices, a course material distribution center, and an ATM" as well as the Meredith Room, named for Spangler's wife, and the Williams Room, named for HBS professor Charles M. Williams.

== Architectural design ==
The building was designed in the Georgian Revival architectural style by Robert A.M. Stern Architects. In Architect Magazine, Witold Rybczynski wrote that it "resembles a large country house." In The Boston Globe, critic Robert Campbell called it "the best piece of traditional architecture to be built in Greater Boston since the early decades of the twentieth century."

== See also ==
- Baker Library/Bloomberg Center
- Ruth Mulan Chu Chao Center
