= Clemmie Spangler =

American businessman (1932–2018)

- Born: Clemmie Dixon Spangler Jr. April 5, 1932; Charlotte, North Carolina, U.S.
- Died: July 22, 2018 (aged 86)
- Other names: C. D. Spangler; Dick Spangler
- Education: University of North Carolina; Harvard University
- Occupation: Businessman
- Known for: Owner, National Gypsum
- Spouse: Meredith Riggs Spangler
- Children: 2 daughters
- Relatives: Thomas C. Nelson (son-in-law)

Clemmie Dixon Spangler Jr. (April 5, 1932 – July 22, 2018) was an American billionaire businessman, and the owner of National Gypsum. On the Forbes 2016 list of the world's billionaires, he was ranked #722 with a net worth of US$2.4 billion. He was president of the University of North Carolina from 1986 to 1997.

== Early life ==
Clemmie Spangler was born in Charlotte, North Carolina, in 1932. He graduated from the University of North Carolina at Chapel Hill, where he was a member of Sigma Alpha Epsilon fraternity, and received an MBA from Harvard University.

His father, Clemmie Dixon Spangler Sr., founded C. D. Spangler Construction Company in 1947.

== Career ==
In 1958, Spangler joined his father's company, C.D. Spangler Construction, and became president, a post he held for 28 years.

Spangler went on to head his father's bank, the Bank of North Carolina, merging it with NCNB in 1982. NCNB is now part of Bank of America.

He entered public service as a member of the Charlotte-Mecklenburg Board of Education in the 1970s. From 1982 to 1986 he served as chair of North Carolina's Board of Education. He then served as president of the University of North Carolina system, from 1986 to 1997. As president, he was a staunch advocate for keeping tuition costs low, and he donated his salary to individual campuses in the UNC system.

In 1995, Spangler took over National Gypsum for $1.2 billion, through Delcor Inc., a private investment company controlled by him. Spangler had been chairman of National Gypsum and owned 20% of the company, and his family went on to own the whole company.

== Philanthropy ==
Spangler served as President of Harvard University's Board of Overseers from 2003 to 2004. The Spangler Center at Harvard Business School is named for him. Through his C.D. Spangler Foundation, he donated to the University of North Carolina, Harvard University, and to Charlotte's Teach for America. As a hobby, he liked to fix old clocks.

== Personal life ==
Spangler was married to Meredith Riggs Spangler. She graduated from Wellesley College in 1955, and their betrothal was announced in the New York Times in March 1960. She was the daughter of Arad McCutchan Riggs and Frieda Wildy Riggs (1907-2000).

They had two daughters, Anna Spangler Nelson, and Abigail Riggs Spangler. Anna Spangler Nelson is a member of the UNC Board of Governors.

In 1990, Anna Wildy Spangler, married fellow 1988 Harvard Business School graduate Thomas C. Nelson, and he has been chairman and CEO of National Gypsum since 1999.

In 1995, Abigail Riggs Spangler married lawyer Jeffrey Donald Nuechterlein, son of Donald Nuechterlein of Charlottesville, Virginia, who was a professor of international relations at the Federal Executive Institute. She has a bachelor's degree from Wellesley College and a master's degree in political science from Columbia University.

The C.D. Spangler Jr. Building is named for him and serves as the main building, along with the Meredith Riggs Spangler Building, for the UNC System offices.
