= Lists of East Asian surnames =

Lists of East Asian surnames include common Chinese, Japanese, and Korean surnames, or family names.

- List of common Chinese surnames
- List of common Japanese surnames
- List of Korean surnames

== See also ==
- East Asian name (disambiguation)
