= Donald Nuechterlein =

American diplomat and academic (1925–2022)

- Born: June 20, 1925; Saginaw, Michigan, U.S.
- Died: July 7, 2022 (aged 97); Charlottesville, Virginia, U.S.
- Education: University of Michigan
- Title: Professor of international relations, Federal Executive Institute
- Term: 1968–1988
- Spouse: Mildred Virginia Usak
- Children: 4
- Website: http://donaldnuechterlein.com/

Donald Nuechterlein
- Allegiance: United States
- Branch: US Navy
- Service years: 1943-1946 (active service); 1946-1968 (reserves)
- Rank: Lieutenant commander

Donald Edwin Nuechterlein (June 20, 1925 – July 7, 2022) was an American diplomat and academic who was a professor of international relations at the Federal Executive Institute, Charlottesville, Virginia, from 1968 to 1988.

== Early life ==
Nuechterlein was born in Saginaw, Michigan, on June 20, 1925, the son of Edwin William and Laura Anna Nuechterlein. He earned bachelor's master's and PhD degrees from the University of Michigan.

== Career ==
He was professor of international relations at the Federal Executive Institute, Charlottesville, Virginia, from 1968 to 1988.

He held the following titles with the United States government:

- U.S. Government, assistant reports officer in Berlin, Germany, 1946–47
- U.S. Department of State, Washington, DC, research analyst, 1952–54
- U.S. Embassy in Reykjavik, Iceland, 1954–56
- Desk Officer in Washington, D.C., 1957–60
- Cultural Attache, U.S. Embassy in Bangkok, Thailand, 1960–63
- U.S. Department of Defense, Washington, DC, senior staff officer, 1964–68

He was professor of international relations at the Federal Executive Institute, Charlottesville, Virginia, from 1968 to 1988.

In 1948, he married Mildred Virginia Usak, and they had four children, Jan, Jill, Jeffrey, Jonathan.

He was a fellow of the Rockefeller Foundation.

== Personal life and death ==
In 1995, his son, lawyer Jeffrey Donald Nuechterlein, married Abigail Riggs Spangler, daughter of billionaire businessman Clemmie Spangler. He died in Charlottesville, Virginia on July 7, 2022, at the age of 97.
