= Charles M. Williams (academic) =

American academic, author, and military officer

- Harvard Business School faculty portrait of Charles M. Williams, 1970s.
- Born: April 20, 1917; Romney, West Virginia, United States
- Died: November 17, 2011 (aged 94); Needham, Massachusetts, United States
- Education: Washington and Lee University (B.A.); Harvard Business School (M.B.A. and D.C.S.)
- Occupations: Professor of finance and banking at Harvard Business School
- Years active: 1947–2011
- Known for: Edmund Cogswell Converse Professor of Finance and Banking (1960–1966)
- Spouse: Mary Elizabeth "Betty" Huffman Williams
- Children: Holland Williams; Andrea Williams
- Military career
- Allegiance: United States
- Branch: United States Navy
- Service years: 1941–1947
- Rank: Lieutenant commander
- Units: Navy Supply Corps; Naval Reserve Officers Training Corps
- Conflicts: World War II (Pacific Ocean theater); Battle of the Coral Sea

Charles Marvin Williams (April 20, 1917 – November 17, 2011) was an American finance professor at Harvard Business School. He was a recognized authority on commercial banking who taught his students using the case method.

Born in Romney, West Virginia in 1917, Williams earned his bachelor's degree from Washington and Lee University and his master's degree from Harvard Business School. He served in the United States Navy during World War II, joining the faculty of Harvard Business School in 1947 and becoming a tenured professor in 1956. He retired from the school's faculty in 1986, concluding a four-decade teaching career.

Over the course of his academic career, Williams authored and co-authored hundreds of business cases, numerous articles, and several books. He also served as a consultant to a number of private institutions and received several awards and accolades for his work.

== Early life ==
Williams was born on April 20, 1917, near Romney, West Virginia. He was the second child and son of William Marvin Williams and Lula Taylor Williams. He had an older brother, Manning Holland Williams, and a younger sister, Lenora Ellen Williams. The family farm where Williams grew up had been granted to his great-great-grandfather in recognition of his service during the American Revolutionary War. Williams' father was a local banker, eventually rising to the position of President of the First National Bank of Romney. William gave his son his first lessons in banking. According to Williams, his father taught him "respect for the fundamentals: know your customers and work with them".

== Education and early career ==
During high school, Williams played several sports competitively. He attended Washington and Lee University in Lexington, Virginia, and graduated with a Bachelor of Arts degree in history and economics in 1937. He served as the vice-president of his senior class and was a member of the Kappa Alpha Order. Like his older brother, Manning Holland Williams, he earned his degree after three years and was admitted to Phi Beta Kappa. At the age of 19, Williams enrolled at Harvard Business School, receiving his Master of Business Administration degree two years later. Following his graduation from Harvard Business School, Williams worked in the loan department at Manufacturers Trust Company in New York City for two years. Williams traveled to Europe, in 1937 and 1939, visiting Germany, Austria and Czechoslovakia. Prior to this experience, Williams was an avowed pacifist, but after visiting Nazi Germany he felt obligated to enlist in the United States Navy.

== Military service ==
Williams received his commission as an ensign in the Navy. He attended the Navy Supply Corps School for new junior officers, which was then located on Harvard Business School's campus. Following the completion of his initial training, Williams was assigned to the aircraft carrier USS Lexington (CV-2), where he served as a dispersing officer (or paymaster) for a 2,000-person crew. The USS Lexington was deployed to the Pacific Ocean theater. In May 1942, the USS Lexington was sunk by Japanese forces during the Battle of the Coral Sea. During the evacuation of the Lexington, Williams swung from a line onto the deck of an American destroyer that had arrived to rescue the crew of the sinking aircraft carrier.

Post-rescue, Williams was assigned to shore duty and served as an instructor at the Navy Supply Corps School at Harvard University. After another reassignment, he was assigned as an instructor to a Naval Reserve Officers Training Corps program at the University of Michigan in Ann Arbor, Michigan. While instructing the Naval ROTC, Williams was also asked by the dean of the University of Michigan's School of Business to instruct 150 students in business and finance. After a year of teaching at the University of Michigan, Williams was discharged from the United States Navy with the military rank of lieutenant commander in 1947.

== Academic and business career ==
Williams joined the faculty of Harvard Business School in 1947 as an assistant professor. He taught the school's requisite first-year "Finance" course and subsequently took over the "Management of Financial Institutions" course, one of the school's more popular second-year electives. The two sections of the "Management of Financial Institutions" elective course instructed by Williams were regularly oversubscribed. While teaching at Harvard Business School, Williams earned his doctorate in commercial science in 1951 and was promoted to associate professor. He became a tenured professor in 1956. From 1960 to 1966, Williams served as the school's Edmund Cogswell Converse Professor of Finance and Banking. He retired from the school's faculty in 1986 after a span of 39 years teaching at the institution. Following his retirement, Williams was Harvard Business School's George Gund Professor of Commercial Banking Emeritus until his death in 2011.

According to Harvard Business School, Williams once described teaching as a "real thrill". Williams utilized the case study method of teaching, using real life examples to facilitate discussion among his students. While serving as a professor at Harvard Business School, Williams received honors and awards for his teaching and served on a number of corporate boards. Williams was also the author or co-author of hundreds of cases as well as numerous articles and several books, including Basic Business Finance: Text and Cases, which he co-authored with fellow Harvard Business School professors Pearson Hunt and Gordon Donaldson. Basic Business Finance is considered one of the seminal textbooks in the fields of business and finance and was adopted for use in more than 300 colleges and universities. In 1951, Williams authored the book Cumulative Voting for Directors, a study of cumulative voting by stockholders to elect corporate directors. Two years later, he co-authored the textbook Case Problems in Finance with Harvard Business School colleague Pearson Hunt. Williams also authored and co-authored cases illustrating financial policies of banks and corporations, including Chase Manhattan Bank, First Pennsylvania Corporation and General Motors.

Williams' notable former students include John S. R. Shad, chairman of the U.S. Securities and Exchange Commission; Thomas C. Theobald, chairman and chief executive officer of Continental Bank Corporation; Clemmie Spangler, President of the University of North Carolina; and John H. McArthur, Dean Emeritus of Harvard Business School.

Williams was also involved in Harvard Business School's Executive Education programs and was a member of the initial faculty group for the School's International Senior Management Program (now part of the Advanced Management Program) in Switzerland. He also taught in locally sponsored programs in Italy, Japan, Mexico, the Netherlands, the Philippines, the United Kingdom, and Venezuela. Under the sponsorship of the American Bankers Association, Williams conducted conferences and seminars for top officers of the largest banks in the United States and taught in the Senior Bank Officers Seminar for presidents of small banks. Sessions of the Senior Bank Officers Seminar were held at Harvard Business School for many years and were attended by approximately 2,300 executives. During the 1960s, Williams instructed numerous Harvard Business School alumni seminars on mergers and acquisitions.

Williams served as a consultant to banks and non-financial institutions and sat on the boards of several companies, including Sonat, Hammermill Paper Company and Keystone Custodial Funds. He was a trustee of the Chase Manhattan Mortgage and Realty Trust, the largest real estate investment trust of its time.

== Personal life and death ==
Williams married Mary Elizabeth "Betty" Huffman on October 19, 1946, at Lakewood Methodist Church in Lakewood, Ohio. Huffman, a graduate of Ohio Wesleyan College, was the daughter of Dr. and Mrs. Lyman Foster Huffman of Lakewood. Williams and his wife had two children together: Holland Williams and Andrea Williams. Williams and his family resided in Wellesley before relocating to Weston, where Williams and his wife lived for 43 years before he moved to the North Hill retirement community in Needham.

Following the creation of the Hampshire County Historical Society in Hampshire County, West Virginia on August 29, 1959, Williams served on the society's original board of directors. After his retirement, he continued to serve as a Harvard Business School's George Gund Professor of Commercial Banking Emeritus, and serve on boards, instruct seminars, read history, and travel. In 2006, he established the Manning H. Williams Scholarship Endowment, a permanently endowed fund at Washington and Lee University in honor of his brother.

Williams died of congestive heart failure at the age of 94 on November 17, 2011, at the North Hill retirement community in Needham. His wife of 65 years, Betty, and his two children, Holland and Andrea, were at his side at the time of his death. In addition to his wife and two children, Williams was survived by three granddaughters. A memorial service for him was held on Saturday, December 3 at First Parish Church in Weston.

== Awards and recognition ==
Williams received an honorary Bachelor of Laws degree from Washington and Lee University in 1966. He received the Distinguished Service Award from Harvard Business School in 1990. Harvard Business School established the Charles M. Williams Fund, which was endowed by many of his former students. The Charles M. Williams Fund supports teaching, course development, and research in the school's Finance Unit. In 1994, the Charles M. Williams Professor of Business Administration professorship was established in his name by Harvard Business School MBA Class of 1963. When the Spangler Campus Center opened at Harvard Business School in 2001, one of its function rooms was named after Williams. Williams's former research and case-writing assistant Paul Judy marked his 50th Reunion in 2007 by establishing the Charles M. Williams Awards to recognize outstanding teaching and contributions to student learning at Harvard Business School. The Charles M. Williams Awards were first awarded the following year in 2008.

== Legacy ==
Following his death, a plaque in Williams' honor was installed at Harvard Business School, with the following inscription: "Extraordinary teacher, inspiration to generations of students who have put his percepts into practice". According to Samuel L. Hayes III, the Jacob H. Schiff Professor of Investment Banking Emeritus, Williams was "one of the great case teachers and promoters of the case method at Harvard Business School". John H. McArthur, Dean Emeritus of Harvard Business School, said: "as a teacher, researcher, author, wise counsel, and good friend, Charlie Williams has had an enormous impact over the years on all of us at HBS as well as upon the entire banking industry." According to Stephen A. Greyser, Harvard Business School's Richard P. Chapman Professor of Business Administration Emeritus, "Charlie Williams was one of the most influential HBS professors during his tenure on the faculty. At our 50th MBA reunion, we surveyed the Class and voted him first among professors who had had an impact on our careers."

== Bibliography ==
- Aber, John W.; Williams, Charles M.; Gund, George (1967). Chase Manhattan Bank. Harvard Business School Case Services, Harvard University. Archived from the original on 2016-05-08.
- Munske, Roberta R.; Kerns, Wilmer L., eds. (2004). Hampshire County, West Virginia, 1754–2004. Romney, West Virginia: The Hampshire County 250th Anniversary Committee. ISBN 978-0-9715738-2-6. OCLC 55983178.
- Hunt, Pearson; Williams, Charles M. (1953). Case Problems in Finance. Homewood, Illinois: R. D. Irwin. OCLC 245551. Archived from the original on 2014-07-14.
- Tufano, Peter; Mullarkey, Markus F.; Williams, Charles M.; Wildern, William J. (1998). The General Motors Corporation (B): Financial Policies. Harvard Business School, Harvard University. Archived from the original on 2016-05-06.
- Washington and Lee University (1937). William H. Hudgins (ed.). The Calyx. Washington and Lee University. OCLC 8424064.
- Williams, Charles M. (1951). Cumulative Voting for Directors. Division of Research, Graduate School of Business Administration, Harvard University. OCLC 177123585. Archived from the original on 2020-10-29.
- Williams, Charles M.; Modlin, Jeffrey L. (1981). First Pennsylvania Corporation (A). Harvard Business School Case Services, Harvard University. Archived from the original on 2016-06-17.

== Archives and records ==
- Charles M. Williams papers at Baker Library Special Collections, Harvard Business School.
