= Ruth Mulan Chu Chao Center =

Building in Boston, United States of America

Coordinates: 42.366531°N 71.120090°W

Chao Center
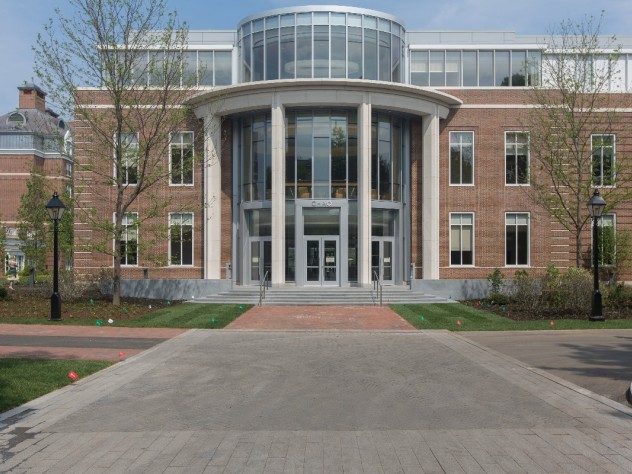
- Ruth Mulan Chu Chao Center
- Interactive map of the Chao Center area
- Alternative names: Chao Center

General information
- Location: Chao Center at Harvard Business School,, 1 Kresge Way, Boston, Massachusetts, United States
- Construction started: 2015
- Completed: 2016
- Owner: Harvard Business School

Technical details
- Floor count: 3

The Chao Center is a building on the campus of Harvard Business School which is one of 14 schools within Harvard University. It is located in the Allston neighborhood of Boston, Massachusetts, U.S. and across the street from the Harvard School of Engineering opening in 2020.

== Overview ==
The building was named in honor of Ruth Mulan Chu Chao. Its construction was completed in 2016.

The building was constructed in part with a $40-million gift from the Dr. James Si-Cheng Chao and Family Foundation. The Chao family, which honors its matriarch with the donation, made its gift in 2012. They also established the Ruth Mulan Chu and James S. C. Chao Family Fellowship to assist students with financial needs. About 10,000 executives attend programs at HBS annually, and the Chao Center will become a gateway for these students. The family itself includes a number of HBS students, the first to count four daughters as alumnae: the Honorable Elaine Chao, M.B.A. '79, secretary of labor under George W. Bush; Grace Chao, M.B.A. '78; May Chao, M.B.A. '85; and Angela Chao '95, M.B.A. '’01.

According to the HBS website, the building "is considered the main student center for Executive Education".

== See also ==
- Baker Library/Bloomberg Center
- McCollum Hall
