= Baker Library =

Baker Library may refer to:

- Baker Library/Bloomberg Center (George F. Baker Library), the library of the Harvard Business School, at Harvard University in Boston, Massachusetts, US
- Baker-Berry Library (Fisher Ames Baker Memorial Library), the main library at Dartmouth College in Hanover, New Hampshire, US
- Baker Branch Library of the East Baton Rouge Parish Library, a neighborhood branch library in Baker, Louisiana
