= Angela Chao =

American businesswoman (1973–2024)

- Born: March 4, 1973; Syosset, New York, U.S.
- Died: February 11, 2024 (aged 50); Johnson City, Texas, U.S.
- Education: Harvard University (BA, MBA)
- Spouses: Bruce Wasserstein (m. 2009; died 2009); Jim Breyer (m. 2012)
- Children: 1
- Parent(s): James S. C. Chao; Ruth Mulan Chu Chao
- Relatives: Elaine Chao (sister)

Angela Chao (March 4, 1973 – February 11, 2024) was an American billionaire businesswoman who was the chief executive officer of the Foremost Group.

== Early life and education ==
Of Chinese (with Taiwanese heritage) descent, Chao was born in Syosset, New York, and grew up in Harrison, New York. Her father was James S. C. Chao, who founded Foremost Group in 1964. Her mother was Ruth Mulan Chu Chao. She was the youngest of six sisters, one of whom is Elaine Chao, former United States Secretary of Transportation and Secretary of Labor. Her parents were born in mainland China, but fled to Taiwan in 1949 due to the Chinese Civil War. Her father came to the United States in 1958, while her mother and three oldest sisters moved to the United States in 1961. At the age of nine, Chao began joining her father on ship visits.

Chao went to Harvard for her undergraduate degree, which she completed in three years, graduating magna cum laude with a degree in economics in 1994. She went on to receive her M.B.A. from Harvard Business School.

== Career ==
Chao worked in mergers and acquisitions at Smith Barney, now a part of Morgan Stanley. She joined their family business Foremost Group in 1996, where she succeeded her father as CEO in 2018. Foremost Group operates a global fleet of bulk carriers. As CEO, she became interested in adding more environmentally sustainable vessels that can burn alternative fuels to the company's roster.

She served as a member of the board of the Bank of China, a vice chair of the Council of China's Foreign Trade and a director of the China State Shipbuilding Corporation, a Chinese government-owned enterprise that makes ships for the Chinese military, Foremost Group and other customers. She was a member of the Council on Foreign Relations. Chao was a founding member of the Asian American Foundation and the co-chair of its education committee.

== Personal life ==
Chao married Bruce Wasserstein in January 2009, before his death in October of that year. She married American venture capitalist Jim Breyer in 2012; the couple had a son three years prior to her death. Chao and Breyer had moved to the Austin area during the COVID-19 pandemic. They bought a mansion in downtown Austin and a ranch in Johnson City. They had previously split their time between New York City and San Francisco, but before their son was born, they decided to raise him in Austin.

=== Death ===
On the evening of February 10, 2024, Chao was celebrating the Lunar New Year with seven female friends from her days at Harvard Business School at her Johnson City ranch. At that time, her husband Jim Breyer was in Dubai attending a summit. As her guests began leaving, at around 11:30 p.m., she got into her Tesla Model X and accidentally backed into a pond on the property while making a three-point turn. The car began sinking, and Chao was unable to open her door or break the glass as the car filled with water. Chao was on the phone for eight minutes as the car sank, from around 11:42 to 11:50 p.m., telling her friend she was going to die. Onlookers called 911 and attempted to help. Blanco County emergency personnel arrived around midnight and tried to extricate her from the submerged car.

A deputy broke the driver's door window, found Chao, and dragged her to shore. EMS workers delivered "advanced life support" for 43 minutes but were unable to revive her. She was pronounced dead at 1:40 a.m. on February 11; she was 50 years old. A March 2024 police investigation concluded that Chao "had a blood alcohol concentration level of 0.233 grams per 100 milliliters, above the legal limit in Texas of .08 grams per 100 milliliters". The investigation concluded that Chao's death was the result of an accident. The design of the Tesla Model X's reverse gear had previously been criticized by some users as confusing.
