= Melvin H. Baker =

American businessperson

Melvin H. Baker (August 11, 1885 – June 25, 1976) was an American businessperson who was the co-founder and chief executive officer of National Gypsum.

== Early life and career ==
Baker was born on 11 August 1885 in Sevierville, Tennessee. His father was a farmer and his family was of Scotch‐Irish origin. He received his education from Carson–Newman University in Jefferson City, Tennessee. After two years, he became an assistant to an auctioneer.

Between 1922 and 1925, he served as a vice president of American Manufacturers' Foreign Credit Underwriters.

In 1925, he started National Gypsum along with Joseph F. Haggerty and Clarence IC. Williams. From 1928 to 1951, he served as the president of National Gypsum.

In June 1976, he died at the age of 90.
