= Ruth Mulan Chu Chao =

Chinese American philanthropist (1930–2007)

- 趙朱木蘭
- Born: Chu Mulan; March 19, 1930; Lai'an, Anhui, China
- Died: August 2, 2007 (aged 77); New York City, U.S.
- Citizenship: United States
- Spouse: James S. C. Chao (m. 1951)
- Children: 6, including Elaine and Angela

Ruth Mulan Chu Chao
- Traditional Chinese: 趙朱木蘭
- Simplified Chinese: 赵朱木兰
Transcriptions
Standard Mandarin
- Hanyu Pinyin: Zhào Zhū Mùlán
- Wade–Giles: Chao^{4} Chu^{1} Mu^{4}-lan^{2}

Ruth Mulan Chu Chao (Chinese: 趙朱木蘭; pinyin: Zhào Zhū Mùlán; March 19, 1930 – August 2, 2007) was the matriarch of a Chinese-American family successful in shipping. In 2016, Harvard Business School dedicated the Ruth Mulan Chu Chao Center in her honor, making it the first building at the business school named for a woman and an Asian American. Four of Chao's six daughters attended the business school, including former United States Secretary of Labor and Secretary of Transportation, Elaine Chao and former Foremost Group CEO Angela Chao.

== Personal life ==
Chu Mulan (or Mulan Chu) was born on March 19, 1930, in Anhui, China, daughter of the Honorable Vei Ching Chu (朱維謙; Zhū Wéiqiān), a member of the Judicial Yuan, and Hui Ying Tien Chu (朱田慧英; Zhū Tián Huìyīng). She was named for the Chinese folklore heroine, Hua Mulan, the legendary warrior representing qualities of character, courage, and resolve.

Amidst political and economic turmoil of the Chinese Civil War, her family migrated from Anhui Province to Nanjing by 1940. As a child only eight years old, she journeyed alone back to Anhui to reclaim the family's gold that had been hidden away on their land. Sewing it into her garments and passing undetected through checkpoints of the occupying Japanese forces, she returned safely to her family, having secured resources they needed to survive the conflict. Her family eventually migrated to Shanghai, where she first attended Ming Teh Girls High School and later Number One High School in Jiading and met her future husband, James Si-Cheng Chao. They each independently went to Taiwan in 1949, and were reunited when he found her name in a local newspaper's listing of recent graduates.

They married in 1951 and began their family. When she was seven months pregnant with their third daughter in 1958, her husband achieved the highest score ever on the National Maritime Master's Examination, and he had an opportunity to study in the United States, rare for those times. They only had resources for Chao's husband to travel to the United States, and it took three years of separation before they were reunited in the U.S. Their family settled for several years in Jamaica, New York and later moved to Syosset, New York. They reared six daughters; four of them attended the Harvard Business School.

After her six daughters were grown, when she was 51 years old, she entered St. John's University in New York City and graduated at the age of 53 with a master's degree in Asian literature and history.

Ruth Mulan Chu Chao died on August 2, 2007, in New York after a seven-year battle with lymphoma.

== Philanthropy ==
James Si-Cheng Chao and Ruth Mulan Chu Chao established the Foremost Foundation "to help young people access higher education... while also supporting health care initiatives and U.S.-Asia cultural exchanges." The Foundation has provided scholarships to more than 5,000 students.

The Shanghai Jiao Tong University named the building housing its School of Naval Architecture, Ocean and Civil Engineering in honor of the philanthropy of Ruth Mulan Chu Chao and her husband, James Si-Cheng Chao, an alumnus of the university.

In 2012, the Chao family donated US$40 million to Harvard Business School, supporting the US$35 million construction of the Ruth Mulan Chu Chao Center and US$5 million to endow a scholarship fund, the Ruth Mulan Chu and James Si-Cheng Chao Family Fellowship Fund, for students of Chinese heritage.
