= Clinkle =

Former mobile payments company

- Type: Privately held company
- Industry: Mobile payments
- Founded: Palo Alto, California, United States (2012)
- Founder: Lucas Duplan
- Defunct: 2016
- Fate: Shut down
- Headquarters: San Francisco, United States
- Key people: Jim Breyer; Richard Branson; Barry McCarthy
- Products: Clinkle App; Clinkle Card; Treats SDK

Clinkle was an American startup founded in 2011, which sought to facilitate mobile payments with ultrasonic signals emitted by smartphones. The company's $25 million seed round in June 2013 was the largest in Silicon Valley history. Clinkle abandoned its ultrasonic technology due to insurmountable technical challenges and pivoted to launching a prepaid debit card service in 2014. The company ultimately failed to deliver a viable product and shut down in 2016.

== History ==
Clinkle was founded in 2011 by Lucas Duplan, then a computer science student at Stanford University. Duplan had decided to work on mobile payments during a study abroad program in London after his freshman year. Upon returning to Stanford, Duplan received guidance from Mehran Sahami, a professor who taught the university's introductory programming methodology class. Clinkle rented a house in Palo Alto, California, using money from Duplan's parents and a summer program through Highland Capital Partners. With approximately a dozen students building the app, it ran a beta test at Stanford in which testers could send payments to each other.

Through VMware co-founder Diane Greene, Duplan met Accel partner Jim Breyer, who became interested in the company after discussing it with Stanford professors and graduate students. Breyer became an investor following his first meeting and product demonstration with Duplan and participated in a round of funding for the company. By June 2013, Clinkle had raised $25 million from a broad range of investors, including Greene, Andreessen Horowitz, Intel Capital, Intuit, Peter Thiel, Owen Van Natta, and Salesforce CEO Marc Benioff. The funding amounted to the largest seed round in Silicon Valley. Shortly after, Duplan moved the 50-person company from Mountain View to San Francisco.

In October 2013, former Netflix chief financial officer Barry McCarthy became Clinkle's chief operating officer, and two more former Netflix executives later joined as vice presidents. In December 2013, the company laid off a quarter of its employees. McCarthy left Clinkle in March 2014, after less than 5 months at the company. The product launched to college students on September 24, 2014.

In November 2014 Lucas Duplan was listed on Forbes 30 Under 30, a pick the publication regretted nine years later, placing Duplan on its Hall of Shame, featuring ten picks it wished it could take back.

In 2015, seven core employees quit and the remaining team was believed to be mostly consultants providing support and no more than 12, down from 70 several years ago. Forbes reported in January 2016 that investors were losing patience with the lack of any market product and were requesting a return of funds.

In January 2016, a photo was leaked of CEO Duplan and Richard Branson burning wads of fake $100 bills to celebrate the announcement that Branson had invested in the company and would become an advisor to Duplan. Forbes reported that the purpose of the stunt was to celebrate the idea of paper money becoming "obsolete".

As of May 2016, the company had shut down.

== Product ==
Clinkle released an app for download on Google Play and the iTunes Store. Clinkle first launched on college campuses and targeted merchants near college campuses. Clinkle announced on September 26, 2013, that after two months of opening their college waitlists, over 100,000 students had signed up despite no clear product description. Until September 2014, the app had very limited functionality and only allowed users to join a waitlist with a launch date of that month and year.

Before launching, the company had released limited information about its product, despite significant press coverage. The product was intended to include a mobile app that served as an online wallet. Wallets would be linked to existing credit cards and bank accounts. A June 2013 report by TechCrunch stated that the app was going to use high-frequency sound to send payments between devices; however, the section was shortly retracted. Clinkle confirmed that the product would not require near field communication, a wireless technology used by Google Wallet and Apple Pay. Clinkle stated that the product would also provide merchants with information about their customers for the purpose of targeted sales promotions.

Despite its initial launch as an alternative payments processing system, it lost its technological edge to new products like Venmo, a peer-to-peer payments app, and later Apple Pay, which achieved what the company had originally set out to do. The company decided to pivot, and launched to the public on September 24, 2014, a new flagship downloadable application aimed at college students.

The launch debuted a Clinkle Card that allowed users to earn rewards for paying at stores and online. After every seventh payment, Clinkle card users were awarded a "Treat" to send to a friend, which had a chance of earning the recipient a free purchase.
