= National Gypsum =

American gypsum corporation

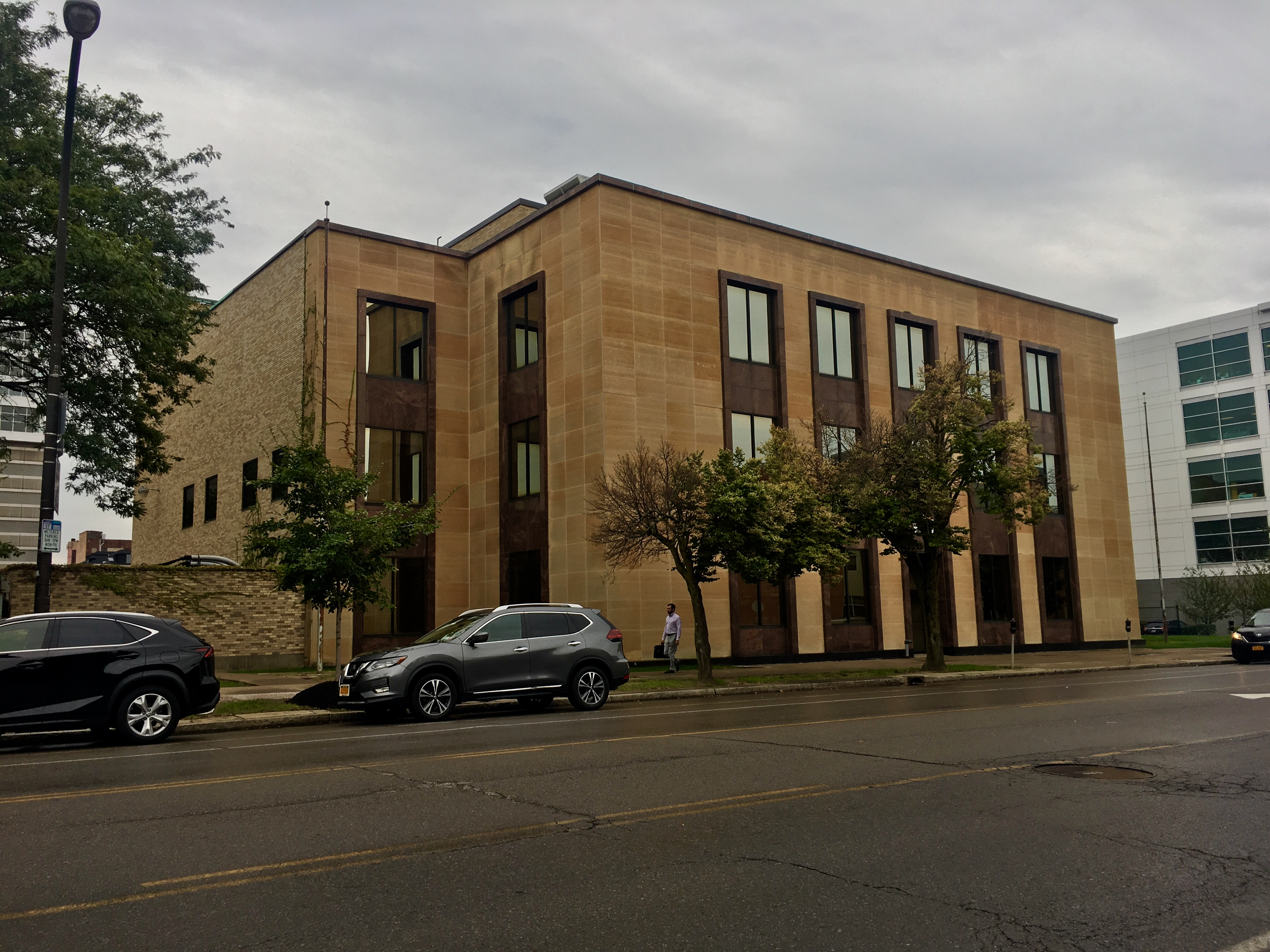
The National Gypsum Building in Buffalo, New York

National Gypsum Company is a company based in Charlotte, North Carolina, that produces drywall gypsum boards in the US. It has 17 gypsum board plants in the US and presents itself as a fully integrated building products manufacturer. It is a private company, incorporated as New NGC, Inc. in 1993 after previously filing for Chapter 11 bankruptcy in 1990. In 1995, Clemmie Spangler took over National Gypsum for $1.2 billion, through Delcor Inc., a private investment company controlled by him. Spangler had been chairman of National Gypsum and owned 20% of the company, and his family went on to own the whole company.

It is one of the six producers which hold approximately 81% of the worldwide wallboard market (Georgia Pacific, Knauf, Continental Building Products, National Gypsum, Saint-Gobain, and Yoshino Gypsum Co., Ltd).

Subsidiary National Gypsum (Canada) Ltd. operates the largest open-pit gypsum mine in the world in Milford Station, Nova Scotia.

The company was founded in 1925 by Melvin H. Baker, Joseph F. Haggerty, and Clarence E. Williams.
