= Foremost Group =

American multinational shipping company

- Type: Private
- Industry: Shipping
- Founded: 1964
- Founders: James S. C. Chao
- Headquarters: New York City
- Website: www.foremostgroupusa.com

Foremost Group is a privately held American shipping company, headquartered in New York City. It operates globally, chartering vessels to companies in the dry bulk shipping industry. Its clients include Bunge (St. Louis, MO), Cargill (Minnetonka, MN), Dreyfus (Rotterdam), MOL (Tokyo) and NYK Line (Tokyo). Foremost Group was founded in 1964 by businessman James Si-Cheng Chao and his wife Ruth Mulan Chu Chao, who each immigrated to the United States from China by way of Taiwan. Its chair and CEO from 2018 to 2024 was Angela Chao, the sixth daughter of the company's founders and the third of their children born in the United States. In 2024, Foremost marked its 60th anniversary with a gala at New York's Harvard Club.

== Commercial operations ==
Foremost has built its fleet in shipyards in Asia with financing from major American, Taiwanese, and European banks. As is typical to the industry, it does not directly contract for the movement of cargo but instead charters its vessels to charterers such as major agricultural companies or other dry bulk commodities shippers. Seventy two percent of the freight its ships carry on behalf of its charterers is shipped to China, with its ships operating primarily in the region of Korea to Australia, but also world-wide. Iron ore, bauxite, and other bulk dry goods are the principal cargoes carried by its charterers, who choose the routes and cargoes carried.

Customers have been reported to include Japan's NYK Line and MOL, Dreyfus of France, and both Bunge and Cargill of the United States.

In 2020, Foremost joined the North American Marine Environment Protection Association (NAMEPA). Lloyd's List called Foremost "one of the most respected dry cargo shipping companies in the world."

=== Humanitarian shipments ===
Early in its history, Foremost shipped rice to Vietnam under contract with the U.S. government during the Vietnam War. The United Nations contracted with Foremost to deliver humanitarian cargo to Bangladesh during its war for independence in 1971.

=== Fleet ===
In 2015 Foremost began construction of the first cargo ship jointly financed by banks in both the People's Republic of China and Taiwan; the Beijing office of China's Export Import Bank and the New York branch of Taiwan's First Commercial Bank each provided equal loan facilities to support construction of two 180,000-dwt bulk carriers. Its ships are registered under the flags of Liberia and Hong Kong. Foremost has had some of its ships built by China State Shipbuilding, some of them financed by loans from the state-owned Export-Import Bank of China.

From 2012 to 2019 its fleet grew from 17 to 33 ships, valued at $1.2 billion, the most valuable of any dry bulk shipper headquartered in the United States. It ordered the construction of 10 bulk cargo vessels in 2017 and 2018, the majority from Japanese shipyards.

In 2019, Foremost received an "eco-friendly" post-Panamax bulk carrier built by Japanese Oshima Shipyards in Nagasaki Prefecture and financed by the First Commercial Bank of Taiwan.

In 2022, Foremost ordered two additional "eco-friendly" 185,000-dwt capesize bulk carriers from Japan's Namura Shipbuilding capable of carrying multiple bulk cargoes such as iron ore and bauxite. The ships are anticipated to comply with EEDI “phase III” requirements for reduced emissions and increased efficiency. Some sources report the vessels will initially serve Foremost's long-term contract with Japanese shipper NYK Line.

== Foremost Foundation ==
The Foremost Foundation was started "to help young people access higher education and greater opportunities generally, while also supporting health care initiatives and U.S.-Asia cultural exchanges."

== Controversies ==
Based in part on Foremost's Pacific-Rim trade, US President Donald Trump, while out of office in 2022, referred to James Chao's daughter, Elaine Chao, labeling the Taiwan-born U.S. citizen as a "China lover." The slur was immediately condemned by political and community leaders and civil rights groups including the CEO of the Anti-Defamation League. The Wall Street Journal noted "Foremost Group ships travel often to Chinese ports because much of the world’s commodity trade goes to and from China... You can’t be in the global shipping business and not travel to Chinese ports."

Some media reports questioned Elaine Chao's impartiality as Secretary of Transportation, in which role she oversaw the U.S. Maritime Administration during the first Trump administration. The Department of Transportation (DoT) regulates US-registered cargo vessels but does not regulate any foreign vessels. Foremost has no US-registered vessels and performs only international shipping; thus it is neither regulated nor promoted by DoT. According to the New York Times, investigations made no "formal finding that Ms. Chao violated ethics rules" regarding Foremost and prosecutors declined to bring any charges. The Wall Street Journal noted that "Elaine is neither an employee nor owner" of Foremost; the Washington Post's "Fact Checker" similarly reported that "Secretary Chao has no interest, ownership or involvement in the company."
