= Federal Executive Institute =

American government executive learning institute

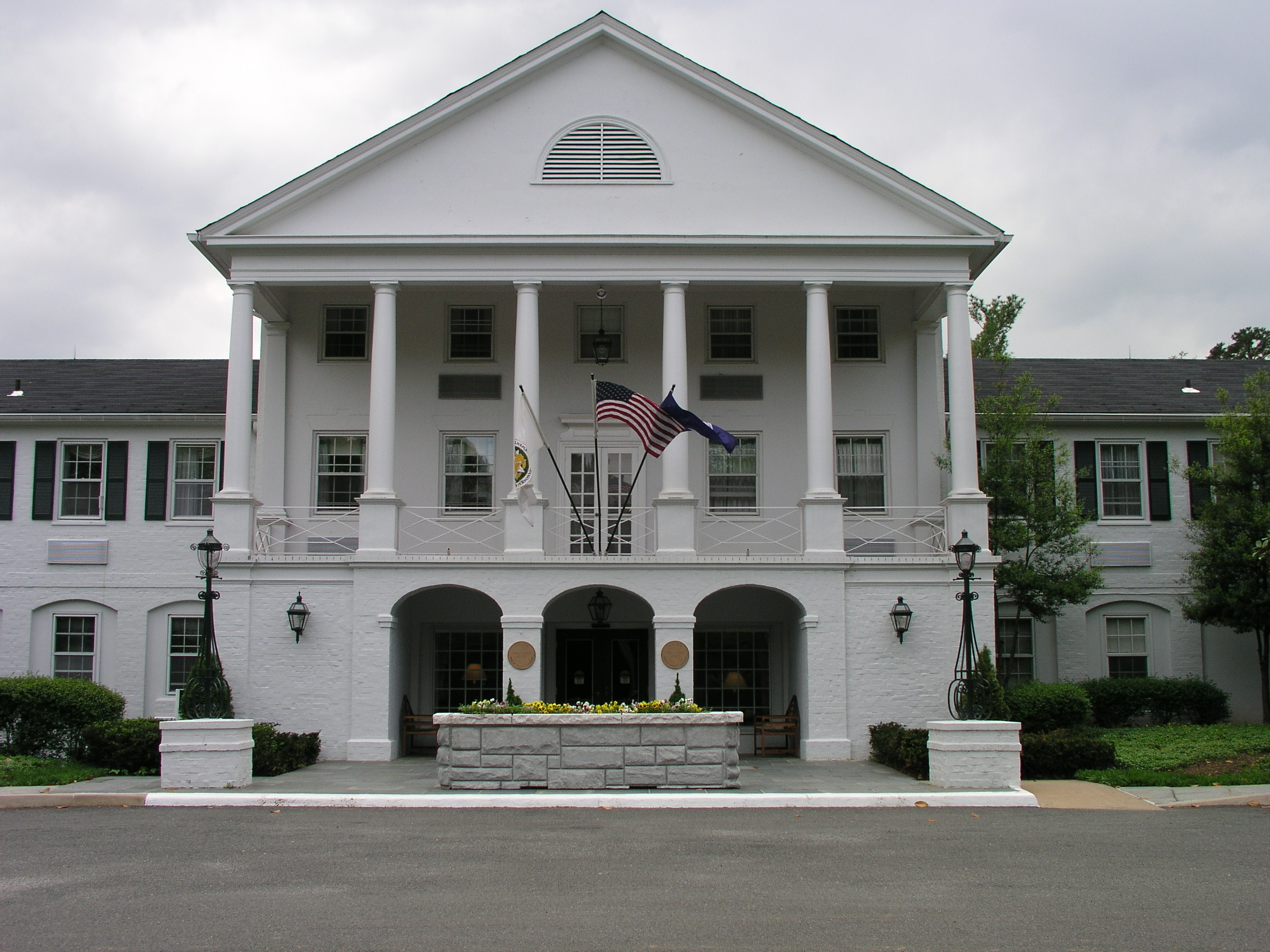
Federal Executive Institute

The Federal Executive Institute (FEI) was an executive and management development and training center for governmental leaders located on a 14-acre (57,000 m^{2}) campus near downtown Charlottesville, Virginia, less than a mile from the University of Virginia.

FEI offered values-based leadership development opportunities through an "interagency residential learning experience" which emphasized "personal growth as well as professional growth." Programs were designed specifically for public sector senior management.

== History ==
The Federal Executive Institute was founded in 1968 "to endow the career leadership levels of the federal government with the capacity and motivation to bring proactive change to a huge enterprise."

=== Background ===
In the 1950s, the federal civilian workforce was larger than it had ever been. Millions of workers had been hired to manage the programs of the New Deal in the 1930s, and more still were brought into federal service to manage the American mobilization during World War II. However, the United States had not implemented any kind of education programs to prepare federal executives to manage this expanded workforce. As a result, the Society for Personnel Administration published a proposal for a "federal staff college" in 1953. Early ideas for senior executive education were based on military models, specifically the military staff colleges which were used to prepare officers for assignments in the upper ranks, specifically as admirals and generals. The United States military had a long experience of organizing and training millions of men and it was believed by many that a similar model of continuing education should be applied to civil servants, to prepare them for more senior assignments. The first step towards the creation of such a federal staff college was taken in 1958 when Congress passed the Government Employees Training Act. The act established several precedents that became central to the formation of the Federal Executive Institute. First and foremost, it cleared the way for the establishment of an executive training center funded by its own revenues, rather than by congressional allocations. This allowed FEI freedom of maneuver and sheltered it from political storms. Second, the act gave agency directors the authority to determine how much money they would spend on executive education and where they would send their executives to be trained. This encouraged FEI to remain tied to the senior executives it was founded to serve because they constantly had to market themselves to federal agencies. Finally, the act paved the way for interagency training. Interagency interaction would become one of the hallmarks of FEI, where senior executives from various backgrounds and agencies would live and learn with each other for weeks at a time. However, it would still be approximately 10 years before FEI was founded. In the meantime, federal executives furthered their education primarily through the Brookings Institution. Additionally, the Civil Service Commission (CSC) founded two Executive Seminar Centers. The first was founded at King's Point, Long Island in 1963, and the second at Berkeley, California in 1966. Even with these centers, Chairman Macy wanted more to be done. He wanted to create an institute for those civil servants who had reached the pinnacle of their careers, the "supergrades." These people could not be motivated by further promotion and would only attend the institute in order to improve their own work and the work done by their organizations. Therefore, in August 1966 the CSC completed a proposal for a center for advanced executive study to be called the Federal Executive Institute.

=== Creating the Federal Executive Institute ===
Following President Johnson's speech, John Macy designated James Beck to coordinate the creation of the Federal Executive Institute. Beck visited potential sites for FEI including Colonial Williamsburg, Fredericksburg, Virginia, the Research Triangle Park in North Carolina, the Walter P. Chrysler Estate, and Charlottesville, Virginia. The site needed to be near a university which the faculty could partner with, a location where courses could be held and executives housed, and be within driving distance of Washington D.C. In addition to a location, the FEI needed a director. Chairman Macy was able to convince Frank Sherwood, who was Dean and teaching at the University of Southern California School of Public Administration, to come to Charlottesville as the first director of the Federal Executive Institute. Macy chose Sherwood to be the FEI's first director because he wanted someone "with academic credentials who understands something about adult learning and adult education, who had a substance of understanding about problems of the Federal executive gained through academic research and study, someone with academic status and thus able to attract staff and deal with the University of Virginia." He wanted someone who could turn his vision of a university model within the federal government into a reality. Macy and Sherwood worked exceptionally together and the two soon formed a partnership that shaped the foundational years of FEI. Both agreed that FEI should have an Advisory Board. The FEI Advisory Board provided FEI with supporters placed throughout the government who knew about FEI's mission and the unusual way it operated. When the Civil Service Commission (CSC) began leasing the Thomas Jefferson Inn, the facilities were in a state of disrepair. Though the exterior had been maintained, leaking pipes and other problems created many maintenance projects that had to be completed in a very short period of time. To help accomplish this, most of the hotel staff was kept on and became the initial FEI staff. Along with other workers, they were able to complete the most necessary repairs and prepare the facility for the first class in October 1968.

=== The first session at FEI ===
The first session at FEI began on October 13, 1968. Fifty-three executives were in attendance. All were from within the federal government and all but two were supergrades. The session lasted eight weeks, a period intended to take the executives away from the office long enough to allow them to "look seriously at themselves and their careers and to consider what changes they needed to make for the future." The curriculum fostered ways of improving executive performance in the Federal government and developing people who played those roles as high-performing leaders. A key feature of the program was executive self-direction and responsibility for learning. Program objectives were to heighten executive responsiveness to national needs and goals, to increase appreciation for the totality of the governmental system, and to improve knowledge of managerial processes. The Institute concentrated on the individual's personal growth and development but the end interest was seeing that this growth enabled the individual executive to perform more effectively as a manager.

In addition to Lectures to the Executive Community, residential sessions included seminars and workshops. To illustrate the wide range of deliberations, during the first 18 months of the Institute's operation, 26 different lecture topics were explored, many of them repeated at several sessions. The lecture subjects were: Problems Facing a City Government, Weapon Decision Making at the Top, The Changing Role of the U.S. Labor Force, the Emerging Role of Unions in the Public Service, Impact of Computers and Electronics on Education, Southeast Asia and the Great Powers, the Presidency as It Operates Today, Big Industry View of Public Policy Issues, New Federalism, the Black Explosion: National and International, Role of the Minority Party in Presidential Transitions, World Population Explosion, Education and Civil Rights, Cost Benefit Analysis: A Management Tool, Ideas and Experiences Leading Toward Organizational Development, Impact of the Budgetary Process on the Administration of the Public Sector, the Roles of the President, Policy Making and Appropriation, the Professional Staff Member of Congressional Committees, Emergency Preparedness, Model Cities, Singapore Looks on Southeast Asia, US Tax Policy, the State of the Public Service, Black Studies: Campus Phenomena, and Our Nation's Resources. (See Frank Sherwood's book The Early Years of the Federal Executive Institute, p. 117).

=== FEI within the Civil Service Commission ===
When it was founded, FEI was placed outside the mainstream CSC bureaucracy. The FEI Director reported directly to the CSC Chairman, an unusual relationship for such a small institution. Macy created this relationship so that FEI would be as independent as possible while remaining part of the government. He and his successor, Robert Hampton, ensured that this relationship was preserved. However, when Alan Campbell became Chairman of the Commission and the CSC began transitioning into the Office of Personnel Management (OPM) as per the Civil Service Reform Act of 1978 which abolished the CSC and replaced it with OPM, FEI became part of OPM's larger training program and revolving fund.

=== Dissolution ===
On February 10, 2025 President Donald Trump signed an executive order ordering the Office of Personnel Management to abolish the institute, claiming the institute led to enlargement and entrenchment of "the Washington, D.C., managerial class" and not ordinary Americans, and asserted that ending the institute would reduce federal government spending.

=== Directors ===
- Frank Sherwood (1968–73)
- Chester Newland (1973–76)
- Thomas Murphy (1976–79)
- Patrick Conklin (1979-79) Acting
- Robert Matson (1980-80) Acting
- Chester Newland (1980–1981)
- Robert Matson (1981–82) Acting
- Robert Matson (1982–87)
- Michael Hansen (1987–92)
- Patrick Conklin (1992-92) Acting
- Dee Henderson (1993–94)
- Curtis Smith (1994–1998)
- Barbara Garvin-Kester (1998–2003)
- Thomas Towberman (2003–2007)
- Joseph Enders (2007-07) Acting
- Kevin Marshall (2007–2009)
- Joe Kraemer (2009–2011) Acting
- Curtis Smith (2011 - 2012) Acting
- Kathleen McGettigan (2012) Acting
- Suzanne Logan (2012–2021)
- Henry Thibodeaux (2021-2022) Acting
- Michael Shonrock (2022–2025)

== Organization ==
Today the Federal Executive Institute (FEI) is part of the United States Office of Personnel Management (OPM). FEI is part of the OPM, Human Resources Solutions, Center for Leadership Development. FEI operates five programs of leadership development which are delivered virtually (100% online), blended, and residential when safety and health COVID restrictions permit. The five core program streams at the FEI are: Leadership for a Democratic Society (LDS), the FEI SES Leading EDGE Portfolio, Custom Executive Programs (CEP), Open Enrollment Courses (OEP), and the Center for Global Leadership (CGL). Programs, workshops, and courses are designed and administered by a team of federally employed faculty and staff. In addition, all programs are supported by adjunct faculty representing a wide spectrum of expertise.

=== Leadership for a Democratic Society ===
The four-week "Leadership for a Democratic Society" (LDS) program improves the leadership skills of senior career federal government executives to enhance their individual performance and the performance of government agencies. The program focuses on four themes: personal leadership, transforming organizations, policy in a Constitutional system, and the global context for executive action.

LDS offers federal executives a residential learning experience. Traditional sessions last four weeks while applied learning sessions consist of a two-week period at FEI, three months back at the executives' home agency, and another two weeks at FEI. This program was designed to solve the issue that many interested executives are unable to take four weeks away from work. The maximum enrollment is approximately seventy executives per session, but FEI will often see up to 750 executives complete the LDS program per year.

In addition to an intense curriculum based on Constitutional values, LDS offers a personal approach to leadership development. By incorporating 360-degree assessments, inventories of strengths and areas for improvement, and constant feedback from peers and facilitators, participants are led to a larger picture of self-awareness. Executives learn in Leadership Development Teams (LDTs) which are smaller discussion and peer consultation groups that include guidance from a professional facilitator. In addition, interagency networking is encouraged and fostered throughout the program.

The Leadership for a Democratic Society program also includes a wellness track. All participants complete a comprehensive health risk appraisal to include blood lipid profile and fitness assessment and nutritional counseling. Executives are provided with the opportunity to take fitness classes in the mornings before breakfast and during the midday break as well as during the open hours when the fitness facility is available for individual exercise. In addition, smaller breakout sessions and seminars focusing on specific health and wellness topics are offered during the program. FEI offers on-campus gym facilities as well as a volleyball court and a swimming pool.

=== Custom Executive Programs ===
In addition to LDS, elements of FEI focus on consulting and specific organizational needs within federal agencies. FEI offers open enrollment courses throughout the year in areas such as: collaborating across organizational boundaries, emotional competence, and strategic leadership. FEI also offers custom-designed programs which can be constructed to respond to an organization's specific needs.

FEI has worked with such agencies as: USAID, NOAA, NAVAIR, FAA, Department of Defense, Internal Revenue Service as well as the Army Senior Leader Development Program, the Defense Senior Leadership Development Program (DSLDP) and the President's Council on Integrity and Efficiency in the Government.

=== Open Enrollment Programs ===
FEI also offered more than two dozen open enrollment programs to federal executives at the GS15 and Senior Executive Service (SES) levels. These multi-day courses span a wide range of topics relevant to executive leaders including those which focus on individual skill development as well as organizational enhancement.

=== Center for Global Leadership ===
FEI is a founding member of the Global Leadership Consortium with the Graduate School, USDA, and the National Academy of Public Administration to support federal agencies in developing leaders who can excel in the global environment. A variety of programs are offered that enhance executives' ability to think and relate globally in their leadership approach.

== Related programs ==
FEI celebrated its 50th anniversary in October 2018. The ceremony included recognizing and honoring the founding director of the FEI, Frank P. Sherwood. An icon. Frank, in his late nineties at the time, attended the ceremony, received an award, and made remarks to the more than 200 people who gathered. FEI is part of the United States Office of Personnel Management (OPM) and falls under OPM's HR Solutions organization which functions as OPM's fee-for-service and human capital consulting division for all U.S. Federal agencies. In addition to the FEI physical campus in Charlottesville, HR Solutions, through its Center for Leadership Development of which FEI is part, has educational facilities in Washington, DC (EMDC) and staff based in Denver, Colorado (WMDC).
