= Baker Library/Bloomberg Center =

Library at Harvard Business School

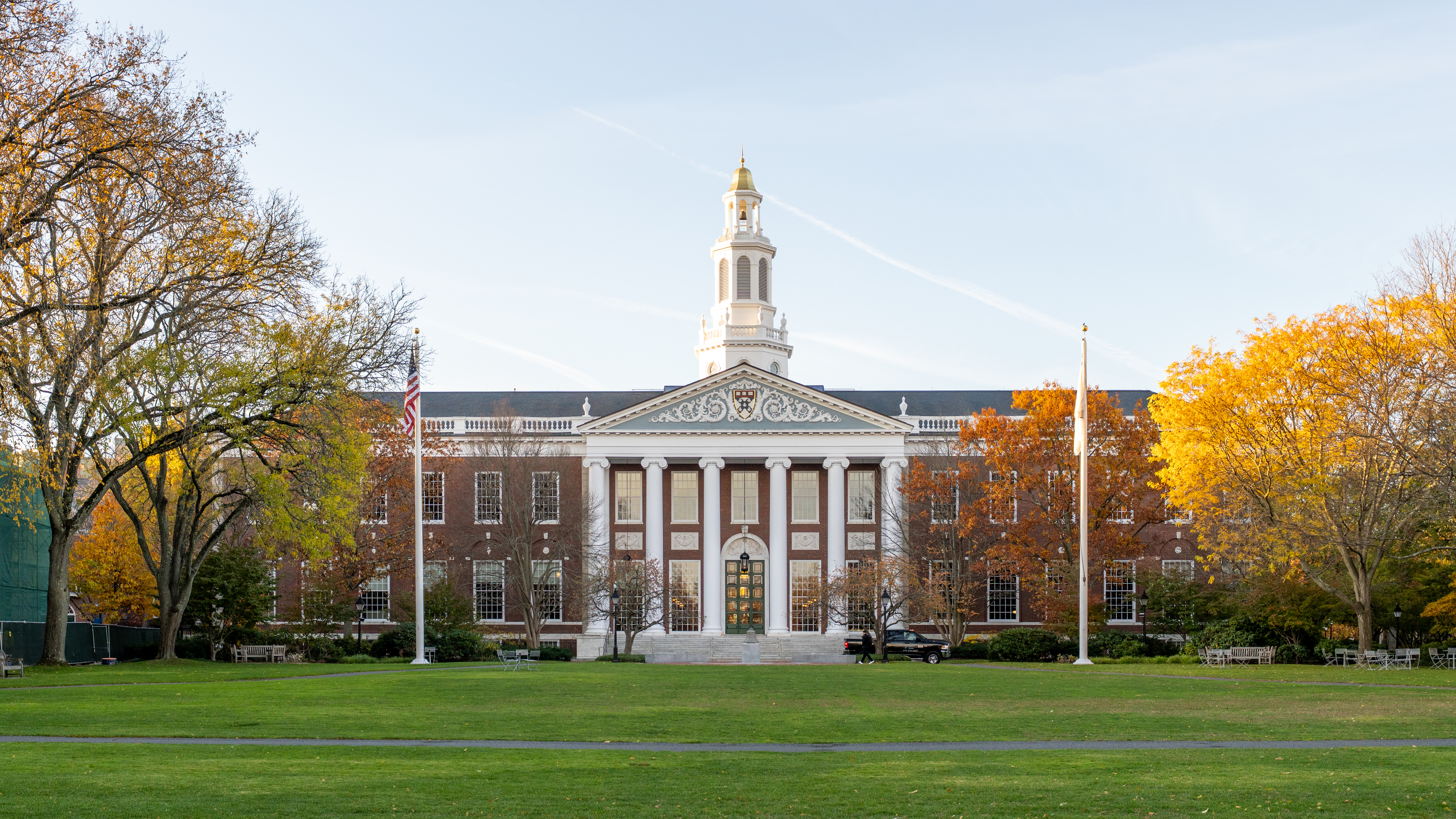
- Baker Library/Bloomberg Center at Harvard Business School in November 2025
- Interactive map of the Baker Library/Bloomberg Center area

General information
- Architectural style: Georgian Revival style
- Location: Harvard Business School, 25 Harvard Way, Allston, Boston, Massachusetts, U.S.
- Coordinates: 42°21′59.29″N 71°7′22.12″W
- Named for: George Fisher Baker; William Henry Bloomberg
- Completed: 1927
- Renovated: 2005
- Renovation cost: $53.4 million
- Owner: Harvard University

Technical details
- Floor area: 168,000 square feet (15,600 m^{2})

Design and construction
- Architect: McKim, Mead & White

Renovating team
- Architect: Robert A. M. Stern Architects

The Baker Library/Bloomberg Center is a building complex at Harvard Business School on the campus of Harvard University in the Allston neighborhood of Boston, Massachusetts, United States. It includes the Baker Library, built in 1927, and the Bloomberg Center, completed in 2005.

== History ==
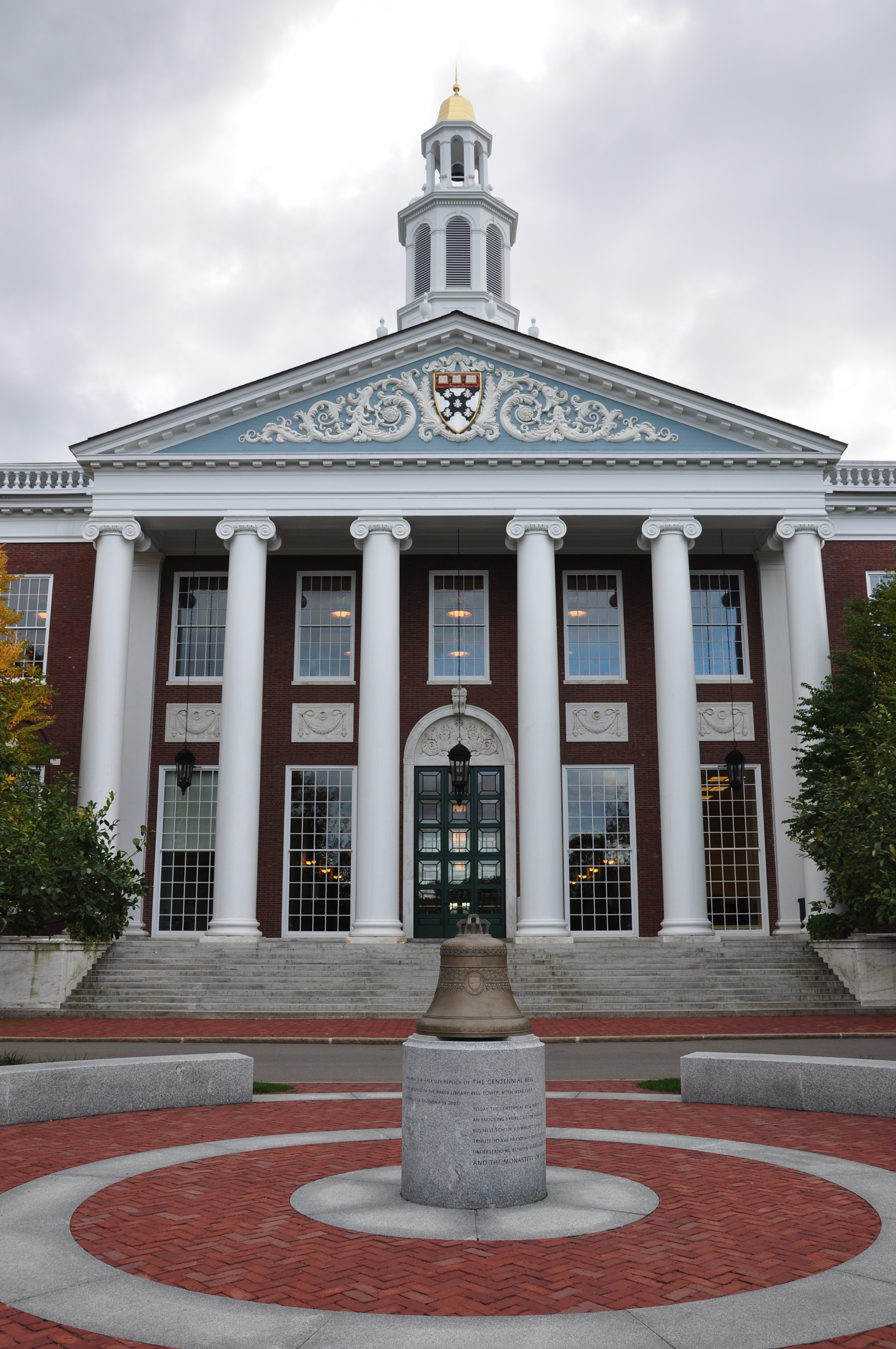
The Baker Library

The construction of the Baker Library was completed in 1927. It was named for philanthropist George Fisher Baker. From 1930 to 2007, the bell in the tower came from the Danilov Monastery in Moscow, Russia; it had been donated by Charles Richard Crane.

The Bloomberg Center was built in 2003–2005. It was named for billionaire alumnus Michael R. Bloomberg's father, William Henry Bloomberg.

== Architecture ==
The 1927 building was designed in the Georgian Revival style by McKim, Mead & White. The 2005 expansion was designed by Robert A.M. Stern Architects and cost $53.4 million. The complex includes 67 faculty offices, the de Gaspé Beaubien Reading Room, named for alumnus Philippe de Gaspé Beaubien, the Stamps Reading Room and the Frist Faculty Commons, named for philanthropist Thomas F. Frist Jr.

== Library collections ==
The library collections contain many rare books and documents of business history.

== See also ==
- Spangler Center
