= East Asian name =

East Asian name may refer to:

- Chinese name
  - Chinese surname
  - Chinese given name
  - List of common Chinese surnames
- Japanese name
  - List of common Japanese surnames
- Korean name
  - List of Korean surnames
- Vietnamese name

== See also ==
- Generation name
