= Harvard Business School =

Business school of Harvard University

- Coat of arms
- Type: Private graduate business school
- Established: 1908; 118 years ago
- Parent institution: Harvard University
- Accreditation: AACSB International
- Endowment: US$3.8 billion (2020)
- Dean: Srikant Datar
- Faculty: 244 (2020)
- Administrative staff: 1,989 (2020)
- Students: 865 (732 MBA)
- Location: Allston, Massachusetts, United States; 42°22′02″N 71°07′21″W
- Campus: Urban
- Website: hbs.edu

Harvard Business School (HBS) is the graduate business school of Harvard University, a private Ivy League research university. Located in Allston, Massachusetts, HBS owns Harvard Business Publishing, which publishes business books, leadership articles, case studies, and Harvard Business Review, a monthly academic business magazine. It is also home to the Baker Library/Bloomberg Center, the school's primary library. Harvard Business School is one of six Ivy League business schools. HBS is part of the M7 group of business schools recognized as having strong MBA programs, that are often highly-ranked in US MBA rankings.

== History ==
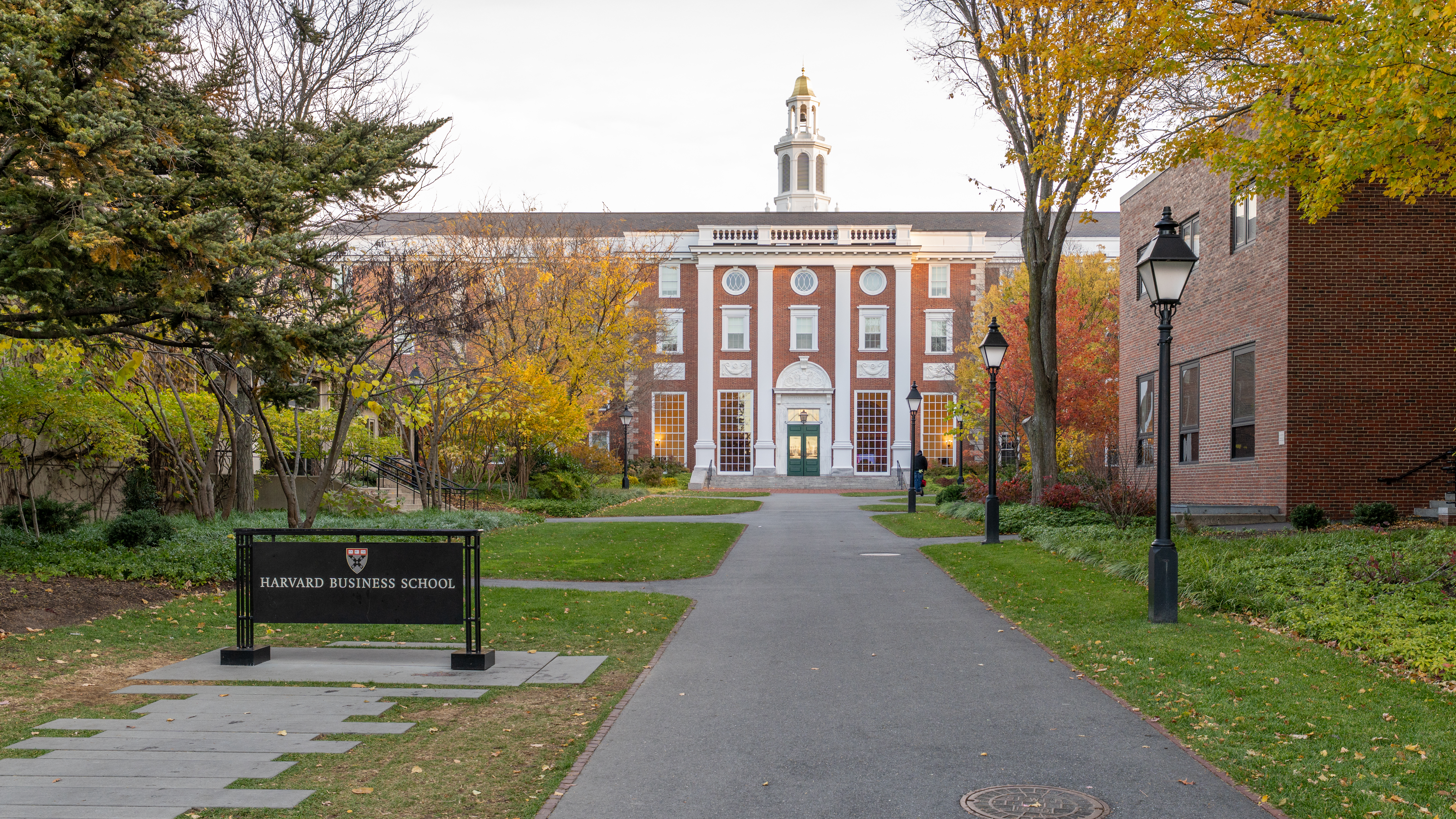
Baker Library/Bloomberg Center

The school was established in 1908. Initially established by the humanities faculty, it received independent status in 1910, and became a separate administrative unit in 1913. The first dean was historian Edwin Francis Gay (1867–1946). Yogev (2001) explains the original concept:

This school of business and public administration was originally conceived as a school for diplomacy and government service on the model of the French Ecole des Sciences Politiques. The goal was an institution of higher learning that would offer a Master of Arts degree in the humanities field, with a major in business. In discussions about the curriculum, the suggestion was made to concentrate on specific business topics such as banking, railroads, and so on... Professor Lowell said the school would train qualified public administrators whom the government would have no choice but to employ, thereby building a better public administration... Harvard was blazing a new trail by educating young people for a career in business, just as its medical school trained doctors and its law faculty trained lawyers.

The business school pioneered the development of the case method of teaching, drawing inspiration from this approach to legal education at Harvard. Cases are typically descriptions of real events in organizations. They are written by school faculty members who earn royalties on their sales. Students are positioned as managers and are presented with problems which they need to analyze and provide recommendations on.

From its inception, the school enjoyed a close relationship with the corporate world. Within a few years of its founding many business leaders were its alumni and were hiring other alumni for entry-level positions in their firms.

At its founding, the school accepted only male students. The Training Course in Personnel Administration, founded at Radcliffe College in 1937, was the beginning of business training for women at Harvard. HBS took over administration of that program from Radcliffe in 1954. In 1959, alumnae of the one-year program (by then known as the Harvard-Radcliffe Program in Business Administration) were permitted to apply to join the HBS MBA program as second-years. In December 1962, the faculty voted to allow women to enter the MBA program directly. The first women to apply directly to the MBA program matriculated in September 1963.

Harvard Business School played a role in the founding of the first business schools in the United Kingdom, delivering six-week Advanced Management Program courses alongside local staff at Durham in 1964, Bangor in 1965 and at Strathclyde in 1966. It also brought in professors from the newly founded British business schools to see how teaching was carried out at Harvard via an International Teachers Program.

In 2012–2013, HBS administration implemented new programs and practices to improve the experience of female students and recruit more female professors.

=== International research centers ===
HBS established nine global research centers and four regional offices and functions through offices in Asia Pacific (Hong Kong, Shanghai, Singapore), United States (San Francisco Bay Area, CA), Europe (Paris, opened in 2003), South Asia (India), Middle East and North Africa (Dubai, Istanbul, Tel Aviv), Japan and Latin America (Montevideo, Mexico City, São Paulo).

== Rankings ==
Business school rankings

United States
- QS MBA: 2
- Financial Times MBA: 4
- Bloomberg MBA: 3
- USNWR MBA: 4
- THE Business: 4

Global
- QS MBA: 2
- Financial Times MBA: 10
- THE Business: 8

As of 2022, HBS was ranked fifth in the nation by U.S. News & World Report, third in the world by the Financial Times, and second in the world by QS World University Rankings.

== Academic life ==
Most full-time students study for an MBA, although doctoral programs are also undertaken. Executive education is provided, and online courses are also available.

Baker Scholars are those MBA students with academic honors over the two-year course in the top 5% of their year class.

== Student life ==
HBS students can join more than 95 different clubs and student organizations on campus. The Student Association (SA) is the main interface between the MBA student body and the faculty/administration. In addition, the HBS student body is represented at the university level by the Harvard Graduate Council.

== Executive education ==
In 2015, executive education contributed $168 million to HBS's total revenue of $707 million. This included:

- The Advanced Management Program, a seven-week residential program for senior executives with the stated aim to "Prepare for the Highest Level of Leadership".
- The General Management Program, a four-month intensive residential program for senior executives who are general managers or within range of such position in their organizations.
- The Program for Leadership Development, an Executive-MBA alternative is a seven-month residential program for accelerating the careers of high-potential leaders and emerging executives.
- The Owner/President Management Program, three three-week "units" spread over two years that is marketed to "business owners and entrepreneurs".
- Harvard Business School Online, launched in 2014 as HBX, offers flexible certificate and credential programs taught by Harvard Business School faculty and delivered via an online platform.
- The Summer Venture in Management Program, a one-week management training program for rising college seniors designed to increase diversity and opportunity in business education. Participants must be employed in a summer internship and be nominated by and have sponsorship from their organization to attend.

== Academic units ==
The school's faculty are divided into 10 academic units: Accounting and Management; Business, Government and the International Economy; Entrepreneurial Management; Finance; General Management; Marketing; Negotiation, Organizations and Markets; Organizational Behavior; Strategy; and Technology and Operations Management.

== Buildings ==
Older buildings include the 1927-built Morgan Hall, named for J. P. Morgan, and 1940-built Loeb House, named for John L. Loeb Sr. and his son (both designed by McKim, Mead & White), and Burden Hall, a 900-seat auditorium completed in 1971 that served as the School's principal venue for large classes and events until it was decommissioned and demolished in the late 2010s.

Interior of Klarman Hall, a 1,000-seat convening center at Harvard Business School.

Klarman Hall, a large convening center located next to the Spangler Center on the site of the former Burden Hall, opened in 2018. The center, funded by alumni Seth Klarman's Klarman Family Foundation, was designed by William Rawn Associates and built by Walsh Brothers. The building provides roughly 80,000–120,000 square feet of space and a 1,000-seat auditorium that can host an entire M.B.A. class for conferences, performances and University-wide events. Its tiered seating and case-method acoustics are designed to support discussion in large groups, and the main hall features a curved fine-pitch LED video wall that can display multiple high-resolution sources for hybrid teaching and events. The demolition of Burden Hall allowed the creation of Burden Park, a landscaped open space that, together with Klarman Hall and nearby pavilions, forms a new southern gateway to the campus.

In the fall of 2010, Tata Group-related companies and charities donated $50 million for the construction of an executive center. The executive center was named as Tata Hall, after Ratan Tata (AMP, 1975), the chairman of Tata Sons. The total construction costs have been estimated at $100 million. Tata Hall is located in the northeast corner of the HBS campus. The facility is devoted to the Harvard Business School's Executive Education programs. At seven stories tall with about 150,000 gross square feet, it contains about 180 bedrooms for education students, in addition to academic and multi-purpose spaces.

Kresge Way was located by the base of the former Kresge Hall, and is named for Sebastian S. Kresge. In 2014, Kresge Hall was replaced by a new hall that was funded by a US$30 million donation by the family of the late Ruth Mulan Chu Chao, whose four daughters all attended Harvard Business School. The Executive Education quad currently includes McArthur, Baker, and Mellon Halls (residences), McCollum and Hawes (classrooms), Chao Center, and Glass (administration).

Most of the HBS buildings are connected by a color-coded basement tunnel system which is open to pedestrian traffic. Tunnels open to maintenance workers only carry steam pipes to the rest of the campus, and connect Kresge with the Blackstone steam plant in Cambridge, via the Weeks Footbridge.

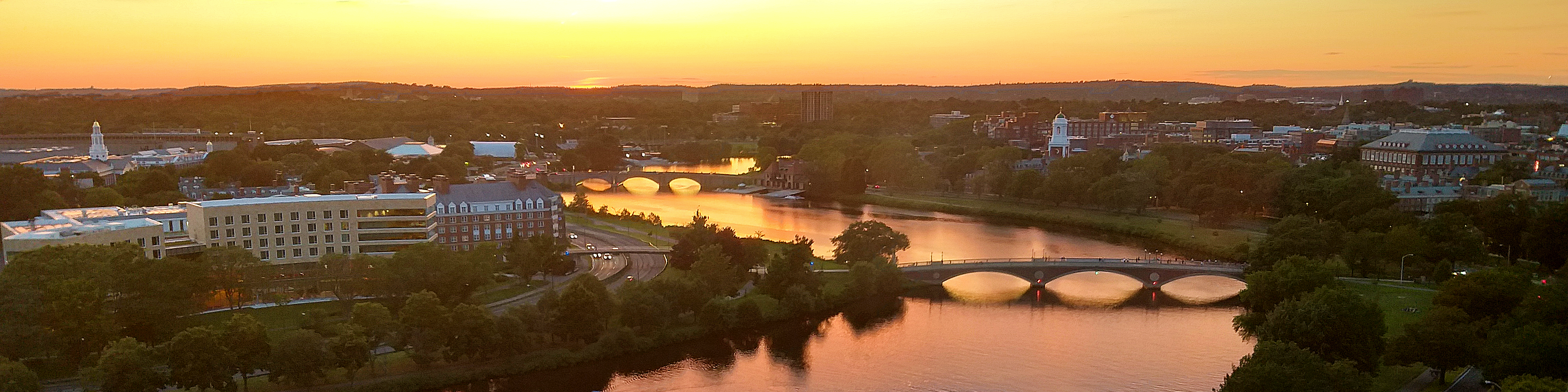
Weeks Footbridge crossing the Charles River at sunset with Harvard Business School on the left and Harvard Kennedy School on the right

== See also ==
- Category:Harvard Business School alumni
- List of Harvard University people
- List of Ivy League business schools
- Spangler Center
