= Chad Meredith =

American judge (born 1981)

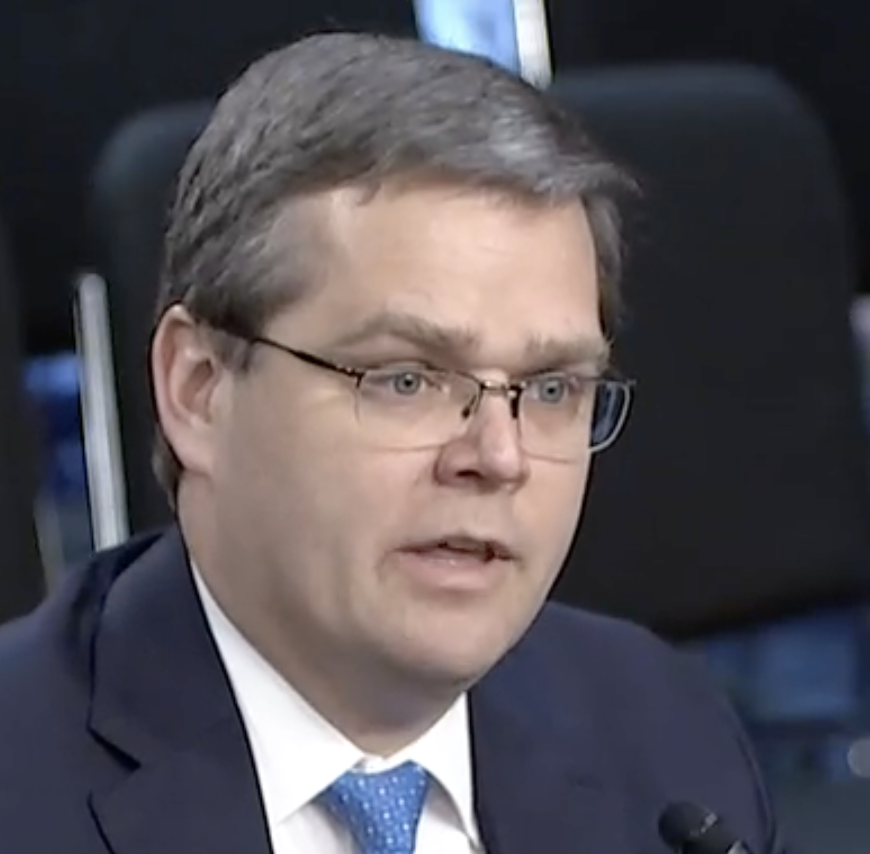
- Meredith in 2025

Judge of the United States District Court for the Eastern District of Kentucky
- Incumbent
- Assumed office November 3, 2025
- Appointed by: Donald Trump
- Preceded by: Danny C. Reeves

1st Solicitor General of Kentucky
- In office 2019–2021
- Preceded by: position established
- Succeeded by: Matt Kuhn

Personal details
- Born: Stephen Chad Meredith; 1981 (age 44–45) Lexington, Kentucky, U.S.
- Party: Republican
- Relations: Stephen Meredith (father)
- Education: Washington and Lee University (BA); University of Kentucky (JD)

Stephen Chad Meredith (born 1981) is a United States district judge of the District Court for the Eastern District of Kentucky. He previously served as the first solicitor general of Kentucky from 2019 to 2021.

== Early life and education ==
A native of Lexington, Kentucky, Meredith is the son of Stephen Meredith, a member of the Kentucky Senate. Meredith earned a Bachelor of Arts degree, summa cum laude, from Washington and Lee University in 2004. While at Washington and Lee, Meredith was inducted as a member of the Phi Beta Kappa and Omicron Delta Kappa honor societies. He earned his Juris Doctor, summa cum laude and Order of the Coif, from the University of Kentucky College of Law in 2007.

Meredith is a member of the Federalist Society.

== Career ==
=== Counsel to Governor Bevin and Solicitor General ===
After law school, Meredith served as a law clerk for Judge John M. Rogers and Judge Amul Thapar before joining Frost Brown Todd as a litigator. He later worked for Ransdell & Roach before joining the administration of Governor Matt Bevin in 2015 as chief deputy general counsel. In December 2019, Attorney General Daniel Cameron appointed Meredith as the commonwealth's first solicitor general, a position he would continue to hold until 2021.

=== Consideration for judicial nomination in first Trump administration ===
In 2020, Meredith was vetted to possibly be nominated by President Donald Trump to the United States District Court for the Western District of Kentucky following the elevation of Judge Justin R. Walker to the United States Court of Appeals for the District of Columbia Circuit. However, Meredith was passed over in favor of Benjamin Beaton. Following this, Meredith joined Squire Patton Boggs as of counsel to their global litigation practice group.

=== Consideration for nomination under Biden ===
In late-June 2022, it was reported that President Joe Biden would nominate Meredith to serve as a judge of the United States District Court for the Eastern District of Kentucky. The nomination announcement was originally scheduled for June 24, the same day the Dobbs v. Jackson Women's Health Organization decision was released. The plan to nominate Meredith, which was struck between Biden and Senate Minority Leader Mitch McConnell, was criticized by Democrats due to Meredith's anti-abortion stances. Despite McConnell's support, the nomination was never formally put forward by Biden in accordance with the blue slip rule due to opposition from Senator Rand Paul.

=== Nomination to district court under Trump ===
On June 18, 2025, President Trump announced his intention to nominate Meredith to the United States District Court for the Eastern District of Kentucky to a seat vacated by Judge Danny C. Reeves. The nomination was formally transmitted to the United States Senate on June 23, 2025, was approved by the United States Senate Committee on the Judiciary on September 11 by a 12–10 vote. Paul stated that he would support Meredith's nomination despite his previous opposition in 2022. On October 22, 2025, the Senate invoked cloture on his nomination by a 52–45 vote. The next day, the Senate voted to confirm his nomination by a 48–45 vote. He received his judicial commission on November 3, 2025.

== Publications ==
- Meredith, S. Chad (2006). "Look Homeward Candidate: Evaluating and Reforming Kentucky's Residency Definition and Bona Fides Challenges in Order to Avoid a Potential Crisis in Gubernatorial Elections". Kentucky Law Journal. 95 (1): 211–40.

Legal offices
| Preceded by Danny C. Reeves | Judge of the United States District Court for the Eastern District of Kentucky; 2025–present | Incumbent |
