= List of first minority male lawyers and judges in Kentucky =

This is a list of the first minority male lawyer(s) and judge(s) in Kentucky. It includes the year in which the men were admitted to practice law (in parentheses). Also included are men who achieved other distinctions such becoming the first in their state to graduate from law school or become a political figure.

== Firsts in Kentucky's history ==
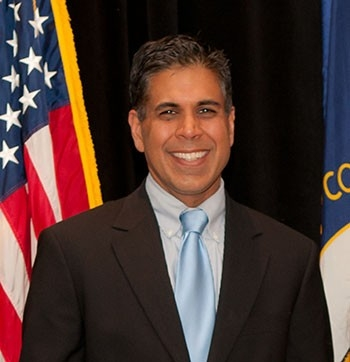
Amul Thapar: First South Asian American male Judge of the U.S. District Court for the Eastern District of Kentucky (2007)

=== Lawyers ===
- First African American male: Nathaniel Harper (1871)
- First African male admitted to practice before the Kentucky Court of Appeals: James W. Schooler in 1888

=== State judges ===
- First African American male: Nathaniel Harper (1871) in 1888
- First Jewish American male (Kentucky Court of Appeals): Samuel Steinfeld in 1966
- First African American male (circuit court): Benjamin Shobe in 1976
- First African American male (Kentucky Supreme Court): William E. McAnulty Jr. in 2006
- First blind male: David Holton in 2008
- First Latino American male: Daniel "Danny" Alvarez in 2018
- First openly gay male (family court): Bryan Gatewood in 2017

=== Federal judges ===
- First South Asian American male (U.S. District Court for the Eastern District of Kentucky): Amul Thapar (1994) in 2007

=== Attorney General of Kentucky ===
- First African American male: Daniel Cameron in 2019

=== Assistant Attorney General ===
- First African American male: Darryl T. Owens

=== United States Attorney ===
- First African American male: Steven S. Reed in 1999

=== Assistant United States Attorney ===
- First African American male (Eastern District of Kentucky): Jesse Crenshaw in 1978

=== Kentucky Bar Association ===
- First Jewish American male president: Fred Stepner around 1999

=== Faculty ===
- First African American male law school dean: David A. Brennen in 2009

== Firsts in local history ==
- C.S. Manies (c. 1895): First African American male admitted to the Glasgow County Bar Association [Barren County, Kentucky]
- Claybron W. Merriweather (1908): First African American male lawyer in Hopkinsville, Christian County, Kentucky
- James Chiles (1890): First African American male lawyer in Lexington, Fayette County, Kentucky
- Gary D. Payne: First African American male judge in Fayette County, Kentucky (1988)
- Charles J. Lunderman, Jr.: First African American male appointed as Jefferson County Quarterly Judge (1961)
- Benjamin Shobe: First African American male appointed as a Judge of the Circuit Court in Jefferson County, Kentucky (1976)
- Eric Haner: First openly gay male judge in Jefferson County, Kentucky (2014)
- Bryan Gatewood: First openly gay male to serve as a Judge of the Jefferson Family Court (2017)
- Charles Leon Taylor: First African American male magistrate in Keene, Jessamine County, Kentucky
- Charles Neblett: First African American male magistrate in Logan County, Kentucky
- Cedric Burnam: First African American male magistrate in Warren County, Kentucky (2002)

== See also ==
- List of first minority male lawyers and judges in the United States

== Other topics of interest ==
- List of first women lawyers and judges in the United States
- List of first women lawyers and judge in Kentucky
