= Gregory F. Van Tatenhove =

American judge (born 1960)

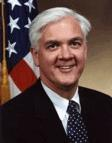
- Van Tatenhove, c. 2006

Dean of the University of Kentucky Rosenberg College of Law
- Incumbent
- Assumed office July 20, 2026
- Preceded by: James C. Duff (acting)

Judge of the United States District Court for the Eastern District of Kentucky
- In office January 5, 2006 – July 19, 2026
- Appointed by: George W. Bush
- Preceded by: Karl Spillman Forester
- Succeeded by: Vacant

United States Attorney for the Eastern District of Kentucky
- In office 2001–2005
- President: George W. Bush
- Preceded by: Joseph Leslie Famularo
- Succeeded by: Amul Thapar

Personal details
- Born: Gregory Frederick Van Tatenhove; April 2, 1960 (age 66) Los Angeles, California, U.S.
- Education: Asbury College (BA); University of Kentucky (JD)

Gregory Frederick Van Tatenhove (born April 2, 1960) is an American attorney, jurist, and academic administrator who has served as dean of the University of Kentucky Rosenberg College of Law since July 20, 2026.

He previously served as a United States district judge of the United States District Court for the Eastern District of Kentucky from 2006 to 2026, and as the United States attorney for the district from 2001 to 2005.

== Early life and career ==
Van Tatenhove was born in Los Angeles, California. He attended high school in Jessamine County, Kentucky, and received a Bachelor of Arts degree from Asbury College (now Asbury University) in 1982. He was then a legislative Senate aide of Mitch McConnell.

He attended the University of Kentucky College of Law where he obtained a Juris Doctor degree in 1989. He was a law clerk for Judge Eugene Edward Siler Jr. of the United States District Court for the Eastern District of Kentucky, from 1989 to 1990. Van Tatenhove served as a trial attorney for the US Department of Justice, Federal Programs Branch, from 1990 to 1994. From 1994 to 2001, he was chief of staff and legal counsel for congressman Ron Lewis. In 2001, George W. Bush appointed him as United States attorney for the Eastern District of Kentucky, a post he held from 2001 to 2005.

== Federal judicial service ==
On September 13, 2005, on the recommendation of Senators Jim Bunning and Mitch McConnell, President George W. Bush nominated Van Tatenhove to fill a seat on the United States District Court for the Eastern District of Kentucky previously held by Judge Karl Spillman Forester. A majority of the American Bar Association Standing Committee on the Federal Judiciary rated Van Tatenhove not qualified, citing a lack of trial experience.

Van Tatenhove was confirmed by the United States Senate on December 21, 2005, and received his commission on January 5, 2006. He retired from the court on July 19, 2026.

Kentucky Attorney General Daniel Cameron was a law clerk for Van Tatenhove for two years, in 2011–13. Upon Cameron's election to Kentucky Attorney General, Van Tatenhove swore him into office.

=== Notable cases ===
On October 11, 2014, Van Tatenhove held that Kentucky Educational Television did not have to allow a Libertarian candidate to be part of a debate with Mitch McConnell and Alison Lundergan Grimes, the candidate's opponents in a battle to be elected US Senator. The chair of the Kentucky Libertarian Party said he was disgusted with the judge's ruling, given that the TV station had changed its standards for inclusion in the debate mid-stream.

On January 25, 2016, Van Tatenhove ruled in favor of the Christian apologetics, anti-evolution organization, Answers in Genesis, in the case of Ark Encounter vs. Bob Stewart, ordering the state to process the application for the tax rebate incentives for the Ark Encounter theme park that would become available once the attraction opened.

On March 30, 2018, he ruled that Governor Bevin did not violate the 1st amendment when he blocked viewers from his Facebook and Twitter accounts due to their political beliefs. His ruling contradicted a similar ruling that stated that then-president Donald Trump had violated the 1st amendment when blocking individuals from his Twitter account due to their political beliefs.

On May 8, 2020, Van Tatenhove, in a later-overturned opinion, ruled that Kentucky churches could hold in-person services during the COVID-19 pandemic in Kentucky starting May 10. In his ruling, he said that in-person meeting was essential for the church, writing "The orders at issue do not simply restrict religious expression; they restrict religious expression in an attempt to protect the public health during a global pandemic." However, a unanimous three-judge panel of the United States Court of Appeals for the Sixth Circuit stayed Van Tatenhove's ruling, and overturned his injunction while an appeal moved forward. Senator Mitch McConnell and 37 other senators filed a brief supporting Van Tatenhove's opinion. In December 2020, the US Supreme Court overturned Van Tatenhove's ruling.

== University of Kentucky College of Law deanship ==
=== Appointment and controversy ===
On March 6, 2026, it was announced that that University of Kentucky provost Robert S. DiPaola selected Van Tatenhove as the next dean of the University of Kentucky Rosenberg College of Law.

On March 12, it was reported to university president Eli Capilouto that a "substantial majority" of law school faculty had expressed disapproval of Van Tatenhove's suitability for the position, voting him as the only "unacceptable" candidate among four job finalists. On April 21, Kentucky Governor Andy Beshear posted on social media that he was "losing confidence and growing increasingly concerned" with the University of Kentucky's hiring process following the appointment of Van Tatenhove. Beshear indicated that the University of Kentucky appointed Van Tatenhove after they amended their policies to no longer require the board of trustees to approve the hiring of deans. This requirement was reinstated by the board on June 30, but did not affect Van Tatenhove's appointment.

In an op-ed written by state representative and UK alumni Nick Wilson, he defended Van Tatenhove's record and capabilities while alleging that Beshear's critiques were based on partisanship.

Just prior to assuming the deanship on July 20, UK Law professor Ramsi Woodcock filed a lawsuit against Van Tatenhove, Capiluto, and DiaPaola to halt Van Tatenhove's appointment. Woodcock, who had been suspended from his teaching duties for over a year due to controversial public statements he had made concerning Israel, alleged that Van Tatenhove's appointment violated his employment contract by endangering the school's accreditation by the American Bar Association.

== Personal life ==
In 2018, Van Tatenhove married Christine Trout. A native of Letcher County, Trout is an attorney who currently serves as general counsel to Kentucky House Speaker David W. Osborne. She previously served as commissioner of the Kentucky Department of Alcoholic Beverage Control (ABC) during the administration of governor Matt Bevin and as chief of staff for the state's personnel cabinet.

== Sources ==
Legal offices
Preceded by Karl Spillman Forester	Judge of the United States District Court for the Eastern District of Kentucky; 2006–2026	Vacant
