= Robert E. Wier =

American judge (born 1967)

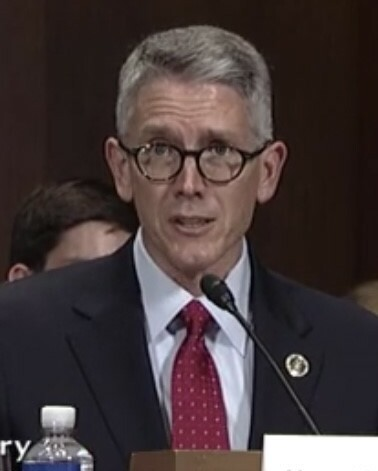

Judge of the United States District Court for the Eastern District of Kentucky
- Incumbent
- Assumed office June 12, 2018
- Appointed by: Donald Trump
- Preceded by: Amul Thapar

Magistrate Judge of the United States District Court for the Eastern District of Kentucky
- In office September 1, 2006 – June 12, 2018
- Succeeded by: Matthew A. Stinnett

Personal details
- Born: 1967 (age 58–59) Harlan, Kentucky, U.S.
- Education: University of Kentucky (BA, JD)

Robert Earl Wier (born 1967) is a United States district judge of the United States District Court for the Eastern District of Kentucky.

== Biography ==
Wier received his Bachelor of Arts with high distinction and departmental honors, from the University of Kentucky, and his Juris Doctor, with high distinction, from the University of Kentucky College of Law, where he was valedictorian, and served as editor-in-chief of the Kentucky Law Journal.

Wier started his legal career serving as a law clerk to Judge Eugene Edward Siler Jr. of the United States Court of Appeals for the Sixth Circuit.

Prior to his judicial service, he worked in private practice as a member of the law firm Ransdell & Wier PLLC and, before that, as an associate with the Lexington, Kentucky, law firm Stoll, Keenon & Park.

== Federal judicial service ==
Wier served as a magistrate judge of the United States District Court for the Eastern District of Kentucky before becoming a district judge, a position to which he was first appointed on September 1, 2006, and reappointed in 2014. Wier's service as a magistrate terminated when he was elevated to district court judge.

On August 3, 2017, President Donald Trump nominated Wier to serve as a United States District Judge of the United States District Court for the Eastern District of Kentucky, to the seat vacated by Judge Amul Thapar, who was elevated to the United States Court of Appeals for the Sixth Circuit on May 25, 2017. A hearing on his nomination before the Senate Judiciary Committee took place on November 15, 2017. On December 7, 2017, his nomination was reported out of committee by voice vote. On June 4, 2018, the United States Senate invoked cloture on his nomination by a 90–1 vote. On June 5, 2018, Wier's nomination was confirmed by a 95–0 vote. He received his judicial commission on June 12, 2018.

Legal offices
| Preceded by Amul Thapar | Judge of the United States District Court for the Eastern District of Kentucky; 2018–present | Incumbent |
