= Danny C. Reeves =

American judge (born 1957)

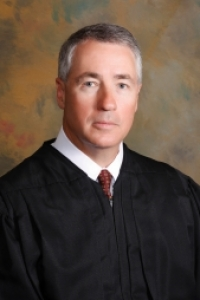

Senior Judge of the United States District Court for the Eastern District of Kentucky
- Incumbent
- Assumed office February 1, 2025

Member of the United States Sentencing Commission
- In office March 21, 2017 – March 21, 2021
- Preceded by: Ricardo Hinojosa
- Succeeded by: Claire McCusker Murray

Chief Judge of the United States District Court for the Eastern District of Kentucky
- In office August 16, 2019 – February 1, 2025
- Preceded by: Karen K. Caldwell
- Succeeded by: David Bunning

Judge of the United States District Court for the Eastern District of Kentucky
- In office December 10, 2001 – February 1, 2025
- Appointed by: George W. Bush
- Preceded by: Seat established by 114 Stat. 2762
- Succeeded by: Chad Meredith

Personal details
- Born: Danny Clyde Reeves; 1957 (age 68–69) Corbin, Kentucky, U.S.
- Education: Eastern Kentucky University (BA); Salmon P. Chase College of Law (JD)

Danny Clyde Reeves (born 1957) is a senior United States district judge of the United States District Court for the Eastern District of Kentucky.

== Early life and education ==
Born in Corbin, Kentucky, Reeves received a Bachelor of Arts degree from Eastern Kentucky University in 1978 and a Juris Doctor from Salmon P. Chase College of Law at Northern Kentucky University in 1981. During his undergraduate and law school years, Reeves had summer jobs at a coal mine and General Motors assembly factory.

He was a law clerk to Judge Eugene E. Siler, Jr. of the United States District Court for the Eastern & Western Districts of Kentucky from 1981 to 1983. He was in private practice with the Lexington, Kentucky law firm Greenebaum Doll & McDonald from 1983 to 2001, starting as an associate before being promoted to partner in 1988.

=== Federal judicial service ===
On September 4, 2001, Reeves was nominated by President George W. Bush to serve as a United States district judge of the United States District Court for the Eastern District of Kentucky. He was nominated to a new seat created by 114 Stat. 2762. He was confirmed by the United States Senate on December 6, 2001, and received his commission on December 10, 2001. He became chief judge on August 16, 2019. He assumed senior status on February 1, 2025.

=== United States Sentencing Commission ===
On March 15, 2016, President Barack Obama nominated Reeves for a position on the United States Sentencing Commission, which would expire on October 31, 2021. On July 13, 2016, a hearing on his nomination was held before the Senate Judiciary Committee. His nomination expired with the end of the 114th Congress on January 3, 2017. He was renominated by President Obama on January 17, 2017. His nomination was withdrawn by President Donald Trump on February 28, 2017, but Trump renominated him on March 1, 2017. On March 9, 2017, his nomination was reported out of committee. On March 21, 2017, his nomination was confirmed by a 98–0 vote. His term ended in March 2021.

=== Title IX case ===
In January 2025, Reeves blocked the Biden administration's Title IX rule, which would have amended the federal government's definition of sex to include gender identity. Judge Reeves found the rule to be "arbitrary and capricious" and concluded that it “conflict[ed] with the plain language of Title IX.”

== Sources ==
Legal offices
Preceded by Seat established by 114 Stat. 2762	Judge of the United States District Court for the Eastern District of Kentucky; 2001–2025	Succeeded by Chad Meredith
Preceded by Karen K. Caldwell	Chief Judge of the United States District Court for the Eastern District of Kentucky; 2019–2025	Succeeded by David Bunning
