= Andrew McConnell January Cochran =

American judge (1854–1934)

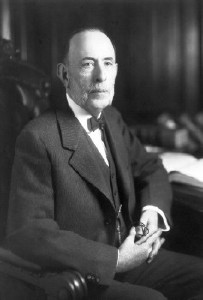

Judge of the United States District Court for the Eastern District of Kentucky
- In office April 24, 1901 – June 12, 1934
- Appointed by: William McKinley (recess); Theodore Roosevelt (commission)
- Preceded by: Seat established by 31 Stat. 781
- Succeeded by: Hiram Church Ford

Personal details
- Born: Andrew McConnell January Cochran; February 4, 1854 Maysville, Kentucky, U.S.
- Died: June 12, 1934 (aged 80)
- Education: Centre College (A.B.); Harvard Law School (LL.B.)

Andrew McConnell January Cochran (February 4, 1854 – June 12, 1934) was a United States district judge of the United States District Court for the Eastern District of Kentucky.

== Education and career ==
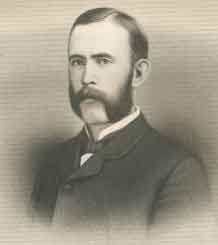
Sketch of Cochran, c. 1897

Born in Maysville, Kentucky, Cochran received an Artium Baccalaureus degree from Centre College in 1873 and a Bachelor of Laws from Harvard Law School in 1877. He was in private practice in Maysville from 1877 to 1901.

== Federal judicial service ==
Cochran received a recess appointment from President William McKinley on April 24, 1901, to the United States District Court for the Eastern District of Kentucky, to a new seat authorized by 31 Stat. 781. He was nominated to the same position by President Theodore Roosevelt on December 5, 1901. He was confirmed by the United States Senate on December 17, 1901, and received his commission the same day. His service terminated on June 12, 1934, due to his death.

== See also ==
- List of United States federal judges by longevity of service

== Sources ==
Legal offices
Preceded by Seat established by 31 Stat. 781	Judge of the United States District Court for the Eastern District of Kentucky; 1901–1934	Succeeded by Hiram Church Ford
