= Jennifer B. Coffman =

American judge (born 1948)

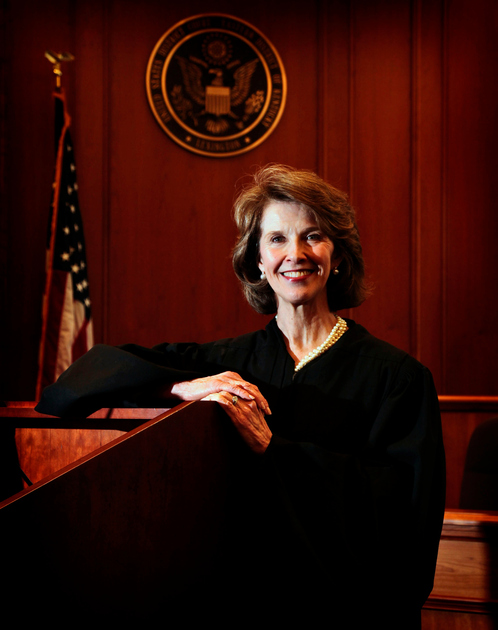
- Coffman in 2012

Judge of the United States Foreign Intelligence Surveillance Court
- In office May 19, 2011 – January 8, 2013
- Appointed by: John Roberts
- Preceded by: Frederick Scullin
- Succeeded by: Claire Eagan

Chief Judge of the United States District Court for the Eastern District of Kentucky
- In office 2007–2012
- Preceded by: Joseph Martin Hood
- Succeeded by: Karen K. Caldwell

Judge of the United States District Court for the Eastern District of Kentucky Judge of the United States District Court for the Western District of Kentucky
- In office October 1, 1993 – January 8, 2013
- Appointed by: Bill Clinton
- Preceded by: Eugene E. Siler Jr.
- Succeeded by: Claria Horn Boom

Personal details
- Born: Jennifer Lynne Burcham; January 8, 1948 (age 78) Union City, Tennessee, U.S.
- Education: University of Kentucky (BA, MS); University of Kentucky College of Law (JD)

Jennifer Lynne Burcham Coffman (born January 8, 1948) is a former United States district judge of the United States District Court for the Eastern District of Kentucky and the United States District Court for the Western District of Kentucky.

== Education and career ==
Born in Union City, Tennessee, Coffman received a Bachelor of Arts degree from the University of Kentucky in 1969, a Master of Science from the same institution in 1971, and a Juris Doctor from the University of Kentucky College of Law in 1978. She was in private practice in Lexington, Kentucky from 1977 to 1993, also teaching as an adjunct instructor at the University of Kentucky College of Law from 1979 to 1981.

== Federal judicial service ==
On August 6, 1993, Coffman was nominated by President Bill Clinton to a joint appointment to both the United States District Court for the Eastern District of Kentucky and the United States District Court for the Western District of Kentucky, both seats having been vacated by Eugene E. Siler Jr., who had been elevated to the United States Court of Appeals for the Sixth Circuit on September 20, 1991. She was confirmed by the United States Senate on September 30, 1993, and received her commission on October 1, 1993. She served as the Chief Judge of the Eastern District from 2007 to 2012. She also served a seven-year term on the United States Foreign Intelligence Surveillance Court starting in 2011 until she retired from all of her appointments, effective January 8, 2013. She was the first female judge appointed to the federal courts in Kentucky, and as of 2020 Coffman is the last judge appointed by a Democratic president to the Eastern District of Kentucky.

=== Response to Judge Philpot ===
In 2013, following the gay rights decisions in Hollingsworth v. Perry and United States v. Windsor, Kentucky circuit court Judge Tim Philpot wrote an opinion editorial titled "Rulings do not change Ky. law on gay marriage." Coffman wrote an opinion editorial in response, highly critical of Philpot's judgement in writing the piece and declaring that he had risked his judicial integrity and concluded that "Philpot might have foreclosed his ability to sit on any case involving gay marriage because his comments raise a question of bias on the topic of sexual orientation." Coffman also criticized Philpot for dismissing principles of judicial interpretation as "boring and technical", for gratuitously mentioning Walker's sexuality, and for ridiculing judicial review with his observation that then-Chief Judge of the United States District Court for the Northern District of California Vaughn Walker's declaration that Proposition 8 was unconstitutional amounted to "one trial judge trump[ing] every voter in California."

== See also ==
- List of first women lawyers and judges in Kentucky

== Notes ==
Legal offices
Preceded by Eugene E. Siler Jr.	Judge of the United States District Court for the Eastern District of Kentucky; Judge of the United States District Court for the Western District of Kentucky; 1993–2013	Succeeded by Claria Horn Boom
Preceded by Joseph Martin Hood	Chief Judge of the United States District Court for the Eastern District of Kentucky; 2007–2012	Succeeded by Karen K. Caldwell
Preceded by Frederick Scullin	Judge of the United States Foreign Intelligence Surveillance Court; 2011–2013	Succeeded by Claire Eagan
