= Mac Swinford =

American judge

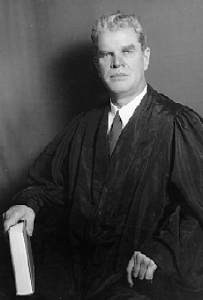
- Official portrait, c. 1950

Chief Judge of the United States District Court for the Eastern District of Kentucky
- In office 1963–1969
- Preceded by: Hiram Church Ford
- Succeeded by: Bernard Thomas Moynahan Jr.

Judge of the United States District Court for the Eastern District of Kentucky Judge of the United States District Court for the Western District of Kentucky
- In office August 21, 1937 – February 3, 1975
- Appointed by: Franklin D. Roosevelt
- Preceded by: Seat established by 49 Stat. 1806
- Succeeded by: Eugene Edward Siler Jr.

United States Attorney for the United States District Court for the Eastern District of Kentucky
- In office 1933–1937
- Preceded by: Sawyer A. Smith
- Succeeded by: John T. Metcalf

Member of the Kentucky House of Representatives from the 71st district
- In office January 1, 1926 – January 1, 1930
- Preceded by: Hugh C. Duffy
- Succeeded by: Frank Lebus

Personal details
- Born: Mac Swinford; December 23, 1899 Cynthiana, Kentucky, U.S.
- Died: February 3, 1975 (aged 75)
- Party: Democratic
- Education: University of Virginia; University of Virginia School of Law

Mac Swinford (December 23, 1899 – February 3, 1975) was a United States district judge of the United States District Court for the Eastern District of Kentucky and the United States District Court for the Western District of Kentucky.

== Education and career ==
Born in Cynthiana, Kentucky, Swinford attended the University of Virginia and read law in 1922, then graduated from the University of Virginia School of Law in 1925. He was in private practice in Cynthiana from 1922 to 1933. He was a member of the Kentucky House of Representatives from 1926 to 1929, and was then the United States Attorney for the Eastern District of Kentucky from 1933 to 1937.

== Federal judicial service ==
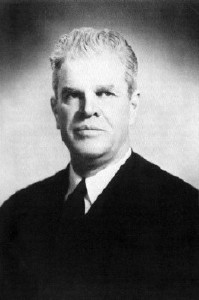
Judicial portrait of Swinford, 1976, by William P. Walsh.

Swinford was nominated by President Franklin D. Roosevelt on August 19, 1937, to the United States District Court for the Eastern District of Kentucky and the United States District Court for the Western District of Kentucky, to a new joint seat authorized by 49 Stat. 1806. He was confirmed by the United States Senate on August 20, 1937, and received his commission on August 21, 1937. He served as Chief Judge of the Eastern District from 1963 to 1969. He was a member of the Judicial Conference of the United States from 1966 to 1969. His service terminated on February 3, 1975, due to his death.

== See also ==
- List of United States federal judges by longevity of service

== Sources ==
Legal offices
| Preceded by Seat established by 49 Stat. 1806 | Judge of the United States District Court for the Eastern District of Kentucky; Judge of the United States District Court for the Western District of Kentucky; 1937–1975 | Succeeded by Eugene Edward Siler Jr. |
| Preceded by Hiram Church Ford | Chief Judge of the United States District Court for the Eastern District of Kentucky; 1963–1969 | Succeeded by Bernard Thomas Moynahan Jr. |
