= Claria Horn Boom =

American judge (born 1969)

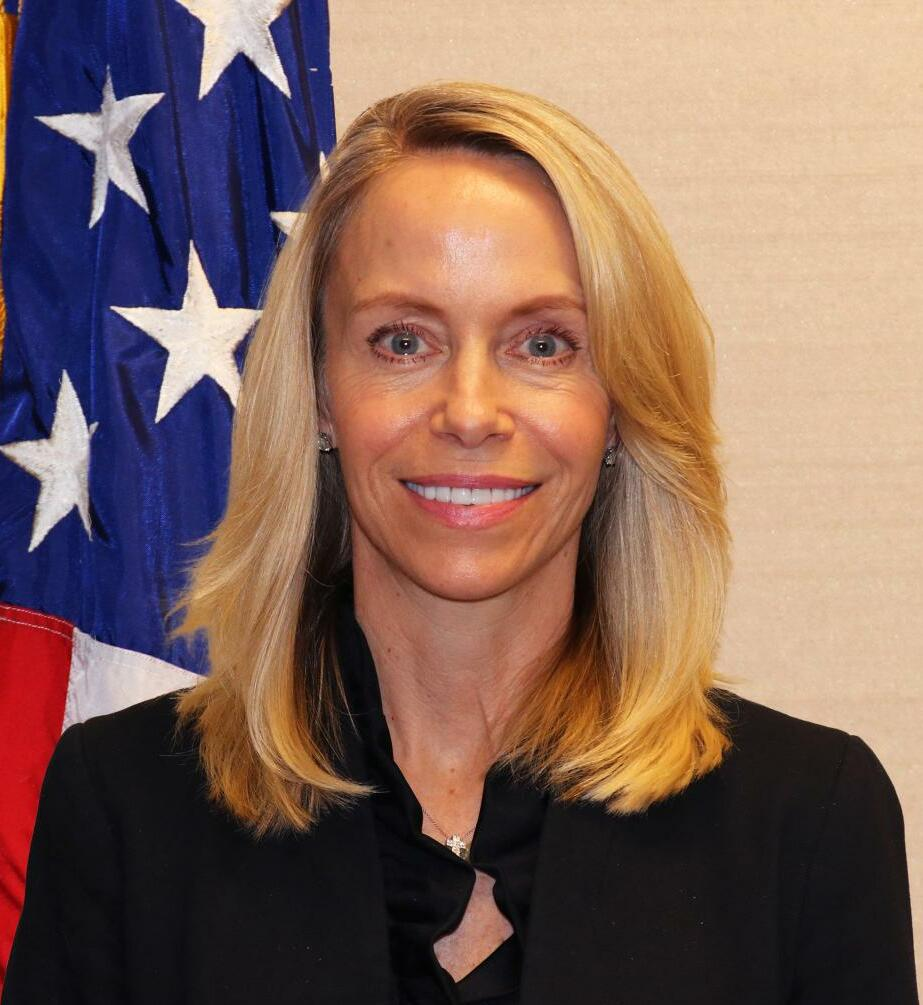
- Boom in 2022

Member of the United States Sentencing Commission
- In office August 5, 2022 – December 2024
- Appointed by: Joe Biden
- Preceded by: William H. Pryor Jr.
- Succeeded by: vacant

Judge of the United States District Court for the Eastern District of Kentucky Judge of the United States District Court for the Western District of Kentucky
- Incumbent
- Assumed office April 11, 2018
- Appointed by: Donald Trump
- Preceded by: Jennifer B. Coffman

Personal details
- Born: Claria Denise Horn; 1969 (age 56–57) Ashland, Kentucky, U.S.
- Spouse: Denny Boom (m. 2013)
- Education: Transylvania University (BA); Vanderbilt University (JD)

Claria Denise Horn Boom (née Horn; born 1969) is a United States district judge of the United States District Court for the Eastern District of Kentucky and United States District Court for the Western District of Kentucky. She is a member of the United States Sentencing Commission.

== Education and career ==
Boom earned her Bachelor of Arts degree from Transylvania University and her Juris Doctor from the Vanderbilt University Law School. She clerked for Judge Pierce Lively of the United States Court of Appeals for the Sixth Circuit. Early in her career she was an Assistant United States Attorney in the Eastern and Western Districts of Kentucky, and before that, practiced at King & Spalding in Atlanta, Georgia. Before becoming a judge, she practiced as a partner at Frost Brown Todd in the Lexington office.

== Federal judicial service ==
On June 7, 2017, President Donald Trump announced his intent to nominate Boom to serve as a United States District Judge of the United States District Court for the Eastern District of Kentucky and of the United States District Court for the Western District of Kentucky, to the joint seat vacated by Judge Jennifer B. Coffman, who retired on January 8, 2013. On June 12, 2017, her nomination was sent to the Senate. Boom received a "qualified" rating from the American Bar Association. A hearing on her nomination before the Senate Judiciary Committee took place on November 15, 2017. On December 7, 2017, her nomination was reported out of committee by voice vote. On April 9, 2018, the United States Senate invoked cloture on her nomination by a 96–2 vote. On April 10, 2018, her nomination was confirmed by a 96–1 vote. She received her commission on April 11, 2018. She maintains chambers in London, Kentucky for the Eastern District and Louisville, Kentucky for the Western District.

== United States Sentencing Commission ==
=== Intent to nominate under Trump ===
On August 12, 2020, President Donald Trump announced his intent to nominate Boom to serve as a Commissioner of the United States Sentencing Commission.

=== Nomination under Biden ===
On May 11, 2022, President Joe Biden announced his intent to nominate Boom to serve as a member of the United States Sentencing Commission. On May 12, 2022, her nomination was sent to the Senate, she has been nominated to fill the position left vacant by Judge William H. Pryor Jr., whose term expired. On June 8, 2022, a hearing on her nomination was held before the Senate Judiciary Committee. On July 21, 2022, her nomination was reported out of committee by a voice vote. On August 4, 2022, the United States Senate confirmed her nomination by a voice vote. On October 18, 2023, she was renominated by President Biden for an additional term. On October 24, 2023, her renomination was sent to the Senate. On April 18, 2024, her nomination was favorably reported out of committee by a 21–0 vote. Her nomination is pending before the United States Senate.

== Personal life ==
Boom grew up in Martin County, Kentucky, where her mother served as clerk of the court. In 2013, she married Denny Boom, who is the president of a Lexington construction company.

Legal offices
Preceded by Jennifer B. Coffman	Judge of the United States District Court for the Eastern District of Kentucky; Judge of the United States District Court for the Western District of Kentucky; 2018–present	Incumbent
