= William Bertelsman =

American judge (born 1936)

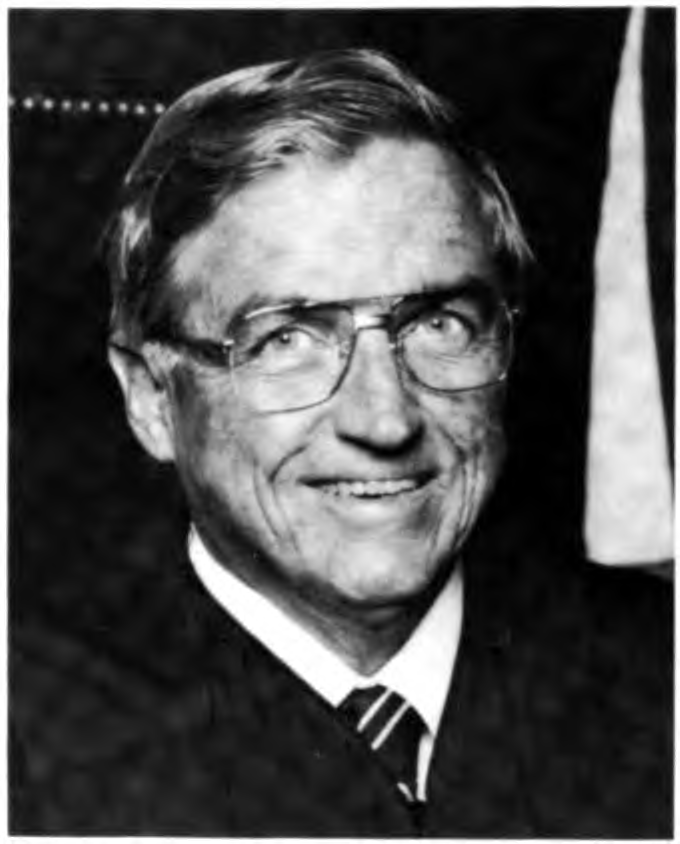
- Bertelsman, c. 1990

Senior Judge of the United States District Court for the Eastern District of Kentucky
- Incumbent
- Assumed office February 1, 2001

Chief Judge of the United States District Court for the Eastern District of Kentucky
- In office 1991–1998
- Preceded by: Eugene Edward Siler Jr.
- Succeeded by: Henry Rupert Wilhoit Jr.

Judge of the United States District Court for the Eastern District of Kentucky
- In office November 27, 1979 – February 1, 2001
- Appointed by: Jimmy Carter
- Preceded by: Seat established by 92 Stat. 1629
- Succeeded by: David Bunning

Personal details
- Born: January 31, 1936 (age 90) Cincinnati, Ohio, U.S.
- Education: Xavier University (AB); University of Cincinnati (JD)

William Odis Bertelsman (born January 31, 1936) is a former United States district judge of the United States District Court for the Eastern District of Kentucky.

== Education and career ==
Born in Cincinnati, Ohio, Bertelsman received an Artium Baccalaureus degree from Xavier University of Ohio in 1958, and a Juris Doctor from the University of Cincinnati College of Law in 1961. He was in private practice in Newport, Kentucky from 1962 to 1979, also serving as a captain in the United States Army from 1963 to 1964. He was a lecturer for the University of Cincinnati College of Law from 1965 to 1972, and an adjunct professor of law at the Salmon P. Chase College of Law at Northern Kentucky University beginning in 1989.

== Federal judicial service ==
On October 11, 1979, Bertelsman was nominated by President Jimmy Carter to a new seat on the United States District Court for the Eastern District of Kentucky created by 92 Stat. 1629. He was confirmed by the United States Senate on November 26, 1979, and received his commission the next day. He served as Chief Judge from 1991 to 1998, assuming senior status on February 1, 2001.

== Notable cases ==
In 2013, Bertelsman provided the opinion for the case Jones v. Dirty World Entertainment Recordings LLC.

In 2019, Bertelsman was the assigned judge in the Sandmann v. Washington Post lawsuit. In this case, Covington Catholic High School student Nick Sandmann sued the Washington Post for defamation, after they reported on a confrontation between Sandmann and his classmates and Nathan Phillips, a Native American elder. Bertelsman dismissed the case, stating:

The Court accepts Sandmann’s statement that, when he was standing motionless in the confrontation with Phillips, his intent was to calm the situation and not to impede or block anyone. However, Phillips did not see it that way. He concluded that he was being ‘blocked’ and not allowed to ‘retreat.’ He passed these conclusions on to The Post. They may have been erroneous, but as discussed above, they are opinion protected by the First Amendment. And The Post is not liable for publishing these opinions.

In 2020, in the case Roberts v Neace, Bertelsman enjoined the state from enforcing a ban on interstate travel during the COVID-19 pandemic, and rejected the travel ban on constitutional grounds.

== See also ==
- List of United States federal judges by longevity of service

== Sources ==
Legal offices
Preceded by Seat established by 92 Stat. 1629	Judge of the United States District Court for the Eastern District of Kentucky; 1979–2001	Succeeded by David Bunning
Preceded by Eugene Edward Siler Jr.	Chief Judge of the United States District Court for the Eastern District of Kentucky; 1991–1998	Succeeded by Henry Rupert Wilhoit Jr.
