= Sentencing Act of 1987 =

The Sentencing Act of 1987 (Pub.L. 100-182) enacted some changes to the federal sentencing regime in the United States. The legislation amended 18 U.S.C. § 3553(b) to permit expressly departures based on circumstances of an exceptional "kind" or "degree". The insertion of this new language was described by the manager of the House bill, Representative John Conyers, as "clarifying" in nature because it simply made explicit in the law that which was previously described in the Senate Committee Report as implicit and intended. There is evidence that under the new regime, sentences may not have increased as much as expected: although the average prison term for trial sentences increases post‐reforms, there is no systematic increase in the average length of the pleas.

Additionally, the law abolished parole for federal prisoners and created the United States Sentencing Commission. The commission makes the guidelines used by federal judges when sentencing people convicted of a federal crime.

The bill was introduced by Senator Joseph Biden on October 27, 1987. It was signed into law on December 7, 1987, by President Ronald Reagan.
