= Karen K. Caldwell =

American judge (born 1956)

Karen Kaye Caldwell
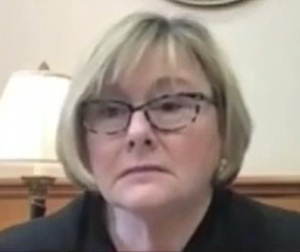
- Caldwell in 2020

Chief Judge of the United States District Court for the Eastern District of Kentucky
- In office October 15, 2012 – August 2019
- Preceded by: Jennifer B. Coffman
- Succeeded by: Danny C. Reeves

Judge of the United States District Court for the Eastern District of Kentucky
- Incumbent
- Assumed office October 24, 2001
- Appointed by: George W. Bush
- Preceded by: Henry Rupert Wilhoit Jr.

Personal details
- Born: Karen Kaye Caldwell; 1956 (age 69–70) Stanford, Kentucky, U.S.
- Education: Transylvania University (BA); University of Kentucky (JD)

Karen Kaye Caldwell (born 1956) is a United States district judge of the United States District Court for the Eastern District of Kentucky.

== Education and prior career ==
Caldwell earned her Bachelor of Arts degree in 1977 from Transylvania University, and her Juris Doctor from University of Kentucky College of Law in 1980. She worked as a field claims representative for State Farm Insurance from 1980 until 1987, and also worked as an adjunct professor at Eastern Kentucky University during the years of 1984, 1985, and 1987. She then served as an Assistant United States Attorney for the Eastern District of Kentucky, from 1987 to 1990. She was appointed United States Attorney for the Eastern District of Kentucky in 1991, by President George H. W. Bush, and served in that capacity until 1993, when she entered private practice. One of the firms Caldwell worked for was Dinsmore & Shohl, where she was made partner at their Louisville office. Caldwell also temporarily returned to teaching, serving as an adjunct professor at her alma mater, Transylvania University, during the 2000 school year.

A Courier Journal report on Caldwell's appointment as U.S. attorney in 1991 noted that she had dated senator Mitch McConnell. McConnell, who recommended Caldwell for that position, said at the time that she was well qualified and should not be barred from the position because of their personal relationship.

== Federal judicial service ==
Caldwell was nominated by President George W. Bush on September 4, 2001, to a seat vacated by Henry Rupert Wilhoit Jr. She was confirmed by the Senate on October 23, 2001, and received her commission on October 24, 2001. She served as Chief Judge from October 15, 2012, until August 2019.

In 2007, she was honored by the University of Kentucky College of Law and the Kentucky Bar Association by being inducted into the college's Hall of Fame.

Legal offices
Preceded by Henry Rupert Wilhoit Jr.	Judge of the United States District Court for the Eastern District of Kentucky; 2001–present	Incumbent
Preceded by Jennifer B. Coffman	Chief Judge of the United States District Court for the Eastern District of Kentucky; 2012–2019	Succeeded by Danny C. Reeves
