= Joseph Martin Hood =

American judge (born 1942)

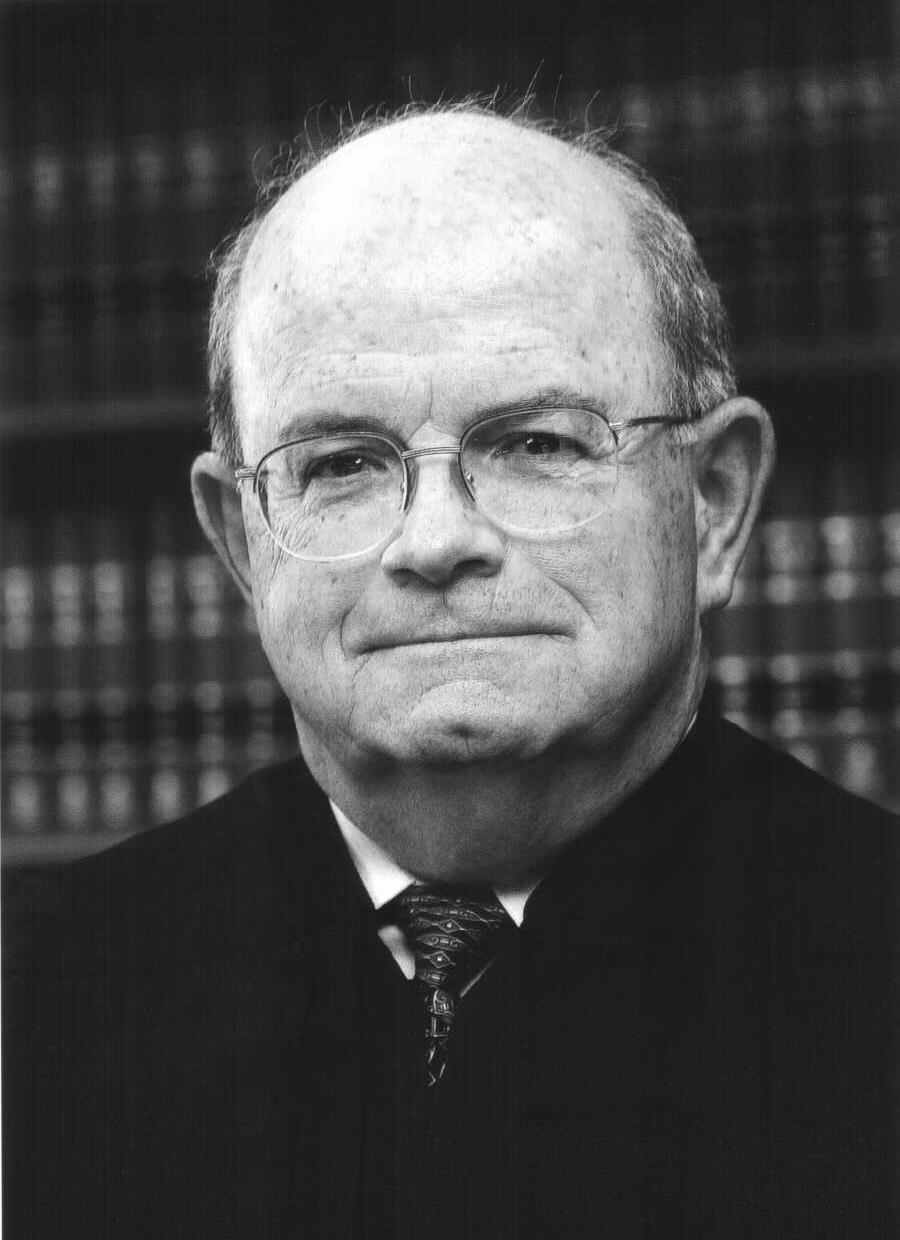
- Hood, c. 2006

Senior Judge of the United States District Court for the Eastern District of Kentucky
- Incumbent
- Assumed office October 14, 2007

Chief Judge of the United States District Court for the Eastern District of Kentucky
- In office 2005–2007
- Preceded by: Karl Spillman Forester
- Succeeded by: Jennifer B. Coffman

Judge of the United States District Court for the Eastern District of Kentucky
- In office April 30, 1990 – October 14, 2007
- Appointed by: George H. W. Bush
- Preceded by: Scott Elgin Reed
- Succeeded by: Amul Thapar

Magistrate Judge of the United States District Court for the Eastern District of Kentucky
- In office 1976–1990

Personal details
- Born: Joseph Martin Hood; 1942 (age 83–84) Ashland, Kentucky, U.S.
- Education: University of Kentucky (BS, JD)

Joseph Martin Hood (born 1942) is a senior United States district judge of the United States District Court for the Eastern District of Kentucky.

== Education and career ==
Born in Ashland, Kentucky, Hood received a Bachelor of Science degree from the University of Kentucky in 1965 and a Juris Doctor from the University of Kentucky College of Law in 1972. He was in the United States Army as a Captain from 1966 to 1970. He was a law clerk to Judge Howard David Hermansdorfer of the United States District Court for the Eastern District of Kentucky from 1972 to 1976, and was then a United States magistrate judge for the same court from 1976 to 1990.

== Federal judicial service ==
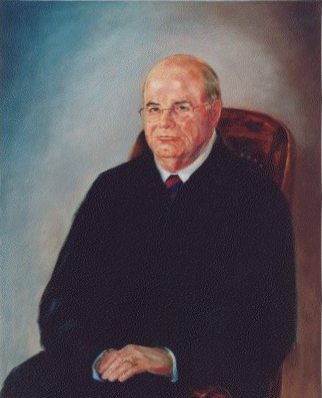
Judicial portrait of Hood, 2007, by Marcia Cone.

On January 24, 1990, Hood was nominated by President George H. W. Bush to a seat on the United States District Court for the Eastern District of Kentucky vacated by Judge Scott Elgin Reed. Hood was confirmed by the United States Senate on April 27, 1990, and received his commission on April 30, 1990. He served as Chief Judge from 2005 to 2007, assuming senior status on October 14, 2007. He has been a member of the Judicial Conference of the United States since 2016.

== Sources ==
Legal offices
Preceded by Scott Elgin Reed	Judge of the United States District Court for the Eastern District of Kentucky; 1990–2007	Succeeded by Amul Thapar
Preceded by Karl Spillman Forester	Chief Judge of the United States District Court for the Eastern District of Kentucky; 2005–2007	Succeeded by Jennifer B. Coffman
