= Hiram Church Ford =

American judge

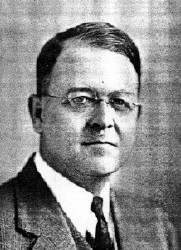

Senior Judge of the United States District Court for the Eastern District of Kentucky
- In office January 1, 1963 – June 8, 1969

Chief Judge of the United States District Court for the Eastern District of Kentucky
- In office 1948–1963
- Preceded by: Office established
- Succeeded by: Mac Swinford

Judge of the United States District Court for the Eastern District of Kentucky
- In office March 28, 1935 – January 1, 1963
- Appointed by: Franklin D. Roosevelt
- Preceded by: Andrew M. J. Cochran
- Succeeded by: Bernard Thomas Moynahan Jr.

Personal details
- Born: Hiram Church Ford; July 28, 1884 Scott County, Kentucky, U.S.
- Died: June 8, 1969 (aged 84) Georgetown, Kentucky, U.S.
- Education: Georgetown College (A.B.); Transylvania University (LL.B.)

Hiram Church Ford (July 28, 1884 – June 8, 1969) was a United States district judge of the United States District Court for the Eastern District of Kentucky.

== Education and career ==
Born in Scott County, Kentucky, Ford received an Artium Baccalaureus degree from Georgetown College (Note: Georgetown College is in Georgetown, Kentucky and is not to be confused with Georgetown University in Washington, D.C.) in 1905 and a Bachelor of Laws from the law department of Kentucky University (now Transylvania University) in 1907. He was generally in private practice in Georgetown, Kentucky from 1907 to 1931, also serving as a county attorney for Scott County from 1910 to 1926. He was a Circuit Judge for the 14th Judicial District of Kentucky from 1931 to 1935.

== Federal judicial service ==
On March 19, 1935, Ford was nominated by President Franklin D. Roosevelt to a seat on the United States District Court for the Eastern District of Kentucky vacated by Judge Andrew McConnell January Cochran. Ford was confirmed by the United States Senate on March 27, 1935, and received his commission on March 28, 1935. He served as Chief Judge from 1948 to 1963, assuming senior status on January 1, 1963, and serving in that capacity until his death on June 8, 1969, in Georgetown.

== Sources ==
Legal offices
Preceded by Andrew McConnell January Cochran	Judge of the United States District Court for the Eastern District of Kentucky; 1935–1963	Succeeded by Bernard Thomas Moynahan Jr.
Preceded by Office established	Chief Judge of the United States District Court for the Eastern District of Kentucky; 1948–1963	Succeeded by Mac Swinford
