= Bernard T. Moynahan Jr. =

American judge

Bernard Thomas Moynahan Jr.
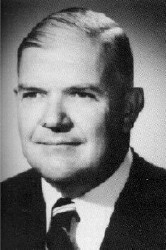

Senior Judge of the United States District Court for the Eastern District of Kentucky
- In office September 30, 1984 – September 30, 1999

Chief Judge of the United States District Court for the Eastern District of Kentucky
- In office 1969–1984
- Preceded by: Mac Swinford
- Succeeded by: Eugene Edward Siler Jr.

Judge of the United States District Court for the Eastern District of Kentucky
- In office November 8, 1963 – September 30, 1984
- Appointed by: John F. Kennedy
- Preceded by: Hiram Church Ford
- Succeeded by: Seat abolished

Personal details
- Born: Bernard Thomas Moynahan Jr. December 29, 1918 Akron, Ohio, U.S.
- Died: September 30, 1999 (aged 80) Lexington, Kentucky, U.S.
- Education: University of Kentucky (A.B.); University of Kentucky College of Law (LL.B.)

Bernard Thomas Moynahan Jr. (December 29, 1918 – September 30, 1999) was a United States district judge of the United States District Court for the Eastern District of Kentucky.

== Education and career ==
Born in Akron, Ohio, Moynahan received an Artium Baccalaureus degree from the University of Kentucky in 1935, and a Bachelor of Laws from the University of Kentucky College of Law in 1938.

Moynahan was a prodigy, he graduated "High School at age 13" then graduated from the "University of Kentucky's College of Arts and Sciences at age 16." Moynahan graduated from the University of Kentucky "College of Law at 19 - all with honors." At the time of his graduation from law school, Kentucky required lawyers taking the bar to be 21 years old. "Because of his youth, he had to get special permission from the Kentucky State Bar Association before he could take the bar exam." See, Loneliness, torment part of the job, judge learns, The Lexington Leader, January 22, 1981. Moynahan had a distinguished military experience. He "served in the Army Air Force in Europe during World War II ....as a navigator on a B-17 bomber." Moynahan's plane "was shot down over Germany" and he "spent 14 months as a prisoner of war." He returned home "in June 1945 to Jessamine County [KY] where his family has owned farmland since before the Civil War."

After serving as "county attorney ...for seven years, Moynahan" was appointed the "United States attorney in 1961-62." He later was appointed "as a U.S. District Court judge for the Eastern District of Kentucky." Moynahan "was sworn in November 22, 1963, two hours before the assassination of the man who appointed him - President John Kennedy."

He was in private practice in Lexington, Kentucky from 1938 to 1939, and in Nicholasville, Kentucky from 1940 to 1942. He served in the United States Army Air Corps as a First Lieutenant during World War II, from 1942 to 1945. He was county attorney of Jessamine County, Kentucky from 1946 to 1954, returning to private practice in Nicholasville from 1954 to 1961. He was the United States Attorney for the Eastern District of Kentucky from 1961 to 1963.

== Federal judicial service ==
On September 16, 1963, Moynahan was nominated by President John F. Kennedy to a seat on the United States District Court for the Eastern District of Kentucky vacated by Judge Hiram Church Ford. Moynahan was confirmed by the United States Senate on November 4, 1963, and received his commission on November 8, 1963. He served as Chief Judge from 1969 to 1984, assuming senior status on September 30, 1984. Moynahan served in that capacity until his death on September 30, 1999, in Lexington.

While service as a federal district Judge, Moynahan was instrumental in urging Congress to increase the number of federal judges in rural districts. In a 1983 interview, Judge Moynahan remarked about the increase in cases filed in federal district courts. ""The courts are being called on to judge all forms of human behavior, to run schools and cities, decide on job promotions or if a student's hair is too long.. 20 years ago when I went on the bench most of the cases we have today wouldn't be here," Moynahan added this example. "Consider a coal miner, old, broken down from years of hard work. He files a state claim for workman's compensation, a black lung case and social security claim in federal court. That's one man with three cases going, one in state court and two in federal" court. In that same Portrait, the Judge said that "He regards voting as a privilege and obligation." ""I've voted in every election, save one . . . I missed that when I was a prisoner of war."

== Sources ==
Legal offices
| Preceded by Hiram Church Ford | Judge of the United States District Court for the Eastern District of Kentucky; 1963–1984 | Succeeded by Seat abolished |
| Preceded by Mac Swinford | Chief Judge of the United States District Court for the Eastern District of Kentucky; 1969–1984 | Succeeded by Eugene Edward Siler Jr. |
