= United States Sentencing Commission =

Independent agency of the U.S. federal judiciary which determines sentencing guidelines

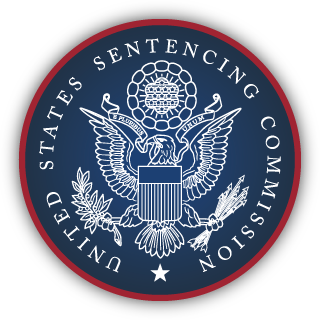
- Seal of the United States Sentencing Commission

Agency overview
- Formed: 1984
- Jurisdiction: United States Judiciary
- Headquarters: Thurgood Marshall Federal Judiciary Building Washington, D.C.
- Employees: 100
- Agency executive: Carlton W. Reeves, Chairman
- Website: ussc.gov

The United States Sentencing Commission is an independent agency of the judicial branch of the U.S. federal government. It is responsible for articulating the U.S. Federal Sentencing Guidelines for the federal courts. The Commission promulgates the Federal Sentencing Guidelines, which replaced the prior system of indeterminate sentencing that allowed trial judges to give sentences ranging from probation to the maximum statutory punishment for the offense. It is headquartered in Washington, D.C.

The commission was created by the Sentencing Reform Act provisions of the Comprehensive Crime Control Act of 1984. The constitutionality of the commission was challenged as a congressional encroachment on the power of the executive but upheld by the Supreme Court in Mistretta v. United States, 488 U.S. 361 (1989).

The U.S. Sentencing Commission was established by Congress as a permanent, independent agency within the judicial branch. The seven members of the Commission are appointed by the president and confirmed by the Senate for six-year terms. The Judicial Conference offers names of potential nominees to the president for nomination. Commission members may be reappointed to one additional term, also with the advice and consent of the Senate. Some Commission members have been appointed to finish out the term of prior members instead of starting their own 6-year term, and therefore, not all Commission members have served six years or more. Three of the members must be federal judges, and no more than four may belong to the same political party. The attorney general or his designee and the chair of the United States Parole Commission sit as ex officio, non-voting members of the Commission. The Commission requires a quorum of at least four voting members in order to promulgate amendments to the Sentencing Guidelines.

The Commission lacked full membership from 2014 to 2022. On August 4, 2022, the Senate confirmed President Biden's seven nominees to the Commission; all the confirmed members were sworn in the next day.

== Current membership ==
The commissioners as of May 25, 2026 are:

Position	Member	Party	Occupation	Date appointed	Term expiration
Chair	Carlton W. Reeves	Democratic	Judge, District Court for the Southern District of Mississippi	August 5, 2022	October 31, 2027
Vice Chair	L. Felipe Restrepo	Democratic	Judge, Court of Appeals for the Third Circuit	August 5, 2022	October 31, 2025
Vice Chair	Laura Mate	Democratic	Director of Sentencing Resource Counsel	August 5, 2022	October 31, 2027
Vice Chair	Claire McCusker Murray	Republican	Former Principal Deputy Associate Attorney General	August 5, 2022	October 31, 2025
Commissioner	Candice C. Wong	Republican	Partner, Fried, Frank, Harris, Shriver & Jacobson LLP	August 5, 2022	October 31, 2027
Commissioner	Vacant	—N/a	—	—	October 31, 2029
Commissioner	Vacant	—N/a	—	—	October 31, 2029
(Ex officio Commissioner) (non-voting)	Vacant	—N/a	Chair, United States Parole Commission	—	—
(Ex officio Commissioner) (non-voting) (Attorney General's designee)	Scott A.C. Meisler	—N/a	Deputy Chief of the Appellate Section, Criminal Division, U.S. Department of Justice	—	—

=== Nominations ===
President Trump has nominated the following to fill seats on the commission. They await Senate confirmation.

Name	Party	Term expires	Replacing
John P. Cronan	Republican	October 31, 2029	John Gleeson
Jason Manion	Republican	October 31, 2029	Claria Horn Boom
Claire McCusker Murray	Republican	October 31, 2031	Reappointment
L. Felipe Restrepo	Democratic	October 31, 2031	Reappointment

== Former membership ==
As listed on the U.S. Sentencing Commission's website:

Former Members of the U.S. Sentencing Commission
Title	Member	Occupation	Date appointed	Term expiration
Chairman	William W. Wilkins, Jr.	Judge, U.S. District Circuit, South Carolina; subsequently elevated to U.S. Court of Appeals, Fourth Circuit	1985	1994
	Stephen G. Breyer	Judge, U.S. Court of Appeals, First Circuit (later Associate Justice of the Supreme Court of the United States)	1985	1989
	George E. MacKinnon	Senior Judge, U.S. Court of Appeals, D.C. Circuit	1985	1991
	Ilene H. Nagel	Professor of Law and Sociology, Indiana University School of Law	1985	1994
	Helen G. Corrothers	Member, U.S. Parole Commission	1985	1991
	Michael K. Block	Professor of Law and Economics, University of Arizona	1985	1989
	Paul H. Robinson	Professor of Law, Rutgers Law School	1985	1988
Vice Chair 1994–1996	A. David Mazzone	Judge, U.S. District Court, D. Massachusetts	1990	1996
	Julie E. Carnes	Assistant U.S. Attorney, N.D. Georgia. Subsequently was appointed as a federal district court judge for the Northern District of Georgia and continued to serve on the Commission.)	1990	1996
Vice Chair 1994–1998	Michael S. Gelacak	Attorney, McNair Firm, Washington, D.C.	1990	1998
Chairman, 1994–1998	Richard P. Conaboy	Senior Judge, U.S. District Court, Middle District of Pennsylvania	1994	1998
	Deanell R. Tacha	Judge, U.S. Court of Appeals, Tenth Circuit	1994	1998
Vice Chair, 1995–97 (holdover status ended 10/21/98)	Michael Goldsmith	Professor of Law, Brigham Young University Law School	1994	1998
	Wayne A. Budd	Attorney, Goodwin, Procter & Hoar, Boston, MA	1994	1997
	Joe Kendall	Judge, U.S. District Court, N.D. Texas	1999	2002
	Sterling Johnson, Jr.	Judge, U.S. District Court, E.D. New York	1999	2002
Chair, 1999–2004	Diana E. Murphy	Judge, U.S. Court of Appeals, 8th Circuit	1999	2004
	Michael E. O’Neill	Assistant Professor, George Mason University School of Law	1999	2005
Vice Chair, 1999 – 2007	John R. Steer	General Counsel, U.S. Sentencing Commission	1999	2007
	Michael E. Horowitz	Attorney, Cadwalader, Wickersham & Taft, Washington, DC	2003	2008
Chair, 2009–2010; Vice Chair, 1999–2009	William K. Sessions III	Judge and later elevated to Chief Judge, U.S. District Court, District of Vermont	1999	2010
Vice Chair, 1999–2010	Ruben Castillo	Judge, U.S. District Court, Northern District of Illinois	1999	2010
	Beryl Howell	Executive Managing Director and General Counsel, Stroz Friedberg, LLC, Washington, DC; subsequently appointed to the U.S. District Court, District of Columbia and later Chief Judge.	2004	2012
Vice Chair, 2008–2012	William B. Carr, Jr.	Adjunct Professor of Law, Widener Law School, Wilmington, DE	2008	2012
Chair, 2003–2010; Vice Chair, 2011–2014	Ricardo H. Hinojosa	Judge and later Chief Judge, U.S. District Court, Southern District of Texas	2003	2014
Vice Chair, 2010–2014	Ketanji Brown Jackson	Attorney, Morrison & Foerster LLP, later appointed to Judge, U.S. District Court, District of Columbia; later appointed Associate Justice of the Supreme Court of the United States	2010	2014
	Dabney L. Friedrich	Associate Counsel, Office of Counsel to the President, Washington, DC, later appointed to Judge, U.S. District Court, District of Columbia	2006 according to USSC (February 28, 2007 according to Congress.gov)	2016
Chair, December 22, 2010-2016	Patti B. Saris	Judge and later Chief Judge, U.S. District Court, District of Massachusetts	December 22, 2010	2016
Acting Chair, January 3, 2017-2018	William H. Pryor Jr.	Judge, U.S. Circuit Court, Eleventh Circuit Court of Appeals	June 6, 2013	2018
	Rachel E. Barkow	Segal Family Professor of Regulatory Law and Policy, New York University School of Law	June 2013	2018 according to USSC (January 2019 according to NYU Law)
	Danny C. Reeves	Judge, and later Chief Judge, U.S. District Court, Eastern District of Kentucky	March 21, 2017	March 2021
	John Gleeson	Former Judge, U.S. District Court, Eastern District of New York	August 5, 2022	December 2024
	Claria Horn Boom	Judge, U.S. District Court, Western District of Kentucky and Eastern District of Kentucky	August 5, 2022	December 2024

== Succession of seats ==
Seat 1
Seat established on October 12, 1984 by 98 Stat. 1837, 2017
Wilkins	SC	
Conaboy	PA	
Murphy	MN	
Howell	DC	
Barkow	NY	
Gleeson	NY	2022–2024
vacant	–	2024–present

Seat 2
Seat established on October 12, 1984 by 98 Stat. 1837, 2017
Castillo	IL
C. Breyer	CA

Seat 3
Seat established on October 12, 1984 by 98 Stat. 1837, 2017
S. Breyer	MA	
Mazzone	MA	
Kendall	TX	
Hinojosa	TX	
Reeves	KY	
Murray	MD	2022–present

Seat 4
Seat established on October 12, 1984 by 98 Stat. 1837, 2017
Sessions III	VT	
Saris	MA	
Reeves	MS	2022–present

Seat 5
Seat established on October 12, 1984 by 98 Stat. 1837, 2017
Tacha	KS	
Friedrich	MD	2006–2017
Wong	DC	2022–present

Seat 6
Seat established on October 12, 1984 by 98 Stat. 1837, 2017
Pryor, Jr.	AL	
Boom	KY	2022–2024
vacant	–	2024–present

Seat 7
Seat established on October 12, 1984 by 98 Stat. 1837, 2017
Carnes	GA	
Johnson Jr.	NY	
Horowitz	MD	
Jackson	MD	
Restrepo	PA	2022–present

== "Drugs Minus Two Amendment" ==
On April 10, 2014, the Commission unanimously voted to approve the "Drugs Minus Two Amendment." The "Drugs Minus Two Amendment" changed the U.S. Federal Sentencing Guidelines to "reduce the applicable sentencing guideline range for most federal drug trafficking offenses." The Commission voted to make the Amendment retroactive on July 18, 2014, "thereby allowing eligible offenders serving a previously imposed term of imprisonment to file a motion under 18 U.S.C. § 3582(c)(2) for a sentence reduction."

== 2015 actions ==
After a visit to a federal prison in Oklahoma by President Barack Obama in July 2015, the Commission issued new retroactive sentencing guidelines in October which lowered sentences for many drug offenders. The sentencing panel estimated that roughly 46,000 of 100,000 drug offenders serving federal sentences would qualify for early release. 6,000 would be released in November but 1/3 of those inmates were to be turned over to ICE for deportation proceedings. The commission's change represents an overall change in prosecution of drug-related offences. In response to the change, senators, in a bipartisan effort, are attempting to reduce minimum sentences for these offenses.

== Judicial Conference of the United States Commissioner Candidate Suggestions ==
In April 2021, the Judicial Conference of the United States sent the following candidate suggestions to President Biden: Judge Luis Felipe Restrepo (to represent a Democratic seat), Judge Denise Jefferson Casper (Democratic seat), Judge Abdul Kallon (Democratic seat), Judge Carol Bagley Amon (Republican seat), Judge Federico Moreno (Republican seat), and Judge Michael Seabright (Republican seat).

== Past Presidential Commissioner Nominations ==
=== President Barack Obama Nominees ===
On April 20, 2009, President Barack Obama nominated William K. Sessions III, of Vermont, to be Chair of the Commission.

On July 23, 2009, President Barack Obama nominated Ketanji Brown Jackson to be a Commissioner.

On April 28, 2010, President Barack Obama nominated Judge Patti B. Saris as Commissioner and Chair, and nominated Dabney Langhorne Friedrich as a Commissioner (for a second term).

In April 2012, President Barack Obama nominated Senior District Judge Charles R. Breyer of the United States District Court for the Northern District of California as a Commissioner.

In April 2013, President Barack Obama nominated Rachel Elise Barkow, of New York, to be a Member of the United States Sentencing Commission; Charles R. Breyer, of California, to be a Member of the United States Sentencing Commission; and William H. Pryor Jr., of Alabama, to be a Member of the United States Sentencing Commission.

On September 9, 2015, President Barack Obama nominated Judge Richard F. Boulware and Judge Charles R. Breyer as Commissioners.

On March 15, 2016, President Barack Obama nominated Judge Danny C. Reeves as a Commissioner.

On January 17, 2017, President Barack Obama nominated Charles R. Breyer for reappointment and Danny C. Reeves as a Commissioner.

=== President Donald Trump Nominees ===
In March of 2018, President Donald Trump said he intended to nominate four candidates to the Commission: "Judge William Pryor of Alabama, Judge Luis Felipe Restrepo of Pennsylvania, Judge Henry Hudson of Virginia and Georgetown University law professor William Graham Otis."

On August 12, 2020, President Donald Trump nominated five individuals to join the Sentencing Commission: Judge K. Michael Moore, of Florida, as Chairman of the United States Sentencing Commission; Judge Claria Horn Boom, of Kentucky, as a Commissioner of the United States Sentencing Commission; Judge Henry E. Hudson, of Virginia, as a Commissioner of the United States Sentencing Commission; John G. Malcolm (Vice President for the Institute for Constitutional Government and the Director of the Meese Center for Legal & Judicial Studies at the Heritage Foundation), as a Commissioner of the United States Sentencing Commission; and Judge Luis Felipe Restrepo, of Pennsylvania, as a Commissioner of the United States Sentencing Commission.

== See also ==
- Sentencing Act of 1987
