= Claire McCusker Murray =

American attorney (born 1982)

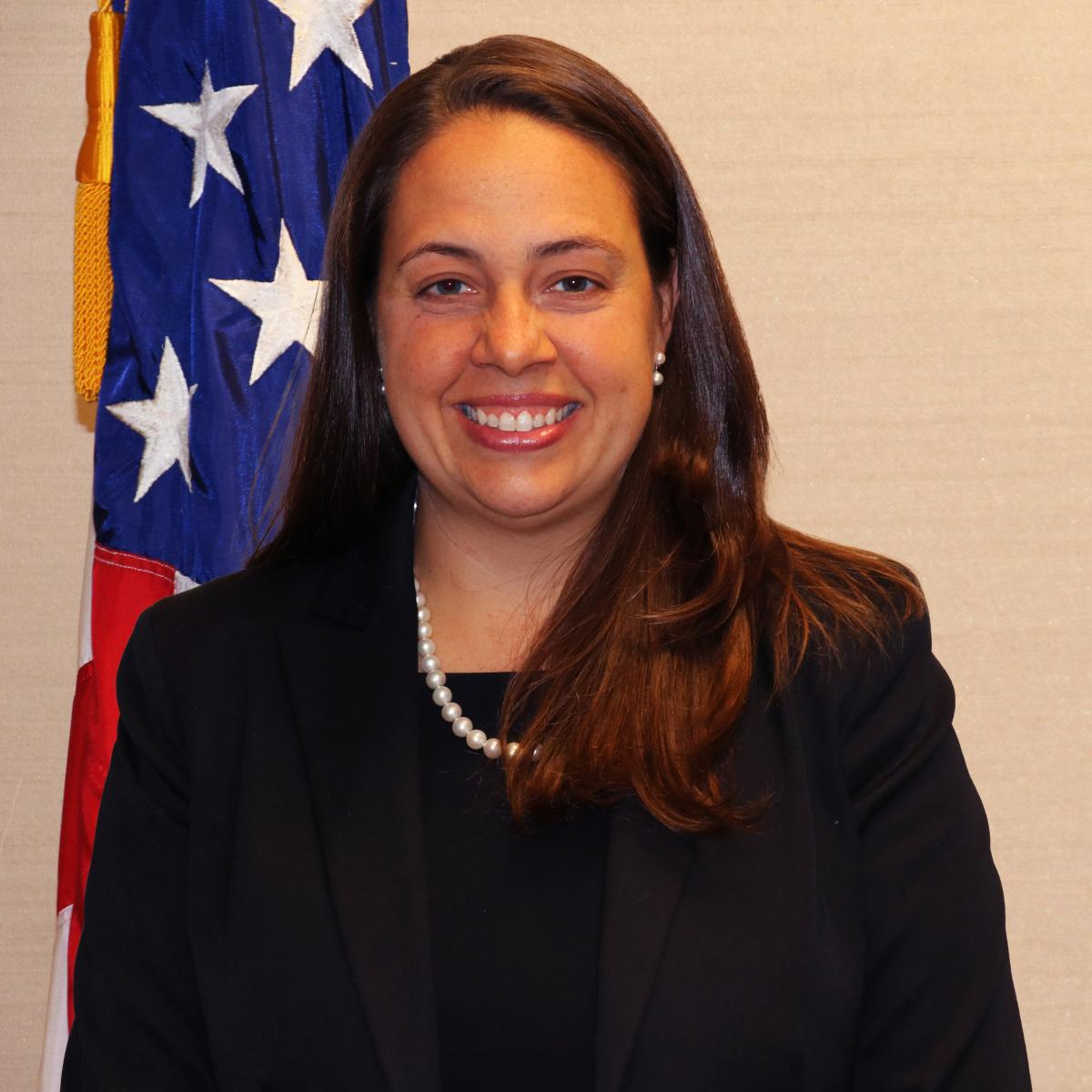

Member of the United States Sentencing Commission
- Incumbent
- Assumed office August 5, 2022
- Appointed by: Joe Biden
- Preceded by: Danny C. Reeves

United States Associate Attorney General Acting
- In office May 14, 2019 – January 20, 2021
- President: Donald Trump
- Preceded by: Jesse Panuccio (acting)
- Succeeded by: Vanita Gupta

Personal details
- Born: Claire Virginia McCusker; April 19, 1982 (age 44) New Jersey, U.S.
- Spouse: Michael Murray
- Education: Harvard University (BA); School for Advanced Studies in the Social Sciences (DEA); Trinity College, Cambridge (MPhil); Yale University (JD)

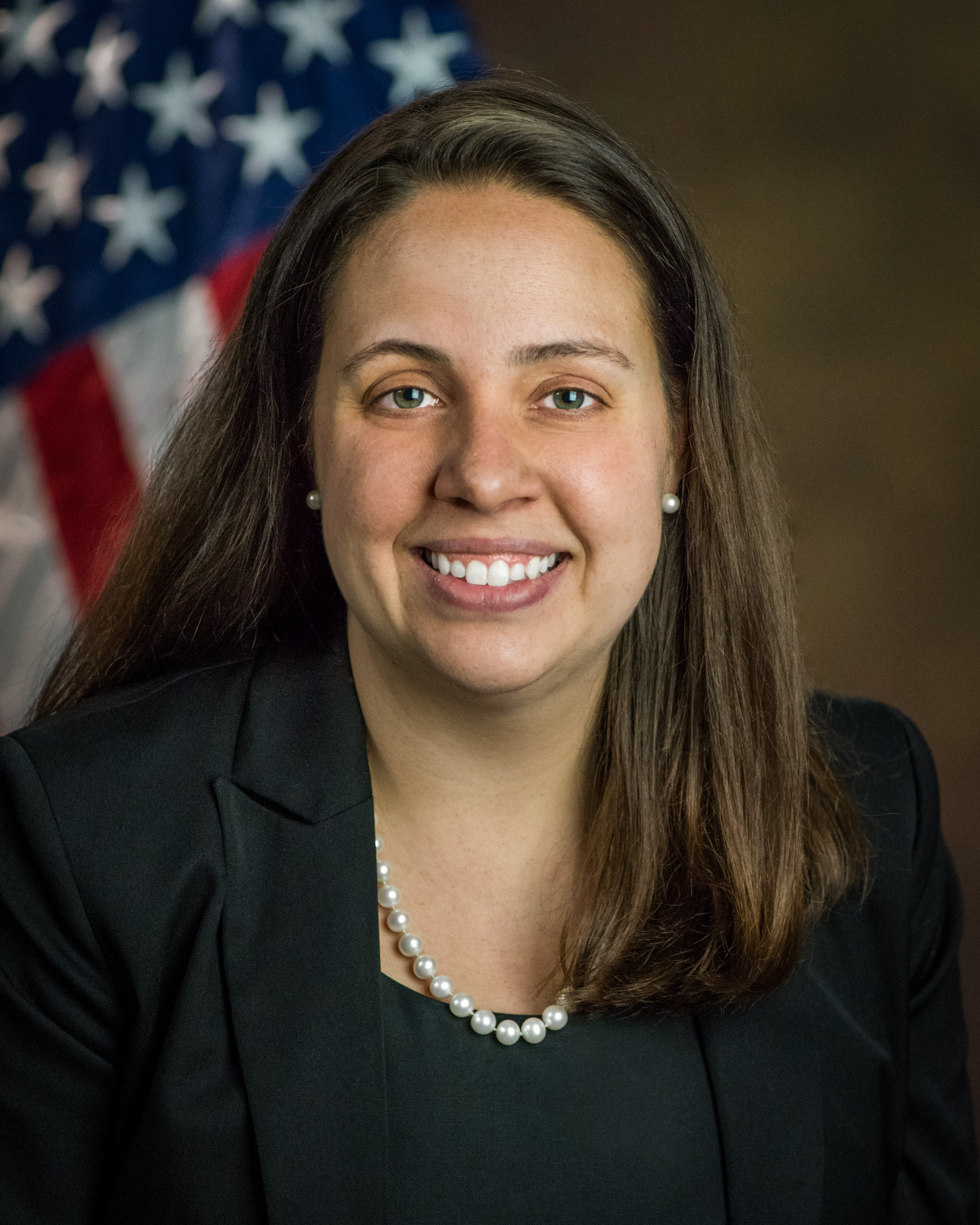
Claire McCusker Murray (2019)

Claire McCusker Murray (born April 19, 1982) is an American lawyer who served as associate White House counsel and acting associate attorney general in the United States Department of Justice during the first presidency of Donald Trump. She served in this position from May 14, 2019 until Joe Biden assumed the presidency on January 20, 2021. She is a member of the United States Sentencing Commission.

== Early life and education ==
Raised in Mountain Lakes, New Jersey, by Leo and Susan McCusker, she graduated from Mountain Lakes High School as the valedictorian and a Presidential Scholar in 2000. She was inducted into the school's hall of fame in 2016.

Murray graduated from Harvard College with a Bachelor of Arts in government magna cum laude and Phi Beta Kappa on an Augustus Clifford Tower Fellowship in 2004, then went to France for a Diploma of Advanced Studies in political studies from the School for Advanced Studies in the Social Sciences in 2005, and to the United Kingdom for a Master of Philosophy in classics from Trinity College, Cambridge, in 2006 (each with distinction). She went on to earn her Juris Doctor in 2009 from Yale Law School, where she was a member of the board of the Federalist Society, a Coker Fellow and was an articles editor of the Yale Law Journal.

After graduating law school, she served as a law clerk for then-Judge Brett Kavanaugh on the United States Court of Appeals for the District of Columbia Circuit from 2009 to 2010, then for Associate Justice Samuel Alito on the United States Supreme Court from 2012 to 2013. In 2010, between her appellate clerkship and starting at the Justice Department, she won a Temple Bar Scholarship from the American Inns of Court to examine the legal system in the United Kingdom, including the Supreme Court of the United Kingdom.

== Career ==
After returning to the United States, she worked for the U.S. Department of Justice in the Criminal Division from 2010 to 2012.

She worked as an associate (2013–2015) and then partner (2015–2017) at Kirkland & Ellis LLP.

As associate counsel for the White House, Murray played a role in the successful confirmation of Brett Kavanaugh to the Supreme Court, for whom she had clerked while he was on the circuit court. After William Barr became United States Attorney General in February 2019, she became a counselor to the attorney general and then the principal deputy associate attorney general in May 2019, in which capacity she served as acting associate attorney general pending the confirmation of a permanent associate attorney general.

== United States Sentencing Commission ==
On May 11, 2022, President Joe Biden announced his intent to nominate Murray to serve as a member of the United States Sentencing Commission. On May 12, 2022, her nomination was sent to the Senate, she has been nominated to fill the position left vacant by Judge Danny C. Reeves, whose term expired. On June 8, 2022, a hearing on her nomination was held before the Senate Judiciary Committee. On July 21, 2022, her nomination was reported out of committee by a voice vote, with Senators Sheldon Whitehouse, Richard Blumenthal, and Jon Ossoff voting “no” on record. On August 4, 2022, the United States Senate confirmed her nomination by a voice vote.

== Personal life ==
In 2010, she married Michael Murray, with whom she has five children.

== See also ==
- List of law clerks for the eighth seat of the Supreme Court of the United States

Legal offices
Preceded by William Baer	United States Associate Attorney General; Acting; 2019–2021	Succeeded by Matthew Colangelo (acting)
