= Karl Spillman Forester =

American judge

Senior Judge of the United States District Court for the Eastern District of Kentucky
- In office May 2, 2005 – March 29, 2014

Chief Judge of the United States District Court for the Eastern District of Kentucky
- In office 2001–2005
- Preceded by: Henry Rupert Wilhoit Jr.
- Succeeded by: Joseph Martin Hood

Judge of the United States District Court for the Eastern District of Kentucky
- In office July 27, 1988 – May 2, 2005
- Appointed by: Ronald Reagan
- Preceded by: Seat established by 71 Stat. 586
- Succeeded by: Gregory F. Van Tatenhove

Personal details
- Born: Karl Spillman Forester; May 2, 1940 Harlan, Kentucky
- Died: March 29, 2014 (aged 73) Lexington, Kentucky
- Education: University of Kentucky (B.A.); University of Kentucky College of Law (J.D.)

Karl Spillman Forester (May 2, 1940 – March 29, 2014) was a United States district judge of the United States District Court for the Eastern District of Kentucky.

== Education and career ==
Born in Harlan, Kentucky, Forester received a Bachelor of Arts from the University of Kentucky in 1962 and a Juris Doctor from the University of Kentucky College of Law in 1966. He was in private practice in Harlan from 1966 to 1988.

== Federal judicial service ==
Forester was nominated by President Ronald Reagan on March 30, 1988, to the United States District Court for the Eastern District of Kentucky, to a new seat authorized by 71 Stat. 586 following the certification of Green Wix Unthank as disabled. He was confirmed by the United States Senate on July 26, 1988, and received commission on July 27, 1988. He served as Chief Judge from 2001 to 2005. He assumed senior status on May 2, 2005. His service terminated on March 29, 2014, due to death.

== Death ==
Forester died on March 29, 2014, in Lexington, Kentucky at the age of 73.

== Sources ==
- Judge Forester's Homepage
- "Kentucky.com" Federal judge rules in favor of plane crash widow, October 13, 2009
- "Kentucky.com" Federal judge wants to limit pretrial publicity, July 9, 2009
- "Lexington Herald-Leader" Bribery charges dismissed in bid-rigging case, January 27, 2010
- "Judge Forester Financial Disclosures"
- "Karl Forester Political Contributions"

Legal offices
Preceded by Seat established by 71 Stat. 586	Judge of the United States District Court for the Eastern District of Kentucky; 1988–2005	Succeeded by Gregory F. Van Tatenhove
Preceded by Henry Rupert Wilhoit Jr.	Chief Judge of the United States District Court for the Eastern District of Kentucky; 2001–2005	Succeeded by Joseph Martin Hood
