= David Bunning =

American judge (born 1966)

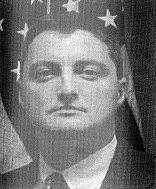

Chief Judge of the United States District Court for the Eastern District of Kentucky
- Incumbent
- Assumed office February 1, 2025
- Preceded by: Danny C. Reeves

Judge of the United States District Court for the Eastern District of Kentucky
- Incumbent
- Assumed office February 19, 2002
- Appointed by: George W. Bush
- Preceded by: William Bertelsman

Personal details
- Born: 1966 (age 59–60) Fort Thomas, Kentucky, U.S.
- Parent: Jim Bunning (father)
- Education: University of Kentucky (BA, JD)

David Louis Bunning (born 1966) is the chief United States district judge of the United States District Court for the Eastern District of Kentucky. Bunning is the son of former Republican Senator Jim Bunning, a Hall of Fame baseball pitcher who represented Kentucky in the United States Senate from 1999 to 2011.

== Life and career ==
Bunning was born in Fort Thomas, Kentucky, the son of Mary Catherine (Theis) and Jim Bunning. He received a Bachelor of Arts degree from the University of Kentucky in 1988 and a Juris Doctor from the University of Kentucky College of Law in 1991. He was a law clerk in the United States Attorney's Office, Eastern District of Kentucky in 1991, and was an Assistant United States Attorney in that office from 1991 to 2002.

=== Federal judicial service ===
Bunning was nominated by President George W. Bush on September 4, 2001, to a seat on the United States District Court for the Eastern District of Kentucky, which was vacated by William Bertelsman. On December 10, 2001, representatives of the American Bar Association's Standing Committee on Federal Judiciary testified before the United States Senate Committee of the Judiciary for the ABA's majority opinion that Bunning was unqualified for the position of a Federal District Court Judge due to his age of 35, a lack of complex civil case experience as a federal attorney, and his "middle-of-the-class law school" experience at the University of Kentucky. He was confirmed by the United States Senate with a unanimous vote on February 14, 2002, and received his commission on February 19, 2002. He became chief judge on February 1, 2025.

Vice President JD Vance clerked for Bunning.

== Notable cases ==
On September 3, 2015, Bunning issued a contempt of court ruling against Rowan County clerk Kim Davis and had her jailed for refusing to issue marriage licenses to same-sex couples. Bunning said in his ruling, "Our form of government will not survive unless we, as a society, agree to respect the U.S. Supreme Court's decisions, regardless of our personal opinions. Davis is certainly free to disagree with the Court's opinion, as many Americans likely do, but that does not excuse her from complying with it. To hold otherwise would set a dangerous precedent."

Legal offices
Preceded by William Bertelsman	Judge of the United States District Court for the Eastern District of Kentucky; 2002–present	Incumbent
Preceded by Danny C. Reeves	Chief Judge of the United States District Court for the Eastern District of Kentucky; 2025–present	Incumbent
