= John M. Rogers =

American judge (born 1948)

John Rogers
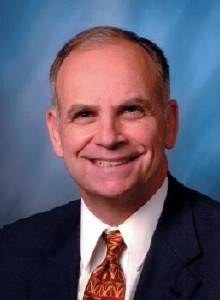

Senior Judge of the United States Court of Appeals for the Sixth Circuit
- Incumbent
- Assumed office May 15, 2018

Judge of the United States Court of Appeals for the Sixth Circuit
- In office November 26, 2002 – May 15, 2018
- Appointed by: George W. Bush
- Preceded by: Eugene E. Siler Jr.
- Succeeded by: John Nalbandian

Personal details
- Born: John Marshall Rogers; June 26, 1948 (age 78) Rochester, New York, U.S.
- Education: Stanford University (BA); University of Michigan (JD)

John Marshall Rogers (born June 26, 1948) is a Senior United States circuit judge of the United States Court of Appeals for the Sixth Circuit.

== Background ==
Rogers was born in Rochester, New York. He received a B.A. from Stanford University in 1970 and a J.D. from the University of Michigan Law School in 1974. He was in the United States Army Reserve from 1970 to 1998. Rogers was an Appellate lawyer for the United States Department of Justice Civil Division from 1974 to 1978. He was a Professor of law, University of Kentucky College of Law from 1978 to 2002.

== Federal judicial service ==
Rogers was nominated to that court by President George W. Bush on December 19, 2001 to fill a seat vacated by Judge Eugene Edward Siler, Jr. His nomination was confirmed by the United States Senate on November 14, 2002 by a voice vote. He received his commission on November 26, 2002. He assumed senior status on May 15, 2018.

== Notable opinions ==
Judge Rogers is one of the Sixth Circuit's most prolific judges. Over a five-year span, Judge Rogers tied with Judge Jeffrey Sutton as the author of the most opinions.

On June 3, 2010, Judge Rogers (joined by Judge Siler) interpreted a union contract agreement between Detroit Diesel Corporation (owned by Daimler AG) and UAW Local 163 as altering the terms of DDC's obligations to its retirees. On that interpretation of their union contract, retirees (applies to the 1993–2004 retirees) now pay 66% of their pension towards their medical insurance.

On March 17, 2006, Judge Rogers dissented from a decision of a Sixth Circuit majority panel in Brentwood Academy v. Tennessee Secondary School Athletic Association, 442 F.3d 410 (6th Cir. 2006). Contrary to the majority, Judge Rogers concluded that the First Amendment of the U.S. Constitution does not prevent government-run athletic associations from limiting or prohibiting their members from recruiting student athletes. Judge Rogers reasoned as follows: "This is no more a case involving our nation's ideal of freedom of expression than a case involving a coach who is thrown out of a game for talking back to a referee." The U.S. Supreme Court subsequently granted a writ of certiorari to the Sixth Circuit in the same case and took the same position as Judge Rogers on the First Amendment issue. The Court held that "[t]he antirecruiting rule strikes nowhere near the heart of the First Amendment." Tennessee Secondary Sch. Athletic Ass'n v. Brentwood Acad.

Judge Rogers authored a notable majority opinion in ACLU v. Bredesen, 441 F.3d 370 (6th Cir. 2006). Over the dissent of Circuit Judge Boyce Martin, Judge Rogers held that specialty license plates bearing a government-controlled message qualify as "government speech." Such license plates, as a result, do not create a "forum" for speech that is subject to First Amendment viewpoint-neutrality requirements. In Bredesen, the Tennessee state legislature had authorized a "Choose Life" license plate but had rejected during legislative consideration a license plate with a conflicting message. The majority opinion authored by Judge Rogers held that "the medium in this case, a government-issued license plate that every reasonable person knows to be government-issued, . . . conveys a government message." The First Amendment, the opinion reasoned, does not require state governments to issue contradictory messages to remain viewpoint neutral. For instance, a government entity that gives out "Register and Vote" pins is not compelled by the Constitution to issue "Don't Vote" pins. In the years following Bredesen, every other circuit court to address the issue disagreed with its interpretation of the First Amendment. The Fifth Circuit observed as follows in an opinion holding that specialty license plates are not government speech: "The Sixth Circuit's conclusion that specialty license plates are government speech makes it the sole outlier among our sister circuits." Texas Div., Sons of Confederate Veterans, Inc. v. Vandergriff, 759 F.3d 388, 396 (5th Cir. 2014). The U.S. Supreme Court subsequently granted certiorari and reversed the Fifth Circuit's decision in Walker v. Texas Division, Sons of Confederate Veterans. In an opinion that echoed the Bredesen ruling, the U.S. Supreme Court ruled 5–4 that specialty license plates are government speech.

Legal offices
Preceded by Eugene Edward Siler Jr.	Judge of the United States Court of Appeals for the Sixth Circuit; 2002–2018	Succeeded by John B. Nalbandian
