= Daniel Cameron (American politician) =

American attorney and politician (born 1985)

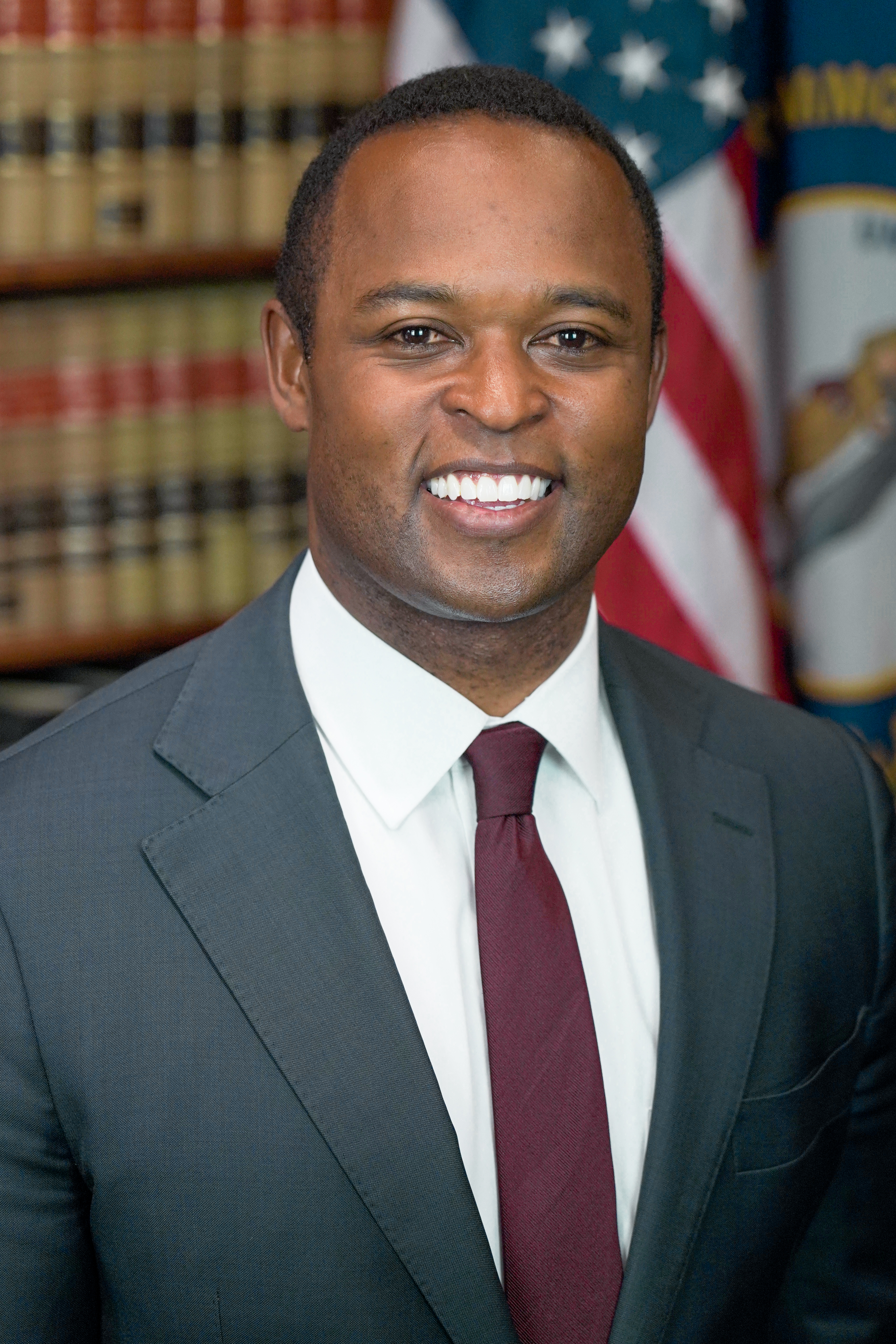
- Official portrait, 2021

51st Attorney General of Kentucky
- In office December 17, 2019 (Note: Acting: December 17, 2019 – January 6, 2020) – January 1, 2024
- Governor: Andy Beshear
- Preceded by: Andy Beshear
- Succeeded by: Russell Coleman

Personal details
- Born: Daniel Jay Cameron; November 22, 1985 (age 40) Plano, Texas, U.S.
- Party: Republican
- Spouse(s): Elizabeth Cameron (m. 2016; div. 2017) Makenze Evans (m. 2020)
- Children: 3
- Education: University of Louisville (BS, JD)

Daniel Jay Cameron (born November 22, 1985) is an American attorney and politician who served as the 51st attorney general of Kentucky from 2019 to 2024. A member of the Republican Party, Cameron was the first African American and the first Republican since 1943 to be elected to the office. He was also the Republican nominee in the 2023 Kentucky gubernatorial election, losing to Democratic incumbent Andy Beshear. Cameron ran for the U.S. Senate seat being vacated by Mitch McConnell in 2026, but lost the Republican nomination to Andy Barr.

Born in Plano, Texas, Cameron moved to Elizabethtown, Kentucky, as a child. He attended the University of Louisville for his undergraduate and legal education. Cameron worked as a law clerk for U.S. district judge Gregory F. Van Tatenhove for two years and was then legal counsel to Senate majority leader Mitch McConnell from 2015 to 2017, who has been described as his mentor. In September 2020, he was among the final 20 additions to President Donald Trump's updated list of his potential Supreme Court nominees.

Cameron ran in the 2019 Kentucky Attorney General election, receiving Trump's endorsement after the primary. He won with 57.7% of the vote. As attorney general, Cameron unsuccessfully challenged several of Beshear's COVID-19 restrictions. Following the killing of Breonna Taylor, Cameron announced the decision of his office as special prosecutor not to charge the two police officers who had shot and killed her, leading to widespread protests against Cameron's decision.

== Early life and education ==
Cameron was born in Plano, Texas. He was raised in Elizabethtown, Kentucky. His mother was a professor at Elizabethtown Community and Technical College, and his father owned a local coffee shop. Cameron attended John Hardin High School in neighboring Radcliff. (Note: While John Hardin High has an Elizabethtown mailing address, it is physically located within the Radcliff city limits.)

Cameron was awarded a scholarship sponsored by Senator Mitch McConnell to attend the University of Louisville, at which point he met McConnell for the first time. He was a redshirt freshman defensive back on the 2006 Louisville Cardinals football team, coming off the bench for limited playing time in the first two games. He graduated from the University of Louisville with a B.S. in 2008. In 2011, he earned a J.D. from the University of Louisville School of Law where he was president of the Student Bar Association.

== Early career ==
Cameron was a law clerk for Judge Gregory F. Van Tatenhove of the U.S. District Court for the Eastern District of Kentucky for two years, from 2011 to 2013. From 2013 to 2015, for 18 months he worked for the law firm Stites & Harbison.

From 2015 to 2017, Cameron served as legal counsel to Senate Majority Leader Mitch McConnell, for whom Tatenhove himself had previously worked. He was responsible for making sure that the office complied with Senate ethics rules, and helped shepherd the confirmations of conservative federal judges including Neil Gorsuch.

In 2017, Cameron returned to Louisville and joined the law firm Frost Brown Todd as a senior associate in government affairs.

== Attorney General of Kentucky ==
=== Campaign ===
Cameron ran for Attorney General of Kentucky in 2019 and defeated state senator Wil Schroder in the Republican primary by a margin of 132,400 (55.3%) votes to 106,950 (44.7%) votes. After the primary, he was endorsed by President Donald Trump. In the November 2019 general election, Cameron defeated the Democratic nominee, former attorney general Greg Stumbo, with 57.8% of the vote.

He was the first Republican elected to be attorney general of Kentucky since Eldon S. Dummit, who served from 1944 to 1948. He is Kentucky's first African-American attorney general. Following Republican former lieutenant governor Jenean Hampton, Cameron became Kentucky's second African-American statewide officer, and the first to be independently elected (given that Hampton had shared the 2015 gubernatorial ticket with Matt Bevin).

=== Attorney general ===
Cameron's term as attorney general was scheduled to begin on January 6, 2020, but incumbent Andy Beshear resigned the post on December 10, 2019, to facilitate his inauguration as Governor of Kentucky. On December 17, 2019, Beshear signed an executive order appointing Cameron to serve the remainder of his term as attorney general. Cameron was sworn into office by U.S. District Judge Gregory F. Van Tatenhove, for whom Cameron had clerked after graduating from law school.

=== Abortion ===
On March 27, 2020, Cameron called for halting abortions in Kentucky during the coronavirus pandemic, arguing it was an elective medical procedure that should fall under the statewide ban for the duration of the pandemic. During the closing days of the legislative session, the Kentucky legislature voted to give the attorney general power to regulate abortion clinics, but the legislation was vetoed by Beshear.

=== Pandemic ===
Cameron initiated unsuccessful legal challenges to executive actions that Governor Beshear took to combat the spread of COVID-19. In a court filing in July 2020, Cameron asked a state judge to invalidate all of Beshear's COVID-19 orders, and to bar the governor from issuing or enforcing any further COVID-19 order. Cameron described his request as an attempt "to protect the rights of Kentuckians"; Beshear condemned Cameron's motion as "scary and reckless," and said it would endanger public health, lead to more deaths, and harm the economy. Beshear noted that Cameron's filing called for the invalidation of executive action that required face masks in public places, imposed restrictions on public gatherings, expanded workers' compensation eligibility for workers who were under quarantine due to exposure to the virus, and the waiver of co-pays, deductibles, and other costs associated with COVID-19-related healthcare.

In an interim order in July 2020, the Kentucky Supreme Court blocked efforts by Cameron and lower courts to nullify the executive orders, pending the state Supreme Court's own review. In November 2020, the Kentucky Supreme Court unanimously upheld the constitutionality of Beshear's emergency coronavirus executive orders.

In December 2020, an initial ruling by Judge Gregory F. Van Tatenhove of the Federal District Court in Frankfort, Kentucky (for whom Cameron had clerked for two years), found in favor of Cameron in his lawsuit challenging Beshear's order to temporarily close all elementary, middle, and high schools to combat the pandemic. The U.S. Supreme Court overturned the trial court's opinion and held against Cameron.

=== Bankers association lawsuit ===
In November 2022, the Kentucky Bankers Association, which includes 150 banks doing business in Kentucky, sued Cameron in Franklin Circuit Court. Cameron had the case removed to the U.S. District Court for the Eastern District of Kentucky where it appeared before Judge Gregory Van Tatenhove, for whom Cameron had previously served as a law clerk. The court said Cameron displayed "amazing and disturbing broad overreach" by overstepping his legal authority and that Cameron lacked the authority to demand detailed information from banks as part of an investigation into their environmental lending practices, calling it a big government intrusion on private businesses that could create "an ongoing state surveillance system." Ballard Cassady, CEO of the association, said: "Kentucky banks must be allowed to make good business decisions for their bank, their customers and community without worrying about how they relate to broader ideological or political goals."

=== Breonna Taylor killing ===
On March 13, 2020, Breonna Taylor was killed by police gunfire when plainclothes officers who were serving a search warrant were confronted by an armed man inside her apartment and fired 32 shots. This killing led to protests across the United States. While Cameron could have appointed a special prosecutor, he instead opted to have his office act as special prosecutor in the case, because of the "importance of this matter...." More than six months after Taylor's killing, Cameron announced the decision of his office as special prosecutor, following the conclusion of a state grand jury investigation into Taylor's shooting.

Cameron's office decided not to charge the two police officers who had shot Taylor six times, killing her. Separately, a third officer—who had not shot Taylor—was charged with wanton endangerment, for accidentally endangering the lives of three of Taylor's neighbors by shooting into an adjacent apartment. Cameron's announcement led to widespread grief, fury, protests, chanting crowds marching in cities across the United States, and the shooting of two police officers in Louisville.

On July 14, 2020, over 100 protestors organized by the social justice organization Until Freedom marched to Cameron's house and held a sit-in on his front lawn, demanding that charges be brought against the officers who had shot and killed Taylor. Police officers arrested 87 protestors, including Houston Texans wide receiver Kenny Stills and Porsha Williams (a member of the cast of The Real Housewives of Atlanta), and charged them each with several crimes including Intimidating a Participant in the Legal Process, a Class D felony. Cameron accused the protestors of trespassing on his private property and alleged the protest's purpose was to "escalate" tension and division in the community.

On September 23, 2020, Cameron announced the indictment of former officer Brett Hankison on three counts of wanton endangerment. The charges weren't for killing Taylor, but rather for firing a weapon into the home of a family living next door to Taylor's apartment.

At the same time, however, Cameron's office decided not to charge officers Jonathan Mattingly and Myles Cosgrove, who had shot Taylor six times and killed her, with any crimes, as Cameron decided that they had not engaged in any wrongdoing. Cameron said that their firing their weapons into Taylor's apartment was a justified use of force.

At a news conference announcing the wanton endangerment charges against Hankison, Cameron appeared to choke up, and said "My heart breaks for the loss of Miss Taylor." Cameron stated at the news conference that he had walked the grand jury through "every homicide offense, and also presented all of the information that was available," and that it was the grand jury that "made the determination" to not bring charges against the officers who had killed Taylor. The Louisville Courier Journal raised questions, however, about whether the grand jury was allowed to decide if charges should have been pressed against Mattingly and Cosgrove—or whether, instead, prosecutors had decided themselves that the officers had acted in self-defense, and not submitted the issue to the grand jury. Attorneys for Hankison and Walker requested the release of the grand jury transcript and related evidence.

On September 28, 2020, a grand juror filed a court motion stating that Cameron had mischaracterized the grand jury proceedings, and was "using grand jurors as a shield to deflect accountability and responsibility" for charging decisions. Grand jurors said that Cameron only presented the grand jury with possible charges for Hankison, but not for the other two officers who had shot and killed Taylor. A judge ordered the release of the grand jury proceedings' recording. One day later, Cameron said that he had not recommended murder charges to the grand jury, but maintained that he presented "a thorough and complete case" to the grand jurors. Cameron then filed objections with the court, seeking to forbid the grand jurors from speaking publicly about what instructions they had received from his office, but Judge Annie O'Connell of Jefferson County Circuit Court refused to countenance his objections, writing that they "read as theatrical Sturm und Drang."

In January 2021, three grand jurors filed a petition with the Kentucky House of Representatives asking that Cameron be impeached, saying he mishandled the case. They also said that Cameron lied and fed misinformation to the media in an effort to make himself look desirable, and to avoid accountability. They said that while Cameron stated to the public that homicide charges against the officers were a possibility, that was not at all true, as the only charge that was presented to the grand jury was a wanton endangerment charge against an officer for firing his weapon into a nearby apartment. They also demanded that Cameron be disqualified from holding office in Kentucky in the future.

In August 2022, after two years of unresolved questions that focused national attention on the case, the United States Department of Justice intervened and filed charges against four of the officers involved in the killing of Taylor. They were ex-Detectives Hankison and Joshua Jaynes, plus Detective Kelly Goodlett and Sergeant Kyle Meany. The US Department of Justice contended that officers conspired to file untrue statements, had made false statements to obtain a search warrant to search the victim's home, and engaged in a cover-up after her death. The case against Officer Jaynes and Officer Meany were dismissed by Judge Charles Simpson III.

In September 2022, the Louisville branch of the NAACP asked Cameron to resign, saying he failed to conduct a fair investigation into Breonna Taylor's shooting death, and was unfit to remain in office. The NAACP also asked the Kentucky General Assembly to remove him if he did not agree to step down on his own. The NAACP added: "The recent federal indictments of four Louisville Metro Police officers involved in the Breonna Taylor killing has highlighted, demonstrated, and proven the insufficiency of the state investigation led by the Attorney General of the Commonwealth and an absence of an understanding of the Commonwealth's criminal laws."

=== National politics ===
After his election as Kentucky attorney general, Cameron was seen by some analysts as a rising star in the Republican Party. He spoke at the 2020 Republican National Convention on August 24, 2020. In September 2020, Cameron appeared on a 20-person shortlist of potential U.S. Supreme Court nominees by President Donald Trump.

== 2023 gubernatorial campaign ==
Results by county

Cameron announced his candidacy for governor on May 11, 2022. He criticized incumbent Democratic governor Andy Beshear's emergency orders during the COVID-19 pandemic and emphasized his opposition to abortion. Trump endorsed Cameron's gubernatorial bid. In the Republican primary, Cameron defeated challengers Kelly Craft and Ryan Quarles. On July 19, 2023, Cameron announced State Senator Robby Mills as his running mate for Lieutenant Governor. Cameron was the first major-party African-American nominee for governor in the Commonwealth of Kentucky's history. He ran against Beshear in the election on November 7 that year, losing 53% to 47%.

== 2026 U.S. Senate campaign ==
On February 20, 2025, Cameron announced his intention to run for the U.S. Senate seat being vacated by Mitch McConnell in 2026. In July 2025, Politico reported that Cameron had struggled to raise money during the previous quarter for the Republican primary. Cameron received tangential support from U.S. Senator Rand Paul as well as various members of the Kentucky General Assembly, such as state representatives Savannah Maddox, Ryan Bivens and Peyton Griffee; and state senators Lindsey Tichenor, Robby Mills and Gary Boswell.

Cameron was defeated in the Republican primary, garnering 30.8% of the vote against U.S. Congressman Andy Barr's 60.5%.

== Personal life ==
Cameron's 2016 marriage to Elizabeth Cameron ended in divorce the following year. He married a second time on July 31, 2020, to Makenze Evans, a 27-year-old schoolteacher. Senator Mitch McConnell attended their wedding, which took place during Covid restrictions. They had their first child on January 5, 2022. Cameron faced criticism on social media for hosting an engagement party in June 2020 during the time of the long unfinished investigation into Breonna Taylor's death without any charges being filed.

== See also ==
- Donald Trump Supreme Court candidates

Party political offices
Preceded by Whitney Westerfield	Republican nominee for Attorney General of Kentucky; 2019	Succeeded by Russell Coleman
Preceded by Matt Bevin	Republican nominee for Governor of Kentucky; 2023	Most recent
Legal offices
Preceded by Andy Beshear	Attorney General of Kentucky; 2019–2024; Acting: 2019–2020	Succeeded by Russell Coleman
