= Amul Thapar =

American federal judge (born 1969)

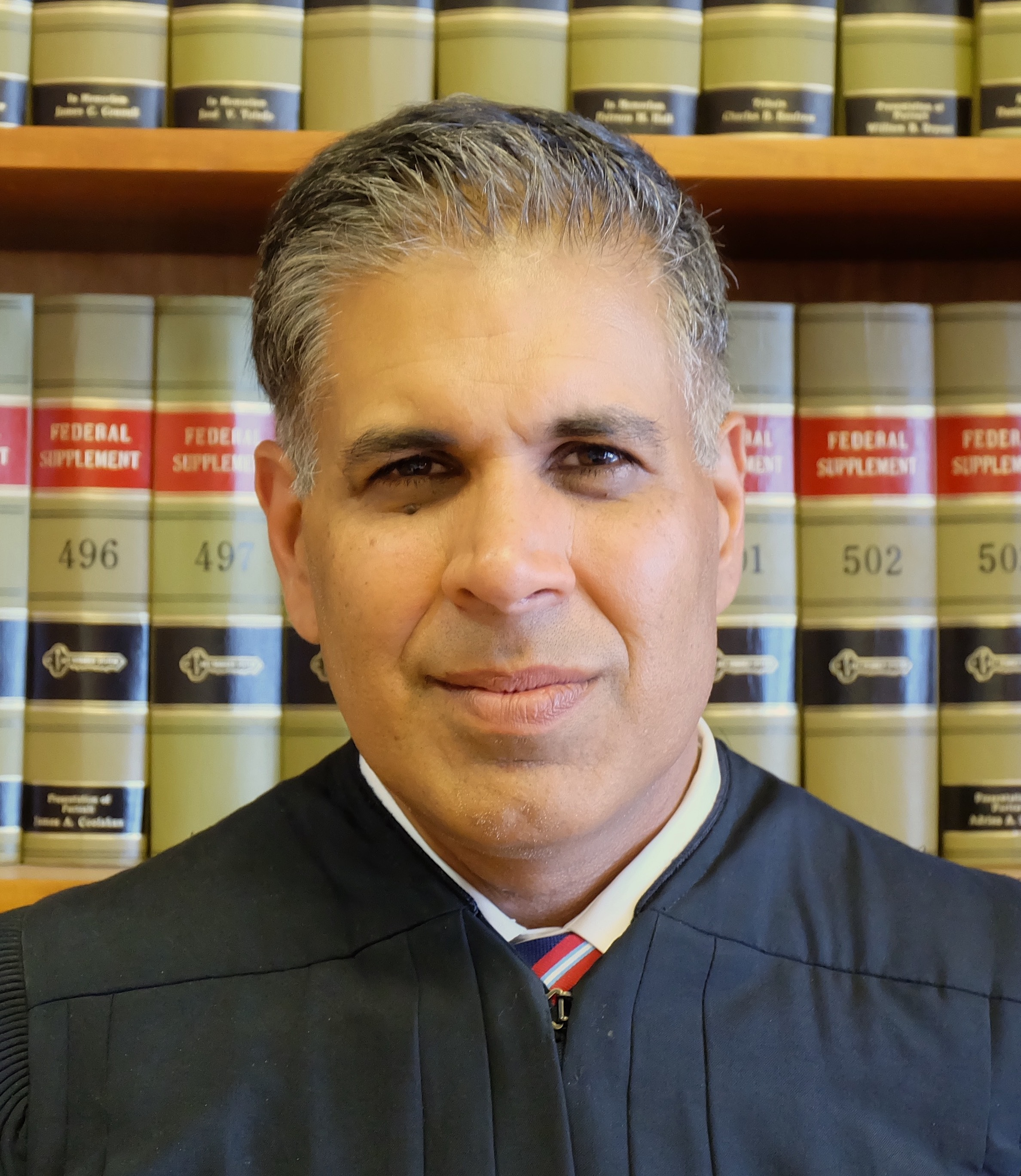
- Official portrait, 2020

Judge of the United States Court of Appeals for the Sixth Circuit
- Incumbent
- Assumed office May 25, 2017
- Appointed by: Donald Trump
- Preceded by: Boyce F. Martin Jr.

Judge of the United States District Court for the Eastern District of Kentucky
- In office January 4, 2008 – May 30, 2017
- Appointed by: George W. Bush
- Preceded by: Joseph Martin Hood
- Succeeded by: Robert E. Wier

United States Attorney for the Eastern District of Kentucky
- In office March 20, 2006 – January 4, 2008
- President: George W. Bush
- Preceded by: Gregory F. Van Tatenhove
- Succeeded by: Kerry B. Harvey

Personal details
- Born: Amul Roger Thapar; 1969 (age 56–57) Troy, Michigan, U.S.
- Spouse: Kim Schulte
- Children: 3
- Education: Boston College (BS); University of California, Berkeley (JD)

Amul Roger Thapar (born 1969) is an American lawyer and jurist serving as a United States circuit judge of the United States Court of Appeals for the Sixth Circuit. He was appointed in 2017 by President Donald Trump, having previously served as a United States district judge of the United States District Court for the Eastern District of Kentucky from 2008 to 2017 and as the United States attorney for the Eastern District of Kentucky from 2006 to 2008. Thapar was Trump's first Court of Appeals appointment and second judicial appointment after Justice Neil Gorsuch. Thapar has been discussed as a candidate for the Supreme Court of the United States.

== Early life and education ==
Thapar was born in 1969, in Troy, Michigan, to a Punjabi family that had immigrated to the United States from India. He grew up in Toledo, Ohio, where his father, Raj Thapar, owns a heating and air-conditioning supply business. Thapar worked for his father's business driving the truck. His mother, Veena Bhalla, owned a restaurant. She sold her successful business after the September 11 attacks and chose to serve as a civilian clinical social worker assigned to assist veterans.

After graduating from high school in 1987, Thapar attended Boston College, graduating in 1991 with a Bachelor of Science degree. He attended Ohio State University's Moritz College of Law for one year before transferring to the UC Berkeley School of Law, from which he graduated in 1994 with a Juris Doctor.

== Career ==
=== Private practice ===
After law school, Thapar was a law clerk to Judge S. Arthur Spiegel of the United States District Court for the Southern District of Ohio from 1994 to 1996 and to Sixth Circuit judge Nathaniel R. Jones from 1996 to 1997. He then entered private practice at the law firm Williams & Connolly in Washington, D.C., from 1997 to 1999, where he volunteered to represent the Becket Fund for Religious Liberty pro bono. In addition to being a practicing trial attorney, Thapar was also a trial advocacy instructor at the Georgetown University Law Center from 1999 to 2000. He was an assistant United States attorney for the District of Columbia from 1999 to 2000. He was general counsel to Equalfooting.com from 2000 to 2001. He returned to private practice at the Squire, Sanders & Dempsey firm in Cincinnati, Ohio from 2001 to 2002, before entering a life of public service. He was an adjunct professor at the University of Cincinnati College of Law from 1995 to 1997 and from 2002 to 2006.

=== United States attorney ===
Thapar returned to the United States Attorney's Office as an assistant United States attorney for the Southern District of Ohio from 2002 to 2006. He was then nominated and confirmed to the position of United States attorney for the Eastern District of Kentucky, where he served from 2006 to 2007.

While an Assistant United States Attorney, he was appointed to the Attorney General's Advisory Committee (AGAC) and chaired the AGAC's Controlled Substances and Asset Forfeiture subcommittee. He also served on its Terrorism and National Security subcommittee, Violent Crime subcommittee, and Child Exploitation working group.

Thapar also led the Southern Ohio Mortgage Fraud Task Force, which successfully prosecuted approximately 40 perpetrators of mortgage fraud. He led the successful investigation and prosecution of a conspiracy ring to provide illegal immigrants with fraudulent driver's licenses.

== Federal judicial service ==
=== Service as district court judge ===
On May 24, 2007, President George W. Bush nominated Thapar to the United States District Court for the Eastern District of Kentucky seat vacated by judge Joseph Martin Hood. The American Bar Association rated Thapar Unanimously Well Qualified, with one committee member abstaining. Thapar was confirmed by the Senate on December 13, 2007. He received his commission on January 4, 2008. According to the Trump administration, that appointment made Thapar the first United States federal judge of South Asian descent. His service on the district court terminated on May 30, 2017, upon elevation to the court of appeals.

Thapar began his career "First in Ohio as a line prosecutor pursuing drug dealers, gang members, and terrorist financiers. Then in Kentucky as a U.S. attorney and a trial judge known for his work ethic, writing, and teaching: he covered 3 far-flung courthouses in his own district (Covington, London, and Pikeville), volunteered to hear additional cases in Texas and on the Sixth and Eleventh Circuits, wrote award–winning opinions, and lectured regularly at UVA, Vanderbilt, Yale, Harvard, and other top schools."

As a district court judge, Thapar heard cases in Covington, Kentucky outside of Cincinnati, as well as in London and Pikeville. While on the bench, Thapar has served as an adjunct professor at Vanderbilt University Law School, University of Virginia School of Law, and Northern Kentucky University. He has been an invited guest at Federalist Society programs.

Thapar is known for his folksy and engaging writing style that is meant to be understood by everyday people. In an opinion about amount in controversy requirements holding that the amount was "exactly one penny short of the jurisdictional minimum of the federal courts" (Freeland v. Liberty Mut. Fire Ins. Co., 632 F.3d 250, 252 (6th Cir. 2011)), Thapar wrote about the humble penny, which "tend[s] to sit at the bottom of change jars or vanish into the cracks between couch cushions." In another case, Thapar explained that if the owner of a bar "promised to pour [a] man a glass of Pappy Van Winkle but gave him a slug of Old Crow instead, well, that would be fraud."

==== Notable cases as a district court judge ====
- In 2013, Thapar was assigned to a case in the United States District Court for the Eastern District of Tennessee due to the impending retirement of Judge Thomas Phillips from the Knoxville court. The case involved a high-profile break-in by peace protesters at the Y-12 National Security Complex's Highly Enriched Uranium Materials Facility in July 2012. The three protesters, aged 57 to 82, were convicted.
- On May 10, 2013, Thapar cited the definition of the federal crime of terrorism to keep the protesters in jail until their sentencing on February 18, 2014. Thapar sentenced one of the defendants, 84-year-old nun Megan Rice, to 35 months in prison for breaking into the U.S. nuclear weapons complex and using blood to deface a bunker holding bomb-grade uranium, a demonstration that exposed serious security flaws; Rice had asked not to receive leniency and said she would be honored to receive a life sentence. The two other defendants were sentenced to more than five years in prison, in part because they had much longer criminal histories. The activists' attorneys asked the judge to sentence them to time they had already served, about nine months, because of their record of goodwill. Thapar said he was concerned they showed no remorse and he wanted the punishment to be a deterrent for other activists.
- On appeal, the Sixth Circuit reversed the most serious convictions against the protesters and, in May 2015, ordered their immediate release from custody, noting that the protesters' sentencing guidelines now recommended substantially less time in custody than they had already served.

=== Court of appeals service ===
On March 21, 2017, President Donald Trump nominated Thapar to the United States Court of Appeals for the Sixth Circuit. Thapar received a unanimous well qualified rating from the American Bar Association. On April 26, 2017, the United States Senate Committee on the Judiciary held a hearing on his nomination. On May 18, 2017, his nomination was reported out of committee by an 11–8 vote, with one Democrat not voting. On May 24, 2017, the United States Senate invoked cloture on his nomination by a 52–48 vote. On May 25, 2017, his nomination was confirmed by a 52–44 vote. He received his commission on the same day. Thapar became the second Indian American judge of United States courts of appeals.

The Lexington Herald-Leader reported when Thapar was nominated to the 6th Circuit that "lawyers across the political spectrum praised [him] as a highly intellectual, thoughtful and hard-working judge."

Thapar also speaks at law schools across the country on originalism, textualism, civility, and other topics. He teaches at the University of Virginia Law School on the judicial philosophies of Justices Scalia and Thomas.

In 2018, Thapar published a law review article about the role of judges. He criticized "pragmatic" judging and argued that judges should not be "politicians in robes."

Thapar's opinion for a unanimous panel in Novak v. City of Parma (2022) held that it was reasonable for officers to think that a man might have been impersonating a police officer when he created a parody Facebook page for the Parma, Ohio, police department. Since impersonation, unlike parody, is not protected speech, Thapar reasoned that there was probable cause for the arrest and thus it could not be retaliatory under Nieves v. Bartlett.

=== Notable cases as a circuit court judge ===
- In Vitolo v. Guzman, 999 F.3d 353 (6th Cir. 2021), Judge Thapar authored the majority opinion holding it unconstitutional for the federal government to "allocate limited coronavirus relief funds based on the race and sex of the applicants." Judge Thapar said, quoting the Chief Justice, "It is indeed ‘a sordid business' to divide ‘us up by race.'" His opinion ordered the government to process the plaintiffs' grant applications "without regard to … the applicants' race or sex."
- In Meriwether v. Hartop, 992 F.3d 492 (6th Cir. 2021), Judge Thapar authored the unanimous opinion, finding that the First Amendment protected a professor's right to refuse to use a student's preferred "gender-identity-based pronouns" when it conflicted with his own deeply held religious beliefs. In that case, Shawnee State University had ordered Professor Meriwether to use a student's preferred pronouns despite the fact it would violate Meriwether's religious convictions. Judge Thapar wrote that the professor "plausibly alleged that Shawnee State violated his First Amendment rights by compelling his speech or silence and casting a pall of orthodoxy over the classroom." Judge Thapar added that "public universities do not have a license to act as classroom thought police."
- In Memphis Center for Reproductive Health v. Slatery, 14 F.4th 409 (6th Cir. 2021), Judge Thapar partially dissented. The case involved a challenge to a Tennessee law that "limit[ed] abortions after a baby's heartbeat can be heard." While Judge Thapar acknowledged that Tennessee's law contradicted the U.S. Supreme Court's decisions in Roe v. Wade, 410 U.S. 113 (1973), and Planned Parenthood of Southeastern Pennsylvania v. Casey, 505 U.S. 833 (1992), Thapar explained "Roe and Casey [were] wrong as a matter of constitutional text, structure, and history." Judge Thapar said that the Founders left policy disputes like abortion to state legislators, "who could pass laws that reflect their constituents' oft-changing views on these difficult policy questions." The case was later vacated and remanded in light of the U.S. Supreme Court's decision in Dobbs v. Jackson Women's Health Organization, 597 U.S. 215 (2022), which overruled Roe and Casey. Justice Alito's majority opinion for the Court in Dobbs twice cited Judge Thapar's partial dissent in Memphis Center.
- In United States v. Schrank, 975 F.3d 534 (6th Cir. 2020), Judge Thapar wrote a unanimous opinion ordering that the court below resentence Dane Schrank, who was convicted of possession of child pornography after downloading "nearly 1,000 images of babies and toddlers being forcibly, violently, and sadistically penetrated." The trial judge imposed a 12-month sentence of home confinement for Schrank, despite the fact the Sentencing Guidelines recommended between 97 and 120 months in prison. Judge Thapar held that the court below was much too lenient on Schrank's sentence: "Child pornography is an abhorrent offense that scars the children affected forever" thus Schrank's sentence "must reflect the severity of his depraved conduct." Judge Thapar's opinion also ordered that the case be reassigned to a new district judge for resentencing.
- In Tiger Lily, LLC v. U.S. Department of Housing & Urban Development, 5 F.4th 666 (6th Cir. 2021), Judge Thapar joined an opinion holding that the CDC lacks the authority to impose a national eviction moratorium. Judge Thapar also wrote a separate concurrence calling on the U.S. Supreme Court to "consider breathing new life" into the nondelegation doctrine to protect the separation of powers. Quoting Justice Gorsuch, Judge Thapar wrote, "The constitutional design is frustrated if ‘Congress could merely announce vague aspirations and then assign others the responsibility of adopting legislation to realize its goals."
- In Davenport v. MacLaren, 975 F.3d 537 (6th Cir. 2020), a panel of the Sixth Circuit vacated the first-degree murder conviction of Earl Davenport, a man accused of strangling Annette White. The Sixth Circuit voted 8 to 7 against rehearing the case en banc. Judge Thapar authored an opinion dissenting from the denial of rehearing en banc, saying: "Despite the overwhelming evidence of Davenport's guilt, a panel majority voted to vacate his conviction. It did so without even applying AEDPA deference to the state court's harmless-error determination." The U.S. Supreme Court then granted certiorari in the case and, citing Judge Thapar, ruled that the Sixth Circuit erred.
- In L.W. ex rel. Williams v. Skrmetti, 83 F.3d 460 (6th Cir. 2023), Judge Thapar joined an opinion authored by Chief Judge Sutton that allowed Tennessee to enforce a law "that prohibits healthcare providers from performing gender-affirming surgeries and administering hormone or puberty blockers to transgender minors." The opinion concludes that "it is difficult for anyone to be sure about predicting the long-term consequences of abandoning age limits of any sort for these treatments. That is precisely the kind of situation in which life-tenured judges construing a difficult-to-amend Constitution should be humble and careful about announcing new substantive due process or equal protection rights that limit accountable elected officials from sorting out these medical, social, and policy challenges."
- In In re MCP No. 165, OSHA, Interim Final Rule: COVID-19 Vaccination & Testing, 20 F.4th 264 (6th Cir. 2021), Judge Thapar joined an opinion by Chief Judge Sutton dissenting from the denial of initial hearing en banc. The case concerned a rule issued by the Secretary of Labor requiring "roughly 80 million workers to become vaccinated or face a weekly self-financed testing requirement and a daily masking requirement." Chief Judge Sutton's opinion argues that the Secretary of Labor lacks "authority to impose this vaccine-or-test mandate."
- In United States v. Havis, 907 F.3d 439 (6th Cir. 2018), Judge Thapar authored an opinion that affirmed a criminal defendant's sentence. Judge Thapar also wrote a separate concurrence criticizing Auer deference, a doctrine requiring courts to defer to an agency's interpretations of its own regulations. According to Judge Thapar, Auer deference gives agencies an "immense power" to "make the rules and interpret the rules." Because of this, Judge Thapar said the doctrine needs "renewed and much needed scrutiny." Judge Thapar's concurrence was later cited by Justice Gorsuch’s concurrence in the judgment in Kisor v. Wilkie, 588 U.S. 558 (2019).

== Consideration for the Supreme Court ==
Thapar was first considered for the Supreme Court in 2016, when he was a federal district judge. He was considered a front-runner for an open seat. Thapar was included in a list of individuals that Republican presidential candidate Donald Trump "would consider as potential replacements for Justice Scalia at the United States Supreme Court."

After the June 2018 announcement by sitting Justice Anthony Kennedy that he would retire from the court, Thapar remained on a Trump "short-list." Thapar was one of six judges interviewed by President Trump early in July while being considered to fill the Kennedy vacancy, which was ultimately filled by the appointment of Brett Kavanaugh.

== Personal life ==
Raised culturally Hindu, Thapar converted to Catholicism upon his marriage to Kim Schulte, a Kentucky real estate agent. The couple reside in Covington, Kentucky with their three children.

Thapar engages in his community through volunteer work. At his confirmation hearing, Senator Mitch McConnell noted that Thapar had "founded a brand-new chapter of the well-respected Street Law program, which sends law school students into underprivileged high schools to teach the basic underpinnings of our legal system."

== Bibliography ==
Books authored or coauthored by Thapar

- Thapar, Amul (2023). The People's Justice: Clarence Thomas and the Constitutional Stories that Define Him. Simon & Schuster. ISBN 978-1-68451-452-6.

== See also ==
- List of Asian American jurists
- List of federal judges appointed by Donald Trump
- List of first minority male lawyers and judges in Kentucky
- List of first minority male lawyers and judges in the United States
- Donald Trump Supreme Court candidates

Legal offices
Preceded by Gregory F. Van Tatenhove	United States Attorney for the Eastern District of Kentucky; 2006–2008	Succeeded by Kerry B. Harvey
Preceded by Joseph Martin Hood	Judge of the United States District Court for the Eastern District of Kentucky; 2008–2017	Succeeded by Robert E. Wier
Preceded by Boyce F. Martin Jr.	Judge of the United States Court of Appeals for the Sixth Circuit; 2017–present	Incumbent
