= United States District Court for the Eastern District of Kentucky =

United States federal district court in Kentucky

Coordinates: 37.7°N 83.5°W

- (E.D. Ky.)
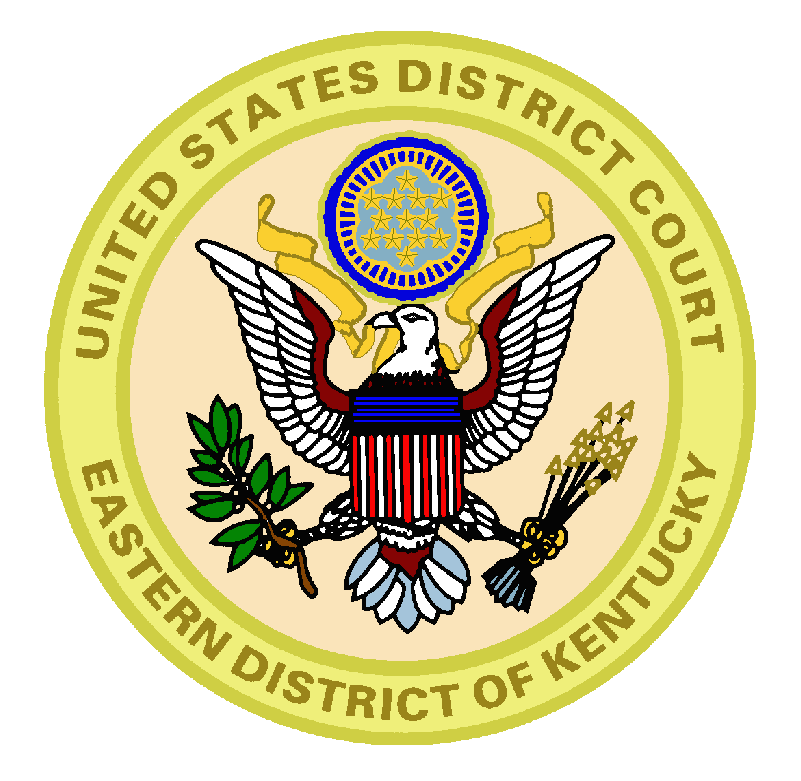

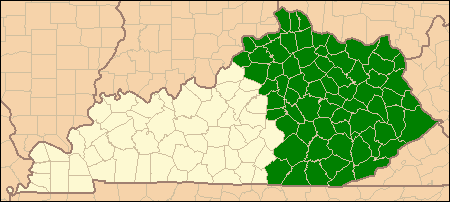
- Location: United States Post Office and Courthouse (Lexington) More locations: Ashland; Covington; Frankfort; London
- Appeals to: Sixth Circuit
- Established: February 12, 1901
- Judges: 6
- Chief Judge: David L. Bunning

Officers of the court
- U.S. Attorney: Jason D. Parman
- U.S. Marshal: Jeremy Honaker (acting)
- www.kyed.uscourts.gov

The United States District Court for the Eastern District of Kentucky (in case citations, E.D. Ky.) is the Federal district court whose jurisdiction comprises approximately the Eastern half of the Commonwealth of Kentucky. The United States Court of Appeals for the Sixth Circuit in Cincinnati, Ohio maintains appellate jurisdiction for the district (except for patent claims and claims against the U.S. government under the Tucker Act, which are appealed to the Federal Circuit).

== Jurisdiction ==
The Eastern District of Kentucky encompasses the following counties: Anderson, Bath, Bell, Boone, Bourbon, Boyd, Boyle, Bracken, Breathitt, Campbell, Carroll, Carter, Clark, Clay, Elliott, Estill, Fayette, Fleming, Floyd, Franklin, Gallatin, Garrard, Grant, Greenup, Harlan, Harrison, Henry, Jackson, Jessamine, Johnson, Kenton, Knott, Knox, Laurel, Lawrence, Lee, Leslie, Letcher, Lewis, Lincoln, McCreary, Madison, Magoffin, Martin, Mason, Menifee, Mercer, Montgomery, Morgan, Nicholas, Owen, Owsley, Pendleton, Perry, Pike, Powell, Pulaski, Robertson, Rockcastle, Rowan, Scott, Shelby, Trimble, Wayne, Whitley, Wolfe, and Woodford.

== History ==
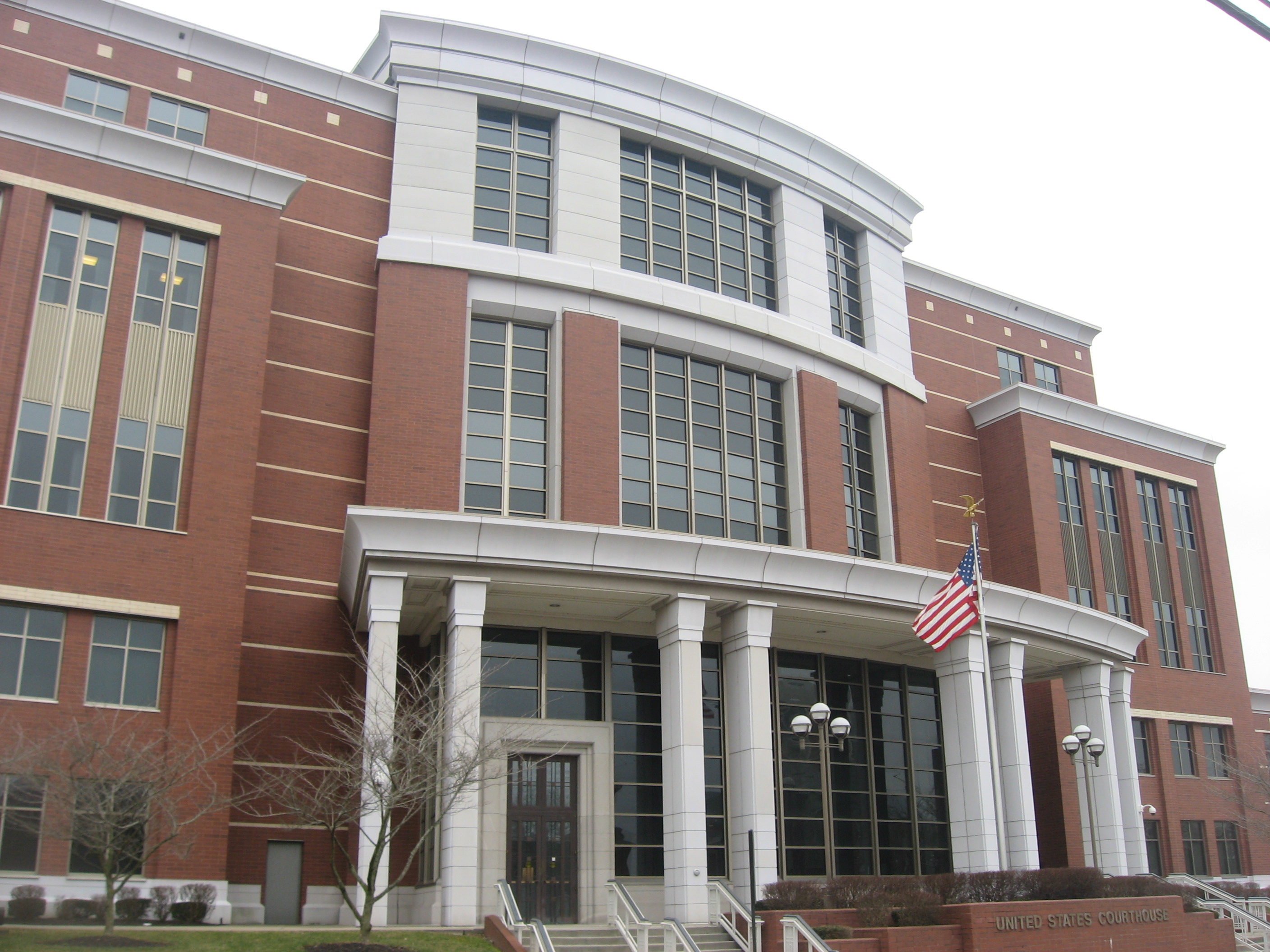
The federal courthouse at Covington, Kentucky

The United States District Court for the District of Kentucky was one of the original 13 courts established by the Judiciary Act of 1789, 1 Stat. 73, on September 24, 1789. At the time, Kentucky was not yet a state, but was within the territory of the state of Virginia. The District was unchanged when Kentucky became a state on June 1, 1792. On February 13, 1801, the Judiciary Act of 1801, 2 Stat. 89, abolished the U.S. district court in Kentucky, but the repeal of this Act restored the District on March 8, 1802, 2 Stat. 132. The District was subdivided into Eastern and Western Districts on February 12, 1901, by 31 Stat. 781.

== Meeting places ==
The court is based in Lexington and also holds sessions in Federal Courthouses in Ashland, Covington, Frankfort, and London.

From 1911 to 1985, the court held sessions in downtown Catlettsburg at the Federal Courthouse and Post Office building which still stands on the corner of 25th and Broadway. By 1980, the Eastern District had long outgrown the historic Catlettsburg facility and it was decided that a new facility should be constructed. City officials in neighboring Ashland requested that the new facility be located there instead of in Catlettsburg. They argued that Ashland, by being a larger city, was a superior choice to the much smaller Catlettsburg with more services and amenities such as lodging for overnight guests and better restaurant options. As a result, the Carl D. Perkins Federal Building and United States Courthouse was built in Ashland on U.S. Routes 23 and 60 (Greenup Avenue).

== U.S. Attorney ==
The United States Attorney's Office for the Eastern District of Kentucky represents the United States in civil and criminal litigation in the court. The United States attorney is currently Jason D. Parman.

- James H. Tinsley 1901–09
- James N. Sharp 1909–11
- Edwin P. Morrow 1911–14
- Thomas D. Slattery 1914–21
- Sawyer A. Smith 1921–33
- Mac Swinford 1933–37
- John T. Metcalf 1937–44
- Claude P. Stephens 1944–53
- Edwin R. Denney 1953–55
- Henry J. Cook 1955–60
- Jean L. Auxier 1960–61
- Bernard T. Moynahan Jr. 1961–63
- George I. Cline 1963–70
- Eugene E. Siler Jr. 1970–75
- Eldon L. Webb 1975–77
- Patrick J. Molloy 1977–81
- Joseph L. Famularo 1981
- Louis DeFalaise 1981–91
- Karen K. Caldwell 1991–93
- Joseph L. Famularo 1993–2001
- Gregory F. Van Tatenhove 2001–2005
- Amul Thapar 2006–2008
- James A. Zerhusen 2008–2010
- E.J. Walbourn 2010
- Kerry B. Harvey 2010–2017
- Robert M. Duncan Jr. 2017–2021
- Carlton S. Shier, IV 2021–2025
- Paul McCaffrey (acting) 2025–2026
- Jason D. Parman 2026–present

== Current judges ==
As of July 19, 2026:

#	Title	Judge	Duty station	Born	Term of service			Appointed by
#	Title	Judge	Duty station	Born	Active	Chief	Senior	Appointed by
16	Chief Judge	David Bunning	Covington	1966	2002–present	2025–present	—	G.W. Bush
14	District Judge	Karen K. Caldwell	Lexington	1956	2001–present	2012–2019	—	G.W. Bush
19	District Judge	Claria Boom (Note: Judge Boom is jointly appointed to the Eastern and Western Districts of Kentucky.)	London	1969	2018–present	—	—	Trump
20	District Judge	Robert E. Wier	Lexington	1967	2018–present	—	—	Trump
21	District Judge	Chad Meredith	Lexington	1981	2025–present	—	—	Trump
22	District Judge	vacant	—	—	—	—	—	—
8	Senior Judge	William Bertelsman	inactive	1936	1979–2001	1991–1998	2001–present	Carter
12	Senior Judge	Joseph Martin Hood	inactive	1942	1990–2007	2005–2007	2007–present	G.H.W. Bush
15	Senior Judge	Danny C. Reeves	Lexington	1957	2001–2025	2019–2025	2025–present	G.W. Bush

== Vacancies and pending nominations ==
Seat	Prior judge's duty station	Seat last held by	Vacancy reason	Date of vacancy	Nominee	Date of nomination
7	Frankfort	Gregory F. Van Tatenhove	Retirement	July 19, 2026	Daniel Ballou	September 14, 2026

== Former judges ==
#	Judge	Born–died	Active service	Chief Judge	Senior status	Appointed by	Reason for termination
1	Andrew Cochran	1854–1934	1901–1934 (Note: Recess appointment; formally nominated on December 5, 1901, confirmed by the United States Senate on December 17, 1901, and received commission the same day.)	—	—	McKinley (Note: Judge Cochran was given a recess appointment by President McKinley.); T. Roosevelt (Note: Judge Cochran was nominated by President McKinley but was appointed to the Court by (i.e., received his commission from) President Roosevelt.)	death
2	Hiram Church Ford	1884–1969	1935–1963	1948–1963	1963–1969	F. Roosevelt	death
3	Mac Swinford	1899–1975	1937–1975 (Note: Jointly appointed to the Eastern and Western Districts of Kentucky.)	1963–1969	—	F. Roosevelt	death
4	Bernard Moynahan Jr.	1918–1999	1963–1984	1969–1984	1984–1999	Kennedy	death
5	Howard Hermansdorfer	1931–2003	1972–1981	—	—	Nixon	resignation
6	Eugene E. Siler Jr.	1936–present	1975–1991	1984–1991	—	Ford	elevation
7	Scott Elgin Reed	1921–1994	1979–1988	—	1988–1994	Carter	death
9	Green Wix Unthank	1923–2013	1980–1988	—	1988–2013	Carter	death
10	Henry Rupert Wilhoit Jr.	1935–2022	1981–2000	1998–2000	2000–2022	Reagan	death
11	Karl Spillman Forester	1940–2014	1988–2005	2001–2005	2005–2014	Reagan	death
13	Jennifer B. Coffman	1948–present	1993–2013	2007–2012	—	Clinton	retirement
17	Gregory F. Van Tatenhove	1960–present	2006–2026	—	—	G.W. Bush	retirement
18	Amul Thapar	1969–present	2008–2017	—	—	G.W. Bush	elevation

== Chief judges ==
Chief judges have administrative responsibilities with respect to their district court. Unlike the Supreme Court, where one justice is specifically nominated to be chief, the office of chief judge rotates among the district court judges. To be chief, a judge must have been in active service on the court for at least one year, be under the age of 65, and have not previously served as chief judge.

A vacancy is filled by the judge highest in seniority among the group of qualified judges. The chief judge serves for a term of seven years, or until age 70, whichever occurs first. The age restrictions are waived if no members of the court would otherwise be qualified for the position.

When the office was created in 1948, the chief judge was the longest-serving judge who had not elected to retire, on what has since 1958 been known as senior status, or declined to serve as chief judge. After August 6, 1959, judges could not become or remain chief after turning 70 years old. The current rules have been in operation since October 1, 1982.

== Succession of seats ==
Seat 1
Seat established on February 12, 1901 by 31 Stat. 781
Cochran	1901–1934
Ford	1935–1963
Moynahan, Jr.	1963–1984
Seat abolished on September 30, 1984 (temporary judgeship expired)

Seat 2
Seat established on June 22, 1936 by 49 Stat. 1806 (concurrent with Western District)
Swinford	1937–1975
Siler Jr.	1975–1991
Coffman	1993–2013
Boom	2018–present

Seat 3
Seat established on June 2, 1970 by 84 Stat. 294
Hermansdorfer	1972–1981
Wilhoit, Jr.	1981–2000
Caldwell	2001–present

Seat 4
Seat established on October 20, 1978 by 92 Stat. 1629
Reed	1979–1988
Hood	1990–2007
Thapar	2008–2017
Wier	2018–present

Seat 5
Seat established on October 20, 1978 by 92 Stat. 1629
Bertelsman	1979–2001
Bunning	2002–present

Seat 6
Seat established on October 20, 1978 by 92 Stat. 1629 (temporary)
Seat became permanent upon the abolition of Seat 1 on September 30, 1984
Unthank	1980–1988
Seat abolished on June 14, 1988 (temporary judgeship expired)

Seat 7
Seat established on November 30, 1987 pursuant to 71 Stat. 586 (temporary)
Seat became permanent upon the abolition of Seat 6 on June 14, 1988
Forester	1988–2005
Van Tatenhove	2006–2026
vacant	2026–present

Seat 8
Seat established on December 21, 2000 by 114 Stat. 2762
Reeves	2001–2025
Meredith	2025–present

== See also ==
- Courts of Kentucky
- List of current United States district judges
- List of United States federal courthouses in Kentucky
