= Eugene E. Siler Jr. =

American judge (born 1936)

Eugene Siler

Senior Judge of the United States Court of Appeals for the Sixth Circuit
- Incumbent
- Assumed office December 31, 2001

Judge of the United States Court of Appeals for the Sixth Circuit
- In office September 16, 1991 – December 31, 2001
- Appointed by: George H. W. Bush
- Preceded by: Harry W. Wellford
- Succeeded by: John M. Rogers

Chief Judge of the United States District Court for the Eastern District of Kentucky
- In office September 30, 1984 – September 20, 1991
- Preceded by: Bernard T. Moynahan Jr.
- Succeeded by: William Bertelsman

Judge of the United States District Court for the Eastern District of Kentucky and the United States District Court for the Western District of Kentucky
- In office November 13, 1975 – September 20, 1991
- Appointed by: Gerald Ford
- Preceded by: Mac Swinford
- Succeeded by: Jennifer B. Coffman

United States Attorney for the Eastern District of Kentucky
- In office 1970–1975
- Appointed by: Richard Nixon
- Preceded by: George Cline
- Succeeded by: Eldon Webb

Personal details
- Born: Eugene Edward Siler Jr. October 19, 1936 (age 90) Williamsburg, Kentucky, U.S.
- Party: Republican
- Spouse: Chris Minnich
- Children: 2
- Parent: Eugene Siler (father)
- Education: Vanderbilt University (BA); University of Virginia (LLB); Georgetown University (LLM)

Military service
- Branch: United States Navy; Naval Reserve
- Years of service: 1958–1983
- Rank: Commander

Eugene Edward Siler Jr. (born October 19, 1936) is a Senior United States circuit judge of the United States Court of Appeals for the Sixth Circuit and a former United States District Judge of the United States District Court for the Eastern District of Kentucky and the United States District Court for the Western District of Kentucky.

== Early life and education ==
Siler was born in Williamsburg, Kentucky, to Lowell (Jones) and Eugene Siler. His father was a United States Congressman, serving as a representative from Kentucky's 8th Congressional District from 1955 to 1963. Following the 8th district's elimination, he represented Kentucky's 5th Congressional District from 1963 to 1965. Previously, his father had also been elected to the Kentucky Court of Appeals and was the Republican nominee for governor in the 1951 Kentucky Gubernatorial election.

Siler received a Bachelor of Arts degree from Vanderbilt University in 1958, a Bachelor of Laws degree from the University of Virginia School of Law in 1963, and a Master of Laws degree from Georgetown University Law Center in 1964.

He joined the United States Navy as a Midshipman in 1957. The next year, he was commissioned as a lieutenant in the United States Naval Reserve, and saw active duty from 1958 to 1960. He would remain in the reserves until his retirement in 1983 at the rank of commander.

== Career ==
=== Whitley County ===
After graduating from Georgetown in 1964, Siler returned to Williamsburg and entered into a private law practice with his father. The next year, he received the Republican Party nomination for the office of Whitley County Attorney. He went on to win the general election and held the position until he was commissioned into federal service in 1970.

=== Federal judicial service ===
In 1969, Siler was nominated by President Richard Nixon as United States Attorney for the Eastern District of Kentucky. He was confirmed by the United States Senate on December 16, 1969. He received his commission the next year, and served until 1975.

Siler was nominated by President Gerald Ford on September 19, 1975, to a joint seat on the United States District Court for the Eastern District of Kentucky and the United States District Court for the Western District of Kentucky vacated by Judge Mac Swinford. He was confirmed by the United States Senate on November 11, 1975, and received his commission on November 13, 1975. He served as Chief Judge of the Eastern District from 1984 to 1991. Siler service was terminated on both courts on September 20, 1991, due to his elevation to the Sixth Circuit.

Siler was nominated by President George H. W. Bush on June 19, 1991, to a seat on the United States Court of Appeals for the Sixth Circuit vacated by Judge Harry Walker Wellford. He was confirmed by the United States Senate on September 12, 1991, and received his commission on September 16, 1991. In 1992, Siler was awarded Outstanding Judge of the Year by the American Bar Association. That same year, he was sent by the U.S. State Department to Lithuania in order to assist their government's judicial reforms. He would also be sent by the U. S. Justice Department to Albania as an advisor on ethics and discipline.

He assumed senior status on December 31, 2001.

In December 2024, a bill introduced by Senator Mitch McConnell and Representative Hal Rogers was passed by Congress to name the federal courthouse annex in London, Kentucky, in honor of Siler.

== See also ==
- List of United States federal judges by longevity of service

== Sources ==
Legal offices
Preceded by Mac Swinford	Judge of the United States District Court for the Eastern District of Kentucky; Judge of the United States District Court for the Western District of Kentucky; 1975–1991	Succeeded by Jennifer B. Coffman
Preceded by Bernard Thomas Moynahan Jr.	Chief Judge of the United States District Court for the Eastern District of Kentucky; 1984–1991	Succeeded by William Bertelsman
Preceded by Harry W. Wellford	Judge of the United States Court of Appeals for the Sixth Circuit; 1991–2001	Succeeded by John M. Rogers
