= Lozman v. City of Riviera Beach =

Fane Lozman and the city of Riviera Beach, Florida, have been parties to a number of lawsuits, two of which have been heard by the United States Supreme Court.

- In Lozman v. City of Riviera Beach, 568 U.S. 115 (2013), the Supreme Court ruled that a "vessel" is something that a reasonable observer would consider designed for transportation on water, and that Lozman's floating home was thus not a vessel.
- In Lozman v. City of Riviera Beach, 585 U.S. ___ (2018), the Supreme Court ruled that the existence of probable cause for a city police officer's arrest of Lozman did not bar him from bringing a retaliation claim under 42 U.S.C. § 1983.
