= Novak v. City of Parma =

2022 decision of the United States Court of Appeals for the Sixth Circuit

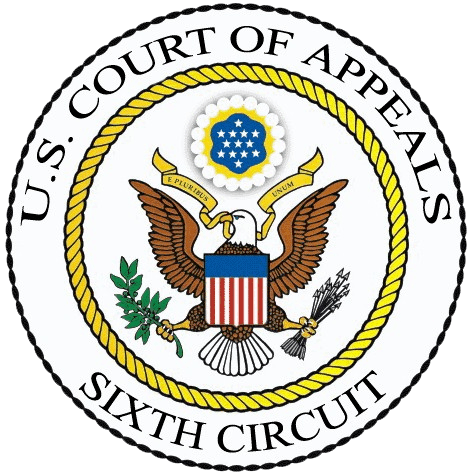
- Court: United States Court of Appeals for the Sixth Circuit
- Full case name: Anthony Novak v. City of Parma; Kevin Riley, Individually and in his Official Capacity as an Employee of the City of Parma, Ohio; Thomas Connor, Individually and as an Employee of the City of Parma, Ohio
- Decided: April 29, 2022
- Citation: 33 F.4th 296

Case history
- Prior actions: Novak acquitted of disrupting public services; Motion to dismiss denied on most claims; Sixth Circuit affirms denial; Northern District finds qualified immunity
- Appealed to: Supreme Court of the United States

Court membership
- Judges sitting: Jeffrey Sutton, Amul Thapar, Chad Readler

Case opinions
- The defendants have qualified immunity regarding their arrest of Anthony Novak for creating a Facebook page parodying the police department's.
- Decision by: Thapar

Novak v. City of Parma, 33 F.4th 296 (6th Cir. 2022), is a decision of the United States Court of Appeals for the Sixth Circuit granting qualified immunity to the city of Parma, Ohio, and its officials for prosecuting Anthony Novak over a Facebook page that parodied the Parma Police Department's page. The case drew widespread attention when The Onion, a satirical newspaper, filed a humorous but sincere amicus curiae brief supporting Novak's petition to the United States Supreme Court for certiorari; that petition was denied in February 2023.

The parody page, which strongly resembled the real page, had led to Novak's arrest in March 2016 and a subsequent trial for disrupting public services, which resulted in Novak's acquittal. Novak then brought suit under 42 U.S.C. § 1983 for retaliation and prior restraint. An initial decision of the Sixth Circuit in July 2019 allowed most of the suit to proceed, leading to a February 2021 ruling that Novak's arresting officers both had probable cause and were protected by qualified immunity, which the Sixth Circuit upheld in April 2022.

In August 2022, Novak petitioned the United States Supreme Court for certiorari, asking them to review the case. The Onion's amicus brief, submitted at the suggestion of Novak's counsel and drafted in consultation with the publication's writers, emphasized the importance of parody in political discourse, while also making absurd claims such as that The Onion "enjoys a daily readership of 4.3 trillion" and calling the federal judiciary "Latin dorks". The Babylon Bee, a conservative satirical publication, also supported Novak's petition in their own amicus brief, and commented favorably on The Onion's brief. The subsequent denial of certiorari let stand the Sixth Circuit's decision.

== Background ==
=== "We no crime" Facebook page ===
In March 2016, Parma, Ohio, resident Anthony Novak created a page on Facebook mimicking that of the Parma Police Department, except with their slogan of "We know crime" changed to "We no crime" in the "About" section. He did so anonymously from his phone while waiting for a bus, to express his criticism of the department's policies. Posts on the page included job postings that discouraged applications by members of minorities and an offer of "free abortions for teenagers provided by police in the Wal-Mart parking lot". Novak took the page down after about 12 hours, during which time 10 people reported it to the police via 9-1-1.

Novak deleted comments that called the page fake, and when the police department posted to the real page warning about his page, he made the same warning on his.

=== Novak's arrest and prosecution ===
Parma Police obtained Novak's information from Facebook and arrested him on March 25, 2016, a few weeks after the page's brief existence. They also searched his residence and seized his electronic devices. Novak was accused of disrupting public services, a fourth-degree felony; he spent three or four days in jail. He was indicted in April.

At trial in August 2016, prosecutors argued that Novak's actions had disrupted police activities. Novak's attorney, Gary Vick, countered that the department's statements at the time had focused on the derogatory nature of Novak's comments. The jury acquitted and Novak immediately announced plans to sue.

=== Section 1983 suit ===
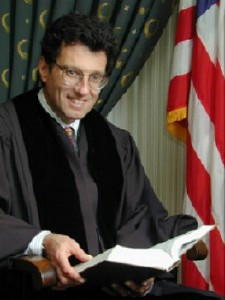
District Judge Dan Polster presided over the suit.

In October 2017, Novak brought a federal suit in the Northern District of Ohio against the City of Parma and two investigating officers under 42 U.S.C. § 1983, alleging retaliation and prior restraint in violation of the First Amendment and violations of the Fourth Amendment. The city moved to dismiss, asserting qualified immunity. District Judge Dan Polster denied most parts of the city's motion to dismiss in April 2018.

On appeal in July 2019, the Sixth Circuit dismissed Novak's claims "related to anonymous speech, censorship in a public forum, and the right to receive speech" but allowed the case to proceed otherwise. Judge Amul Thapar, writing for a unanimous three-judge panel, stressed "Our nation's long-held First Amendment protection for parody does not rise and fall with whether a few people are confused" and that parody is judged by "a reasonable reader standard, not a 'most gullible person on Facebook' standard." The court noted the United States Supreme Court's statement in Reichle v. Howards that "This Court has never recognized a First Amendment right to be free from a retaliatory arrest that is supported by probable cause" and the general rule under Nieves v. Bartlett that a plaintiff cannot sue for retaliatory arrest if probable cause existed. It found that Novak's speech did not fall under the exception made in Lozman v. City of Riviera Beach for "official policies of retaliation", and found that the exception made in Nieves (laws that are rarely enforced) could not be invoked because the Supreme Court's decision in Nieves postdated the arrest.

In February 2021, Polster found that the officers had probable cause to arrest Novak, that they had "followed the proper procedures" and not been "hot-headed police officers seeking revenge", and that they had qualified immunity.

== Opinion of the court ==
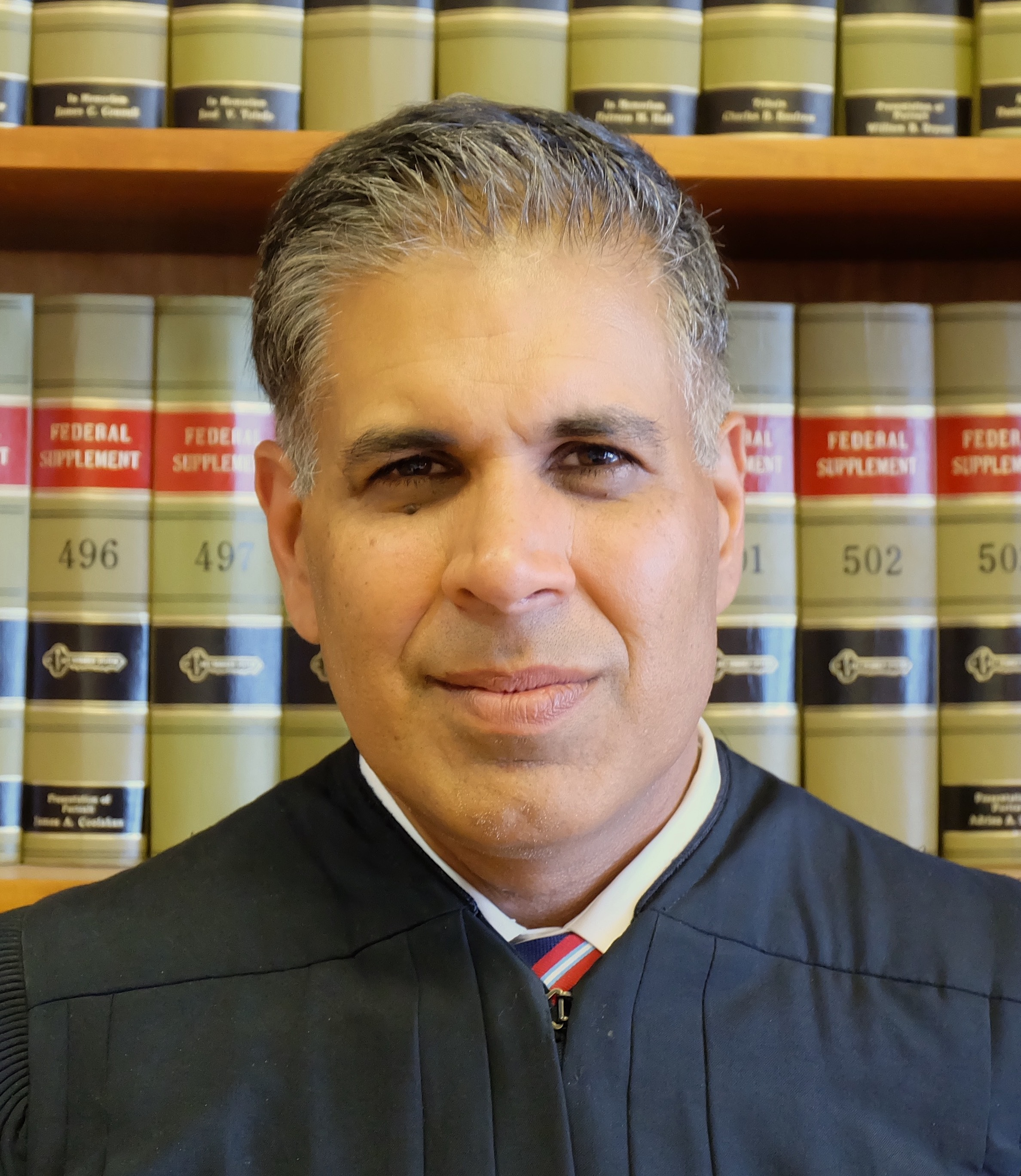
Circuit Judge Amul Thapar wrote the opinion of the panel.

A unanimous three-judge panel of the Sixth Circuit affirmed Polster's ruling in April 2022. Thapar, again writing for the panel, expressed the court's "doubts" about the decision to prosecute Novak, but agreed that the city and officers had qualified immunity. Unlike in the 2019 decision, in which the court had implied that probable cause could have come only from Novak's speech, Thapar wrote that it was reasonable for officers to think that Novak might have been impersonating a police officer, which unlike parody is not protected speech. Thus, he reasoned, there was probable cause for the arrest and it could not be retaliatory under Nieves.

The court also rejected Novak's Fourth Amendment, malicious prosecution, prior restraint, and municipal liability claims, and found that the officers had statutory immunity against "a jumble of state-law claims" because they did not act "with malicious purpose, in bad faith, or in a wanton or reckless manner."

== Certiorari petition ==
Novak filed a petition for a writ of certiorari from the United States Supreme Court on September 26, 2022, represented by attorneys from the Institute for Justice.

=== The Onion's amicus brief ===
In the weeks before submitting the certiorari petition, Patrick Jaicomo, counsel of record for Novak, contacted Jordan LaFlure, managing editor of prominent satirical newspaper The Onion, through a mutual friend and asked if LaFlure would help with the case. According to Jaicomo, The Onion management saw the ruling for Parma as a potential threat to their writers. On October 3, 2022, The Onion submitted an amicus curiae brief, its first ever. The New York Times described it as having been written by The Onion's lawyers with help from some of the publication's writers, while NPR reported that The Onion's head writer, Mike Gillis, wrote "most of the arguments and jokes", with the legal team supplying relevant precedent and context as part of "an extremely collaborative process".

The brief states The Onion's interest as amicus curiae in the form of a series of parodic statements, beginning:

The Onion is the world's leading news publication, offering highly acclaimed, universally revered coverage of breaking national, international, and local news events. Rising from its humble beginnings as a print newspaper in 1756, The Onion now enjoys a daily readership of 4.3 trillion and has grown into the single most powerful and influential organization in human history.

After further outlandish claims, the explanation of interest then points to times The Onion's parodies have been taken seriously and cites a story that it claims predicted Donald Trump's alleged mishandling of government documents at Mar-a-Lago. It then asserts "a self-serving interest in preventing political authorities from imprisoning humorists". The Onion later adds:

The Onion cannot stand idly by in the face of a ruling that threatens to disembowel a form of rhetoric that has existed for millennia, that is particularly potent in the realm of political debate, and that, purely incidentally, forms the basis of The Onion's writers' paychecks.

The brief argues against the proposition that parody must be labeled to avoid risking criminal consequences, often using humor to make that point. For instance, to illustrate the statement "It Should Be Obvious That Parodists Cannot Be Prosecuted For Telling A Joke With A Straight Face", the brief promises "a paragraph of gripping legal analysis" before devolving into an assortment of random law Latin phrases, having previously asserted that "the federal judiciary is staffed entirely by total Latin dorks". At another point, the brief characterizes the situation as absurd, saying "Much more of this, and the front page of The Onion would be indistinguishable from The New York Times."

The Onion defends Novak's comments as obvious parody under the "reasonable reader" standard established by prior jurisprudence, adding "True; not all humor is equally transcendent. But the quality and taste of the parody is irrelevant". The brief highlights the importance of parody in mocking authority and engaging in critique in general, referencing Jonathan Swift's A Modest Proposal (and then calling Swift a "hack").

=== Subsequent developments and denial of petition ===
The Babylon Bee, a conservative satirical publication, filed an amicus brief as well, beginning "Truth is stranger than fiction. And fiction is illegal. At least in the Sixth Circuit." It said that:

The Onion may be staffed by socialist wackos, but in their brief defending parody to this Court, they hit it out of the park. Parody has a unique capacity to speak truth to power and to cut its subjects down to size. Its continued protection under the First Amendment is crucial to preserving the right of citizens to effectively criticize the government.

The Bee listed a number of its own articles that could be said to violate the same statute Novak was charged under; referring to its ban from Twitter at the time as "a brutal life sentence in Twitter jail", it wrote that "[i]ts writers would very much like to avoid a consecutive sentence in a government-run facility". It also published, but did not file, an additional brief satirically siding with the police and their "badges and guns and stuff", saying that "when assessing whether particular speech is protected by the First Amendment, courts must also consider whether that speech hurts someone's feelings."

In a final round of briefing in January 2023, Novak's lawyers framed the case as an opportunity to either reconsider qualified immunity or better balance it with the right to free speech. The Supreme Court denied the petition on February 21, 2023, letting the lower courts' decisions stand. Novak expressed concerns for future implications for "others who poke fun at the powerful", while an attorney for Parma praised the outcome.

== Documentary ==
The case is the subject of the documentary Crime & Parody.
