= Lozman v. City of Riviera Beach (2018) =

2018 U.S. Supreme Court case

- Supreme Court of the United States

Argued February 27, 2017 Decided June 18, 2018
- Full case name: Fane Lozman v. City of Riviera Beach, Florida
- Docket no.: 17-21
- Citations: 585 U.S. 87 (more) 138 S.Ct. 1945; 201 L.Ed.2d 342
- Argument: Oral argument
- Opinion announcement: Opinion announcement

Case history
- Prior: Jury verdict for defendant, Lozman v. City of Riviera Beach, No. 9:08-cv-80134, 728 (S.D. Fla. Dec 17, 2014); affirmed, 681 F. App'x 746 (11th Cir. 2017); cert. granted, 138 S.Ct. 447 (2017).

Holding
- Existence of probable cause to arrest the plaintiff in the present case does not bar the plaintiff's First Amendment retaliation claim.

Court membership
- Chief Justice John Roberts Associate Justices Anthony Kennedy · Clarence Thomas; Ruth Bader Ginsburg · Stephen Breyer; Samuel Alito · Sonia Sotomayor; Elena Kagan · Neil Gorsuch

Case opinions
- Majority: Kennedy, joined by Roberts, Ginsburg, Breyer, Alito, Sotomayor, Kagan, Gorsuch
- Dissent: Thomas

Laws applied
- U.S. Const. amend. I, 42 U.S.C. § 1983

Lozman v. City of Riviera Beach, 585 U.S. 87 (2018), is a case in which the United States Supreme Court decided that the mere existence of probable cause for an arrest did not bar the plaintiff's First Amendment retaliatory arrest claim, but deferred consideration of the broader question of when it might. The case concerned a 42 U.S.C. § 1983 lawsuit filed against Riviera Beach by Fane Lozman, who had been arrested while criticizing local politicians during the public comments section of a City Council meeting. The city argued that under Hartman v. Moore he could not sue for retaliation, as they had probable cause to arrest him for the offense of disturbing a lawful assembly. Lozman conceded that they had probable cause, but argued that Hartman, a case about retaliatory prosecutions, did not extend to retaliatory arrests, and that instead Mt. Healthy City School District Board of Education v. Doyle allowed his suit.

At oral arguments, justices expressed both sympathy for Lozman and hesitance to issue a ruling that might hinder law enforcement. Their eventual ruling in Lozman's favor was very narrow, holding that the Mt. Healthy test was appropriate "on facts like these", based on the alleged "official municipal policy" of retaliation and the importance of the right to petition. A year later, the court considered the matter again in Nieves v. Bartlett, that time finding that probable cause generally bars a claim of retaliatory arrest.

Lozman had already won once at the Supreme Court against Riviera Beach, in the 2013 admiralty case Lozman v. City of Riviera Beach, 568 U.S. 115. The second case was noted for the very rare occurrence of two parties returning to the court over a dispute separate from the first. They settled after the case was remanded, with the city reimbursing Lozman for $874,999 in legal fees and paying a nominal $1 in damages.

== Background ==
=== Prior jurisprudence ===
In the 1977 case of Mt. Healthy City School District Board of Education v. Doyle, the Supreme Court established a standard of but-for causation for claims of official retaliation against speech. However, in the 2006 case of Hartman v. Moore, the Supreme Court established an exception for claims of retaliatory prosecution, requiring that a plaintiff show a lack of probable cause for their prosecution. Prior to Hartman there was already a circuit split as to whether the same principle applied to retaliatory arrests. Hartman further complicated the matter, with some circuits accepting the Hartman rule as controlling for retaliatory arrest suits and others accepting the Mt. Healthy rule.

The Supreme Court considered Hartman's applicability to retaliatory arrest first in Reichle v. Howards (2012), but decided the case on grounds of qualified immunity instead.

=== Lozman and Riviera Beach ===
Video of Lozman's arrest.

Fane Lozman sued the city of Riviera Beach, Florida, in June 2006 over a planned use of eminent domain, arguing that the city had violated open-meeting laws in approving a private development plan. The City Council then held a closed-door session, the transcript of which was later made public. Council members discussed strategies to silence Lozman, including sending a private investigator after him, which Chairperson Elizabeth Wade said she thought "would help to intimidate" him and make him "feel the same kind of unwarranted heat" that council members felt. In September 2006, the city sued in state court to evict Lozman from his floating home in the city marina. Lozman argued that this was retaliation for constitutionally protected speech, and the court ruled in his favor.

Lozman often spoke during the public comments portion of City Council meetings, often to criticize government corruption. At a meeting in November 2006, he began his remarks by noting the arrests of two officials of Palm Beach County, which Riviera Beach is a part of. Wade, the presiding council member, ordered him to stop talking about the matter. When he refused, she ordered a police officer to arrest him. The officer removed Lozman from the room in handcuffs.

At the police station, Lozman was charged with disorderly conduct and resisting arrest without violence. The state's attorney found that there was probable cause for the charges but dismissed them as there was "no reasonable likelihood of successful prosecution." The city later said that Lozman had been ordered to stop speaking because the topics he was discussing were unrelated to the city.

=== Proceedings in lower courts ===
Lozman, acting as his own attorney, then sued Riviera Beach under 42 U.S.C. § 1983, alleging several instances of deprivation of civil rights, including the arrest. Judge Daniel T. K. Hurley instructed the jury that, for Lozman to prevail on the claim of retaliatory arrest, he had to prove that the officer acted with impermissible animus toward his speech and that there was no probable cause for the arrest. Hurley allowed the city to argue that there had been probable cause to arrest Lozman for the offense of disturbing a lawful assembly, and instructed the jury to consider that question. The jury found for the city on every count of the complaint. Lozman appealed the judgment.

Regarding the jury instruction about probable cause, the Eleventh Circuit held that, even were they to accept Lozman's "compelling" argument that the jury instruction should have concerned animus by the city itself and not just by the arresting officer, the error was harmless, as "The jury's determination that the arrest was supported by probable cause defeats Lozman's First Amendment retaliatory arrest claim as a matter of law."

Lozman subsequently learned of the circuit split regarding probable cause in retaliatory arrest cases. Having already successfully taken the city to the Supreme Court in Lozman v. City of Riviera Beach, 568 U.S. 115 (2013), represented by Jeffrey L. Fisher of the Stanford Law School Supreme Court Litigation Clinic, Lozman again obtained representation from Fisher and the clinic, this time with Pamela S. Karlan as lead counsel. The Supreme Court granted certiorari in November 2017.

== At the Supreme Court ==
=== Oral arguments ===
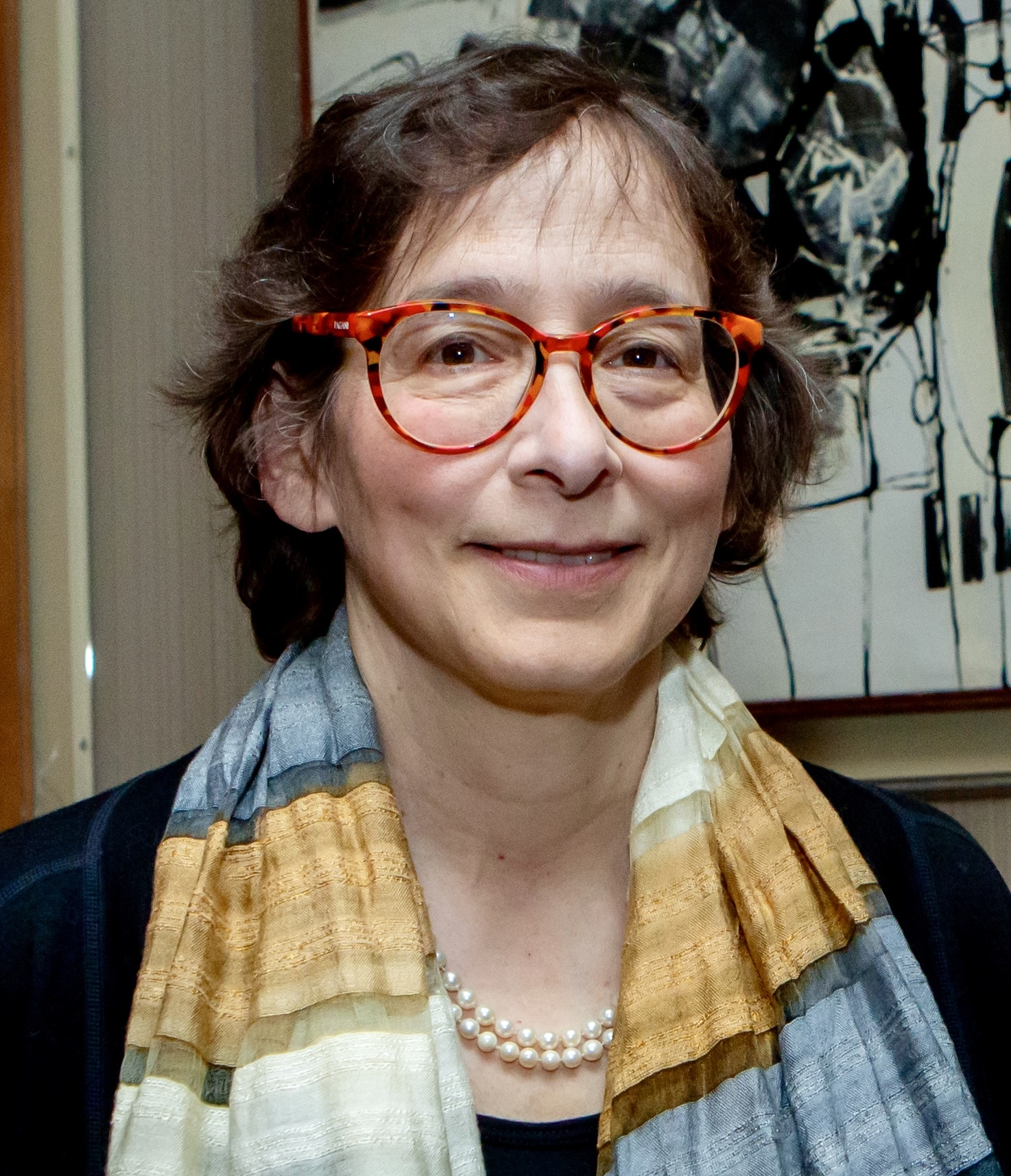
Pamela S. Karlan argued on behalf of Lozman.

Oral arguments were held on February 27, 2018, with Karlan representing Lozman and Shay Dvoretzky representing Riviera Beach. The office of the United States Solicitor General, which had sided with Lozman in the 2013 Supreme Court case, appeared as amicus curiae on the city's side, represented by Deputy Solicitor General Jeffrey Wall.

Karlan argued for applying the Mt. Healthy test to cases of retaliatory arrest like Lozman's. Rather than seriously question which way to rule, the justices were primarily concerned with how to rule in Lozman's favor without setting an unwanted precedent. The justices expressed significant concerns to Karlan about what that might mean for law enforcement, giving examples of criminals who insult the police. Justice Anthony Kennedy expressed a desire to "cordon off or box off what happened here from the ordinary conduct of police officers", while Roberts and Justice Stephen Breyer drew distinctions from environments like a city council meeting and those like a bar or "the streets". Karlan was questioned extensively on how to avoid setting a bad precedent, and was seen as struggling.

When it was Dvoretsky's turn to speak, Justice Elena Kagan interrupted to warn him that "Ms. Karlan was having some difficulty with hypotheticals. But you might have some difficulty with the facts of your case," which elicited laughter from the gallery. Dvoretsky argued for extending the Hartman test from retaliatory prosecutions to retaliatory arrests, or else risk deterring a police officer from making a valid arrest of, for example, someone wearing a Black Lives Matter t-shirt.

Speaking for the federal government, Wall argued that Lozman's case was "troubling" but that "the court, as in Hartman, should not make a general rule for the facts of this case." Chief Justice John Roberts replied:

I found the video pretty chilling.

I mean, the fellow is up there for about 15 seconds, and the next thing he knows, he's being led off in handcuffs, speaking in a very calm voice the whole time. Now the Council may not have liked what he was talking about, but that doesn't mean they get to cuff him and lead him out.

=== Opinion of the court ===
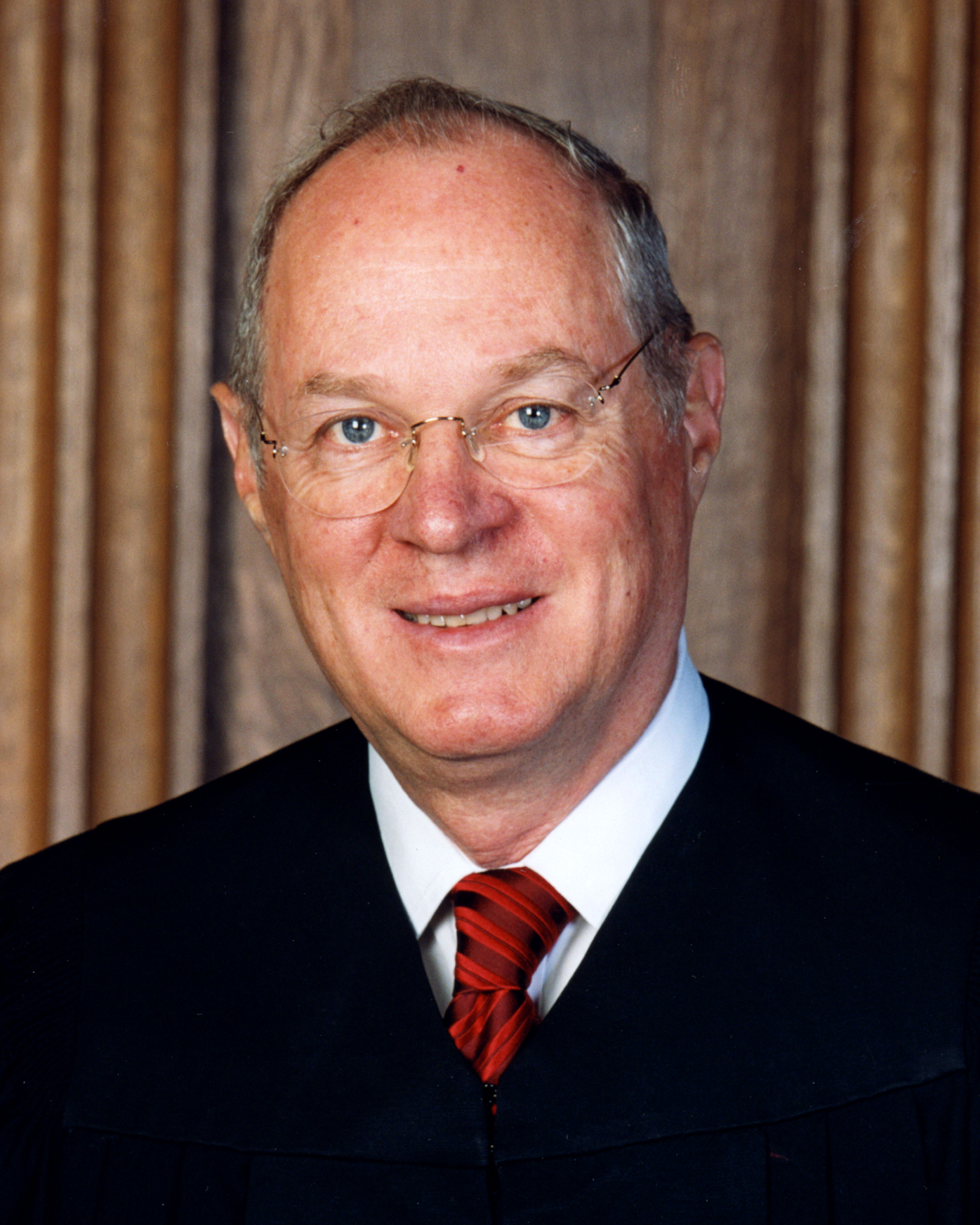
Justice Anthony M. Kennedy wrote the opinion of the court.

Justice Anthony M. Kennedy wrote for an eight-member majority. The majority held that the existence of probable cause did not categorically bar a claim of retaliatory arrest, but limited the decision's holding to Lozman's case and to others with "facts like these". The court observed the difficulty of proving causation in a case of alleged retaliatory arrest, as with retaliatory prosecution, but found there was no "presumption of regularity" with arrests as with prosecutions. While applying the Mt. Healthy standard to cases like Lozman's, the court declined to reach a decision as to which standard should apply in retaliatory arrest cases generally. It identified five factors that set Lozman's case apart from most others:

1. An allegation of an "official municipal policy" (assumed for the sake of argument to exist)
2. Objective evidence of such a policy in the form of the video of the arrest and the transcript of the preceding closed-door meeting
3. Evidence of retaliation occurring prior to the arrest as well
4. The lack of a close relationship between the speech Lozman was allegedly targeted for and the circumstances of his arrest
5. The high importance of the right to petition within First Amendment jurisprudence

In light of these, the court held that Lozman's case fell into a "unique class of retaliatory arrest claims," which "will require objective evidence of a policy motivated by retaliation to survive summary judgment." The court vacated the judgment below and remanded the case back to the Eleventh Circuit, but concluded by noting three arguments under which Lozman might be denied relief.

=== Thomas's dissent ===
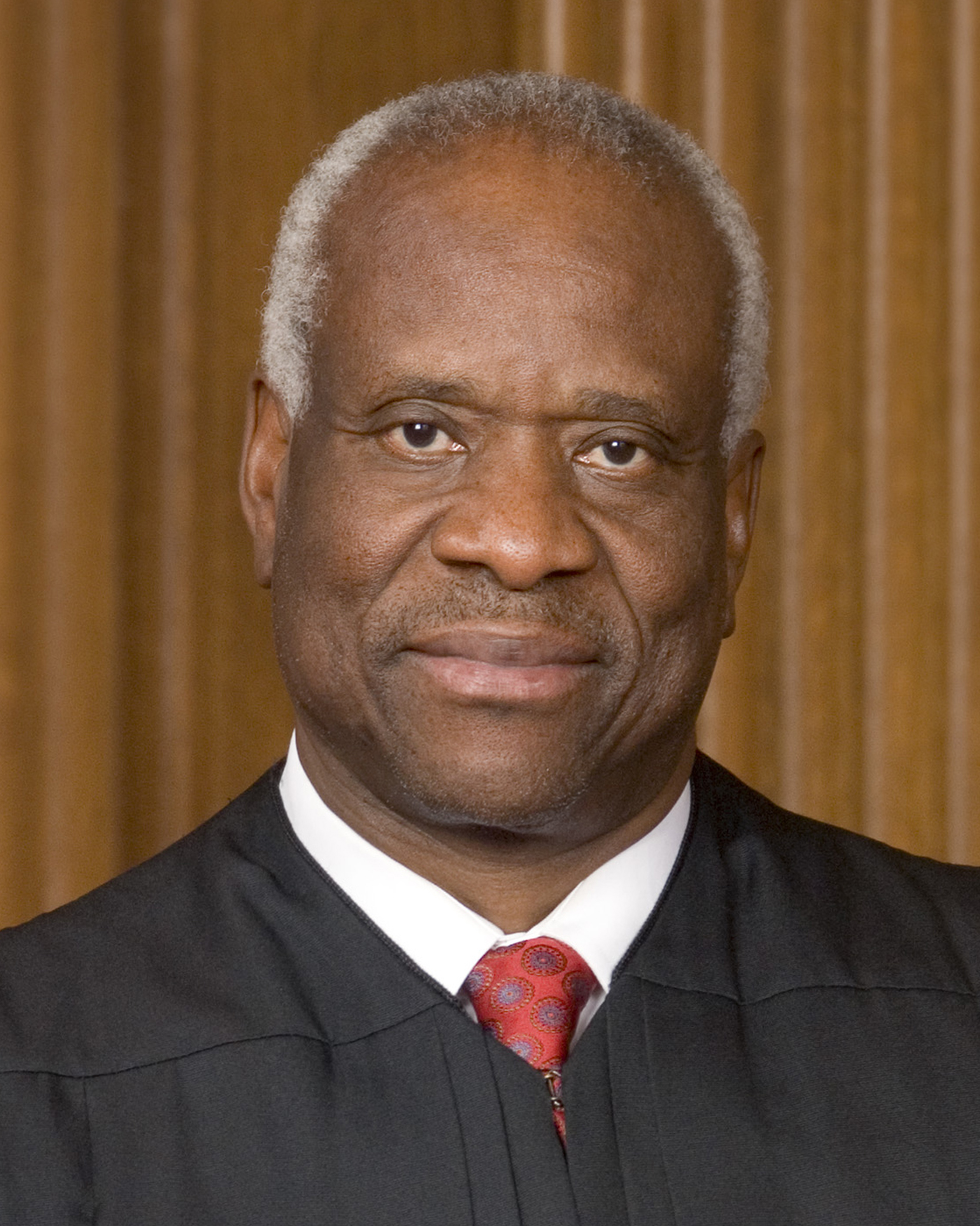
Justice Clarence Thomas wrote a solo dissent.

Justice Clarence Thomas, in a solo dissent, wrote that plaintiffs should categorically have to "plead and prove a lack of probable cause as an element of a First Amendment retaliatory-arrest claim". He criticized the majority for "leaving in place the decades-long disagreement among the federal courts". He advocated an approach based on common law rules that existed prior to the enactment of § 1983 in 1871, analogizing Lozman's claim to the common law torts of false imprisonment, malicious prosecution, and malicious arrest. He further argued that "the presence of probable cause will tend to disprove that the arrest was done out of retaliation for the plaintiff’s speech, and the absence of probable cause will tend to prove the opposite" and raised concerns about plaintiffs using the courts to harass police officers under the majority's holding, as "police officers almost always exchange words with suspects before arresting them". Thomas's dissent interprets the majority's opinion as requiring a plaintiff to prevail on all five factors identified as relevant; in the Charleston Law Review, Arielle W. Tolman and David M. Shapiro write that this interpretation "appears incorrect" and that the majority "nowhere implies that each factor is required."

== Impact and subsequent developments ==
The court's opinion in Lozman was unusual in that it was largely limited to Lozman's specific case, without setting a broader standard for anything beyond "facts like these". Heidi Kitrosser of SCOTUSblog compared its limited scope to the Onion headline "Supreme Court Issues Landmark 'It Depends' Ruling". Writing in The Atlantic, Garrett Epps characterized the "narrow, and perhaps temporary, win for Fane Lozman" as part of a trend of the Supreme Court "keeping its head down", referencing also its decisions that term in Gill v. Whitford and Benisek v. Lamone.

Lozman's narrow victory was noted for the extreme rarity of someone taking the same opponent to the Supreme Court in two different cases and winning both times. The case returned to the Eleventh Circuit, which in turn remanded it to the District Court to determine whether Lozman was entitled to a new trial, invoking the Supreme Court opinion's closing remarks. Lozman and the city subsequently settled for $875,000: $1 for the arrest, the rest to offset his legal fees.

In November 2018, the Supreme Court heard oral arguments in Nieves v. Bartlett, which again posed the question of whether a plaintiff in a retaliatory arrest suit must show a lack of probable cause. Lozman and the First Amendment Foundation filed a brief amicus curiae supporting Russell Bartlett, who alleged that his arrest by an Alaska state trooper had been retaliatory. In Nieves, the court decided that probable cause does generally defeat a claim of retaliatory arrest, citing Thomas's dissent in Lozman. The opinion referred to Lozman's circumstances as "unusual" and Nieves's case as more "representative". The Nieves decision nonetheless allowed that retaliatory arrest claims may be brought despite the presence of probable cause if the law in question was inconsistently enforced on the basis of protected speech.

Lozman's legacy, while nonzero, is limited. Viewed together, Lozman and Nieves have been taken to create two narrow exceptions to the application of the Hartman standard to retaliatory arrests. Writing before Nieves was decided, Tolman and Shapiro assess Lozman as "a victory—but not an unqualified one—for protesters who criticize the police and face a danger of retaliatory arrest", considering in particular protests by Black Lives Matter. Where retaliatory arrests occur as a result of "an individual officer's anger or vindictiveness" but probable cause did exist, Tolman and Shapiro see "an uncertain future"; but, in their analysis, Lozman leaves room for suits by protesters of law enforcement who are targeted by "official municipal policies" of retaliatory arrest. In the Cornell Law Review, Michael G. Mills highlights the case of Henneberry v. City of Newark, wherein the defendant did not attempt to argue that Lozman applied, even though he too had been arrested at the prompting of a city council member. Mills concludes that this is because "Lozman is incredibly fact-specific and therefore has little applicability".

== See also ==
- Novak v. City of Parma, No. 21-3290 (6th. Cir. 2022), considering and rejecting the applicability of Lozman to an arrest over a Facebook page parodying the police
