= Reichle v. Howards =

- Supreme Court of the United States

Decided June 4, 2012
- Full case name: Reichle v. Howards
- Citations: 566 U.S. 658 (more)
- Argument: Oral argument
- Opinion announcement: Opinion announcement

Holding
- Police officers are entitled to qualified immunity from civil suit for allegedly violating a constitutional right if, at the time of an arrest, it was not clearly established that an arrest supported by probable cause could give rise to the alleged rights violation.

Court membership
- Chief Justice John Roberts Associate Justices Antonin Scalia · Anthony Kennedy; Clarence Thomas · Ruth Bader Ginsburg; Stephen Breyer · Samuel Alito; Sonia Sotomayor · Elena Kagan

Case opinions
- Majority: Thomas, joined by Roberts, Scalia, Kennedy, Alito, Sotomayor
- Concurrence: Ginsburg (in judgment), joined by Breyer
- Kagan took no part in the consideration or decision of the case.

Reichle v. Howards, 566 U.S. 658 (2012), was a United States Supreme Court case in which the court held that police officers are entitled to qualified immunity from civil suit for allegedly violating a constitutional right if, at the time of an arrest, it was not clearly established that an arrest supported by probable cause could give rise to the alleged rights violation.

== Background ==
Agents Virgil D. "Gus" Reichle and Dan Doyle were members of a United States Secret Service detail protecting Vice President Richard Cheney while he greeted members of the public at a shopping mall. Doyle overheard Howards, who was speaking into his cell phone, state that he "was going to ask [the Vice President] how many kids he's killed today." Doyle and other agents observed Howards enter the line to meet Cheney, tell Cheney that his "policies in Iraq are disgusting," and touch Cheney's shoulder as Cheney was leaving. The agents then questioned Howards, however he insisted that he had not touched Cheney. They then arrested Howards, who was charged with harassment by local officials.

After that charge was dismissed, Howards brought an action against petitioners and others under Section 1983 and Bivens v. Six Unknown Fed. Narcotics Agents. Howards claimed that he was arrested and searched without probable cause, in violation of the Fourth Amendment, and that the arrest violated the First Amendment because it was made in retaliation for Howards' criticism of Cheney. The agents moved for summary judgment on the ground that they were entitled to qualified immunity, but the federal District Court denied the motion. On appeal, the Tenth Circuit Court of Appeals reversed the immunity ruling with respect to the Fourth Amendment claim because petitioners had probable cause to arrest Howards, but the court affirmed with regard to the First Amendment claim. In doing so, the court rejected Reichle's argument that, under Hartman v. Moore, probable cause to arrest defeats a First Amendment retaliatory arrest claim. It concluded instead that Hartman applied only to retaliatory prosecution claims and thus did not upset prior Tenth Circuit precedent holding that a retaliatory arrest violates the First Amendment even if supported by probable cause.

== Opinion of the court ==
Justice Clarence Thomas wrote the majority opinion for six justices.

Thomas identified two central issues: "whether a First Amendment retaliatory arrest claim may lie despite the presence of probable cause to support the arrest, and whether clearly established law at the time of Howards’ arrest so held," however only decided to address the second. Thomas argued that "qualified immunity shields governmental officials from civil damages liability unless the official violated a statutory or constitutional right that was clearly established at the time of the challenged conduct." This required that a reasonable official would understand that his or her behavior violates a right. However, Howards did not establish that threshold here because “this Court has never recognized a First Amendment right to be free from a retaliatory arrest that is supported by probable cause; nor was such a right otherwise clearly established at the time of Howard’s arrest.”

The Supreme Court issued an opinion on June 4, 2012. It unanimously ruled against Howards' claim that his free speech rights had been violated.

=== Concurrances ===
While the outcome—conferring immunity on the two agents—was unanimous, Justice Ruth Bader Ginsburg, joined by Justice Stephen G. Breyer, agreed only with the specific result. In that, Ginsburg wrote, if this case had not involved Secret Service agents, but only regular police officers, she would not have found a right to qualified immunity. Ginsburg concluded that the officers were "duty bound to take the content of Howards’ statements into account in determining whether he posed an immediate threat to the Vice President’s physical security."

Justice Elena Kagan took no part in the case.
