= James Randolph Hubbell =

American politician (1824–1890)

James R. Hubbell
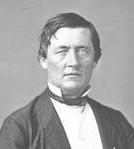

Member of the U.S. House of Representatives from Ohio's 8th district
- In office March 4, 1865 – March 3, 1867
- Preceded by: William Johnston
- Succeeded by: Cornelius S. Hamilton

Member of the Ohio House of Representatives from the Delaware County district
- In office December 3, 1849 – December 1, 1850 Serving with Elijah Carney
- Preceded by: David Gregory; Alvan Thompson
- Succeeded by: Wray Thomas; Joseph Keene
- In office January 4, 1858 – January 1, 1860
- Preceded by: William Hendren
- Succeeded by: Raymond Burr
- In office January 6, 1862 – March 2, 1865
- Preceded by: Raymond Burr
- Succeeded by: O. D. Hough

Speaker of the Ohio House
- In office January 6, 1862 – March 2, 1865
- Preceded by: Richard C. Parsons
- Succeeded by: Edwin A. Parrott

Member of the Ohio Senate from the 16th district
- In office January 3, 1870 – January 2, 1871
- Preceded by: Lewis Evans
- Succeeded by: Earley F. Poppleton

Personal details
- Born: James Randolph Hubbell; July 13, 1824 Delaware County, Ohio
- Died: November 26, 1890 (aged 66) Bellville, Ohio
- Resting place: Oak Grove Cemetery, Delaware, Ohio
- Party: Republican

James Randolph Hubbell (July 13, 1824 – November 26, 1890) was an American lawyer and politician from Ohio, serving one term as a Republican member of the U.S. House of Representatives from 1865 to 1867.

== Biography ==
He was born in Lincoln Township in Delaware County, Ohio. After teaching school, he practiced law in London and Delaware, Ohio.

=== Ohio legislature ===
Hubbell served in the Ohio state House of Representatives during the years 1849, 1858–59 and 1862–63. He was Speaker of that body in 1863.

=== Congress ===
At the close of the American Civil War, Hubbell was the U.S. representative from Ohio's 8th district from 1865 to 1867. Later, in 1869, he was a member of the Ohio state Senate.

=== Death and burial ===
Hubbell died in Bellville (Richland County), Ohio. He was buried at Oak Grove Cemetery in Delaware, Ohio.

== See also ==
- Edwin N. Hubbell (born 1815, date of death unknown), congressman from New York
- Jay Abel Hubbell (1829–1900), congressman from Michigan
- William S. Hubbell (1801–1873) congressman from New York

U.S. House of Representatives
Preceded by William Johnston	Member of the U.S. House of Representatives from Ohio's 8th congressional district 1865-1867	Succeeded by Cornelius S. Hamilton
