= Gonzalez v. Trevino =

- Supreme Court of the United States

Argued March 20, 2024 Decided June 20, 2024
- Full case name: Sylvia Gonzales v. Edward Trevino, II, et al.
- Docket no.: 22-1025
- Citations: 602 U.S. 653 (more)
- Argument: Oral argument
- Decision: Opinion

Case history
- Prior: Order denying motion to dismiss on qualified immunity. (W.D. Tex, 2021) Rev'd on appeal. Gonzalez v. Trevino, et al., 42 F.4th 487 (5th Cir. 2022) Reh'g en banc denied (5th Cir. 2023)

Questions presented
- 1. Whether the Nieves probable cause exception can be satisfied by objective evidence other than specific examples of arrests that never happened.; 2. Whether the Nieves probable cause rule is limited to individual claims against arresting officers for split-second arrests.

Holding
- Plaintiffs alleging retaliatory arrest need only provide evidence that their arrest occurred in circumstances where probable cause exists to arrest, but officers typically exercise discretion and decline to arrest.

Court membership
- Chief Justice John Roberts Associate Justices Clarence Thomas · Samuel Alito; Sonia Sotomayor · Elena Kagan; Neil Gorsuch · Brett Kavanaugh; Amy Coney Barrett · Ketanji Brown Jackson

Case opinions
- Per curiam
- Concurrence: Alito
- Concurrence: Kavanaugh
- Concurrence: Jackson, joined by Sotomayor
- Dissent: Thomas

Gonzalez v. Trevino, 602 U.S. 653 (2024), is a United States Supreme Court case in which the court held that plaintiffs alleging retaliatory arrest need only provide evidence that their arrest occurred in circumstances where probable cause exists to arrest, but officers typically exercise discretion and decline to arrest. This case is related to Nieves v. Bartlett.

== Background ==
=== Nieves v. Bartlett ===
Nieves v. Bartlett is a 2019 United States Supreme Court case. The case involved the issue of whether probable cause to arrest a suspect defeats a retaliatory arrest claim. In that case, Russell Bartlett sued Luis Nieves and his colleague, both Alaska State Troopers. Bartlett alleged that he had been retaliated against for his protected First Amendment speech by being arrested for disorderly conduct and resisting arrest. The arrest in question was based on probable cause. The court held that probable cause will "generally" defeat a claim of retaliatory arrest, except in cases where an officer would typically exercise discretion not to make an arrest, such as in cases of jaywalking. The Court explained:

[W]e conclude that the no-probable cause requirement should not apply when a plaintiff presents objective evidence that he was arrested when otherwise similarly situated individuals not engaged in the same sort of protected speech had not been.

— Chief Justice John Roberts, Nieves v. Bartlett, 587 U.S. 391, 407 (2019)

=== Factual Background ===
In May 2019, Sylvia Gonzalez—who had then recently been elected to the city council of Castle Hills, Texas—spoke at a city council meeting in favor of removing the city manager, a motion she led. Gonzalez had long been a critic of the local government. Near the end of the meeting and while gathering her papers, Gonzalez mistakenly gathered up the petition she had organized along with her belongings. Noticing this, Gonzalez removed the petition from her belongings soon after.

Months later, Gonzalez was arrested and charged with “destroy[ing], conceal[ing], remov[ing], or otherwise impair[ing] the verity, legibility, or availability of a governmental record.” Gonzalez was booked into the county jail, was made to wear inmate attire, and was handcuffed.

Gonzales sued various local officials, including mayor Edward Trevino, II, the chief of police, and a lawyer-turned-special detective for the police, for retaliatory arrest against her protected First Amendment speech, the culmination of an alleged months-long scheme to punish her for her petition to remove the city manager. In her complaint, Gonzalez accused the city officials of deliberately circumventing the district attorney's office in order to ensure that Gonzalez would be arrested and formally booked into jail rather than simply issued a summons. Upon learning of the charges, the district attorney's office immediately dismissed them. The complaint also documented the absence of arrests for conduct similar to Gonzalez's in the decade prior to her arrest. The complaint sought retrospective relief; at that time, Gonzalez's mugshot had already been widely disseminated, and she had been hounded out of office.

The defendants moved to dismiss the complaint on grounds of qualified immunity. This motion was denied by the district court. On appeal, the United States Court of Appeals for the Fifth Circuit reversed, holding that the Nieves probable cause exception could not be invoked unless Gonzalez could point to specific individuals who were not critics of the Castle Hills local government, and had not been arrested after mishandling a government petition.

== Supreme Court ==
On April 20, 2023, Gonzalez petitioned the Supreme Court to hear her case. On October 13, the Court granted certiorari. Oral arguments were heard on March 20, 2024. The case was argued by Anya Bidwell of the Institute for Justice representing Gonzalez; Lisa Blatt, representing Trevino, the police chief, and special detective; and Nicole Reaves of the U.S. Solicitor Generals' Office, who represented the United States as a friend of the Court, supporting neither party. It is one of relatively few Supreme Court cases to have been argued by an all-female group of advocates.

=== Per curiam opinion ===
In its brief opinion, the Court rejected the Fifth Circuit's "overly cramped" reading of Nieves. Clarifying the scope of the Nieves probable cause exception, the Court held that plaintiffs alleging retaliatory arrest need not produce "virtually identical and identifiable comparators". Rather, they need only provide evidence that their arrest occurred in circumstances where probable cause exists to arrest, but officers typically exercise discretion and decline to arrest. The Court clarified the breadth of evidence appropriate to overcome the probable cause exception, clarifying that "[t]he only express limit... on the sort of evidence a plaintiff may present... is that it must be objective[.]" Finding that Gonzalez provided this sort of evidence, the Court remanded to the lower courts for reconsideration in light of the now-clarified Nieves exception.
