= Samuel Shellabarger (Ohio politician) =

American politician

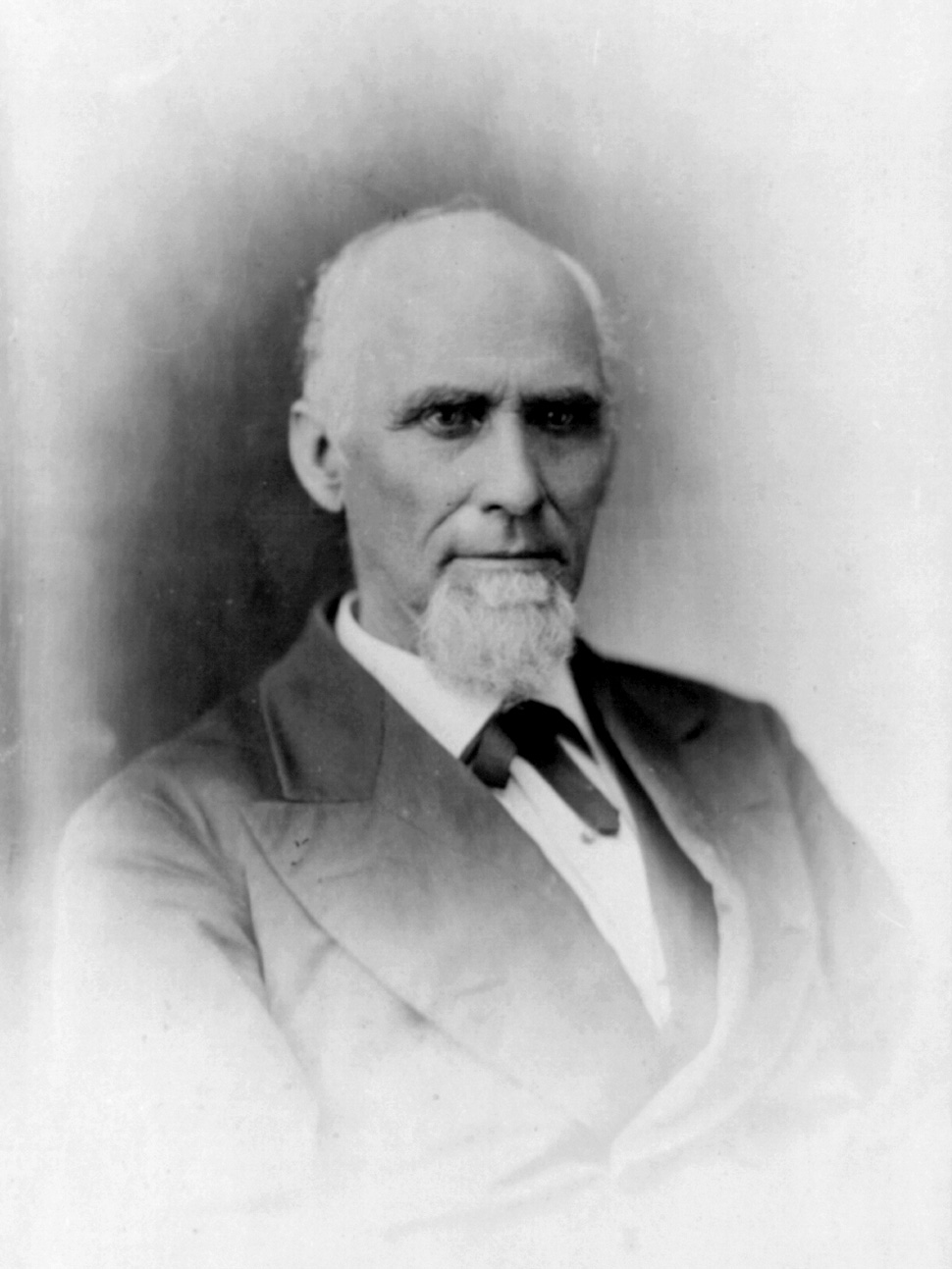

Member of the U.S. House of Representatives from Ohio
- In office March 4, 1861 – March 3, 1863
- Preceded by: Benjamin Stanton
- Succeeded by: William Johnston
- Constituency: 8th district
- In office March 4, 1865 – March 3, 1869
- Preceded by: Samuel S. Cox
- Succeeded by: James J. Winans
- Constituency: 7th district
- In office March 4, 1871 – March 3, 1873
- Preceded by: James J. Winans
- Succeeded by: Lawrence T. Neal
- Constituency: 7th district

Member of the Ohio House of Representatives from the Clark County district
- In office December 2, 1850 – January 1, 1854
- Preceded by: John T. Burnett; Henry W. Smith
- Succeeded by: William Goodfellow

United States Ambassador to Portugal
- In office April 21, 1869 – December 31, 1869
- Preceded by: James E. Harvey
- Succeeded by: William Cumback

Personal details
- Born: December 10, 1817 Enon, Ohio
- Died: August 6, 1896 (aged 78) Washington, D.C.
- Resting place: Ferncliff Cemetery, Springfield, Ohio
- Party: Republican
- Education: Miami University

Samuel Shellabarger (December 10, 1817 – August 6, 1896) was an American lawyer and politician who served three different stints as a Republican U.S. Representative from Ohio in the mid-19th century.

== Biography ==
Born near Enon, Ohio, Shellabarger attended the county schools and was graduated from Miami University, Oxford, Ohio, in 1841. He studied law and was admitted to the bar, commencing practice in Springfield, Ohio, in 1846. He served as a member of the State house of representatives in 1852 and 1853.

Shellabarger was elected as a Republican to the Thirty-seventh Congress (March 4, 1861 – March 3, 1863). He was an unsuccessful candidate for reelection in 1862 to the Thirty-eighth Congress. Shellabarger was elected to the Thirty-ninth and Fortieth Congresses (March 4, 1865 – March 3, 1869). He declined to be a candidate for renomination in 1868. He served as U.S. Minister to Portugal from April 21 to December 31, 1869.

Shellabarger was again elected to the Forty-second Congress (March 4, 1871 – March 3, 1873). During that term he served as chairman of the Committee on Commerce. Perhaps the most historically memorable moment of his life came early in this term when he drafted an anti-Ku Klux Klan bill—sometimes referred to as the Civil Rights Act of 1871. After passage by both houses of Congress, the bill was signed into law by President Ulysses S. Grant on April 20. This law was very instrumental in giving Grant the tools he needed to demolish the first-era KKK. Shellabarger's KKK bill was the second introduced in Congress that year; an earlier bill drafted by Benjamin Butler had failed to garner sufficient votes for passage.

Shellabarger was not a candidate for renomination in 1872. He served as a member of the United States Civil Service Commission in 1874 and 1875.

Shellabarger continued the practice of law until his death in Washington, D.C., August 6, 1896. He was interred in Ferncliff Cemetery, Springfield, Ohio.

He is the grandfather of Samuel Shellabarger (1888–1954), whom he raised after the death in 1889 of the grandson's parents. The younger Shellabarger later became an American educator and author of note.

== Source for initial material ==
- United States Congress. "Samuel Shellabarger (id: S000325)". Biographical Directory of the United States Congress.

U.S. House of Representatives
| Preceded by Benjamin Stanton | Member of the U.S. House of Representatives from Ohio's 8th congressional district 1861–1863 | Succeeded by William Johnston |
| Preceded by Samuel S. Cox | Member of the U.S. House of Representatives from Ohio's 7th congressional district 1865–1869 | Succeeded by James J. Winans |
| Preceded by James J. Winans | Member of the U.S. House of Representatives from Ohio's 7th congressional district 1871–1873 | Succeeded by Lawrence T. Neal |
