= James J. Winans =

American politician

James January Winans
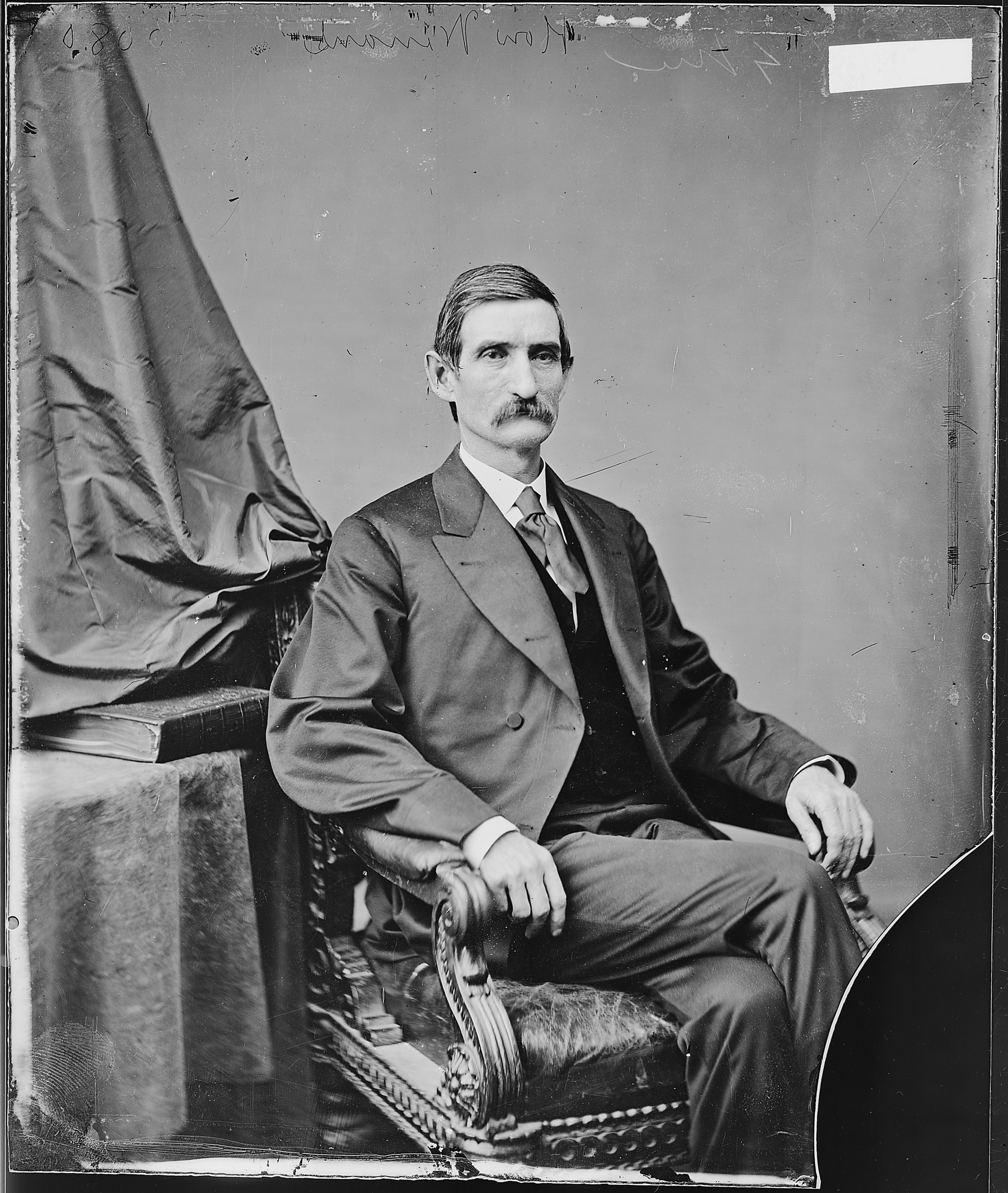

Member of the U.S. House of Representatives from Ohio's 7th district
- In office March 4, 1869 – March 3, 1871
- Preceded by: Samuel Shellabarger
- Succeeded by: Samuel Shellabarger

Member of the Ohio Senate from the 5th district
- In office January 4, 1858 – January 1, 1860
- Preceded by: Nelson Rush
- Succeeded by: John Quincy Smith

Personal details
- Born: June 7, 1818 Maysville, Kentucky, U.S.
- Died: April 28, 1879 (aged 60) Xenia, Ohio, U.S.
- Resting place: Woodlawn Cemetery, Xenia, Ohio
- Party: Republican
- Education: Transylvania University

James January Winans (June 7, 1818 – April 28, 1879) was an American lawyer and politician who served one term as a U.S. representative from Ohio from 1869 to 1871.

== Biography ==
Born in Maysville, Kentucky, Winans moved with his parents to Greene County, Ohio. He attended the common schools and Transylvania University of Lexington, Kentucky. He studied law. He was admitted to the bar in Lexington, Kentucky, in 1841 and commenced practice in Indiana. He moved to Xenia, Ohio, in 1843 and continued the practice of law. He served as clerk of the Greene County Courts 1845-1851. He served in the State senate in 1857. He served as judge of the court of common pleas 1864-1871.

Winans was elected as a Republican to the Forty-first Congress (March 4, 1869 – March 3, 1871). He was an unsuccessful candidate for reelection in 1870 to the Forty-second Congress. He resumed the practice of law. He died in Xenia, Ohio, April 28, 1879. He was interred in Woodlawn Cemetery.

== Sources ==
- United States Congress. "James J. Winans (id: W000626)". Biographical Directory of the United States Congress.

U.S. House of Representatives
Preceded by Samuel Shellabarger	Member of the U.S. House of Representatives from Ohio's 7th congressional district 1869-1871	Succeeded by Samuel Shellabarger
