= Lozman v. City of Riviera Beach (2013) =

2013 United States Supreme Court case

Fane Lozman v. City of Riviera Beach
- Supreme Court of the United States

Argued October 1, 2012 Decided January 15, 2013
- Full case name: Fane Lozman v. The City of Riviera Beach, Florida
- Docket no.: 11-626
- Citations: 568 U.S. 115 (more)
- Argument: Oral argument
- Opinion announcement: Opinion announcement

Case history
- Prior: City of Riviera Beach v. That Certain Unnamed Gray, Two-Story Vessel Approximately Fifty-Seven Feet in Length, 649 F.3d 1259 (2011)

Holding
- A vessel is something that a reasonable observer would consider designed for transportation on water. Lozman's floating home was not a vessel.

Court membership
- Chief Justice John Roberts Associate Justices Antonin Scalia · Anthony Kennedy; Clarence Thomas · Ruth Bader Ginsburg; Stephen Breyer · Samuel Alito; Sonia Sotomayor · Elena Kagan

Case opinions
- Majority: Breyer, joined by Roberts, Scalia, Thomas, Ginsburg, Alito, Kagan
- Dissent: Sotomayor, joined by Kennedy

Laws applied
- Rules of Construction Act

Lozman v. City of Riviera Beach, 568 U.S. 115 (2013), is a United States Supreme Court case in which the Court held that a vessel in admiralty law is something that a reasonable observer would consider designed for water transportation. The case arose from an in rem suit brought under admiralty jurisdiction by the city of Riviera Beach, Florida, against a floating home owned by resident Fane Lozman. Lozman argued that the floating home, which had no means by which to propel itself, was not a vessel under the Rules of Construction Act and thus not subject to admiralty jurisdiction. The Court resolved a circuit split as to what it means for a vessel to be "capable" of transportation by creating the reasonable observer standard, ruling in Lozman's favor.

The case was noted for the amusing factual question presented, which caused Chief Justice John Roberts to describe it as his favorite case of the term, and for the context of the dispute between Lozman and Riviera Beach: The two parties were involved in a number of related legal disputes, and Lozman proceeded pro se for part of the litigation. Lozman and the city returned to the Supreme Court in 2018 regarding Lozman's arrest at a city council meeting; the court held for Lozman that time as well.

== Background ==
=== Prior jurisprudence ===
Title 1, Chapter 1 of the United States Code (also known as the Rules of Construction Act or Dictionary Act) states:

The word "vessel" includes every description of watercraft or other artificial contrivance used, or capable of being used, as a means of transportation on water.

In Stewart v. Dutra Construction Co. in 2005, the United States Supreme Court interpreted this to encompass "any watercraft practically capable of maritime transportation, regardless of its primary purpose or state of transit at a particular moment", but did not address whether a structure's intended use had a bearing on whether it should be considered a vessel. In De La Rosa v. St. Charles Gaming Co., the Fifth Circuit Court of Appeals interpreted Stewart as allowing such considerations, and ruled that a floating casino was not a vessel since its owners had no intention to use it for transportation, while in Bd. of Comm'rs of the Orleans Levee Dist. v. M/V Belle of Orleans the Eleventh Circuit held the opposite: "The owner's intentions with regard to a boat are analogous to the boat's 'purpose,' and Stewart clearly rejected any definition of 'vessel' that relies on such a purpose."

=== That Certain Unnamed Gray, Two-Story Vessel Approximately Fifty-Seven Feet in Length ===
After activist Fane Lozman successfully sued to prevent the city from using eminent domain to seize properties along the waterfront, the city brought an in rem suit against Lozman's floating home under federal admiralty law, seeking a maritime lien for dockage fees and damages for trespass. Lozman responded pro se to the suit, City of Riviera Beach v. That Certain Unnamed Gray, Two-Story Vessel Approximately Fifty-Seven Feet in Length. He argued that his floating home, which had no way to propel itself, was not a "vessel" under the Rules of Construction Act, and that the District Court for the Southern District of Florida thus lacked admiralty jurisdiction. The district court rejected this argument and found that Lozman owed the city $3,000 under the lien. The Eleventh Circuit upheld the decision, citing past precedent that "the status of 'vessel' does not depend in any way on either the purpose for which the craft was constructed or its intended use." The district court ordered Lozman to sell the floating home. The city bought it at auction and destroyed it.

=== Petition for certiorari ===
The Eleventh Circuit's opinion in That Certain Unnamed Gray, Two-Story Vessel Approximately Fifty-Seven Feet in Length (and Belle of Orleans before it) created a circuit split with the Fifth Circuit's holding in De La Rosa as to whether a structure's purpose matters for determining whether it is a vessel.

Lozman chose not to continue pro se, and instead sought as counsel Jeffrey L. Fisher of the Stanford Law School Supreme Court Litigation Clinic after googling "appellate lawyers". Fisher works primarily in criminal law, but had experience with maritime cases such as Exxon Shipping Co. v. Baker. Fisher filed a petition for a writ of certiorari, which the Supreme Court granted in February 2012.

== At the Supreme Court ==
=== Oral arguments ===
Oral arguments were held on 1 October 2012. Fisher advocated a standard that focuses on a vessel's purpose. He highlighted Lozman's home's unsuitability to transport people or goods, noting its "French doors on three sides a few feet above the water line" and lack of independent source of power or movement. Justice Samuel Alito objected to Fisher's distinction between "purpose" and "function" on the basis that the statute "says nothing about purpose".

Curtis E. Gannon, Assistant to the Solicitor General, argued on behalf of the United States that the justices should look to whether an indefinitely moored structure had ever been a vessel.

David C. Frederick, representing Riviera Beach, argued for a simple definition based on a "practical capability to float, move and carry goods or people". Several justices responded with examples of objects that might meet this definition but would not typically be considered vessels, such as an inner tube (Chief Justice John Roberts) or a styrofoam sofa (Justice Stephen Breyer).

Justice Anthony Kennedy at one point referred to the floating home as a "magnificent structure ... which was mercifully destroyed", which drew laughter from the crowd. Lozman later said that he had come close to walking out of the courtroom over the remark.

=== Opinion of the court ===
In a 7–2 decision written by Justice Breyer, the court ruled on 15 January 2013 in favor of a reasonable observer test for determining whether a structure is "capable of being used as a means of transportation on water" and is thus a vessel:

Not every floating structure is a "vessel." To state the obvious, a wooden washtub, a plastic dishpan, a swimming platform on pontoons, a large fishing net, a door taken off its hinges, or Pinocchio (when inside the whale) are not "vessels," even if they are "artificial contrivance[s]" capable of floating, moving under tow, and incidentally carrying even a fair-sized item or two when they do so. ... Consequently, in our view a structure does not fall within the scope of this statutory phrase unless a reasonable observer, looking to the home’s physical characteristics and activities, would consider it designed to a practical degree for carrying people or things over water.

The court then considered Lozman's floating home under that standard. Breyer emphasized that "But for the fact that it floats, nothing about Lozman's home suggests that it was designed to any practical degree to transport persons or things over water", and highlighted several attributes which made it ill-suited for those tasks, such as having no steering mechanism. On that basis, the court found that it was not a vessel and reversed the Eleventh Circuit. The opinion drew a distinction between floating homes like Lozman's and houseboats that are capable of propelling themselves.

=== Sotomayor's dissent ===
Justice Sonia Sotomayor dissented, joined by Justice Kennedy. She began by noting that she "agree[d] with much of the Court's reasoning" and characterizing the Eleventh Circuit's test as "overinclusive". However, she criticized the introduction of a reasonable observer test as going against maritime industries' need for "clear and predictable legal rules for determining which ships are vessels." She further felt that the record was not clear enough to conclude that Lozman's home was not a vessel, and argued that the matter should have been instead remanded to the Eleventh Circuit for further consideration.

== Impact and subsequent developments ==
The decision in Lozman was taken as definitive with respect to whether floating homes—as distinct from houseboats capable of self-propulsion—are vessels under admiralty law, but less so in other regards. David R. Maass, writing in the Florida Law Review, criticized the reasonable observer test as making matters uncertain for lower courts; Kathryn D. Yankowski, writing in the University of Miami Law Review, acknowledged this as "potentially problematic" but saw Lozman as a "fundamental addition" to maritime law that clarified the test lower courts should use.

Chief Justice Roberts referred to the case as his favorite of the 2012 term, and emphasized the impact of seeing a picture of the floating home, which he described as looking like "a house that got swept into the ocean somehow".

After winning at the Supreme Court, Lozman sought $270,000 in damages from the city for the loss of his floating home. A federal judge instead ordered that the city pay $7,500. The Eleventh Circuit upheld the ruling on appeal, and the Supreme Court denied a mandamus petition in April 2017.

Lozman's litigation against Riviera Beach regarding his floating home occurred parallel to suit alleging that his 2006 arrest at a city council meeting had been retaliatory. That case, also called Lozman v. City of Riviera Beach, reached the Supreme Court in 2018. The Supreme Court again held in Lozman's favor, allowing the suit to proceed.
