= Cornelius S. Hamilton =

American politician (1821–1867)

Cornelius Hamilton
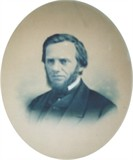

Member of the U.S. House of Representatives from Ohio's 8th district
- In office March 4, 1867 – December 22, 1867
- Preceded by: James Hubbell
- Succeeded by: John Beatty

Member of the Ohio Senate from the 13th district
- In office January 7, 1856 – January 3, 1858
- Preceded by: William Lawrence
- Succeeded by: C. H. Gatch

Personal details
- Born: Cornelius Springer Hamilton; January 2, 1821 Gratiot, Ohio, U.S.
- Died: December 22, 1867 (aged 46) Marysville, Ohio, U.S.
- Resting place: Oakdale Cemetery in Marysville
- Party: Republican
- Education: Denison University

Cornelius Springer Hamilton (January 2, 1821 – December 22, 1867) was a lawyer and politician who was a U.S. representative from Ohio, serving from March 4, 1867 until his death in December of that same year.

== Early life and education ==
Born in Gratiot, Ohio, Hamilton attended the common schools and Denison University. He moved with his parents to Union County in 1839, where he engaged in agricultural pursuits with his father. He studied law, and was admitted to the bar in 1845, commencing practice in Marysville, Ohio.

== Career ==
He acted as a land appraiser and assessor in 1845, after which he served as delegate to the State constitutional convention from 1850 to 1851. He was editor and proprietor of the Marysville Tribune from 1850 to 1853. He then served as member of the State senate in 1856 and 1857, and was appointed by President Lincoln assessor of the eighth congressional district of Ohio in 1862 and served until 1866.

=== Congress ===
Hamilton was elected as a Republican to the Fortieth Congress and served from March 4, 1867, until his death, December 22, 1867.

== Death ==
Hamilton was beaten to death by his apparently deranged son, Thomas, with a board while the two fed livestock at the family farm in Marysville. Thomas Hamilton then pursued his mother, younger brother John, and members of the local community with an axe, injuring but not killing anyone else.

He was interred in Oakdale Cemetery in Marysville.

== See also ==
- List of assassinated American politicians
- List of members of the United States Congress who died in office (1790–1899)
- List of members of the United States Congress killed or wounded in office

== Sources ==
- United States Congress. "Cornelius S. Hamilton (id: H000106)". Biographical Directory of the United States Congress.

U.S. House of Representatives
Preceded by James Hubbell	Member of the U.S. House of Representatives from Ohio's 8th congressional district 1867	Succeeded by John Beatty
