= William Johnston (Ohio politician) =

American politician

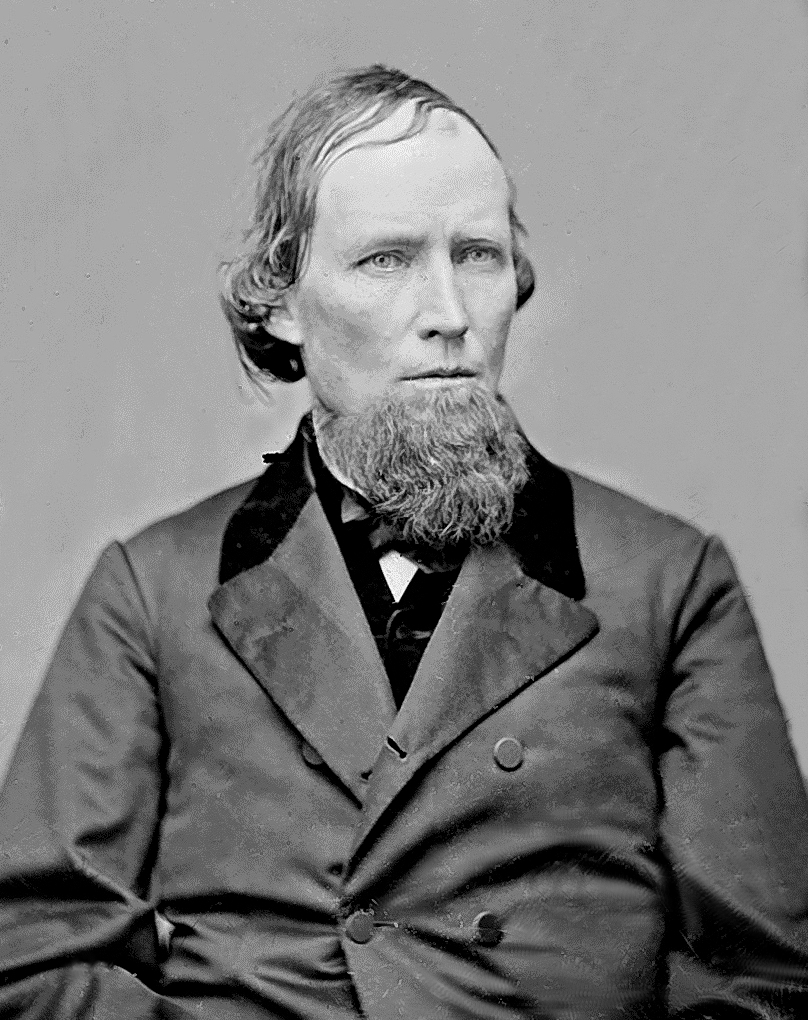

Member of the U.S. House of Representatives from Ohio's 8th district
- In office March 4, 1863 – March 3, 1865
- Preceded by: Samuel Shellabarger
- Succeeded by: James Randolph Hubbell

Personal details
- Born: 1819 Ireland, U.K.
- Died: May 1, 1866 (aged 46–47) Mansfield, Ohio, U.S.
- Resting place: Mansfield Cemetery
- Party: Democratic

William Johnston (1819 – May 1, 1866) was an American lawyer and politician who served one term as a U.S. representative from Ohio from 1863 to 1865.

== Biography ==
Born on the island of Ireland (the entirety of which was then part of the U.K.) in 1819, Johnston immigrated to the United States and settled in Ohio. He attended the public schools. He studied law. He was admitted to the bar and practiced in Mansfield, Ohio, from 1859 to 1863.

=== Congress ===
Johnston was elected as a Democrat to the Thirty-eighth Congress (March 4, 1863 – March 3, 1865). He was an unsuccessful candidate for reelection in 1864 to the Thirty-ninth Congress.

He resumed the practice of law.

=== Death ===
He died in Mansfield, Ohio, May 1, 1866. He was interred in Mansfield Cemetery.

== Sources ==
- United States Congress. "William Johnston (id: J000201)". Biographical Directory of the United States Congress.

U.S. House of Representatives
Preceded by Samuel Shellabargar	Member of the U.S. House of Representatives from Ohio's 8th congressional district 1863-1865	Succeeded by James R. Hubbell
