= Retaliatory arrest and prosecution =

Arrest or prosecution done to punish the exercising of civil rights

A retaliatory arrest or retaliatory prosecution occurs when law enforcement or prosecutorial actions are initiated in response to an individual’s exercise of their civil rights, such as freedom of speech or assembly. These actions are considered forms of misconduct, as they aim to punish individuals for engaging in constitutionally-protected activities.

== Canada ==
The Canadian Charter of Rights and Freedoms guarantees fundamental freedoms, including freedom of expression, peaceful assembly, and association. Arrests or prosecutions that retaliate against individuals for exercising these rights contravene the Charter. Victims can seek remedies through the courts, which may include stays of proceedings or damages.

=== Fleming v. Ontario ===
In Fleming v. Ontario (2019), the Supreme Court of Canada addressed the issue of preventive arrests in the context of lawful conduct. Randy Fleming was arrested while peacefully walking to a counter-protest, carrying a Canadian flag. The police arrested him to prevent a potential breach of the peace by others. The Court held that the police did not have the authority to arrest someone engaging in lawful conduct to prevent a breach of peace by others, emphasizing the importance of individual liberty and the necessity of justifiable police conduct.

=== Abuse of process doctrine ===
Canadian courts recognize the abuse of process doctrine, which addresses prosecutorial misconduct, including retaliatory prosecutions. If law enforcement actions are deemed abusive or conducted in bad faith, courts can stay proceedings to prevent misuse of the judicial process.

== United States ==
Fane Lozman's arrest at a Riviera Beach City Council meeting in 2006

In the United States, the First Amendment protects individuals from government retaliation for exercising free speech. However, establishing a claim of retaliatory arrest or prosecution requires demonstrating a causal link between the protected activity and the adverse governmental action. The presence of probable cause for the arrest or prosecution often complicates such claims.

=== Notable cases ===
- Hartman v. Moore (2006): The U.S. Supreme Court held that plaintiffs alleging retaliatory prosecution must show the absence of probable cause for the underlying charges.
- Lozman v. City of Riviera Beach (2018): Fane Lozman was arrested at a city council meeting after speaking during the public-comment period. He alleged the arrest was in retaliation for his outspoken criticism of city officials. The city argued that the logic of Hartman extended to retaliatory arrest. The Supreme Court, however, allowed his claim to proceed, emphasizing that retaliatory intent could be inferred if the arrest was part of an official policy of retaliation.
- Nieves v. Bartlett (2019): The Supreme Court held that the existence of probable cause generally defeats a First Amendment retaliatory arrest claim under 42 U.S.C. § 1983. However, the Court recognized an exception: if a plaintiff presents objective evidence that others similarly situated, who were not engaged in protected speech, were not arrested, the claim may proceed despite probable cause.
- Gonzalez v. Trevino (2024): Sylvia Gonzalez, a city councilwoman, was arrested after organizing a petition critical of a city official. She claimed the arrest was retaliatory. The Supreme Court ruled that even with probable cause, a retaliatory arrest claim could proceed if there is evidence of differential treatment compared to others similarly situated who were not arrested.

== See also ==
- Contempt of cop
- Arbitrary arrest and detention
- 42 U.S.C. § 1983, governing claims against state actors for denial of constitutional rights
- Bivens v. Six Unknown Named Agents, governing claims against federal actors
- Prosecutorial vindictiveness
