= Fane Lozman =

American inventor, futures and options trader, and anti-corruption activist

Fane Lozman is an American inventor and futures and options trader known for his long-running legal battles with the city of Riviera Beach, Florida. His litigation against the city has reached the U.S. Supreme Court twice: a 2013 case about whether a floating home is a vessel and a 2018 case about retaliatory arrest for protected speech. The court ruled in his favor in both cases.

Prior to moving to Riviera Beach, Lozman lived in North Bay Village, Florida, where his investigative efforts resulted in the arrests of corrupt government officials. For his activism in Riviera Beach and North Bay Village, Lozman has been described as a "persistent gadfly" and a "relentless opponent of public corruption".

== Early life, education, and career ==
Born in Miami, Florida, Lozman received a B.A. in mathematics from the University of Miami. He then joined the United States Marine Corps, where he served a tour of duty as a Marine attack pilot.

After returning to civilian life, Lozman moved to Chicago and invented a new market trading screen interface, which he named Scanshift. The interface was "modeled on the cockpit displays of the planes he used to fly", along with the technology that is used to land fighter planes on aircraft carriers. Scanshift employs a visually ergonomic layout incorporating a hub and spoke display that uses "a variety of rectangles, lines, and arrows to indicate which kinds of securities were moving and what that movement signaled".

Lozman filed a patent application for his Scanshift interface in 1994, and the patent was issued on November 18, 1997. Lozman formed a small brokerage firm called Terra Nova, that became the foundation for the Terra Nova ECN, later renamed Archipelago ECN. Several years of futures trading and options trading made Lozman a millionaire.

As of 2016, Lozman had become involved in real estate development with an overwater stilt home community called Renegade on a 25 acres (10 ha) parcel of submerged lands. This property, with 1,025 feet (312 m) of private beach, was located on the northwest side of Singer Island, Florida, adjacent to the intracoastal waterway.

== Legal battles ==
=== North Bay Village ===
In 2002, Lozman moved back to South Florida to escape the Chicago winters. He purchased a 60 by 12 ft (18.3 by 3.7 m) two-story floating home and had it towed from Fort Myers, Florida to North Bay Village, Florida, in northern Miami-Dade County. After mooring his residence in a North Bay Village marina, Lozman became embroiled in a dispute with the marina landlord over a proposed wheelchair ramp for a disabled World War II veteran, for which Lozman offered to pay. The landlord evicted Lozman, who then began researching the landlord's business activities, discovering an illegal connection to a Village elected official. While calling out this corrupt behavior, Lozman was ejected from public meetings on several occasions, and was arrested on two occasions for publicly accusing officials of corruption. The state attorney declined prosecution in both instances. Lozman's efforts ultimately led to the arrest of the mayor and three city commissioners and their subsequent removal from office.

=== Riviera Beach ===
Lozman remained in North Bay Village until the 2005 Atlantic hurricane season, when the marina where his floating home was moored was destroyed by Hurricane Wilma. Lozman then had his home towed about 70 miles (110 km) north to the City of Riviera Beach.

==== Sunshine Lawsuit and attempted eviction ====
The day Lozman arrived at the City marina with his floating home, Lozman learned that the City planned to redevelop its waterfront, by using the power of eminent domain. The City intended to take 2,200 homes and adjacent businesses, along with the City marina, for a $2.4 billion redevelopment plan, and then transfer these properties to a private developer. Lozman became an outspoken critic of the plan, accusing the Council members of corruption in public meetings. Before the City could finalize its agreement with the developers, the Florida Legislature passed a bill prohibiting the use of eminent domain for private purposes. But the day before the Governor signed the bill into law, the City convened a meeting to approve its agreement with the developer. In response, Lozman filed a lawsuit alleging that the agreement was invalid as violative of Florida's Sunshine Law. After Lozman filed his lawsuit, members of the City Council came under investigation by the Florida Department of Law Enforcement.

On June 28, 2006, the City Council held a closed-door meeting to discuss the lawsuit Lozman had recently filed. The Council members were in agreement that Lozman should be "intimidated" and made to feel "unwarranted heat". The City undertook a series of actions against Lozman, which began with legal actions to evict Lozman and his floating home from the City marina. During the eviction trial, the City argued that Lozman's ten pound dachshund, "Lady", might bite someone. After a three-day jury trial, with Lozman proceeding pro se, the jury ruled in Lozman's favor, finding that the eviction was unlawful retaliation for Lozman's exercise of his right to free speech.

==== Floating home dispute and first U.S. Supreme Court case ====
After failing to evict Lozman from the Riviera Beach marina under state landlord-tenant law, the city asked Lozman to sign an agreement requiring that his floating home be able to be moved in an emergency. When he refused, the city brought a lawsuit under federal admiralty law against Lozman's floating home in 2009. Lozman, acting pro se, asked the federal district court to dismiss the suit on the ground that the court lacked admiralty jurisdiction. The court improperly found that the floating home was a "vessel" and concluded that admiralty jurisdiction was proper. The judge awarded the City $3,039.88 for dockage along with $1 in nominal damages for trespass. The court ordered Lozman to sell the home at auction. The City purchased it and had it destroyed. The United States Court of Appeals for the Eleventh Circuit affirmed the lower court and Lozman filed a petition for a writ of certiorari with the United States Supreme Court.

In 2013, Lozman gained his first Supreme Court victory, when the Court reversed the Eleventh Circuit in a landmark admiralty opinion, ruling that floating structures are subject to a "reasonable observer" test in determining if they are vessels for the purposes of United States law. Writing for the 7–2 majority, Justice Stephen G. Breyer stated: "Not every floating structure is a 'vessel.’ To state the obvious, a wooden washtub, a plastic dishpan, a swimming platform on pontoons, a large fishing net, a door taken off its hinges, or Pinocchio (when inside the whale) are not 'vessels,' even if they are 'artificial contrivances' capable of floating, moving under tow, and incidentally carrying even a fair-sized item or two when they do so". Chief Justice John Roberts stated in a later interview that the Lozman case was his favorite case of the term. A federal judge later awarded Lozman only $7,500 for his damages. In 2016, Lozman returned to Riviera Beach with a new, larger floating house, bearing a banner that read "Fane Lozman returns, THANK YOU... U.S. Supreme Court".

==== Arrest and second U.S. Supreme Court case ====
Lozman's arrest

The City Council met in regular session on November 15, 2006, at which time the City abandoned its plans to redevelop the waterfront. During a time for members of the public to make comments to the council, Lozman began to raise the subject of corruption charges brought against Palm Beach County officials. Council chairperson Elizabeth Wade interrupted Lozman and instructed him to stop speaking. When Lozman refused, the council member ordered a police officer to "carry him out"; Lozman, objecting that his First Amendment rights were being violated, was then handcuffed and placed in a jail cell at the police station, and charged with disorderly conduct and trespass. The trespass charge was later whited out and modified to one of "resisting w/out violence, to wit obstruction". The state's attorney later dismissed the charges as having "no reasonable likelihood of successful prosecution".

In 2008, Lozman filed a First Amendment retaliation lawsuit, claiming his 2006 arrest for refusing to leave the podium at a City Council meeting and the City's effort to evict him from the City marina were part of an unconstitutional effort to stop him from criticizing the City and its policies.

The case finally went to trial in November 2014, with Lozman representing himself once again on a pro se basis. The district judge instructed the jury that Lozman needed to prove a new charge that was only added for the first time during the second week of trial, that there was no probable cause for the offense of "disturbing a public assembly". The jury found for the City, and Lozman appealed. The Eleventh Circuit affirmed, and Lozman again successfully filed a petition for a writ of certiorari to the United States Supreme Court. During oral argument, Chief Justice Roberts stated: "I found the video pretty chilling. I mean, the fellow is up there for about fifteen seconds, and the next thing he knows he's being led off in handcuffs, speaking in a very calm voice the whole time".

On June 18, 2018, in an eight-to-one opinion authored by Justice Anthony M. Kennedy, the Supreme Court once again ruled in Lozman's favor, vacating the Eleventh Circuit opinion and remanding to the appellate court with instructions to determine whether the City acted with animus in Lozman's arrest. While the Eleventh Circuit was drafting its opinion on remand, Lozman offered to settle the matter for "$650,000, an apology and an invitation to address the city council". After the Eleventh Circuit remanded Lozman's case to the district court, a retrial was scheduled for April 2020. In lieu of a second trial, the City settled with Lozman in February 2020 for $875,000, a substantial increase of $225,000 from Lozman's earlier settlement offer.
