= Nieves v. Bartlett =

- Supreme Court of the United States

Argued November 26, 2018 Decided May 28, 2019
- Full case name: Luis A. Nieves, et al. v. Russell P. Bartlett
- Docket no.: 17-1174
- Citations: 587 U.S. 391 (more) 139 S. Ct. 1715; 204 L. Ed. 2d 1
- Argument: Oral argument
- Opinion announcement: Opinion announcement

Case history
- Prior: Bartlett v. Nieves, 712 F. App'x 613 (9th Cir. 2017); cert. granted, 138 S. Ct. 2709 (2018).

Holding
- Probable cause generally defeats a retaliatory arrest claim, except for when officers under the circumstances would typically exercise their discretion not to make an arrest.

Court membership
- Chief Justice John Roberts Associate Justices Clarence Thomas · Ruth Bader Ginsburg; Stephen Breyer · Samuel Alito; Sonia Sotomayor · Elena Kagan; Neil Gorsuch · Brett Kavanaugh

Case opinions
- Majority: Roberts, joined by Breyer, Alito, Kagan, Kavanaugh; Thomas (except Part II–D)
- Concurrence: Thomas (in part)
- Concur/dissent: Gorsuch
- Concur/dissent: Ginsburg
- Dissent: Sotomayor

Nieves v. Bartlett, 587 U.S. 391 (2019), was a civil rights case in which the Supreme Court of the United States decided that probable cause should generally defeat a retaliatory arrest claim brought under the First Amendment, unless officers under the circumstances would typically exercise their discretion not to make an arrest.

== Background ==
Arctic Man is a snow-themed race occurring annually in the March–April period (as the spring breaks and before the snow and ice thaws) in Interior Alaska that draws around 10,000 spectators and creates a festival atmosphere similar to Burning Man. Because of the potential for drunken misbehavior, the event is patrolled by Alaska State Troopers. At the 2014 event, Robert Bartlett was one of the spectators and brought his recreational vehicle along with a keg of beer. State trooper Sergeant Luis Nieves approached Bartlett, who was visibly intoxicated, and requested him to stow the keg in his RV. Bartlett refused to acknowledge Nieves. As there was no legal issue with having the keg outside the RV or any cause to suspect criminal activity, Nieves continued his route. Later, a younger man was approached by Trooper Bryce Weight, who believed that the man was underage and should not be drinking. Bartlett overheard that, approached the two, told the younger man that he did not have to answer the trooper's question, and loudly instructed Weight to leave the younger man alone. After additional confrontation, Weight pushed Bartlett away, which led to Bartlett becoming physically aggressive. Nieves came by quickly to help Weight subdue Bartlett and arrested him on charges of disorderly conduct and resisting arrest, but they were never followed through on out of budgetary concerns. Bartlett spent some hours in a drunk tank before he was released.

Later, Bartlett filed a lawsuit against Nieves and Weight in the Alaska District Court. Among Bartlett's charges were that he was falsely arrested and imprisoned. He claimed that after Nieves had apprehended him, he told him, "Bet you wish you would have talked to me now." However, evidence from partial body cameras worn by the troopers did not include that statement. The District Court made summary judgement against all of Bartlett's claims and closed the case with prejudice. It concluded that Nieves had probable cause to make the arrest that disallowed Bartlett to make a retaliatory arrest claim, as established in 42 U.S.C. §1983 related to civil action for deprivation of rights. Bartlett took the case to the Ninth Circuit Appeals Court. There, the three-judge panel agreed with the District Court's ruling except on the false arrest charge. The judges argued that Bartlett's claimed quote from Nieves could be read that Nieves had arrested him for not willingly speaking to him earlier, which put into question the probable cause. The Ninth Circuit thus ruled that even if Nieves had probable cause, Bartlett could seek a retaliatory arrest claim based on his First Amendment rights.

That created a split decision in the Circuit Courts. The Supreme Court had heard the case of Lozman v. City of Riviera Beach, which had been brought up through the Eleventh Circuit. It found that the existence of probable cause in one's arrest voided any retaliatory arrest claims that could be made. The Supreme Court reversed that decision but primarily because of Riveria Beach's specific laws in question that appeared to be designed to harass the civilian, not on the broader question of how probable cause and retaliatory arrest claims interacted.

The Supreme Court had ruled in Hartman v. Moore that to be able to claim on retaliatory prosecution, the onus was on the prosecuted person to prove that there was no probable causes that could be assigned by the prosecutors, judges, and juries. The Nieves case is recognized as a legally similar but somewhat different situation from Hartman since instead of having to question the results from prolonged legal evaluation, Nieves questions the on-the-spot judgement call made by an officer.

== Supreme Court ==
Nieves and Weight petitioned for writ of certiorari to the Supreme Court in February 2018, and the Court accepted the case, with oral hearings given on November 26, 2018. Observers to the oral hearing found the Justices concerned on how to develop a proper standard to determine when an arrest can be considered retaliatory; Justice Samuel Alito considered that it would be difficult to set a metric between two extreme cases: that of a man yelling at an officer in a heated setting, and that of a person critical of their local government being arrested on a minor traffic violation.

=== Opinion of the Court ===
The Court issued its decision on May 28, 2019, reversing and remanding the Ninth Circuit's decision. The 6–3 decision, with only Justice Sotomayor fully dissenting, determined that in general, the presence of a probable cause for an arrest defeats a First Amendment retaliatory arrest claim. The court additionally held by a more narrow margin that there are some narrow exceptions to this. Because officers can exercise their discretion in making warrantless arrests for misdemeanor crimes, a plaintiff can succeed on a Section 1983 claim if they can present objective evidence that other similarly situated individuals who were not engaged in protected speech had not been arrested. This finding was supported by Chief Justice Roberts, and Justices Breyer, Alito, Kagan, and Kavanaugh with Justice Thomas dissenting from this section of the opinion. In his partial concurrence, Justice Gorsuch agreed with the majority that "the absence of probable cause is not an absolute requirement of such a claim and its presence is not an absolute defense. Ginsburg opined that she would have reversed the lower decision and would have avoided using this case to establish a rigid rule that may chill free speech, but agreed that probable cause alone is not sufficient to defeat a retaliatory arrest claim.

==== Sotomayor's dissent ====
In her dissent, Justice Sotomayor, like Ginsburg, agreed with the majority judgement that probable cause alone cannot defeat a retaliatory arrest claim, but argues that the majority opinion threatens to produce arbitrary results and allow even clear cut cases of abuse. Her main point of dissent was that the majority opinion "fetishizes one specific type of motive evidence—treatment of comparators—at the expense of other modes of proof." The majority opinion, she contends, would allow for officers to openly state their unconstitutional motives but be immune from litigation in the absence of comparative evidence, providing a number of hypothetical and historic examples of such conduct that would be permissible under the majority opinion. She points to literature on unconstitutional race-based selective prosecution and notes how difficult it is for plaintiffs in that case to provide comparative evidence of the type the majority decision now requires. The danger in this, she argues, is that it threatens to produce the same effects as the absolute threshold the court rejected.

She agrees with Ginsburg that existing precedent is the right course to take. The standard Sotomayor presents is that the plaintiff bears responsibility to show that "unconstitutional animus" was a motivating factor in the arrest and that the burden then shifts to the defendant who must show that they would have taken the action regardless of any reason to retaliate. Gorsuch suggested an evidential standard for clear and convincing of a prohibited purpose which she critiques but refrains from rejecting outright.

== See also ==
- List of United States Supreme Court cases involving the First Amendment
- List of United States Supreme Court cases by the Roberts Court
- List of United States Supreme Court cases, volume 587
