= Riviera Beach, Florida =

- City
- City of Riviera Beach
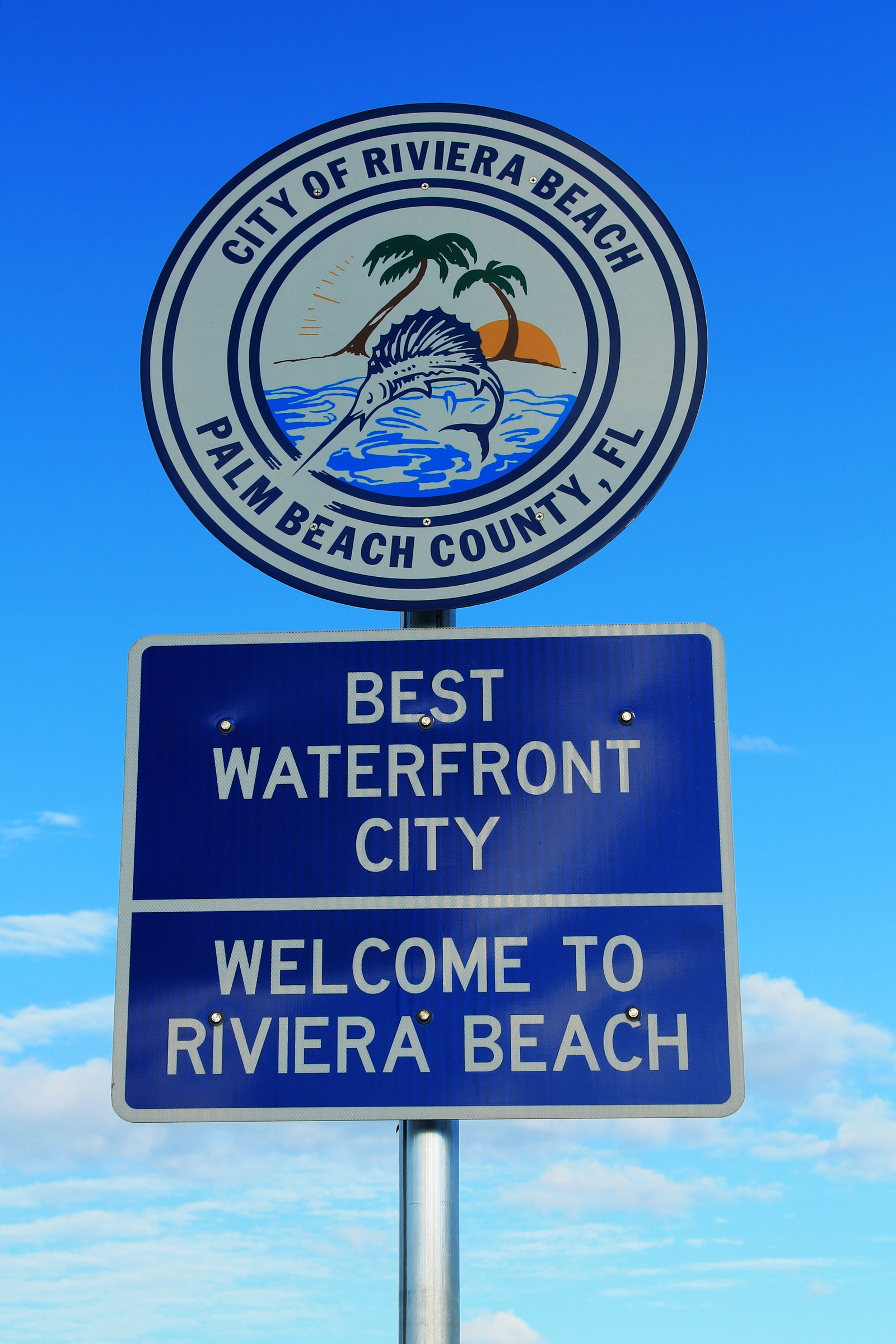

- Flag Seal
- Nickname: Conchtown
- Motto: "Best Waterfront City"
- Location of Riviera Beach in Palm Beach County, Florida
- Coordinates: 26°46′48″N 80°4′2″W
- Country: United States
- State: Florida
- County: Palm Beach
- Settled (Lake Worth Settlement): c. Early 1860s–1880
- Settled (Oak Lawn Settlement): c. 1881–1892
- Platted (Riviera Settlement): c. 1893–1921
- Incorporated (Town of Riviera): September 29, 1922
- Incorporated (Town of Riviera Beach): 1941
- Incorporated (City of Riviera Beach): 1959
- Named for: French Riviera

Government
  - Type: Council-Manager
  - Mayor: Ronnie L. Felder (D)
  - Council Members: Tradrick McCoy, Shirley D. Lanier, Douglas Lawson, KaShamba Miller-Anderson, and Dr. Glen Spiritis
  - City Manager: Jonathan E. Evans
  - City Clerk: Debrah Hall
  - City Attorney: Dawn Wynn

Area
  - Total: 9.66 sq mi (25.01 km^{2})
  - Land: 8.28 sq mi (21.44 km^{2})
  - Water: 1.38 sq mi (3.57 km^{2})
- Elevation: 16 ft (4.9 m)

Population (2020)
  - Total: 37,604
  - Density: 4,543/sq mi (1,754/km^{2})
- Time zone: UTC– 05:00 (Eastern (EST))
  - Summer (DST): UTC– 04:00 (EDT)
- ZIP codes: 33403, 33404, 33407, 33410, 33418
- Area codes: 561, 728
- FIPS code: 12-60975
- GNIS feature ID: 2404626
- Website: https://www.rivierabch.com

Riviera Beach is a city in Palm Beach County, Florida, United States, which was incorporated on September 29, 1922. Due to the location of its eastern boundary, it is also the easternmost municipality in the Miami metropolitan area. In the 2020 U.S. census, the total population of Riviera Beach residents was 37,604 people.

Riviera Beach is predominantly an African-American city and it is on the list of U.S. cities with African American majority populations. It is home to the Port of Palm Beach and a United States Coast Guard station, and has its own marina. Riviera Beach is home to Blue Heron Bridge, one of the country's top-rated beach dive sites. In 2015, Riviera Beach renamed part of Old Dixie Highway that runs inside the city limits as President Barack Obama Highway. The city is also home to Rapids Water Park, a water park attraction for both tourists and residents.

== History ==
Riviera Beach was originally called Oak Lawn, but the settlement was renamed Riviera in 1893. It wasn't until 1941 that "Beach" was added, though it was incorporated in 1922 as only the "Town of Riviera". In 1959, it converted from a "town" status to the present-day "City of Riviera Beach". For the first half of the 20th century, its nickname was "Conchtown", after the many Conch people (Bahamians and Bahamian Americans) who resided in the city. The city was named after the French Riviera.

== Geography ==
The approximate coordinates for the City of Riviera Beach is located in the northeast central part of Palm Beach County.

According to the United States Census Bureau, the city has a total area of 9.8 square miles (25 km^{2}), of which 8.3 square miles (21 km^{2}) is land and 1.5 square miles (3.9 km^{2}) (15.33%) is water. The eastern part of the city includes most of Singer Island, a peninsula on the Atlantic coast of Palm Beach County, Florida, which is separated from the mainland portion of the city by Lake Worth's Lake Worth Lagoon.

=== Climate ===
Riviera Beach has a tropical climate, more specifically a tropical rainforest climate (Köppen climate classification Af), as its driest month (February) averages 64.8mm of precipitation, meeting the minimum standard of 60mm in the driest month needed to qualify for that designation. Much of the year is warm to hot in Riviera Beach, and frost is extremely rare. As is typical in South Florida, there are two basic seasons in Riviera Beach, a mild and dry winter (November through April), and a hot and wet summer (May through October). Daily thundershowers are common in the hot season, though they are brief. The city of Riviera Beach is home to many varieties of tropical vegetation, which can be seen in its variety of plants, trees, and flowers all over South Florida and the city itself.

Climate data for Riviera Beach, Florida
Month	Jan	Feb	Mar	Apr	May	Jun	Jul	Aug	Sep	Oct	Nov	Dec	Year
Mean daily maximum °F (°C)	75 (24)	77 (25)	79 (26)	82 (28)	86 (30)	89 (32)	90 (32)	90 (32)	88 (31)	85 (29)	80 (27)	76 (24)	83 (28)
Mean daily minimum °F (°C)	57 (14)	59 (15)	62 (17)	66 (19)	71 (22)	74 (23)	76 (24)	76 (24)	75 (24)	72 (22)	66 (19)	60 (16)	68 (20)
Average precipitation inches (mm)	3.13 (80)	2.94 (75)	4.59 (117)	3.66 (93)	4.51 (115)	8.30 (211)	5.76 (146)	7.95 (202)	8.35 (212)	5.13 (130)	4.75 (121)	3.38 (86)	62.45 (1,588)
Source: The Weather Channel

== Demographics ==
Historical population
Census	Pop.	Note	%±
1930	811		—
1940	1,981		144.3%
1950	4,065		105.2%
1960	13,046		220.9%
1970	21,401		64.0%
1980	26,489		23.8%
1990	27,639		4.3%
2000	29,884		8.1%
2010	32,488		8.7%
2020	37,604		15.7%
U.S. Decennial Census

=== Racial and ethnic composition ===
Riviera Beach, Florida – Racial and ethnic composition Note: the US Census treats Hispanic/Latino as an ethnic category. This table excludes Latinos from the racial categories and assigns them to a separate category. Hispanics/Latinos may be of any race.
Race / Ethnicity (NH = Non-Hispanic)	Pop 2000	Pop 2010	Pop 2020	% 2000	% 2010	% 2020
White alone (NH)	7,586	7,440	8,302	25.38%	22.90%	22.08%
Black or African American alone (NH)	20,066	21,126	22,877	67.15%	65.03%	60.84%
Native American or Alaska Native alone (NH)	38	76	45	0.13%	0.23%	0.12%
Asian alone (NH)	295	765	1,087	0.99%	2.35%	2.89%
Native Hawaiian or Pacific Islander alone (NH)	7	18	7	0.02%	0.06%	0.02%
Other race alone (NH)	49	98	164	0.16%	0.30%	0.44%
Mixed race or Multiracial (NH)	495	547	1,082	1.66%	1.68%	2.88%
Hispanic or Latino (any race)	1,348	2,418	4,040	4.51%	7.44%	10.74%
Total	29,884	32,488	37,604	100.00%	100.00%	100.00%

=== 2020 census ===
As of the 2020 census, Riviera Beach had a population of 37,604. The median age was 39.4 years. 23.4% of residents were under the age of 18 and 18.0% of residents were 65 years of age or older. For every 100 females there were 92.7 males, and for every 100 females age 18 and over there were 88.9 males age 18 and over.

100.0% of residents lived in urban areas, while 0.0% lived in rural areas.

There were 14,120 households in Riviera Beach, of which 31.6% had children under the age of 18 living in them. Of all households, 34.9% were married-couple households, 20.5% were households with a male householder and no spouse or partner present, and 37.3% were households with a female householder and no spouse or partner present. About 26.9% of all households were made up of individuals and 11.0% had someone living alone who was 65 years of age or older.

There were 17,868 housing units, of which 21.0% were vacant. The homeowner vacancy rate was 2.7% and the rental vacancy rate was 7.7%.

Racial composition as of the 2020 census
Race	Number	Percent
White	9,214	24.5%
Black or African American	23,207	61.7%
American Indian and Alaska Native	118	0.3%
Asian	1,111	3.0%
Native Hawaiian and Other Pacific Islander	15	0.0%
Some other race	1,289	3.4%
Two or more races	2,650	7.0%

=== 2010 census ===
As of the 2010 United States census, there were 32,488 people, 12,015 households, and 7,710 families residing in the city.

=== 2000 census ===
As of 2000, 29.3% had children under the age of 18 living with them, 37.1% were married couples living together, 27.0% had a female householder with no husband present, and 29.3% were non-families. 22.3% of all households were made up of individuals, and 6.1% had someone living alone who was 65 years of age or older. The average household size was 3.04 and the average family size was 4.62.

In 2000, the population was spread out, with 37.5% under the age of 18, 10.0% from 18 to 24, 27.1% from 25 to 44, 20.7% from 45 to 64, and 8.7% who were 65 years of age or older. The median age was 30 years. For every 100 females, there were 107.5 males. For every 100 females age 18 and over, there were 105.6 males. The median income for a household in the city was $28,715, and the median income for a family was $26,756.

In 2000, males had a median income of $27,232 versus $22,410 for females. The per capita income for the city was $13,159. About 29.6% of families and 32.3% of the population were below the poverty line, including 35.1% of those under age 18 and 21.4% of those age 65 or over.

As of 2000, those who solely spoke English at home accounted for 90.30% of all residents, while speakers of Spanish were 4.71%, French Creole 2.42%, and French speakers 0.95%.

== Government ==
Riviera Beach has a mayor–council–manager form of government. Ronnie Felder was elected to a second three-year term as its mayor in 2022. Jonathan Evans, who was fired as city manager by three city council members in 2017 "for cause, for misfeasance" but without further explanation, returned to that position in 2019, and as of July 2022 was in negotiations for a contract renewal. The city is divided into five districts, each with a council member; the mayor does not vote.

The Riviera Beach City Council has received national attention for its repeated clashes with local activist Fane Lozman, starting with his successful lawsuit, brought under Florida's open-meetings law, to prevent them from seizing the marina under eminent domain and selling it to private developers. In 2013, Lozman won against the city at the United States Supreme Court in an admiralty case after the city seized his floating home. In 2018, Lozman won a rare second victory at the court, this one arising from his arrest during a city council meeting in November 2006.

== Education ==
Public Elementary Schools

- Dr. Mary McLeod Bethune Elementary School
- Lincoln Elementary School (formerly Lincoln High School was only for black students during segregation, and before that it was a called West Riviera Junior High School)
- Washington Elementary School
- West Riviera Elementary School

Public Middle School

- John F Kennedy Middle School (originally John F. Kennedy High School was only for black students during segregation)

Public High Schools

- Inlet Grove High School
- Suncoast High School (originally Riviera Beach High School was only for white students during segregation)

Charter High School

- Riviera Beach Preparatory and Achievement Academy (Grades 5–12)

== Library ==
The original Riviera Beach Public Library was located at West Heron Boulevard until it had a mold and mildew problem. As a result, they decided to relocate to a new building, starting their search in 2020. The Library Director at the time, Rodney Freeman, wanted to make sure the new library matched the community’s needs, so they made sure to survey residents to see what they expected from a new library.

Based on the library’s mission as well as the community’s input, they decided to choose a location on North Congress Avenue near the city’s Youth Empowerment Center to encourage the youth in the community to continue to improve themselves. The biggest issue they faced with the new location is the decrease in size. The new building is about 10,000 square feet, which is a 4,000 square foot decrease from the West Heron Boulevard building. They worked with Opening the Book North America to design the space. Once renovations were complete, the library opened to the public in July 2021.

With 32,723 residents to provide services to, the collection contains 70,257 volumes and circulates about 14,949 materials a year. They also have digital subscriptions to multiple sources, including Black Life in America, which gives users access to records spanning from 1704 to today about African Americans’ experiences. They also have an African American Room where they provide even more digital resources on their smartboard about news regarding African American history.

== Transportation ==
Riviera Beach is served by several bus routes operated by PalmTran.

== Business and economy ==
- EDF Incorporated (1978)

== Notable people ==
- Anthony Carter (born 1960) – Michigan and NFL wide receiver, 3× Pro Bowl selection
- Paul DeJong (born 1993) – MLB infielder for the San Francisco Giants.
- Devin Hester (born 1982) – NFL record-holding kick returner for Chicago Bears and Atlanta Falcons
- Elizabeth Jacobson (1984–2005) – USAF airman, killed in Iraq War
- Richard Rellford (born 1964) – professional basketball player
- Burt Reynolds (1936–2018) – actor; his father was once the Riviera Beach Chief of Police
- Willie Young (born 1985) – NFL defensive end

== See also ==
- Amaryllis (ship)
