= Hartman v. Moore =

- Supreme Court of the United States

Argued January 10, 2006 Decided April 26, 2006
- Full case name: Michael Hartman, Frank Kormann, Pierce McIntosh, Norman Robbins, and Robert Edwards v. William G. Moore, Jr.
- Docket no.: 04-1495
- Citations: 547 U.S. 250 (more) 125 S. Ct. 2977; 164 L. Ed. 2d 441; 74 U.S.L.W. 4209; 06 Cal. Daily Op. Serv. 3435; 2006 Daily Journal D.A.R. 4985; 19 Fla. L. Weekly Fed. S 164; 2006 U.S. LEXIS 3450

Case history
- Prior: Dismissed in part, Moore v. Valder, No. 91-2491 (N.D. Tex. Sept. 21, 1992); case transferred, dismissed in part, Moore v. Hartman, No. 92-2288, 1993 U.S. Dist. LEXIS 13943 (D.D.C. Sept. 24, 1993); affirmed in part, reversed sub nom. Moore v. Valder, 65 F.3d 189 (D.C. Cir. 1995); cert. denied, 519 U.S. 820 (1996); judgment for defendants in part, No. 92-2288 (D.D.C. Feb. 5, 1998); affirmed in part, reversed sub nom. Moore v. United States, 213 F.3d 705 (D.C. Cir. 2000); cert. denied sub nom. Moore v. Valder, 531 U.S. 978 (2000); motion for reconsideration denied sub nom. Moore v. Hartman, 332 F. Supp. 2d 252 (D.D.C. 2004); affirmed, 388 F.3d 871 (D.C. Cir. 2004); rehearing en banc denied, No. 03-5241, 2005 U.S. App. LEXIS 1514 (D.C. Cir. Jan. 31, 2005); cert. granted, 125 S. Ct. 2977 (2005)
- Subsequent: Moore's motion to compel testimony granted, 241 F.R.D. 59 (2007)

Holding
- A plaintiff in a retaliatory-prosecution action against federal officials must plead and show the absence of probable cause for pressing the underlying criminal charges.

Court membership
- Chief Justice John Roberts Associate Justices John P. Stevens · Antonin Scalia; Anthony Kennedy · David Souter; Clarence Thomas · Ruth Bader Ginsburg; Stephen Breyer · Samuel Alito

Case opinions
- Majority: Souter, joined by Stevens, Scalia, Kennedy, Thomas
- Dissent: Ginsburg, joined by Breyer
- Roberts and Alito took no part in the consideration or decision of the case.

Hartman v. Moore, 547 U.S. 250 (2006), is a decision by the Supreme Court of the United States involving the pleading standard for retaliatory prosecution claims against government officials. After a successful lobbying attempt by the CEO of a manufacturing company against competing devices that the US Postal Service supported, the CEO found himself the target of an investigation by US postal inspectors and a criminal prosecution that was dismissed for lack of evidence. The CEO then filed suit against the inspectors and other government officials for seeking to prosecute him in retaliation for exercising his First Amendment rights to criticize postal policy. The Court ruled 5-2 that to prove that the prosecution was caused by a retaliatory motive, the plaintiff bringing such a claim must allege and prove that the criminal charges were brought without probable cause.

== Background ==
=== Campaign against USPS policies ===
In the 1980s, William G. Moore, Jr. was the chief executive officer of Recognition Equipment Inc. (REI), which manufactured a multiline optical character reader for interpreting multiple lines of text. REI initially received some $50 million from the United States Postal Service to develop this technology for reading and sorting mail, but the U.S. Postmaster General and other postal officials were urging mail senders to use nine-digit ZIP codes ("Zip + 4"), which would provide enough routing information on one line of text to allow single-line scanning machines to sort mail by reading just that line.

Many Members of Congress and federal research officers had reservations about the Postal Service's Zip + 4 policy and its intended reliance on single-line readers, in part because of the foreign sources of the equipment. Moore built on this opposition by lobbying Congress, testifying before congressional committees, and supporting a "Buy American" rider to the Postal Service's 1985 appropriations bill. Moore alleged that he and REI had received requests from the Postmaster General to be quiet, yet his company proceeded to support its agenda and hired a public relations firm recommended by a Postal Service official.

=== Investigation and prosecution ===
The campaign succeeded, and in July 1985 the Postal Service embraced multiline technology. However, the Postal Service's ensuing order of multiline equipment (valued between $250–400 million) went to a competing firm. Moore and REI were also soon the target of two investigations by postal inspectors. The first looked into the purported payment of kickbacks by the PR firm to the official who recommended its services, and the second sought to document REI's possibly improper role in the search for a new Postmaster General.

Notwithstanding very limited evidence linking Moore and REI to any wrongdoing, an Assistant United States Attorney decided to bring criminal charges against them, and in 1988 the grand jury indicted Moore, REI, and REI's vice president. At the close of the Government's case, after six weeks of trial, however, the District Court concluded that there was a "complete lack of direct evidence" connecting the defendants to any of the criminal wrongdoing alleged, and it granted the REI defendants' motion for judgment of acquittal.

=== Moore's lawsuit ===
Moore then brought an action in the United States District Court for the Northern District of Texas for civil liability under Bivens v. Six Unknown Named Agents, 403 U.S. 388 (1971), against the prosecutor and five postal inspectors. His complaint raised five causes of action, including the claim that the prosecutor and the inspectors had engineered his criminal prosecution in retaliation for criticism of the Postal Service, thus violating the First Amendment. Moore argued that the postal inspectors launched a criminal investigation against him well before any suspicion of the two schemes actually arose, that the inspectors targeted him for his lobbying activities, and that they pressured the United States Attorney's Office to have him indicted. He also sought recovery from the federal government of the United States under the Federal Tort Claims Act (FTCA). The District Court dismissed the claims against the Assistant United States Attorney in accordance with the absolute immunity for prosecutorial judgment, and rejected an abuse of process claim against the inspectors.

The remaining claims were transferred to the United States District Court for the District of Columbia, where Moore's suit was dismissed in its entirety, only to have the United States Court of Appeals for the District of Columbia Circuit reinstate the retaliatory prosecution claim. The District Court then permitted limited discovery on that matter regarding the inspectors, but again dismissed the remaining charges against the United States and the prosecutor. Although Moore succeeded in having the District of Columbia Circuit reinstate his FTCA claim against the United States, the dismissal of his claims against the prosecutor was affirmed.

With the remainder of the case back in District Court, the inspectors moved for summary judgment, urging that because the underlying criminal charges were supported by probable cause they were entitled to qualified immunity from a retaliatory-prosecution suit. The District Court denied the motion, and the Court of Appeals affirmed.

The Courts of Appeals had divided on the issue of requiring evidence of a lack of probable cause in 42 U.S.C. § 1983 and Bivens retaliatory-prosecution suits. Some circuits burdened plaintiffs with the obligation to show its absence, Others, including the District of Columbia Circuit, imposed no such requirement. The U.S. Supreme Court granted certiorari to resolve the circuit split.

== Opinion of the Court ==
Writing for a five-justice majority, Justice David Souter delivered the Court's ruling that the plaintiff in a Bivens action for retaliatory prosecution must allege and prove the lack of probable cause for pressing the underlying criminal charges. Justice Ruth Bader Ginsburg filed a dissent, which was joined by Justice Stephen Breyer.

Two justices did not participate in the case. Justice Samuel Alito was confirmed to the Court on January 31, 2006, 21 days after it heard oral argument. Chief Justice John Roberts was recused from the case because, as a judge on the D.C. Circuit Court of Appeals, he had participated in that court's January 31, 2005 decision to deny the inspectors' motion for rehearing en banc.

=== Souter's majority opinion ===
Though the Court adopted the position of the inspector defendants that the absence of probable cause should be an essential element of this claim, it disagreed with their reasoning, and instead based the need for that element upon the requirement to prove causation.

The inspector defendants had first argued that the "objective" burden of proving lack of probable cause was needed to filter out frivolous claims. However, the Court noted that in the past 25 years, fewer than two dozen actions for retaliatory prosecution had been before the Courts of Appeals, and there was no sign that they were brought disproportionately in the circuits that did not require the absence of probable cause to be established.

The defendants also urged that the traditional common law tort of malicious prosecution should be instructive, as that cause of action required a plaintiff, following acquittal, to show that the criminal action was begun without probable cause for charging the crime in the first place. However, the Court considered common-law tort elements to be more "a source of inspired examples than of prefabricated components of Bivens torts."

The Court believed that imposing that burden on plaintiffs was instead best justified by the need to establish causation, "from animus to injury, with details specific to retaliatory-prosecution cases." Although causal connection is required in any retaliation action, the Court considered that retaliatory prosecution claims presented an additional difficulty.

The ordinary claim is one in which the government agent allegedly harboring the animus is also the individual allegedly taking the adverse action, as in the paradigmatic case of a public employee being fired for criticizing the government. Those cases require "but-for" causation, meaning that the adverse action would not have been taken but for the retaliatory motive of the official. Evidence of the animus and the challenged action has been taken as sufficient for a circumstantial demonstration that the one caused the other.

The Court believed retaliatory prosecution claims differed from such ordinary retaliation claims in two key respects. First, when the claimed retaliation is the bringing of criminal charges, there will always be evidence showing whether there was or was not probable cause for the underlying charge. Demonstrating that there was no probable cause will tend to show that retaliation was the but-for cause for instigating the prosecution, while, conversely, establishing the existence of probable cause will suggest that prosecution would have occurred regardless. The Court did not conclude that this alone meant that the plaintiff should be required to plead and prove no probable cause, but it did mean that any case for retaliatory prosecution would likely litigate the issue.

Second, the causal relationship will be much more complex than in ordinary retaliation cases, because prosecutorial immunity bars the plaintiff from suing the official who directly caused the injury of a retaliatory prosecution. The defendant will instead be an official such as the postal inspectors, who may have influenced the prosecutorial decision but did not make it. The Court viewed this less as a cause of action for retaliatory prosecution, but rather for "successful retaliatory inducement to prosecute." The required causal connection is therefore between the retaliatory motive of one person and the action of another.

The problem is then that evidence of an inspector's motive does not necessarily show that the inspector induced a prosecution that would not have been otherwise pressed. There is furthermore a long-standing presumption that a prosecutor has legitimate grounds for the actions he takes, supported by the Court's position that "judicial intrusion into executive discretion of such high order should be minimal." Because some kind of allegation is then needed to bridge the gap between the motive of the nonprosecuting official and the prosecutor's action, to address the presumption of legitimate prosecutorial decisionmaking, "retaliatory motive on the part of an official urging prosecution combined with an absence of probable cause supporting the prosecutor's decision to go forward are reasonable grounds to suspend the presumption of regularity behind the charging decision."

The Court observed that it could have left the causal gap to be filled by "such pleading and proof as the circumstances allow." The disclosure of a prosecutor's own retaliatory motive would be significant, as would evidence that he merely rubber-stamped the work of his investigators. However, the Court believed that those examples "are likely to be rare and consequently poor guides in structuring a cause of action." Furthermore, because the issue is so likely to be raised in such litigation at some point, "a requirement to plead and prove its absence will usually be cost[-]free by any incremental reckoning."

=== Ginsburg's dissent ===
Justice Ginsburg filed a dissenting opinion, which was joined by Justice Stephen Breyer. She believed that the lower court's ruling had struck a proper balance that was consistent with Court precedent.

Ginsburg began by noting that the Court of Appeals had determined that "the evidence of retaliatory motive [came] close to the proverbial smoking gun." The record also indicated that the postal inspectors engaged in "unusual prodding," strenuously urging a reluctant U.S. Attorney's Office to press charges against Moore. Following circuit precedent, the Court of Appeals held that "once a plaintiff shows [conduct sheltered by the First Amendment] to have been a motivating factor in the decision to press charges," the burden shifts to the defending officials to show that the case would have been pursued anyway.

Because the case was at this stage directed only against the instigating postal inspectors, Ginsburg did not believe that the plaintiff—"the alleged victim"—should bear the burden of pleading and proving the lack of probable cause for the prosecution. She would have instead applied the same burden that the Court of Appeals did, requiring the postal inspectors to show that the U.S. Attorney's Office would have pursued the case even absent "retaliatory motive and importuning."

Ginsburg believed that the majority's burden of proof allocation would only check "entirely baseless" prosecutions. "So long as the retaliators present evidence barely sufficient to establish probable cause and persuade a prosecutor to act on their thin information, they could accomplish their mission cost[-]free. Their victim, on the other hand, would incur not only the costs entailed in mounting a defense, he likely would sustain a reputational loss as well, and neither loss would be compensable under federal law." Ginsburg would have preferred the D.C. Circuit's "more speech-protective formulation," in which recovery remains possible "in those rare cases where strong motive evidence combines with weak probable cause to support a finding that the [investigation and ensuing] prosecution would not have occurred but for the [defending] officials' retaliatory animus."
