= Ku Klux Klan Act =

1871 Act of the United States Congress

Enforcement Act of 1871
- Long title: An Act to enforce the Provisions of the Fourteenth Amendment to the Constitution of the United States, and for other Purposes
- Nicknames: Civil Rights Act of 1871, Ku Klux Klan Act, Third Enforcement Act
- Enacted by: the 42nd United States Congress

Citations
- Public law: 42−22
- Statutes at Large: ch. 22, 17 Stat. 13

Legislative history
- Introduced in the House as H.R. 320 by Samuel Shellabarger (R-OH) on March 28, 1871; Committee consideration by House Select Committee on the President's Message, Senate Judiciary; Passed the House on April 7, 1871 (118–91); Passed the Senate on April 14, 1871 (45–19); Reported by the joint conference committee on April 19, 1871; agreed to by the House on April 19, 1871 (93–74) and by the Senate on April 19, 1871 (36–13); Signed into law by President Ulysses S. Grant on April 20, 1871

United States Supreme Court cases
- United States v. Harris, 106 U.S. 629 (1883); Bogan v. Scott-Harris, 523 U.S. 44 (1997) See also the "Civil rights liability under Section 1979 of the Revised Statutes" section at Template:US14thAmendment.

The Enforcement Act of 1871 (17 Stat. 13), also known as the Ku Klux Klan Act, Third Enforcement Act, Third Ku Klux Klan Act, Civil Rights Act of 1871, or Force Act of 1871, is an act of the United States Congress that was intended to combat the paramilitary vigilantism of the Ku Klux Klan. The act made certain acts committed by private persons federal offenses including conspiring to deprive citizens of their rights to hold office, serve on juries, or enjoy the equal protection of law. The act authorized the president to deploy federal troops to counter the Klan and to suspend the constitutional right of habeas corpus to make arrests without charge.

The act was passed by the 42nd United States Congress and signed into law by President Ulysses S. Grant on April 20, 1871. The act was the last of three Enforcement Acts passed by Congress from 1870 to 1871 during the Reconstruction era to combat attacks upon the suffrage rights of African Americans. The statute has been subject to only minor changes since then, but has been the subject of voluminous interpretation by courts.

This legislation was asked for by President Grant and passed within one month of when he sent the request to Congress. Grant's request was a result of the reports he was receiving of widespread racial threats in the Deep South, particularly in South Carolina. He felt that he needed to have Congress delegate broader authority to the president before he could effectively intervene. (Note: Section 5 of the Fourteenth Amendment only empowers Congress to enforce its provisions. Therefore, only Congress is able to enforce the amendment via acts like this.) The act empowered the president for the first time to both suppress state disorders on his own initiative and to suspend the writ of habeas corpus. Grant did not hesitate to use this authority on numerous occasions during his presidency, and as a result the KKK was completely dismantled (ending the "first Klan" era) and did not resurface in any meaningful way until the beginning of the 20th century.

Several of the act's provisions still exist today as codified statutes. Congress delegated to the federal judiciary the authority to enforce violations of civil rights, with the most important of these enabling statutes being section 1979 of the Revised Statutes (42 U.S.C. § 1983) entitled Civil action for deprivation of rights. It is the most widely used civil rights enforcement statute, allowing people to sue in civil court over civil rights violations committed by a state. (Note: 42 U.S.C 1979 only applies to the states, territories, and the District of Columbia. Congress has never enacted legislation permitting people to sue over civil rights violations committed by the federal government. However, the Supreme Court has held that there are limited causes of actions against the federal government in Bivens v. Six Unknown Named Agents.)

== Legislative breakdown ==
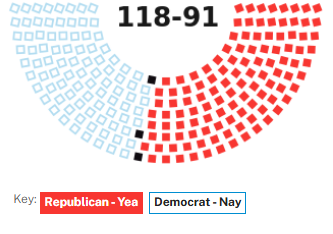
The vote breakdown in the US House by party of the Third Enforcement Act of 1871.

H.R. 320 was brought to the floor of the US House for a vote on April 7, 1871. Four parties were present for the vote. Republicans voted 115 in favor, 0 against. Democrats voted 0 in favor, 91 against. Liberal Republicans voted 2 in favor 0 against. Independent Republicans voted 1 in favor, 0 against. 18 members did not vote.

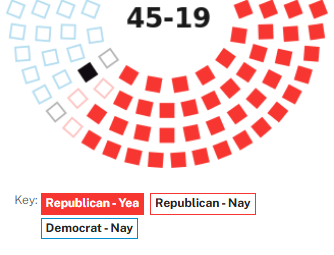
The vote breakdown in the US Senate by party of the Third Enforcement Act of 1871.

It then moved to the US Senate, where it was brought to a floor vote on April 14, 1871. Three parties were present for the vote. 44 Republicans voted in favor, 3 voted against. 0 Democrats voted in favor, 14 voted against. 1 Liberal Republican voted in favor, 2 voted against. 6 members did not vote.

== History ==
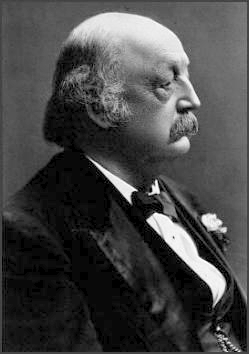
Benjamin Franklin Butler drafted the initial version of the third Enforcement Bill.

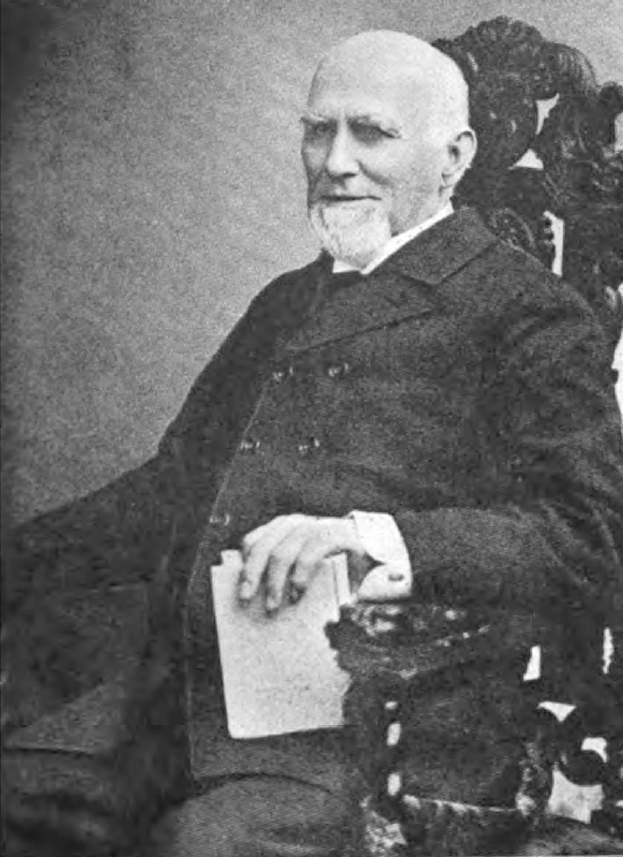
Samuel Shellbarger wrote the final version that passed and was signed into law.

In response to political violence by the Ku Klux Klan and others during the Reconstruction era following the American Civil War, Congress passed three Enforcement Acts giving the federal government broader powers to guarantee citizens' constitutional rights. The third of these acts, enacted in April 1871, gave the president the power to imprison people without a trial (known as suspending the writ of habeas corpus) and to use the federal military on domestic soil to enforce constitutional rights, among other measures.

In January 1871, Republican Senator John Scott of Pennsylvania convened a congressional committee to hear testimony from witnesses of Klan atrocities. In February, Republican Congressman Benjamin Franklin Butler of Massachusetts introduced his anti-Klan bill, intended to enforce both the Fourteenth Amendment and the Civil Rights Act of 1866. Butler's bill was narrowly defeated in the House, whereupon Republican Rep. Samuel Shellabarger, of Ohio, introduced a substitute bill, only slightly less sweeping than Butler's original. This bill brought a few holdout Republicans into line, and the bill narrowly passed the House, sailed through the Senate, and was signed into law on April 20 by President Grant.

=== Use during Reconstruction ===
After the Civil War, President Ulysses S. Grant conducted an aggressive—and ultimately successful—campaign against the Ku Klux Klan and its offshoots (such as the Knights of the White Camellia) from the 1860s to the 1870s. Grant deployed federal soldiers to arrest Klan members, enlisted U.S. attorneys to try their cases, supported Congressional legislation like the Ku Klux Klan Act, and organized federal judges to oversee Klan trials. Under the Klan Act during Reconstruction, federal troops, rather than state militias, were used to enforce the law, and Klansmen were prosecuted in federal court, where juries were sometimes predominantly black. Hundreds of Klan members were fined or imprisoned, and habeas corpus was suspended in nine counties in South Carolina. These efforts were so successful that the Klan was destroyed in South Carolina and decimated throughout the rest of the former Confederacy, where it had already been in decline for several years. The Klan was not to exist again until its renewal in 1915. During its brief existence, however, the "first era" Klan did achieve many of its goals in the South, such as denying voting rights to Southern blacks.

In its early history, under the Grant Administration, this act was used, along with the Force Act, to bring to justice those who were violating the Civil Rights of newly freed African Americans. After the end of the Grant Administration, and the dismantling of Reconstruction under Rutherford B. Hayes, enforcement of the act fell into disuse and few cases were brought under the statute for almost a hundred years.

=== Use during and after presidency of Donald Trump ===
In December 2020, the NAACP along with the Michigan Welfare Rights Organization and a group of Detroit voters sued U.S. president Donald Trump along with his presidential campaign and the Republican National Committee under the act as well as the Voting Rights Act. According to the lawsuit, President Trump and the Republican Party "coordinated conspiracy to disenfranchise Black voters" through legal actions intended to overturn the results of the 2020 presidential election in Michigan, Georgia and Pennsylvania via "intimidation and coercion of election officials and volunteers".

In February 2021, the NAACP and law firm Cohen Milstein filed another lawsuit invoking the act on behalf of U.S. Representative Bennie Thompson. Other congresspersons were to join the litigation as plaintiffs. The February suit was filed against President Donald Trump, Rudy Giuliani, the Proud Boys, and the Oath Keepers. It alleges violations of the act pertaining to attempts to reject certification of the election results during the 2021 United States Electoral College vote count, as well as alleging conspiracy to incite violence leading to the 2021 United States Capitol attack. Following lawsuits filed by Thompson and Swalwell, the Lawyers' Committee for Civil Rights Under Law filed its complaint on behalf of seven officers working with United States Capitol Police accusing Trump, Roger Stone, Proud Boys, Stop the Steal, Oath Keepers and other persons who conspired to attack the Capitol under the same act and the D.C. Bias-Related Crimes Act. On February 2, 2022, Vindman sued several Trump allies, alleging that they intimidated and retaliated against him while he testified in Congress, and thereby violated the Ku Klux Klan Act of 1871. The defendants in the lawsuit are Donald Trump Jr., Rudy Giuliani, former White House deputy chief of staff Dan Scavino, and former White House deputy communications director Julia Hahn.

In 2021, plaintiffs involved in the Texas Trump Train incident during the 2020 Biden-Harris presidential campaign sued the city of San Marcos, Texas, and several individual defendants under the Ku Klux Klan Act in the U.S. District Court for the Western District of Texas. In 2023, San Marcos and two individual defendants settled with the plaintiffs. On September 23, 2024, a jury found one of the remaining six defendants liable for $30,000 in punitive damages to be split among the three plaintiffs and awarded $10,000 in compensatory damages to the bus driver. The Austin American Statesman noted that "[t]he verdict marks the first time in the modern era that a jury has found a defendant liable under the support-or-advocacy clauses of the 1871 Klan Act".

In July 2026, Mahmoud Khalil sued the Heritage Foundation, Canary Mission, Betar, and several Trump administration officials, alleging that these parties' participation in a "public-private partnership" to detain him violated the act's restriction on coordination between the government and vigilantes.

== Section 1 (42 USC § 1983) ==
Section 1 of the act, which has since been amended and codified as section 1979 of the Revised Statutes (42 U.S.C. § 1983) and is also known simply as "Section 1983", authorized monetary and injunctive relief against anyone who, acting under the authority of state law, deprived a person of rights guaranteed by the U.S. Constitution or federal law. Section 1983 is the most prominent and commonly-litigated civil rights statute.

Section 1979 of the Revised Statutes now reads:

Every person who under color of any statute, ordinance, regulation, custom, or usage, of any State or Territory or the District of Columbia, subjects, or causes to be subjected, any citizen of the United States or other person within the jurisdiction thereof to the deprivation of any rights, privileges, or immunities secured by the Constitution and laws, shall be liable to the party injured in an action at law, Suit in equity, or other proper proceeding for redress, except that in any action brought against a judicial officer for an act or omission taken in such officer's judicial capacity, injunctive relief shall not be granted unless a declaratory decree was violated or declaratory relief was unavailable. For the purposes of this section, any act of Congress applicable exclusively to the District of Columbia shall be considered to be a statute of the District of Columbia.

Section 1983 made relief—in the form of monetary damages—available to those whose constitutional rights and laws had been violated by a person acting under State authority. Normally, constitutional rights and laws violations are remedied by specific performance including injunctions by the courts. Thus, if a person's right to due process was violated by a prison guard who was said to be acting under the authority of the state, under § 1983, that person could bring suit for monetary damages against the prison guard. Without § 1983, that person would have to seek an injunction by the courts for the due process violation. The problem with such an action by the court is that injunctions, which instruct a party on penalty of contempt to perform or refrain from performing some action, cannot apply to past harm, only future harm. So, essentially the person would have an actionable cause—the constitutional violation—with no adequate remedy. Most § 1983 claims are brought against prison officials by prisoners, but prisoner claims are usually dismissed as being without merit. Claims can be brought by anyone stating a proper cause of action.

Circumstances changed in 1961 when the Supreme Court of the United States articulated three purposes that underlie the statute: "1) 'to override certain kinds of state laws'; 2) to provide 'a remedy where state law was inadequate'; and 3) to provide 'a federal remedy where the state remedy, though adequate in theory, was not available in practice'." A § 1983 claim requires according to the United States Supreme Court in Adickes v. S. H. Kress & Co. (1970) two elements for recovery: (1) the plaintiff must prove that the defendant has deprived him of a right secured by the "constitution and laws" of the US, and (2) the plaintiff must show that the defendant deprived him of this constitutional right "under color of any statute, ordinance, regulation, custom, or usage, of any State or Territory" (under color of law).

Now the statute stands as one of the most powerful authorities with which state and federal courts may protect those whose rights are deprived. Section 1979 of the Revised Statutes (42 U.S.C. § 1983) provides a way individuals can sue to redress when their federally protected rights are violated, like the First Amendment rights and the Due Process Clause and the Equal Protection Clause of the Fourteenth Amendment. Section 1979 can be used to redress violated rights based on the federal Constitution and federal statutes, such as the prohibition of public sector employment discrimination based on race, color, national origin, sex, and religion.

== Section 2 (42 USC § 1985) ==
Targeted directly at the Klan and containing some two dozen clauses, Section 2 was longer than Section 1 and received more attention from Congress during debates. It prohibited conspiracies to overthrow the federal government, levy war against the United States, steal federal property, and a number of other acts.

Section 2 originally provided for both criminal and civil liability, but the criminal component was later found unconstitutional by the Supreme Court in the 1883 case United States v. Harris, and ultimately repealed by Congress. The civil liability portion of Section 2 survived with amendments later codified at 42 U.S.C. § 1985, known as "Section 1985". Section 1985 authorizes lawsuits against people who conspire to commit certain prohibited acts, such as interfering with government, obstructing justice, or depriving a person of equal protection under the law.

Section 1985(1) covers conspiracies to violently prevent a public official from taking office or to "molest, interrupt, hinder, or impede" the discharge of official duties, among other acts. Section 1985(2) addresses conspiracies to harm or threaten witnesses and jurors in federal courts, or to otherwise interfere with court proceedings, "with intent to deny to any citizen the equal protection of the laws".

In a reference to the Klan's practice of wearing face-covering hoods, Section 1985(3) prohibits two or more people from traveling in disguise or otherwise conspiring to deprive a person or class of people of equal protection of the law or other legal rights. In addition, Section 1985(3) contains the "support-or-advocacy clauses", which cover conspiracies to harm citizens because of their support or advocacy for a federal candidate for public office.

== Section 6 (42 USC § 1986) ==
Section 6 of the act, now codified at 42 U.S.C. § 1986 and known as "Section 1986", imposes civil liability upon persons who know of a violation of Section 1985 or a planned violation of Section 1985, and who are in a position to prevent it, but who fail to prevent it, fail to attempt to prevent it, or fail to assist in its prevention. While the other sections create a remedy against conspirators who deprived people of their rights, Section 1986 creates a remedy against persons whose acquiescence make such conspiracies possible. Legislators recognized that the Klan's political violence could not continue without tacit approval from local community leaders, and sought to stop the Klan by making community leaders financially responsible for terrorist acts they knowingly fail to prevent. This section of the act has been rarely invoked since its enactment, but is used to combat terrorism in modern times by providing a "disincentive to those who would protect or foster conspiratorial terrorist acts".

== Other provisions ==
Section 3 authorized the president to use the military to suppress domestic violence and conspiracies to deprive people of their constitutional rights.

Section 4 authorized the president to suspend the writ of habeas corpus to suppress a rebellion. This section expired after one year.

Section 5 barred persons violating the act from sitting as jurors in any proceeding under the act, and imposed an oath upon jurors not to violate the act.

Section 7 provided, "nothing herein contained shall be construed to supersede or repeal any former act or law except so far as the same may be repugnant thereto", and that prosecutions "shall be continued and completed, the same as if this act had not been passed, except so far as the provisions of this act may go to sustain and validate such proceedings".

== Jurisprudence ==
Although some provisions were ruled unconstitutional in 1883, the 1870 Force Act and the 1871 Civil Rights Act have been invoked in later civil rights conflicts, including the 1964 murders of Chaney, Goodman, and Schwerner; the 1965 murder of Viola Liuzzo; and in Bray v. Alexandria Women's Health Clinic, 506 U.S. 263 (1993), in which the court ruled that "The first clause of 1985(3) does not provide a federal cause of action against persons obstructing access to abortion clinics."

It was also used in the 1969 case of Tinker v. Des Moines. By the time Beth Tinker was in school, the law had expanded to make school boards liable if they stood in the way of people's federally protected rights.

Today, the 1871 Civil Rights Act can be invoked whenever a state actor violates a federally guaranteed right. The most common use today is to redress violations of the Fourth Amendment's protection against unreasonable search and seizure. Such lawsuits concern false arrest and police brutality, most notably in the Rodney King case. The rise of the Black Lives Matter movement along with smart phone video cameras have made Section 1983 lawsuits easier to obtain because of technological advances, including bodycams worn by law enforcement.

The act was invoked in the 2010 Robbins v. Lower Merion School District case, where plaintiffs charged two suburban Philadelphia high schools secretly spied on students by surreptitiously and remotely activating webcams embedded in school-issued laptops the students were using at home, violating their right to privacy. The schools admitted to snapping over 66,000 webshots and screenshots secretly, including webcam shots of students in their bedrooms.

The 2019 Supreme Court case Nieves v. Bartlett ruled that in general when probable cause for an arrest exists it overrides a First Amendment retaliatory arrest claim arising under section 1983, but that there are some narrow exceptions to this. Because officers can exercise their discretion in making arrests for warrantless misdemeanor crimes, a plaintiff can succeed on a section 1983 claim if they can present objective evidence that other similarly situated individuals who were not engaged in protected speech had not been arrested.

Also in 2019, the Court held that the 3-year statute of limitations for a fabrication of evidence civil lawsuit under section 1983 of the Civil Rights Act begins to run when the criminal case ends in the plaintiff's favor.

On February 16, 2021, the act was asserted in an action in the District Court, D.C., by Rep. Bennie G. Thompson (D, MS2), chair of the House Homeland Security Committee (in his personal capacity) against former President Donald Trump (in his personal capacity), Trump's attorney Rudolph Giuliani and (far-right "militia" groups) Proud Boys and Oath Keepers.

The Thompson v. Trump., et al. case was followed by a subsequent action filed August 26, 2021, by seven Capitol Police officers, reportedly against the same defendants.

== See also ==
- Antebellum South Carolina
- Kirk–Holden war, an 1870 struggle against the Klan in North Carolina
