= Lawson (surname) =

Lawson is a Scots-English surname.

== People ==
=== A ===
- Abercrombie Lawson (1870–1927), Canadian-born professor of botany in Australia
- Adelaide Lawson (1889–1986), American artist
- Al Lawson (born 1948), American politician
- Alex Lawson (born 1994), American tennis player
- Alfred Lawson (1869–1954), British-born American aviator, aviation entrepreneur and utopian philosopher
- Andrew Lawson (disambiguation)

=== B ===
- Ben Lawson (born 1980), Australian actor
- Bianca Lawson (born 1979), American actress
- Bob Lawson (1875–1952), American baseball pitcher

=== C ===
- Carl Lawson (American football) (born 1995), American football player
- Cecil Gordon Lawson (1849–1882), English landscape painter
- Cecil Lawson (born 1944), Jamaican cricketer
- Charles Lawson (born 1959), Northern Irish actor
- Charles Lawson (died 1929), American sharecropper who murdered his wife and six of their seven children
- Charles Lawson (nurseryman) (1795–1873), Scottish nurseryman and merchant, Lord Provost of Edinburgh

=== D ===
- Dedric Lawson (born 1997), American basketball player
- Denis Lawson (born 1947), Scottish actor
- Denis Lawson (footballer) (1897–1968), Scottish footballer
- Deontae Lawson (born 2003), American football player
- Dillon Lawson (born 1985), American baseball coach
- Dominic Lawson (born 1956), British journalist, brother of Nigella, son of Nigel
- Dorothy Lawson (recusant) (1580–1632), English noblewoman, recusant and Catholic priest harbourer
- Dorothy Lawson, Canadian cellist and composer

=== E ===
- E. Thomas Lawson (born 1931), British cognitive scientist
- Earl Lawson (politician) (1891–1950), Canadian politician and lawyer
- Eddie Lawson (born 1958), American motorcycle racer
- Edward Lawson (disambiguation)
- Ellie Lawson, British singer-songwriter

=== F ===
- Fenwick Lawson, (1932–2026), British sculptor

=== G ===
- Gaines Lawson (1840–1906), American Civil War Medal of Honor recipient
- Geoff Lawson (cricketer) (born 1957), Australian cricketer
- Geoff Lawson (designer) (1944–1999), British car designer
- George Lawson (disambiguation)

=== H ===
- H. Blaine Lawson (born 1942), American mathematician
- Harry Lawson (disambiguation)
- Henry Lawson (disambiguation)

=== I ===
- Isaac Lawson (died 1747), Scottish physician, friend of Linnaeus
- Iver Lawson (cyclist) (1879–1960), American track cyclist
- Iver Lawson (publisher) (1821–1871), American real estate investor and newspaper publisher

=== J ===
- Jack Lawson (1881–1965), British trade unionist and Labour politician
- Jahiem Lawson (born 2004), American football player
- James Lawson (disambiguation)
- Janez Lawson (1930–1990), American chemical engineer
- Jayme Lawson (born 1997), American actress
- Jeff Lawson (footballer) (born 1944), Australian rules footballer
- Jeff Lawson, co-founder and CEO of twilio
- Jeff Lawson, co-founder of distributed.net
- Jermaine Lawson (born 1982), West Indian Test cricketer
- Jerry Lawson (engineer) (1940–2011), American electronic engineer
- Jerry Lawson (musician) (1944–2019), American singer and music producer
- Jerry Lawson (runner) (born 1966), American long-distance runner
- Jim Lawson (American football) (1902–1989), college and professional football player
- Jim Lawson (comics) (born 1960), American comic book artist
- Jim Lawson (sports executive), Canadian businessman and lawyer, twice interim Commissioner of the Canadian Football League
- Jimmy Lawson (English footballer) (born 1947)
- Jimmy Lawson (Scottish footballer) (1886–1962), later a golfer in the United States
- Joan Lawson (1907–2002), English ballet dancer and writer
- John Lawson (disambiguation)
- Jordan Lawson, actor and musician from The Flys (US band)
- Joseph Lawson (cricketer) (1893–1969), English cricketer who played one first-class match for Gloucestershire
- Joseph Lawson (trainer) (1881–1964), British racehorse trainer
- Joseph William Lawson (1844–1920), English organist and composer

=== K ===
- Kara Lawson (born 1981), American basketball player and television analyst, assistant coach for the Boston Celtics
- Ken Lawson (born 1976), American actor
- Kenneth Lawson (artist) (1920–2008), English artist and set designer
- Kenneth Lawson (born 1963), American law professor and former lawyer

=== L ===
- Len Lawson (1927–2003), Australian comic book creator, rapist and murderer
- Liam Lawson (born 2002), New Zealand racing driver
- Louisa Lawson (1848–1920), Australian poet, writer, publisher, suffragist and feminist, mother of Henry Lawson
- Louise Lawson (1860s–1899), American sculptor
- Louise M. Lawson (1855–1951), American temperance activist

=== M ===
- Maggie Lawson (born 1980), American actress
- Mark Lawson, British journalist, broadcaster and author
- Marmaduke Alexander Lawson (1840–1896), British botanist

=== N ===
- Neal Lawson (born 1963), British political commentator and writer
- Nigel Lawson (1932–2023), British politician and Chancellor of the Exchequer
- Nigella Lawson (born 1960), British writer and cook
- Noel Lawson (1912–1974), New Zealand cricketer, sports administrator and radio commentator

=== P ===
- Patricia Lawson (1929–2019), Canadian multi-sport athlete and coach
- Paul Lawson (disambiguation)
- Peter Lawson (cricketer) (born 1981), English cricketer
- Peter Lawson (politician) (1821–1911), Canadian Member of Parliament

=== R ===
- Ray Lawson (1886–1980), Canadian industrialist, Lieutenant Governor of Ontario
- Robert Lawson (disambiguation)

=== S ===
- Shaq Lawson (born 1994), American football player
- Shayla Lawson, American writer and poet
- Sylvia Lawson (1932–2017), Australian journalist, academic and author

=== T ===
- Theresa Lawson (1951–2014), Australian embezzler
- Thomas Lawson (disambiguation)
- Timothy Lawson (1943–2026), British hockey player
- Todd Lawson, professor of Islamic thought
- Tom Lawson (ice hockey) (born 1979), Canadian ice hockey player
- Ty Lawson (born 1987), American professional basketball player

=== V ===
- Valarie Lawson (born 1966), American politician

=== W ===
- W. R. Lawson (1840–1922), British journalist, economics writer
- Will Lawson (1876–1957), Australian writer and poet
- William Lawson (disambiguation)

== Fictional characters ==
- Eddie Lawson (Waterloo Road), in the television series Waterloo Road
- Lawson (Breaking Bad), in the television series Breaking Bad
- The Lawson family (Ted, Joan, Vicki, Jamie), in the television series Small Wonder
- The Lawson family in the Australian radio serial The Lawsons

== See also ==
- Attorney General Lawson (disambiguation)
- General Lawson (disambiguation)
- Judge Lawson (disambiguation)
- Lawson (disambiguation)
- Lawson (given name)
- Senator Lawson (disambiguation)
