= John Lawson =

John Lawson may refer to:

== Military ==
- John Lawson (Royal Navy officer) (c. 1615–1665), English naval officer and republican
- John Lawson (Medal of Honor) (1837–1919), American Civil War Union Navy sailor
- John K. Lawson (1886–1941), senior Canadian officer during the Battle of Hong Kong, World War II

== Politics ==
- John D. Lawson (politician) (1816–1896), U.S. Representative from New York
- John W. Lawson (1837–1905), U.S. Representative from Virginia
- Sir John Lawson, 1st Baronet, of Knavesmire Lodge (1856–1919), British Unionist politician
- John Lawson (Australian politician) (1897–1956)

== Sports ==
- John Lawson (cyclist) (1872–1902), Swedish cycling champion
- John Lawson (baseball) (1887–1964), American baseball player
- Ivor Lawson (John Ballantyne Lawson, 1883–1958), Australian rules footballer for Collingwood, St Kilda and Richmond
- John Lawson (footballer) (1925–1990), English footballer
- John Lawson (runner) (born 1943), American middle- and long-distance runner, 1965 and 1966 NCAA runner-up for the Kansas Jayhawks track and field team

== Others ==
- John Lawson (explorer) (1674–1711), English explorer in colony of North Carolina
- John Lawson (theologian) (1709–1759), Irish academic
- John Parker Lawson (died 1852), clergyman of the Episcopal Church of Scotland and historian
- John Lawson (actor) (1865–1920), English actor known as "Humanity" Lawson
- John Howard Lawson (1894–1977), American writer
- John R. Lawson (died 1945), Colorado union leader
- John Lawson (children's author) (1923–1993), also known as John S. "Jack" Lawson, of New York and Virginia
- John D. Lawson (scientist) (1923–2008), British engineer and physicist
- John K. Lawson (artist) (born 1962), British-American artist

== See also ==
- Jack Lawson (1881–1965), British trade unionist and Labour politician
- Jack Lawson (Blue Heelers), a character from the Australian TV series Blue Heelers
