= Joseph Lawson =

Joseph Lawson may refer to:

- Joseph Lawson (cricketer) (1893–1969), English cricketer who played one first-class match for Gloucestershire
- Joseph Lawson (trainer) (1881–1964), British racehorse trainer
- Joseph William Lawson (1844–1920), English organist and composer

== See also ==
- Joe Lawson (disambiguation)
