= Murrell =

Murrell may refer to:

== Surname ==
- Adrian Murrell (born 1970), American football player
- Bryan Murrell (born 1955), English former rugby league footballer
- Chris Murrell (1956–2017), American jazz and gospel singer
- Christine Mary Murrell (1874–1933), English medical doctor
- Frank Murrell (1874–1931), British businessman and politician
- Helen Murrell, Australian lawyer, judge and Chief Justice of the Supreme Court of the Australian Capital Territory (2013–2022)
- Hilda Murrell (1906–1984), English naturalist and campaigner against nuclear energy
- Ivan Murrell (1943–2006), American baseball player
- Jack Murrell (1901–1980), Australian rules footballer
- Jaime Murrell (1949–2021), Panamanian musician
- Janie and Jerry Murrell, cofounders of the Five Guys American fast food chain
- James Murrell (c. 1785–1860), English cunning man (professional folk magician)
- Joe Murrell (1879–1952), English cricketer
- John Murrell (bandit) (1806–1844), American river bandit
- John Murrell (chemist) (1932–2016), British theoretical chemist
- John Murrell (playwright) (1945–2019), American-born Canadian playwright
- Jordan Murrell (born 1993), Canadian soccer player
- Marques Murrell (born 1985), American football player
- Peter Murrell (born 1964), Scottish former chief executive of the Scottish National Party and convicted fraudster
- Red Murrell (1921–2001), American western swing musician
- Red Murrell (basketball) (1933–2017), American basketball player
- Scott Murrell (born 1985), English rugby league player
- Sharon Murrell (born 1946), Canadian politician
- William Murrell (physician), English physician, clinical pharmacologist and toxicologist
- William Murrell (politician, died 1892), American state legislator
- William Murrell Jr. (1845–1932), American state legislator
- William McKendree Murrell (1854–1935), American politician and lawyer from Virginia
- Willie Murrell (1941–2018), American basketball player

== Given name ==
- Murrell Hogue (1904–1990), American football player
- Murrell Smith Jr. (born 1968), American politician

== See also ==
- Murrells, a surname
- Murrill, a surname
