= William Murrell =

William Murrell may refer to:

- William Murrell (physician) (1853–1912), English physician, clinical pharmacologist, and toxicologist
- William Murrell (politician, died 1892), state legislator in Louisiana
- William Murrell Jr. (1845–1932), state legislator in Louisiana
- William McKendree Murrell (1854–1935), American politician, member of the Virginia House of Delegates
- Bill Murrell (born 1956), American football player

== See also ==
- Willie Murrell (1941–2018), American basketball player
- William Murrill (1869–1957), American mycologist
