= General Lawson =

General Lawson may refer to:

- Henry Merrick Lawson (1859–1933), British Army lieutenant general
- Laurin Leonard Lawson (1876–1938), U.S. Army brigadier general
- Richard Lawson (British Army officer) (born 1927), British Army general
- Richard L. Lawson (1929–2020), U.S. Air Force four-star general
- Robert Lawson (American general) (1748–1805), Virginia Militia brigadier general in the American Revolutionary War
- Robert Lawson (British Army officer) (died 1816), British Army lieutenant general
- Thomas Lawson (military physician) (1789–1861), U.S. Army brevet brigadier general
- Thomas J. Lawson (born 1957), Royal Canadian Air Force general
- Edward Lawson, 4th Baron Burnham (1890–1963), British newspaper Territorial Army major general

== See also ==
- Attorney General Lawson (disambiguation)
