= Alfred Lawson (disambiguation) =

Alfred Lawson (1869–1954) was a baseball player and manager and later a figure in the early aviation industry.

Alfred Lawson may also refer to:

- Al Lawson (born 1948), Florida politician
- Alfred Lawson (cricketer) (1912–1974), New Zealand cricketer
