= James Lawson =

Jim, Jimmy, Jamie, or James Lawson may refer to:

== Academics ==
- James L. Lawson (1915–1982), American physicist and radar engineer
- James Raymond Lawson (1915–1996), African-American physicist and president of Fisk University
- James Lawson (activist) (1928–2024), American professor, civil rights scholar and pastor

== Public officials ==
- James Lawson, Lord Lawson (before 1500—after 1532), Scottish Senator of College of Justice and Provost of Edinburgh
- James Anthony Lawson (1817–1887), Irish MP, Solicitor-General and Attorney-General
- James M. Lawson (1847–1916), member of the Virginia House of Delegates
- James Marshall Lawson (1863–1922), American Republican state legislator in South Dakota
- Earl Lawson (politician) (James Earl Lawson, 1891–1950), Canadian MP from Ontario

== Sportsmen ==
- Jimmy Lawson (Scottish footballer) (1886–1962), right back (Dundee FC), golfer in U.S.
- Jim Lawson (American football) (1902–1989), end and placekicker
- Jimmy Lawson (English footballer) (born 1947), winger and player-manager
- Jim Lawson (sports executive) (born 1958), Canadian ice hockey centre, businessman and lawyer
- Jamie Lawson (American football) (born 1965), NFL fullback
- Jamie Lawson (Australian footballer) (born 1971), rover with Sydney Swans
- James Lawson (footballer) (born 1987), English winger and striker
- James Lawson (swimmer) (born 1995), Zimbabwean at 2017 World Aquatics Championships

== Writers ==
- James Lawson (minister) (1538–1584) Church of Scotland biographer of John Knox
- James Lawson Drummond (1783–1853), Irish physician, naturalist and botanical writer
- James Gilchrist Lawson (1874–1946), British Christian author and compiler
- James Rupert Lawson (1918–1985), American anti-Imperialist activist and black nationalist writer
- James Lawson (Australian doctor) (born 1934), breast cancer researcher and author
- Jim Lawson (comics) (born 1960), American comic book writer and artist
- Jamie Lawson (musician) (born 1975), English singer-songwriter and musician
  - Jamie Lawson (album), Lawson's 2015 self-titled album

== See also ==
- James and Mary Lawson House, American 1869 historic structure in Woodstown, New Jersey
