= Thomas Lawson =

Thomas Lawson or Tom Lawson may refer to:

- Thomas Lawson (botanist) (1630–1691), English botanist and Quaker
- Thomas Lawson (military physician) (1789–1861), American military physician
- Thomas B. Lawson (1807–1888), American painter
- Thomas George Lawson (born 1814), Popo prince from what is now Togo who served in the senior civil service of Sierra Leone
- Thomas G. Lawson (1835–1912), U.S. representative from Georgia
- Thomas W. Lawson (businessman) (1857–1925), American businessman and author
- E. Thomas Lawson (born 1931), research scientist at the Institute of Cognition and Culture at Queen's University Belfast
- Thomas Lawson (artist) (born 1951), artist, writer and dean of California Institute of the Arts
- Thomas J. Lawson (born 1957), Chief of the Defence Staff of the Canadian Armed Forces
- Thomas Lawson (cricketer), English-born Scottish cricketer
- Thomas Lawson (rugby union), English rugby union player
- Tom Lawson (ice hockey) (born 1979), Canadian ice hockey player
- Thomas R. Lawson, RPI Grand Marshal, 1897–1898
- Thomas Lawson, fullback for the 2007 Nebraska Cornhuskers football team
