= Peter Lawson =

Peter Lawson may refer to:

- Peter Lawson (politician) (1821–1911), Canadian politician from Ontario
- Peter Lawson (cricketer) (born 1981), English cricket player

== See also ==
- Peter Lawson Jones (born 1952), American politician and actor
