= Ralph Morgan (disambiguation) =

Ralph Morgan (1883–1956) was an American film, stage and character actor.

Ralph Morgan may also refer to:

- Ralph Morgan (basketball) (1884–1965), American basketball administrator
- Ralph Morgan (rugby) (died 2009), Welsh rugby union and rugby league footballer
- Ralph Thompson Morgan (1876–1949), English organist and author
