= Robert Lawson =

Robert Lawson may refer to:

- Robert Lawson (architect) (1833–1902), Scottish architect who emigrated to New Zealand
- Robert Lawson (author) (1892–1957), American author and illustrator, best known for his work in children's literature
- Robert Lawson (British Army officer) (died 1816), Royal Artillery officer
- Robert Lawson (cricketer) (1901–1974), Australian cricketer
- Robert Lawson (racing driver), runner-up in the 2008 SEAT Cupra Championship
- Robert Lawson (screenwriter), screenwriter of What Goes Up
- Robert Lawson (South Australian politician) (born 1944), Liberal member of the South Australian Legislative Council
- Robert Lawson (Victorian politician) (1927–2024), Liberal member of the Victorian Legislative Council
- Robert Lawson (American general) (1748–1805), American Revolutionary War militia general and politician
- Robert C. Lawson (1883–1961), American clergyman, founder of the Church of Our Lord Jesus Christ
- Robert G. Lawson (born 1938), American law professor at the University of Kentucky College of Law
- Robert R. Lawson (c. 1872–1934), New York state senator
- Robert W. Lawson (c. 1889–1960), British physicist
- Bob Lawson (Robert Baker Lawson, 1875–1952), baseball player
