= R. Palmer Hunter =

American politician

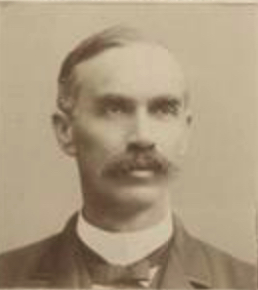

Member of the Virginia House of Delegates for Campbell and Lynchburg
- In office December 2, 1891 – December 6, 1893 Serving with James M. Lawson
- Preceded by: J. Sidney Peters
- Succeeded by: William McKendree Murrell
- In office December 8, 1887 – December 4, 1889 Serving with John Jay Terrell
- Preceded by: James M. Lawson
- Succeeded by: James F. Butler

Personal details
- Born: Robert Palmer Hunter; September 29, 1846
- Died: April 5, 1925 (aged 78)
- Party: Democratic

Robert Palmer Hunter (September 29, 1846 – April 5, 1925) was an American politician who served in the Virginia House of Delegates.
