= Cornelius Bryan =

English organist and composer

Cornelius Bryan (1775 - 18 March 1840) was an English organist and composer.

== Background ==
He was born in Bristol around 1775.

He died on 18 March 1840 when he fell through a trap in the stage of the Bristol theatre, during a rehearsal of his opera “Lundy”.

== Appointments ==
- Organist at St. Mark’s Church, Bristol
- Organist at St Mary Redcliffe, Bristol 1818 - 1840

== Compositions ==
He composed

- an opera Lundy.
- Effusion in F for organ

Cultural offices
Preceded by John Allen	Organist of St Mary Redcliffe; 1818 - 1840	Succeeded by Edwin Hobhouse Sircom
