= Edwin Hobhouse Sircom =

English organist and composer

Edwin Hobhouse Sircom (1815 – 9 December 1893) was an English organist and composer.

== Background ==
He was born in 1815, the second son of John Sircom and Jane Freeman Lewis.

He married Ann Ford, daughter of James Groom Ford, on 5 April 1842. They had the following children:

- Sebastian Ford Sircom (1844 – 1934)
- Edwin Sircom (b. 1845)
- Emily Fanny Sircom (b. 4 Feb 1848)
- Agnes Maria Sircom (b. 11 Mar 1851)
- Felix Mendelssohn Sircom (b. 1 Nov 1851)
- George Henry Sircom (b. 15 Mar 1853)
- Louis William Crossman Sircom (b. 1856)

== Appointments ==
- Organist at St Mary Redcliffe, Bristol 1840 – 1855
- Organist at St. Mary's Catholic Church on the Quay, Bristol 1859 - ????
- Organist at St. James' Church, Bristol 1863 - ????
- Organist at Stonyhurst College

== Compositions ==
He composed accompaniments for Vespers.

Cultural offices
Preceded by Cornelius Bryan	Organist of St Mary Redcliffe; 1840 - 1855	Succeeded by William Haydn Flood
