= Murrills =

Murrills is an English surname. Notable people with this surname include:

- Adam Murrills (born 1990), English squash player
- Timothy Murrills (born 1953), English cricketer

== See also ==
- Murrill
