= Murrells =

Murrells is a surname. Notable people with the surname include:

- Frank Murrells (1902–2000), Australian footballer
- Steve Murrells (born 1965), British businessman, chief executive of The Co-operative Group

== Other ==
- Murrell (disambiguation)
- Murrells Inlet, South Carolina, US town
