= Henry Rupert Wilhoit Jr. =

American judge (1935–2022)

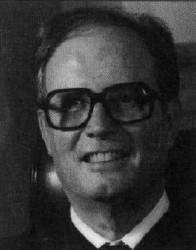
- Wilhoit, c. 1990

Senior Judge of the United States District Court for the Eastern District of Kentucky
- In office December 31, 2000 – September 12, 2022

Chief Judge of the United States District Court for the Eastern District of Kentucky
- In office 1998–2000
- Preceded by: William Bertelsman
- Succeeded by: Karl Spillman Forester

Judge of the United States District Court for the Eastern District of Kentucky
- In office September 28, 1981 – December 31, 2000
- Appointed by: Ronald Reagan
- Preceded by: Howard David Hermansdorfer
- Succeeded by: Karen K. Caldwell

Personal details
- Born: February 11, 1935 Ashland, Kentucky, U.S.
- Died: September 12, 2022 (aged 87) Grayson, Kentucky, U.S.
- Education: University of Kentucky College of Law (LLB)

Henry Rupert Wilhoit Jr. (February 11, 1935 – September 12, 2022) was a United States district judge of the United States District Court for the Eastern District of Kentucky.

== Education and career ==
Born in Ashland, Kentucky, Wilhoit received a Bachelor of Laws from the University of Kentucky College of Law in 1960. He was in private practice in Grayson, Kentucky from 1960 to 1981, serving as the city attorney for Grayson from 1962 to 1966, and was the county attorney of Carter County, Kentucky from 1966 to 1970.

== Federal judicial service ==
On August 11, 1981, Wilhoit was nominated by President Ronald Reagan to a seat on the United States District Court for the Eastern District of Kentucky vacated by Judge Howard David Hermansdorfer. Wilhoit was confirmed by the United States Senate on September 25, 1981, and received his commission on September 28, 1981. He served as chief judge from 1998 to 2000, assuming senior status on December 31, 2000.

Wilhoit died on September 12, 2022, at the age of 87.

== Sources ==
Legal offices
Preceded by Howard David Hermansdorfer	Judge of the United States District Court for the Eastern District of Kentucky; 1981–2000	Succeeded by Karen K. Caldwell
Preceded by William Bertelsman	Chief Judge of the United States District Court for the Eastern District of Kentucky; 1998–2000	Succeeded by Karl Spillman Forester
