= Henry Street High School =

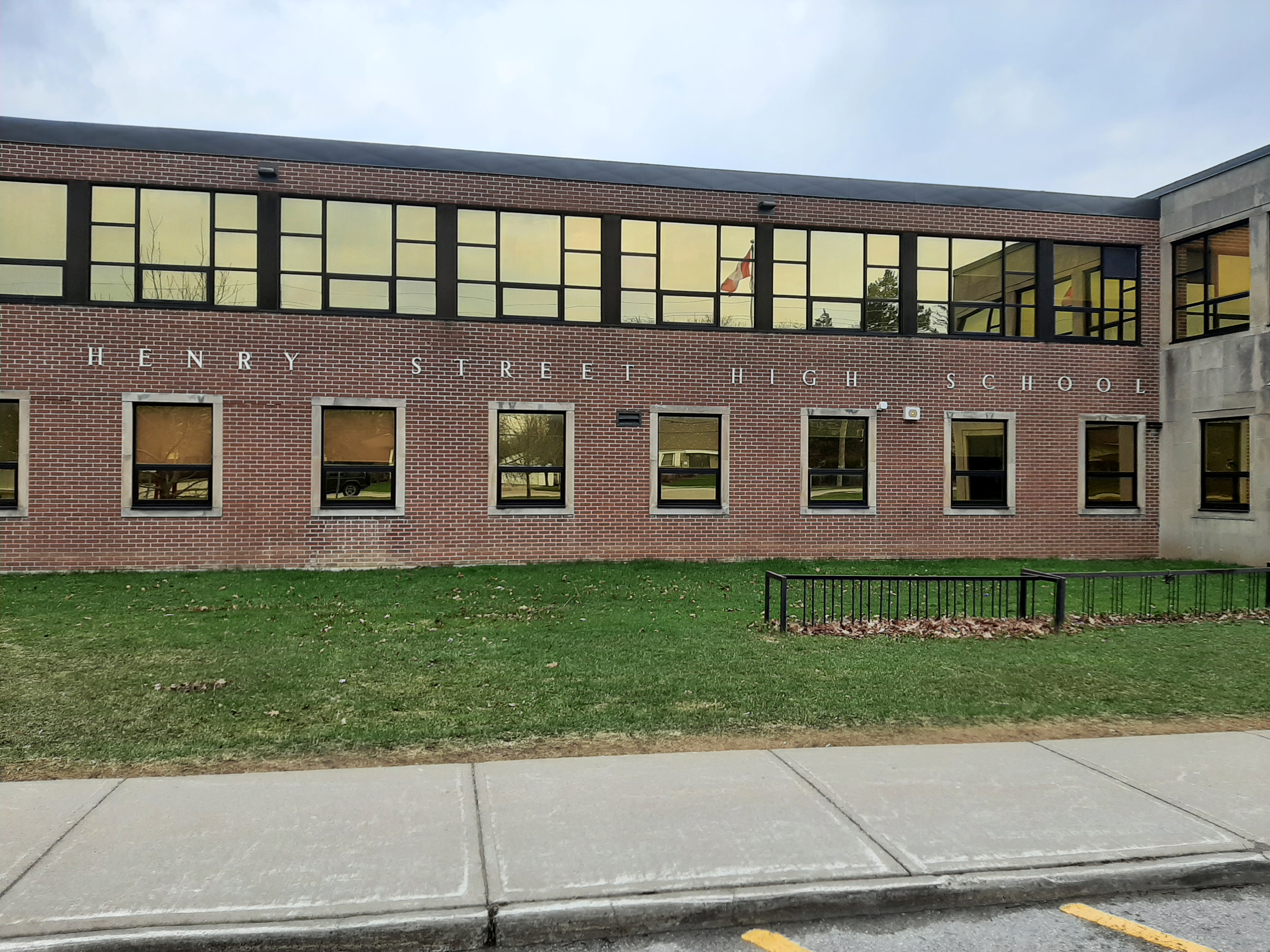
- Henry Street High School in 2025

Location
- 600 Henry Street; Whitby, Ontario, L1N 5C7; Canada; 43.87248°N 78.94545°W

Information
- Founded: 1954
- School board: Durham District School Board
- Principal: Basil Broumeriotis
- Grades: 9–12
- Enrolment: 810 (2019/2020)
- Language: English
- Colours: Purple and Gold
- Mascot: Hawk
- Rival: Anderson Collegiate Vocational Institute
- Website: henrystreeths.ddsb.ca/en/index.aspx#/

Henry Street High School is located in Whitby, Ontario, within the Durham District School Board. The school offers programs for students in grades 9–12 and a wide range of academic and extracurricular activities.

The school was originally known as "Whitby District High School"; the name was changed after the opening of Whitby's second high school, Anderson, in 1960. Henry Street's feeder elementary schools are Colonel J.E. Farewell Public School, E.A Fairman Public School, Sir William Stephenson Public School, Whitby Shores Public School and West Lynde Public School.

== Notable alumni ==
- Ryan Kellogg, baseball player
- Andrea Lawes, curler
- Tom Lawson, hockey player

== See also ==
- Education in Ontario
- List of secondary schools in Ontario
