= Joe Lawson =

Joe Lawson is the name of:

- Joe Lawson (writer) (born 1968), creator and writer of the GEICO Cavemen commercials
- Joe Lawson (politician) (1893–1973), Australian politician
- Joe Lawson (footballer) (born 1934), former Australian rules footballer

== See also ==
- Joseph Lawson (cricketer) (1893–1969), English cricketer
- Joseph Lawson (trainer) (1881–1964), English racehorse trainer
