= Cancer in the United Kingdom =

Health issue in the United Kingdom

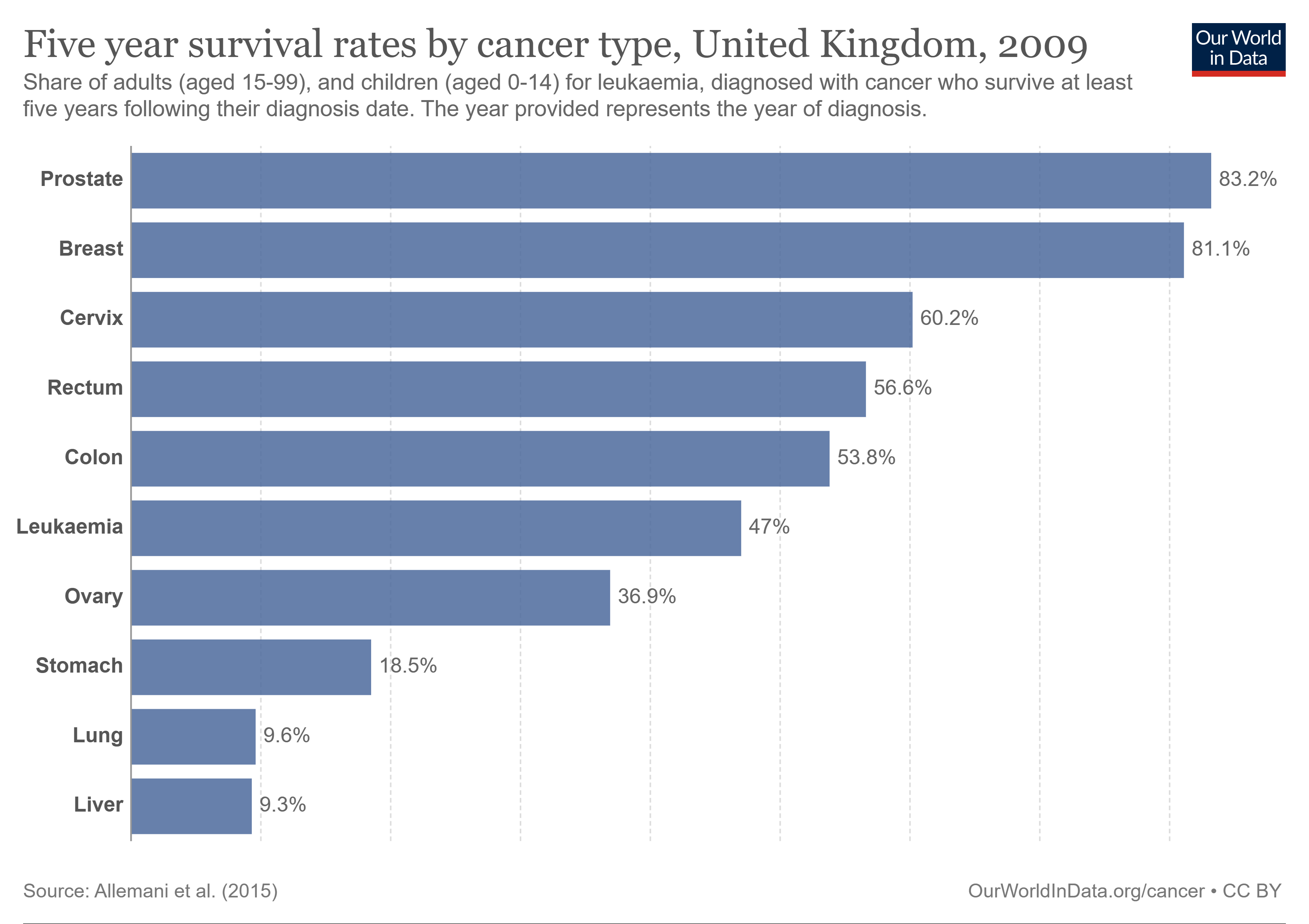
Five year survival rates of different cancer in the UK, 2009

The passing of the Cancer Act 1939 marked the political significance of cancer treatment. It envisaged a system of co-ordination of diagnosis and treatment under the control of County Councils and County Borough Councils which preceded the establishment of the National Health Service (NHS). The outbreak of war prevented most of its provisions from coming into effect.

== Types of cancer ==
=== Breast cancer ===
Breast cancer is the most common cancer in the UK (around 56,000 women and 375 men are diagnosed with the disease every year). It is the fourth most common cause of cancer death (around 11,400 women and 85 men die each year) and the second most common cause of death in women. As age and biological sex are the biggest risk factors, women over 50 are automatically invited to participate in the NHS Breast Screening Programme every three years. The screening programme was shown to reduce the number of deaths from breast cancer and produce only a modest number of overdiagnosis.

== Performance ==
There were 361,216 cancer diagnoses in 2014 in the United Kingdom. Cancer Research UK publishes detailed statistics of the incidence of and mortality from cancer in the UK. Cancer Research UK estimates that 15% of UK cancers are caused by smoking, and 3-4% of UK cancers are related to alcohol consumption. Treatment of cancer has been a recurring issue in the National Health Service. Official guidelines state that no one in England should have to wait more than 62 days for cancer treatment after a referral from their general practitioner. However, press reports in 2015 indicated that some patients had to wait longer. On 4 September 2015, the NHS announced it would no longer pay for 17 different cancer medications. The Telegraph reported that over 5,000 patients with breast, bowel, skin, and pancreatic cancers would be affected.

A five-year Cancer Strategy Implementation Plan was published by NHS England in 2015. It promises considerable investment in linear accelerators There have been some improvements in cancer care but too many patients are waiting too long for diagnosis and treatment. Sir Harpal Kumar criticised the government's child obesity strategy. He said the report was not tough enough on the food industry, given the number of cancers which are linked to lifestyle. The increased investment does not appear to be sufficient to meet the rise in the number of cancer patients, and there are shortages of radiologists, specialist nurses and other key staff.

=== Targets ===
National cancer waiting times standards were established by NHS England in 2009 (and the same targets have been set by NHS Scotland). In 2017 the targets are

- No more than 62 days wait between the date the hospital receives an urgent GP referral for suspected cancer and starting treatment
- Starting treatment no more than 31 days after the meeting at which you and your doctor agree the treatment plan

The targets are monitored monthly and in the period from 2014 to 2016 were only met in 4 months out of 36.

Sara Hiom of Cancer Research UK said, ‘The state of NHS diagnostic services is deeply concerning – and new GP referral guidelines from NICE mean that even more patients will be waiting for these tests. There aren’t enough trained staff, they're often reliant on outdated equipment and in many cases they're already operating services seven days a week.' Dr Giles Maskell of the Royal College of Radiologists said, ‘Well-resourced testing services are crucial to the early diagnosis of cancer, which in turn is vital to increase survival from the disease.' Cancer Research UK is calling on the government to provide funding for earlier diagnosis of cancer as prompt diagnosis increases the chances the patient will survive.

== See also ==
- British Journal of Cancer
- Category:Cancer organisations based in the United Kingdom
- Health in the United Kingdom
