= William Haydn Flood =

English organist and composer (1830–1908)

William Haydn Flood (1830 – 17 July 1908) was an English organist and composer, who moved to New Zealand.

== Life ==
Flood married twice. His first marriage was to Mary Ann Turner on 12 May 1856. He later married Anne Catherine Juliette Groube on 5 September 1865 in New Zealand.

He served in the 1st Regiment of Life Guards and was present at the funeral of the Duke of Wellington.

He moved to New Zealand in the early 1860s. In 1867 he was appointed conductor of the Wanganui Choral Society. He composed works for organ and choir.

His military career continued in New Zealand where he served with the Wanganui Cavalry in the New Zealand Wars.

He was declared bankrupt in 1885 and was later taken to court for failing to provide for his wife and his children.

He died on 17 July 1908 in Wellington, New Zealand.

== Appointments ==
- Organist at St Mary Redcliffe, Bristol 1855 – 1862
- Organist of St. Joseph's Church, Dunedin
- Organist of Christ Church, Wanganui
- Organist of St. Mary's Church, New Plymouth
- Organist of Holy Trinity Church, Gisborne, New Zealand 1884 -

Cultural offices
Preceded by Edwin Hobhouse Sircom	Organist of St Mary Redcliffe; 1855 - 1862	Succeeded by Joseph William Lawson
