= University of Kentucky Rosenberg College of Law =

Law school in Lexington, Kentucky, US

University of Kentucky J. David Rosenberg College of Law
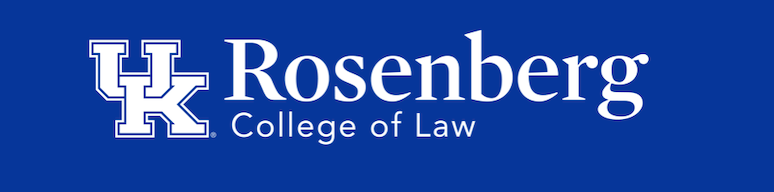
- Established: 1799; 227 years ago
- School type: Public
- Endowment: $2.1 billion (2021)
- Dean: Gregory F. Van Tatenhove
- Location: Lexington, Kentucky, U.S. 38.03665°N 84.50719°W
- Enrollment: 369 (approx.)
- USNWR ranking: 68th (tie) (2025)
- Website: law.uky.edu

The University of Kentucky J. David Rosenberg College of Law is the law school of the University of Kentucky located in Lexington, Kentucky. Founded initially from a law program at Transylvania University in 1799, the law program at UK began operations in 1908; it was one of the nation's first public law schools. In 1913, the college became the first in the nation to institute a trial practice program, and is host to the tenth-oldest student-run law review publication in the United States.

According to UK Law's official disclosures to the American Bar Association, nearly 90% of the Class of 2025 successfully obtained full-time, long-term, JD-required employment nine months after graduation, excluding solo practitioners. Per U.S. News & World Report, UK Law is the 67th best law school among all public and private universities in the nation, and the highest-ranked law school in the Commonwealth of Kentucky.

The University of Kentucky pass rate for the July 2021 Kentucky Bar Exam was 83%, 11% higher than the overall Kentucky pass rate. For first-time takers the pass rate was 83%, 6% higher than the overall first-time taker pass rate in Kentucky.

== Academics ==
The Rosenberg College of Law offers a three-year, full-time program leading to a Juris Doctor (J.D.) degree. Students in addition can choose to pursue their J.D. in conjunction with another graduate degree, such as a master's degree. The college offers a dual degree program that includes many different fields of study that includes: JD-MA, JD-MBA, JD/MHA (Master of Health Administration), and JD-MPA.

Required first-year courses for 1Ls are torts, criminal law, contracts, legal research and writing, constitutional law, civil procedure, and property. All first-year students are required to complete the historic 1L oral argument at the conclusion of their first year in their Legal Writing course acting as a hallmark event in each students legal career and their very first oral argument.

== History ==
The University of Kentucky College of Law began operations in 1908. It was housed in a structure now known as the Gillis Building from 1927 to 1936. In 1936, the college moved into the newly built Lafferty Hall. Lafferty Hall was named after William T. Lafferty, the first dean of the College of Law.

In 1913, the College of Law began publication of the Kentucky Law Journal. The KLJ is the tenth-oldest student-run law journal in continuous publication in America.

In 1925, the college was approved by the American Bar Association, and it was elected to the Order of the Coif in 1931.

The College of Law again relocated to its current building located on South Limestone in 1965. That building underwent a major renovation and expansion during 2017–2019, during which the building was taken down to its structural core and completely reconfigured.

On February 1, 2017, Chief Justice John G. Roberts, Jr. spoke at the College of Law and served as the first speaker of the judicial conference and speaker series hosted by UK Law as part of the Heyburn Initiative. Most recently, on Sept. 21, 2017, Justice Neil Gorsuch, Associate Justice of the Supreme Court of the United States spoke at UK Law and provided advice to UK Law students in small intimate groups. Serving as only the most recent U.S. Supreme Court Justice to speak at the College of Law, going back to 1989 UK Law hosted the sixth biennial Judge Mac Swinford Lecture where Supreme Court Justice Antonin Scalia delivered the lecture. The five prior notable speakers of that series at UK Law were Judge Robert Keeton (1980), U.S. Supreme Court Chief Justice William Rehnquist (1982), U.S. Supreme Court Justice Sandra Day O'Connor (1984), and Former U.S. Attorney General Griffin Bell (1986).

The college was renamed the J. David Rosenberg College of Law in 2019 after prominent Ohio corporate lawyer and alumnus J. David Rosenberg (J.D. '73), donated $20 million to the college. The gift was the third largest single donation in university history and earned him the name rights to the school, it also went toward further strengthening the academic excellence of the College of Law by supporting scholarships for outstanding students and efforts to recruit and retain world-class faculty.

=== Deans ===
No.	Image	Name	Tenure
1		William T. Lafferty	1908–1922
2		Charles J. Turck	1922–1928
3		Alvin E. Evans	1928–1933
4		Frank Hall Randall	1933–1935
5		Alvin E. Evans	1935–1949
6		Elvis J. Stahr	1949–1951
7		William Lewis Matthews Jr.	1951–1952
(Note: Acting dean)		Robert G. Lawson	1971–1973
8		George W. Hardy III	1973–1976
9		Thomas P. Lewis	1976–1981
10		Robert G. Lawson	1982–1988
11		Rutherford B. Campbell Jr.	
12		David E. Shipley	
-		Robert G. Schwemm	1998–1999
-		Eugene R. Gaetke	1999–2000
13		Allan W. Vestal	2000–2008
-		Louise E. Graham	2008–2009
14		David A. Brennen	2009–2020
15		Mary J. Davis	2020–2024 (Note: Interim dean 2020 to 2021)
-		Paul E. Salamanca	2024–2025
-		James C. Duff	2025–2026
16		Gregory F. Van Tatenhove	2026–present

== Law building ==
Constructed in 1965, the University of Kentucky College of Law Building houses the Alvin E. Evans Library, classrooms, and faculty offices.

The Alvin E. Evans Library is the largest law library in the Commonwealth and contains approximately 470,000 volumes, along with a vast array of electronic materials. It also provides access to all "U.S. reported court decisions, statutes and administrative materials" along with international materials.

A 2002 study suggested that if a new College of Law structure was to be constructed, it should relocate closer to downtown Lexington. The suggested site was a block or two north, on Scott Street near the College of Education. A plan for five structures and two courtyards was abandoned because of funding difficulties. Instead, the school decided to renovate and expand its current building, a $56 million project, with state bonds paying $35 million on the condition that tuition not go up as a result. The renovation and expansion was completed in 2019.

== Employment ==
According to University of Kentucky's official 2023 ABA-required disclosures, 86% of the Class of 2023 obtained full-time, long-term, JD-required employment nine months after graduation, excluding solo practitioners. University of Kentucky's Law School Transparency under-employment score is 2.3%, indicating the percentage of the Class of 2023 unemployed, pursuing an additional degree, or working in a non-professional, short-term, or part-time job nine months after graduation.

== Costs ==
The total cost of attendance (indicating the cost of tuition, fees, books and living expenses) at University of Kentucky for the 2024–2025 academic year is $52,318 for residents and $78,798 for non-residents.

== Notable alumni ==
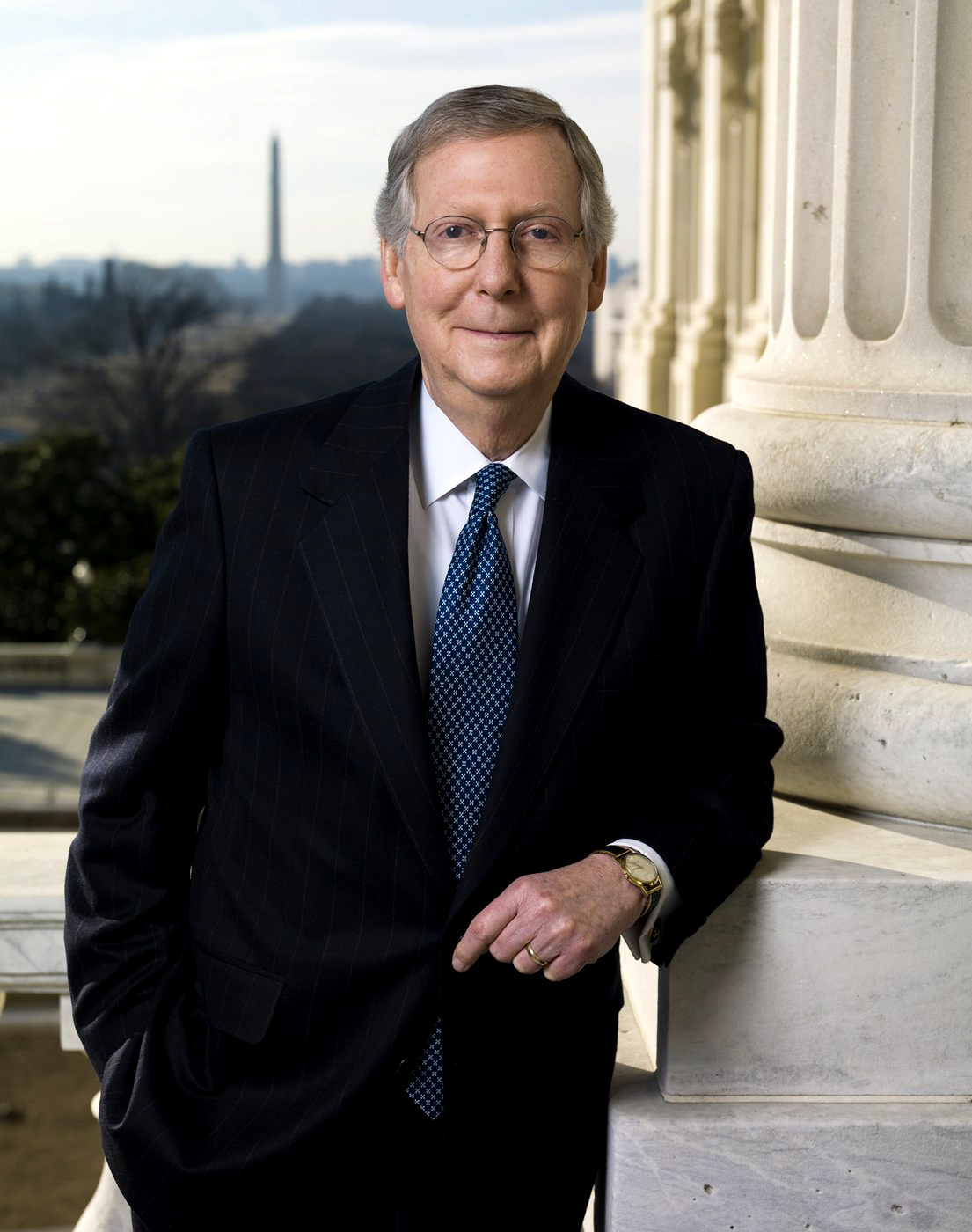
Mitch McConnell

- Andy Barr '01, U.S. Representative
- Steve Beshear '68, former Kentucky governor
- Edward T. Ned Breathitt '50, former Kentucky governor
- Stephen Bright '74, advocate and law school lecturer
- John Y. Brown Sr. '26, former U.S. Representative
- John Y. Brown, III '92, former Secretary of State of Kentucky
- David L. Bunning '91, U.S. District Judge
- Karen K. Caldwell '80, U.S. District Judge
- Albert B. "Happy" Chandler '24, former governor of Kentucky, U.S. Senator and Commissioner of Baseball
- Ben Chandler '86, U.S. Representative
- Jennifer B. Coffman '78, U.S. District Judge
- Bert T. Combs '37, former governor of Kentucky and Federal Judge
- Joe Craft '76, businessman and philanthropist
- Mike Duncan '74, chairman of the Republican National Committee
- Karl Spillman Forester '66, U.S. District Judge
- Joseph Robert Goeke '75, Senior Federal Judge
- John G. Heyburn II '76, U.S. District Judge
- Joseph Martin Hood '72, U.S. District Judge
- Fitz Johnson, '98, Georgia Public Service Commissioner
- James E. Keller '66, Justice of the Kentucky Supreme Court
- Robert G. Lawson '63, law professor
- Earl F. "Marty" Martin '87, president of Drake University
- Mitch McConnell '67, U.S. senator
- Morgan McGarvey, U.S. Representative
- Jim Newberry '81, former mayor of Lexington, Kentucky
- John C. Roach '92, former Justice of the Kentucky Supreme Court
- Timothy N. Philpot '77, former Kentucky state senator and family court circuit judge in Fayette Co.
- Mary C. Noble '81, former Justice of the Kentucky Supreme Court
- Hal Rogers '64, U.S. Representative
- Ernesto Scorsone '76, former Kentucky state senator and court circuit judge in Fayette Co.
- Aurelia Skipwith, '15, Director of the U.S. Fish and Wildlife Service
- Janet Stumbo '80, Justice of the Kentucky Supreme Court
- David Tandy '98, former member of the Louisville Metro Council
- Gregory Frederick Van Tatenhove '89, U.S. District Judge
- Ed Whitfield '69, U.S. Representative
- Henry Rupert Wilhoit, Jr. '60, U.S. District Judge

== Images ==
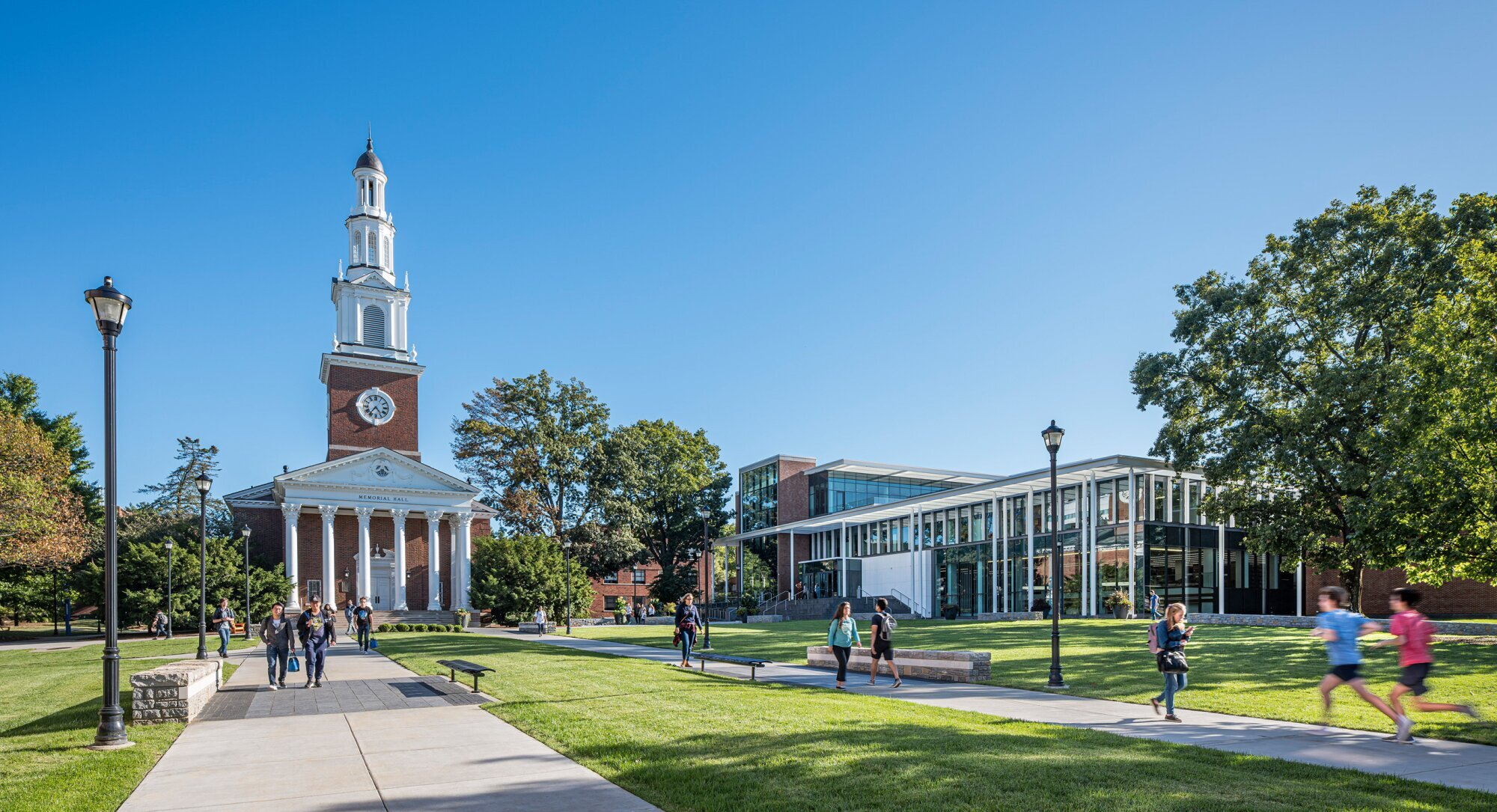
Entrance

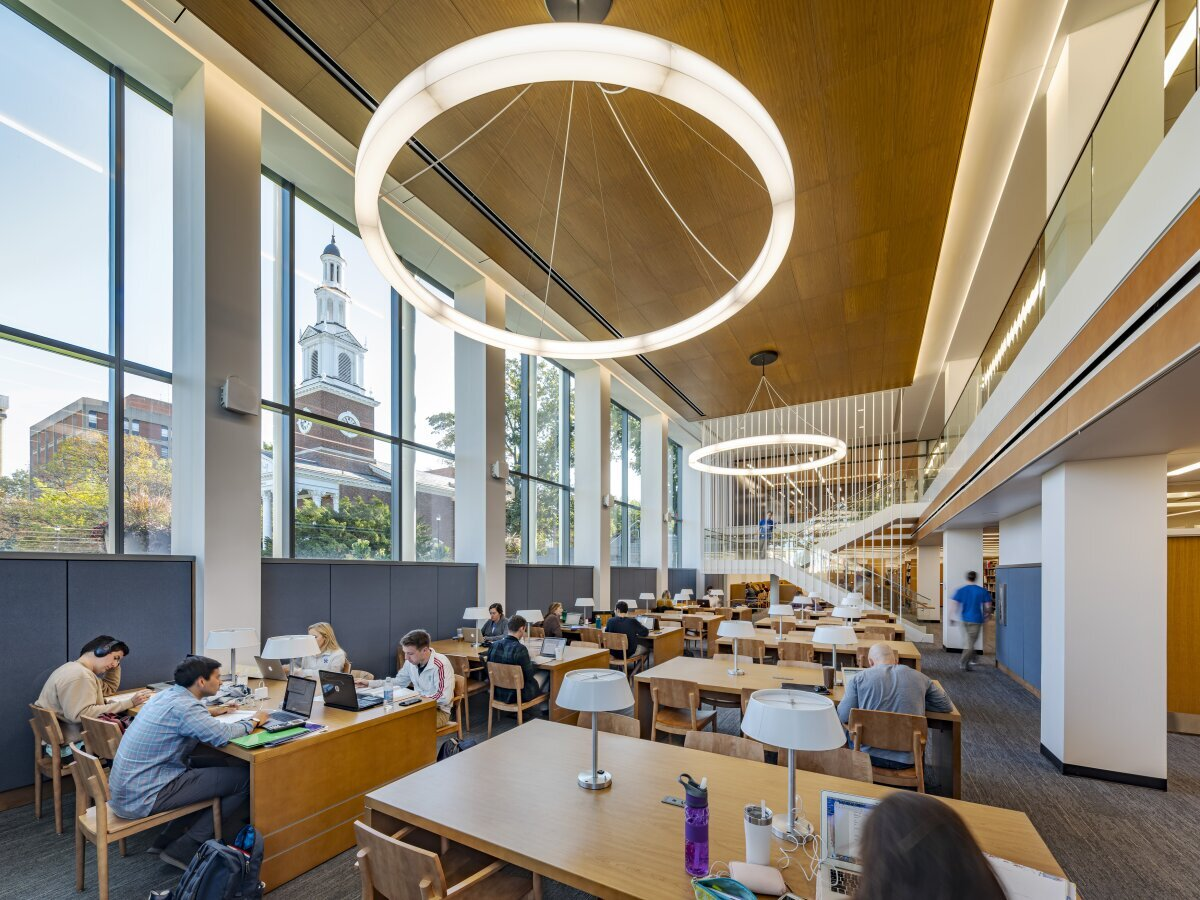
Law Library

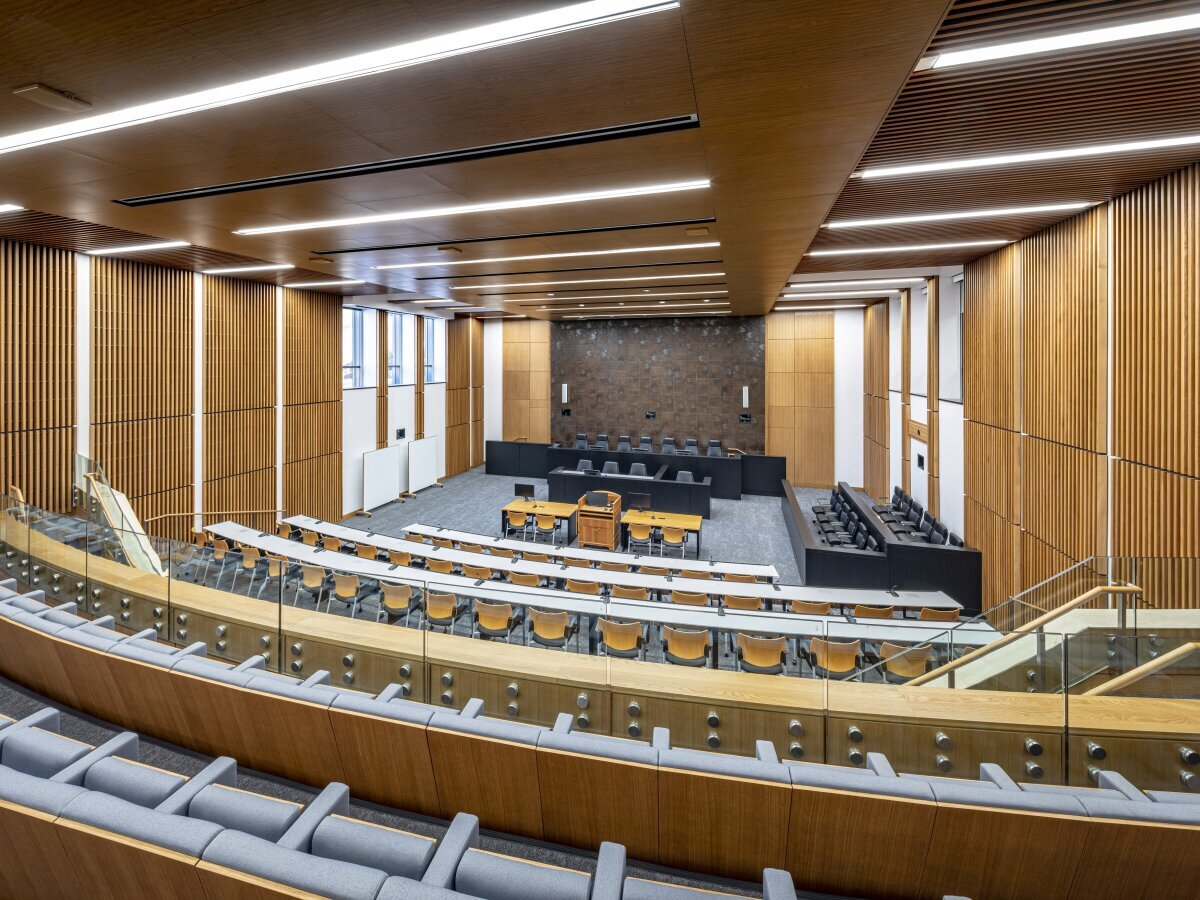
Judicial court room

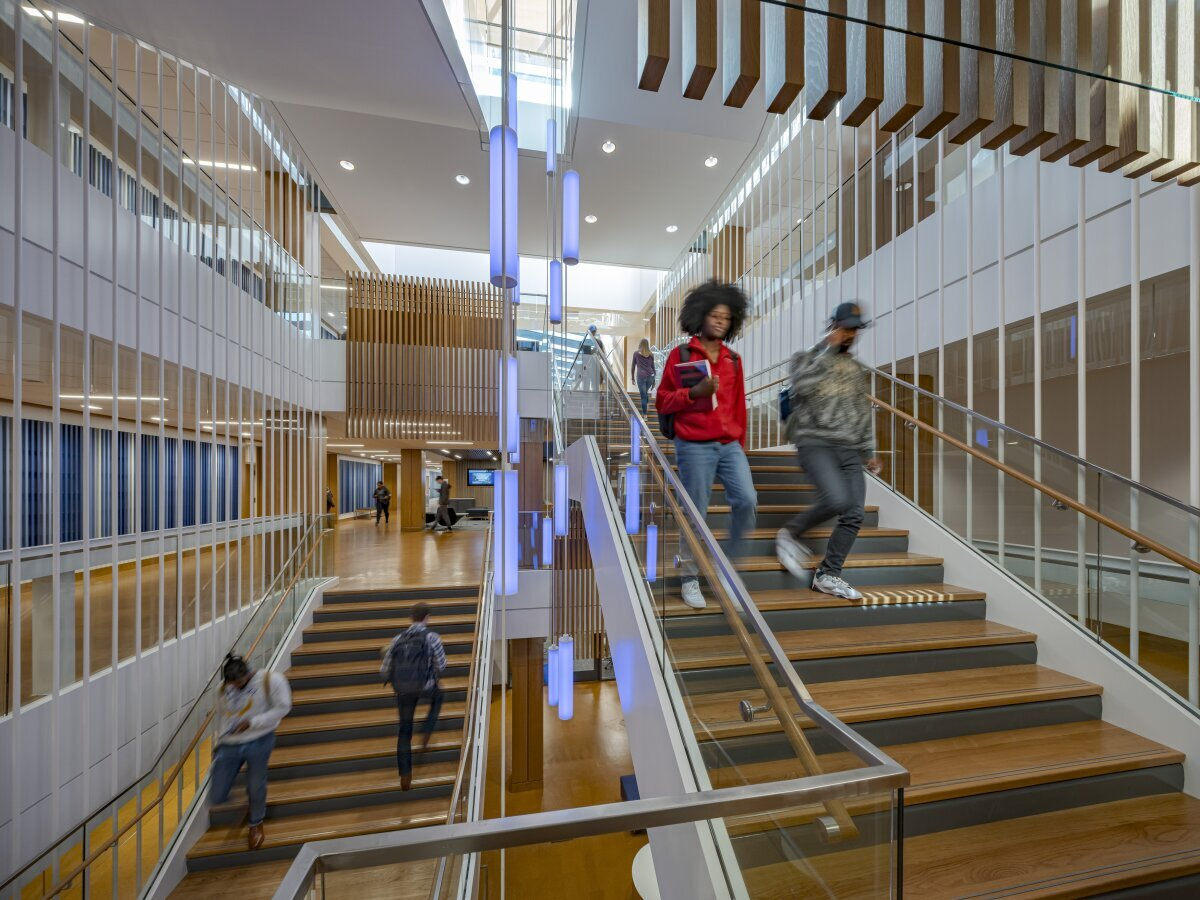
Main floor staircase

== See also ==
- Buildings at the University of Kentucky
