= James Lawson (Australian doctor) =

Australian public health doctor and scientist

Professor James "Jim" Sutherland Lawson
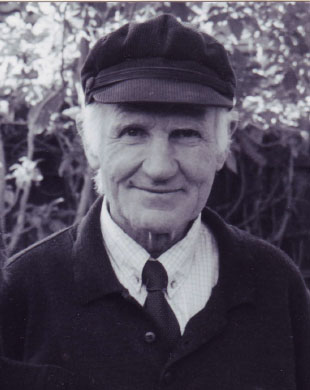
- James Lawson
- Born: 6 May 1934 (age 92)
- Education: Scotch College, Melbourne; University of Melbourne
- Occupations: Public health doctor Scientist
- Known for: Research on breast cancer; originating public health services and prevention programs introduced as a standard part of Australian and international public health services
- Spouse: Margaret Lawson
- Children: 8 children
- Parent(s): Jack and Kitty Lawson
- Website: www.professor-jameslawson.com

James "Jim" Sutherland Lawson (born 6 May 1934) is an Australian public health doctor and scientist, known for research on breast cancer and for public health services and prevention programs, currently in use in Australian and international public health services.

== Early life ==
Jim Lawson is the youngest of three children of Jack and Kitty Lawson of Castlemaine, Victoria and the grandson of Harry Lawson, the 27th Premier of Victoria. During the Second World War, Lawson attended the local primary and high school, then he was sent as a boarder to the private Scotch College in Melbourne. Subsequently, he began medical studies at the University of Melbourne, completed with the prize in surgery and a top place as an intern at the Royal Melbourne Hospital. Following his interest in child health, Lawson began training at Melbourne's Royal Children's Hospital.

In 1961, he joined an International Red Cross expedition to the Congo. There he managed together with Gerry Joyce (another Australian surgeon) a District Hospital that had been abandoned by the Belgians following the Congo independence movement and revolution. The context was difficult, as a result of the period of turmoil of those years.

Afterwards, he came back to the children's hospital, where he met (and married nine months later) his future wife, Margaret Ralton.

== Papua New Guinea ==
Soon after their wedding, Lawson and Margaret left for Port Moresby in Papua New Guinea. There he managed the children's ward of the local hospital. Lawson was later awarded a Doctorate in Medicine for his research into the best ways of treating Papuan children suffering from a range of infectious conditions, including pneumonia, diarrhoeal disease and meningitis.

== Australian health system management ==
Lawson and his family returned to Melbourne, following his appointment as Medical Director of the Western General Hospital. He later moved to Hobart, as Director of Tasmanian Hospital and Health Services. During these years, he became involved in activism, writing and publishing reformist books and articles concerning ways of improving the hospital and health system.

In 1974, Lawson was named Director of Health for Northern Sydney. Here he developed a range of innovative services, which were afterwards introduced as a standard part of both Australian and international public health services:

- the organisation of co-ordinated hospital and health services on a community wide basis,
- the provision of expert hospital emergency services in place of trainee medical officer based services,
- development of co-ordinated rehabilitation and geriatric services.

He also introduced a series of public health prevention programs, including

- mandatory safety architectural glass in windows and doors to reduce profound lacerations,
- safe children's playgrounds,
- safety fences around private swimming pools,
- safe rules for rugby players to prevent quadriplegic neck injuries,
- health promotion among isolated rural Aboriginal communities in New South Wales,
- the successful development of groups as a means of improving social relationships among Australian mothers of new born infants(Lawson & Callaghan 1991).

== Academia ==
In 1987 Lawson was recruited by the University of New South Wales and as Head of the School of Public Health, he introduced Master of Public Health programs into the Medical Faculty at this University. During the initial AIDS epidemic of 1983, together with other colleagues, he met and talked to drug users, documenting the sharing of a single intravenous needle as the main factor in the rapid spread of the disease.

== Breast and prostate cancer research ==
In 1998, one of Lawson's post graduate students noted the strikingly lower risk of breast cancer among Asian as compared to Western women and the fact that this risk rose rapidly when Asian women migrated to the West. Lawson initiated further research, the first Australian investigations into viruses as potential causes of human breast cancer. The innovative outcomes of this research are:

- the first identification by molecular methods of mouse mammary tumor viruses (MMTV), the known cause of breast cancer in mice, in human milk,
- the first identification of high risk human papilloma viruses (HPVs, the known cause of cervical cancer) in human breast cancer cell cultures,
- the first identification of HPV associated koilocytes (abnormal precancerous cells specific to HPV infections) in human breast tumors,
- the development of unambiguous evidence that high risk HPVs are present in human breast cancer and that they have oncogenic characteristics,
- the unambiguous evidence that MMTV is located in breast cancer cell nuclei and is associated with high expression of the oncogene WNT1,
- the first indication that some breast cancers may be as a consequence of sexually transmitted HPVs,
- the development of evidence which contradicts the traditional scientific wisdom that breast feeding is not associated with breast cancer,
- the development of evidence that localised breast cancers may have systemic influences in skin and hair,
- the first recognition that some MMTV positive breast cancers may have similar morphology (microscopic appearances) to MMTV positive mouse mammary tumors,
- contradiction of the scientific belief that estrogen receptor expression in normal breast tissues is higher in breast cancer of Western as compared to Asian women thus supporting the use of tamoxifen as a treatment for breast cancer in Asia.

This research had shown that human papilloma virus and mouse mammary tumor viruses are present in up to half of all breast cancers in Western women.

Together with his grandmother colleague Wendy Glenn also of the University of New South Wales, Sydney, Australia, he has published evidence that mouse mammary tumour virus and human papilloma virus are highly likely to have causal roles in human breast cancer. Together with Gertrude Buehring of the University of California at Berkeley, Lawson has contributed to research into Bovine leukemia virus which may also have a role in human breast cancer.

Lawson has also worked on the infectious causes of heart attacks. He has published the hypothesis that food and infections combine to initiate atheromatous cardiovascular disease in childhood.

== Books ==
Lawson has written 9 books, including

Year	Titles
1964	Paediatric Handbook – The Royal Children's Hospital, Melbourne
1999	Breast cancer: Can You Prevent It?
2001	Public Health Australia: An introduction
2022	Catching Breast Cancer: The Hunt for the Breast Cancer Virus

== Awards ==
Year	Titles
1961	Meritorious Service Award. International Red Cross, Geneva.
1972	National Military Service Medal. Anniversary 1951-1972
2003	Member of the Order of Australia (AM)

== Journal articles ==
Lawson has written over 200 journal articles

- Lawson, J.S.; Cullen, C. (1979). "The Successful Development of Co-ordinated Rehabilitation and Geriatric Services in Northern Sydney". Australian Health Review. 4 (10): 1–10.
- Lawson, J.S.; T.I., Oliver (1979). "Glass Laceration Injuries and Prevention". Medical Journal of Australia. 1 (5): 190–191. doi:10.5694/j.1326-5377.1979.tb128987.x. PMID 449776. S2CID 22936124.
- Lawson, J.S.; T.I., Oliver (1981). "Playground Equipment and accidents"". Australian Paediatric Journal. 17 (2): 100–103. doi:10.1111/j.1440-1754.1981.tb01914.x. PMID 7305767. S2CID 676961.
- Lawson, J.S.; T.I., Oliver (1998). "Domestic Swimming Pool Drowning in Children. Positive Results of a Practical Prevention Programme". Australian Paediatric Journal. 14 (4): 275–277. doi:10.1111/j.1440-1754.1978.tb02998.x. PMID 747547. S2CID 12766909.
- Rotem, T.R.; Rawson, J.S. (1998). "Severe cervical spinal cord injuries related to rugby union and league football in New South Wales, 1984-1996". The Medical Journal of Australia. 168 (8): 379–381. doi:10.5694/j.1326-5377.1998.tb138989.x. PMID 9594946. S2CID 22747675.
- Lawson, J.S.; Close, G. (1994). "New Public Health' approaches among isolated rural Aboriginal communities in New South Wales". Aboriginal and Torres Strait Islander Information Bulletin. 19: 25–35.
- Lawson, J.S. (1991). "Recreating the village: the successful development of groups as a means of improving social relationships among Australian mothers of new born infants". Australian Journal of Public Health. 15 (1): 64–66. doi:10.1111/j.1753-6405.1991.tb00012.x. PMID 2025679.
- Johal, H.; Ford, C.E.; Glenn, W.K.; Heads, J.; Rawson, J.S. (2011). "Mouse mammary tumor like virus (MMTV) sequences in breast milk from healthy lactating women". Breast Cancer Research and Treatment. 129 (1): 149–155. doi:10.1007/s10549-011-1421-6. PMID 21365265. S2CID 24895546.
- Lawson, J.S.; Glenn, W.K. (1991). "Koilocytes indicate a role for human papilloma virus in breast cancer". British Journal of Cancer. 101 (8): 1351–1356. doi:10.1038/sj.bjc.6605328. PMC 2768439. PMID 19773762.
- Heng, B.; Glenn, W.K.; Ye, Y; Tran, D.; Lawson, J.S. (2009). "Human papilloma virus is associated with breast cancer". British Journal of Cancer. 101 (8): 1345–1350. doi:10.1038/sj.bjc.6605282. PMC 2737128. PMID 19724278.
- Lawson, J.S.; Glenn, W.K.; Whitaker, N.J. (2008). "Breast cancer, human papilloma virus and sexual activities". British Journal of Cancer. 98 (2): 510–511. doi:10.1038/sj.bjc.6604104. PMC 2361455.
- Glenn, WK; Heng, B; Delprado, W; Iacopetta, B; Lawson, JS (2013). "Epstein-Barr Virus, Human Papillomavirus and Mouse Mammary Tumour Virus as Multiple Viruses in Breast Cancer". PLOS ONE. 7 (11) e48788. Bibcode:2012PLoSO...748788G. doi:10.1371/journal.pone.0048788. PMC 3501510. PMID 23183846.
- Glenn, WK; Whitaker, NJ; Lawson, JS (2012). "High risk human papillomavirus and Epstein Barr virus in human breast milk". BMC Research Notes. 5 (1): 477. doi:10.1186/1756-0500-5-477. PMC 3492016. PMID 22937830.
- Lawson, J.S.; Tran, D.D.; Carpenter, E; Ford, C.E.; Rawlinson, W.D.; Whitaker, N.J.; Delprado, W. (2006). "Presence of mouse mammary tumour-like virus gene sequences may be associated with specific human breast cancer morphology". Journal of Clinical Pathology. 59 (12): 1287–1292. doi:10.1136/jcp.2005.035907. PMC 1860546. PMID 16698952.
- Lawson, J.S.; Salmons, B.; Ye, Y; Heng, B; Moody, P; Johal, H; Rawlinson, WD; Delprado, W (2010). "Mouse mammary tumor virus-like sequences in human breast cancer". Cancer Research. 70 (9): 3576–3585. doi:10.1158/0008-5472.can-09-4160. PMID 20388779.
- Lawson JS, Glenn WK. Evidence for a causal role by mouse mammary tumour-like virus in human breast cancer. npj Breast Cancer. 2019 Nov 7;5:40. doi: 10.1038/s41523-019-0136-4.PMID 31728407
- Lawson JS, Glenn WK. Evidence for a causal role by human papillomaviruses in prostate cancer - a systematic review. Infect Agent Cancer. 2020 Jul 14;15:41. doi: 10.1186/s13027-020-003058.PMID 32684946
- Lawson JS, Glenn WK. Catching viral breast cancer. Infect Agent Cancer. 2021 Jun 10;16(1):37. doi: 10.1186/s13027-021-00366-3.PMID 34108009
- Lawson JS, Glenn WK. Infection and food combine to cause atherosclerotic coronary heart disease. Int J Cardiol Heart Vasc. 2021 Jul 6;35:100807. doi: 10.1016/j.ijcha.2021.100807.PMID 34286061
- Lawson JS, Glenn WK. Mouse Mammary Tumour Virus (MMTV) in Human Breast Cancer. Viruses. 2022 Mar 30;14(4):721. doi: 10.3390/v14040721.PMID 35458452
- Lawson JS, Glenn WK. The viral origins of breast cancer. Infect Agent Cancer. 2024 Aug 26;19(1):39. Lawson JS, Glenn WK. Human papilloma virus as causal in breast cancer. Front Oncol. 2026 Sep 2;16:1853427
