= William Lawson =

William Lawson may refer to:

- William Lawson (banker) (1772–1848), businessman, office holder, justice of the peace and politician born in Nova Scotia
- William Lawson (co-operator) (1836–1916), co-operator and agriculturalist
- William Lawson (explorer) (1774–1850), explorer of New South Wales, Australia
- William Lawson (priest) (c.1554–1635), English cleric and writer on gardening
- William Lawson (speedway rider) (born 1987), former Scottish speedway rider
- William P. Lawson (1879 or 1880–1946), American investment banker and politician
- W. R. Lawson William Ramage Lawson (1840–1922), British journalist, economics writer
- William Lawson's, a brand of whisky owned by Bacardi
- Dr. William B. Lawson, African American psychiatrist and researcher
