= David A. Brennen =

American lawyer (born 1966)

- Born: October 30, 1966 (age 59)
- Spouse: Kimberly Brennen
- Children: Spenser Brennen, Clarence Brennen, Andrew Brennen

Academic background
- Education: BS, finance, 1988, Florida Atlantic University; JD, 1991, LL. M., Taxation, 1994, University of Florida

David A. Brennen is an American lawyer. In 2009, Brennen was named dean of the University of Kentucky College of Law.

== Early life and education ==
Brennen graduated with a finance degree from Florida Atlantic University and earned his Juris Doctor and Master of Laws in Taxation from the University of Florida.

== Career ==
Upon completing his formal education, Brennen accepted a faculty position at the University of Georgia School of Law from 2006 until 2009. He eventually left the institution to become dean of the University of Kentucky College of Law. While serving in this role, he was selected for the American Council on Education (ACE) Fellowship program and named to the Lawyers of Color's Fourth Annual Power List. In 2019, Brennen was elected vice president/president-elect of the Southeast Association of Law Schools. During his year with the ACE's Fellowship program, Mary J. Davis took over as interim dean of the University of Kentucky College of Law.
