= Howard David Hermansdorfer =

American judge

Judge of the United States District Court for the Eastern District of Kentucky
- In office March 7, 1972 – January 31, 1981
- Appointed by: Richard Nixon
- Preceded by: Seat established by 84 Stat. 294
- Succeeded by: Henry Rupert Wilhoit Jr.

Personal details
- Born: Howard David Hermansdorfer; April 11, 1931 Ashland, Kentucky
- Died: November 17, 2003 (aged 72) Ashland, Kentucky
- Education: Princeton University (A.B.); University of Virginia School of Law (LL.B.)

Howard David Hermansdorfer (April 11, 1931 – November 17, 2003) was a United States district judge of the United States District Court for the Eastern District of Kentucky.

== Education and career ==
Born in Ashland, Kentucky, Hermansdorfer received an Artium Baccalaureus degree from Princeton University in 1953 and a Bachelor of Laws from the University of Virginia School of Law in 1959. He was in private practice in Ashland from 1959 to 1972.

== Federal judicial service ==
On February 16, 1972, Hermansdorfer was nominated by President Richard Nixon to a new seat on the United States District Court for the Eastern District of Kentucky created by 84 Stat. 294. He was confirmed by the United States Senate on March 2, 1972, and received his commission on March 7, 1972. Hermansdorfer served in that capacity until his resignation on January 31, 1981.

== Death ==
Hermansdorfer died on November 17, 2003, in Ashland.

== Sources ==
Legal offices
Preceded by Seat established by 84 Stat. 294	Judge of the United States District Court for the Eastern District of Kentucky; 1972–1981	Succeeded by Henry Rupert Wilhoit Jr.
