= Murrill =

Murrill is a surname. Notable people with the surname include:

- Herbert Murrill (1909–1952), English musician, composer, and organist
- Liz Murrill (born 1963), American politician and lawyer
- William Murrill (1869–1957), American mycologist

== See also ==
- Murrell (disambiguation)
- Murrills
