= Robert G. Lawson =

American law professor (born 1938)

Dean of the University of Kentucky College of Law
- In office 1982–1988
- Preceded by: William Lewis Matthews Jr.
- Succeeded by: George W. Hardy III
- In office 1971–1973 (Note: Acting dean)
- Preceded by: Thomas P. Lewis
- Succeeded by: Rutherford B. Campbell Jr.

Personal details
- Born: July 15, 1938 (age 88) Logan County, West Virginia
- Education: Berea College (BA); University of Kentucky College of Law (JD)
- Occupation: Lawyer, author, and professor.
- Website: UK College of Law

Robert Gene Lawson (born July 15, 1938) is an American academic and lawyer from Kentucky who has gained prominence for his contributions to the legal framework of Kentucky. For much of his career, he was a law professor at the University of Kentucky College of Law, and twice served as the college's dean.

== Biography ==
Lawson holds the position of the principal drafter to both the Kentucky Penal Code and the Kentucky Rules of Evidence. He has also served as Dean of the College of Law from 1971 to 1973 and 1982 to 1988, and is a member of the University of Kentucky College of Law Hall of Fame, having been inducted in 1996. He is also a member of the University of Kentucky Hall of Distinguished Alumni. The Bob Lawson Society is named after him, and grants membership to all individuals who annually donate $1,000 or more to UK Law.

Lawson taught his final class on December 4, 2014.

In 2021, fellow UK Law professor William Fortune published, "The Man from Whitman Creek: A Biography of Robert G. Lawson."
