= Patricia Lawson =

Canadian multi-sport athlete and coach (1929–2019)

Patricia Dawson
- Born: November 18, 1929; Saskatoon, Saskatchewan, Canada
- Died: October 10, 2019 (aged 89); Saskatoon, Saskatchewan, Canada
- Education: University of Saskatchewan; University of Oregon; University of Southern California
- Occupation: Multi-sport athlete
- Years active: 1930s–1984

Patricia Lawson (November 18, 1929 – October 10, 2019) was a Canadian multi-sport athlete and coach who played basketball, golf, speed skating, swimming, tennis and track and field. She won provincial championships in all six sports and claimed two national basketball titles in 1955 with the Vancouver Eilers and in 1959 with the Saskatoon Adilman Aces. Lawson took five Saskatchewan Senior Women's golf titles and two Canadian Senior Women's golf championships and played for the Canada women's national basketball team at the 1959 Pan American Games. Lawson worked in the University of Saskatchewan's faculty of the Department of Physical Education from 1956 to 1990 and coached the Huskiette basketball team for two periods. She is a member of various halls of fame and a women's rookie of the year trophy was named after her by the University of Saskatchewan.

== Early life and education ==
On November 18, 1929, Lawson was born in Saskatoon, Saskatchewan. She was the eldest daughter of English immigrants William Henry Lawson from Darlington who worked for the Campbell, Wilson and Millar, dry foods and grocery sellers as well as serving in the Princess Patricia's Canadian Light Infantry in World War One action on the Western Front and Irene Victoria Chater of Sunderland. She had one sister. Lawson attended Caswell Elementary School and later Bedford Road Collegiate. She enrolled at the University of Saskatchewan in 1947, and graduated with a Bachelor of Arts degree in 1950. She then earned a Bachelor of Education degree in 1953. In 1959, Lawson completed a Master's degree at the University of Oregon and a Doctor of Philosophy degree at the University of Southern California eight years later.

== Career ==
She took up sport when she entered an under-10 swimming race in her youth and won. Lawson won each of the single track and field events she entered at Caswell Elementary School before enrolling at Bedford Road Collegiate. She went on to claim five Canadian provincial titles in six individual sports: Lawson broke the provisional records for the 220 and 420 yard events in speed skating in 1944, and won the 1947 Canadian Intermediate Ladies Championship title. She won all six of the track and field competitions she entered in the Bedford Road championships in May 1947 and set the high school record in the high jump discipline. That July, Lawson took the women's shot put event at the Canadian Track and Field Championships. In October of that year, she won the 440 yard relay, the running high jump and the broad jump competitions at the Western Canada Intercollegiate Athletic Union track and field championships.

Throughout her time as a student athlete at the University of Saskatchewan, she competed on a total of thirteen varsity teams in sports such as basketball, swimming, track and field and tennis. In 1948, Lawson won the women's open singles, the women's open doubles and the mixed open doubles competitions at the Central Saskatchewan Tennis Championships. She claimed victory in the women's competition of the Canadian Amateur Speed Skating Championships in February 1949, and went on to claim wins in each of the 100 yards free style, 50 years back stroke and the 50 years freestyle to tally 15 points in the intercollegiate swimming meet at Saskatoon the following month. Lawson won the ladies' singles, ladies' doubles and mixed doubles at the 1950 Central Saskatchewan Tennis tournament. In 1954, Lawson tied for first with Doreen Ryan for the senior women's title at the Canadian Speed Skating Championship.

She was named most valuable player in her debut season with the Saskatchewan Huskies. In 1955 as a senior competitor, Lawson and the Saskatoon Aces won the 1955 women's basketball title for Saskatchewan teams. She went on to claim the 1955 Canadian Basketball Championship playing for the Vancouver Eilers and the 1959 Canadian Basketball Championship as part of the Saskatoon Adilman Aces. Lawson was named to the Canada women's national basketball team for the 1959 Pan American Games in Chicago, one of five Aces players to play for the national squad.

At age 40, she took up golf. She won the Saskatchewan Senior Women's championship on five occasions and took the Canadian Senior Women's championship two times for Team Saskatchewan with Barb Danaher, Joanne Goulet and Vivian Holizki. Lawson played for Team Saskatchewan seven times in the Amateur championship and twelve occasions in the Senior championship. She took the Waskesiu Ladies' Lobstick five times over the course of four decades between 1968 and 1991 and chaired the River Ladies Classic competition from 1988 to 1990. Lawson was also a Golf Saskatchewan golf course rater for 15 years, supported junior golfers and was a golf instructor at many Saskatchewan golf courses.

During the early to late 1950s, Lawson primarily worked at Nutana Collegiate as a teacher. She also briefly worked in Vancouver and continue her teaching tenure with Britannia Secondary School. In 1956, she joined the University of Saskatchewan's faculty of the Department of Physical Education and was made Women's Athletic Director until 1967. Lawson coached the Huskiette basketball team between 1956 and 1964 and again from 1967 to 1968. Throughout this time period, Lawson declined an offer to coach the Canada women's national basketball team in 1966. The following year, Lawson coached the Huskiette team that competed in the basketball event at the 1967 Canada Winter Games.

In 1975, she was appointed to the National Advisory Council on Fitness and Amateur Sport, having previously served on it from 1967 and 1970. Lawson was made chairperson of the council in 1978, and served one term in the position. She was president of the Canadian Association for Health, Physical Education and Recreation in 1984, and was a founder member of the Canadian Association for the Advancement of Women in Sport aiming to improve the representation of women at every level of Canadian sport. She retired from the University of Saskatchewan in 1990 to become professor emeritus and delivered the R. Tait Mackenzie Memorial Address.

== Personal life ==
Having needed to be given oxygen for a year as a result of fibrosis, Lawson was diagnosed with lung cancer in 2019. On October 10, 2019, she died at the St. Paul's Hospital in Saskatoon.

== Legacy and honours ==
She was named a charter fellow of the North American Society of Health, Physical Education, Sport and Dance Professionals in 2000. Lawson is a member of various Halls of Fame. In 1984, she was added to the University of Saskatchewan Athletic Hall of Fame; the Saskatchewan Sports Hall of Fame and Museum in 1985; the Saskatoon Sports Hall of Fame in 1986; the Saskatchewan Golf Hall of Fame in 2011, the Canada Basketball Hall of Fame in 2019; and the Bedford Road Wall of Honour. In 1996, the College of Kinesiology recognised Lawson as one of the "First and Best" and was presented a University of Saskatchewan alumni achievement award in 2018. The University of Saskatchewan named the Patricia Lawson Trophy after her and it is presented to the Saskatchewan Huskies female athletic rookie of the year.
