= John Lawson (baseball) =

American baseball player (1887–1964)

- Pitcher
- Born: September 10, 1887; Belvidere, Illinois, U.S.
- Died: March 9, 1964 (aged 76); Belvidere, Illinois, U.S.

Negro league baseball debut
- 1909, for the Leland Giants

Last appearance
- 1909, for the Leland Giants

Teams
- Leland Giants (1909)

John Alden Lawson Jr. (September 10, 1887 – March 9, 1964) was an American Negro league pitcher in the 1900s.

A native of Belvidere, Illinois, Lawson played for the Leland Giants in 1909. He died in Belvidere in 1964 at age 76.
