= Henry Lawson (disambiguation) =

Henry Lawson (1867–1922) was an Australian writer and poet.

Henry Lawson may also refer to:

- Sir Henry Lawson, 2nd Baronet (1663–1720), of the Lawson baronets
- Sir Henry Lawson, 4th Baronet (1712–1781), of the Lawson baronets
- Sir Henry Lawson, 6th Baronet (1750–1834), of the Lawson baronets
- Henry Lawson (astronomer) (1774–1855), English astronomer
- Sir Henry Merrick Lawson (1859–1933), British Army general
- Henry Lawson (cricketer) (1865–1941), New Zealand cricketer
- Sir Henry Joseph Lawson, 3rd Baronet (1877–1947), of the Lawson baronets
- Geoff Lawson (cricketer) (born 1957), Australian cricketer, nicknamed "Henry" after the writer

== See also ==
- Harry Lawson (disambiguation)
