= John Lawson (footballer) =

English footballer

Personal information
- Full name: John Richard Lawson
- Date of birth: 3 February 1925
- Place of birth: York, England
- Position: Full back

Senior career*
Years	Team	Apps	(Gls)
- Dringhouses
1944–1947	York City	1	(0)
- Scarborough
- * Club domestic league appearances and goals

John Richard Lawson (3 February 1925 – 1990) was an English footballer.

== Career ==
Lawson joined York City from Dringhouses in August 1944. He then joined Scarborough.
