= John Lawson (theologian) =

Irish academic and theologian

John Lawson (1709–1759) was an Irish academic.

Lawson was born in Magherafelt and educated at Trinity College Dublin. He became a Fellow of Trinity College in 1735, a lecturer in 1746 and Regius Professor of Divinity there in 1753.
