= Kenneth Lawson (artist) =

English artist and set designer (1920–2008)

Kenneth Lawson (22 August 1920 - 22 May 2008) was an English artist and set designer.

Lawson was born in South Norwood on 22 August 1920. He began painting in the 1930s in Dulwich, mentored by James Fitton RA, and in 1942 exhibited with The London Group. His works are held in collections including The Whitworth, Gallery Oldham and Salford Museum and Art Gallery.

In 1945, during World War II, Lawson survived a hit on his home by a V-1 flying bomb.

When Graham Sutherland started work on the large (4.25 metres (13.9 ft) × 3.27 metres (10.7 ft)) work The Origins of the Land, commissioned for the Festival of Britain and now in Tate Britain, he sought advice from Lawson who had experience of large-scale works; when it was vandalised before display, Lawson was commissioned to repair it. Lawson later worked with Sutherland on studies for the large tapestry Christ in Glory in the Tetramorph for Coventry Cathedral.

Lawson moved to Manchester in 1956 to work as a designer for the BBC; he worked on over 1,500 shows including designing the first set for Top of the Pops in 1964. He retired from the BBC in 1980, and in 1982-1985 designed sets for seven operas by South Yorkshire Opera at The Crucible in Sheffield.

In retirement he returned to painting, inspired by visits to the Algarve, Madeira and the Amalfi coast, and latterly he spend winters in Menton, France.

Lawson died on 22 May 2008 at his home in Didsbury, Greater Manchester, after suffering from cancer. He was survived by his long-term partner Jean Maudsley.
