= Andrew Lawson (disambiguation) =

Andrew Lawson (1861–1952) was a professor of geology at the University of California, Berkeley.

Andrew Lawson may also refer to:

- Andrew Lawson (cricketer) (born 1967), South African cricketer
- Andrew Lawson (Australian politician) (1873–?), Australian politician in the Tasmanian Legislative Council
- Andrew Lawson (motorcyclist) (born 1993), motorcycle racer from Australia
- Andrew Lawson (photographer) (born 1945), British photographer, artist and author
- Andrew Lawson (singer)
- Andrew Lawson (MP) (1800–1853), British Conservative politician
