= British Journal of Cancer =

- Discipline: Oncology
- Language: English
- Edited by: Jeff Evans

Publication details
- History: 1947–present
- Publisher: Springer Nature (United Kingdom)
- Frequency: 24/year
- Open access: After 12 months
- License: CC-BY-NC-SA 3.0 (1999+)
- Impact factor: 7.8 (2025)

Standard abbreviations
- ISO 4: Br. J. Cancer

Indexing
- ISSN: 0007-0920 (print); 1532-1827 (web)

Links
- Journal homepage

The British Journal of Cancer (BJC) is a twice-monthly professional medical journal published by Springer Nature.

The BJC provides a forum for clinicians and scientists to communicate original research findings that have relevance to understanding the etiology of cancer and to improving patient treatment and survival. Once accepted, papers are published in print and online.

Full research papers are published under six broad headings:

- Clinical studies
- Translational therapeutics
- Molecular diagnostics
- Genetics and genomics
- Cellular and molecular biology
- Epidemiology

== History ==
The journal was founded in 1947 by the then British Empire Cancer Campaign (later named Cancer Research Campaign), one of the research charities which later merged to form Cancer Research UK. Cancer Research Campaign began partnering with Nature as publisher of the journal in the 1980s, but retained ownership and editorial control. In 2021, after the charity experienced a fall in charitable income during the COVID-19 pandemic, Cancer Research UK sold the journal to Springer Nature.

== Ranking ==
According to the Journal Citation Reports, the journal received an impact factor of 7.8 in 2025, ranking it 43rd journal in the category of Oncology. SJR ranks BJC as 32nd journal in cancer research with H-index 290.

== Indexing ==
BJC is a top cited general cancer journal committed to publishing cutting edge discovery, translational and clinical cancer research. The journal is indexed in:

- EMBASE Excerpta Medica
- Current Advances in Genetics and Molecular Biology
- Current Contents
- Medline/Index Medicus
- Index to Scientific Reviews
- Science Citation Index
- PubMed

== See also ==
- Cancer in the United Kingdom
- List of medical journals
