= Senator Lawson =

Senator Lawson may refer to:

- Al Lawson (born 1948), Florida State Senate
- Connie Lawson (born 1949), Indiana State Senate
- David G. Lawson (born 1946), Delaware State Senate
- John W. Lawson (1837–1905), Virginia State Senate
- Robert R. Lawson (1872–1934), New York State Senate
- Valarie Lawson (born 1966), Rhode Island State Senate

== See also ==
- Senator Larson (disambiguation)
