= James M. Lawson =

American politician

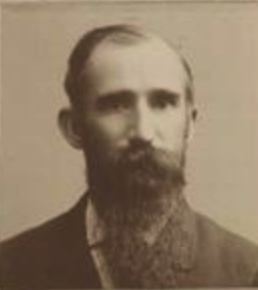

Member of the Virginia House of Delegates for Campbell and Lynchburg
- In office December 2, 1891 – December 6, 1893 Serving with R. Palmer Hunter
- Preceded by: James F. Butler
- Succeeded by: William McKendree Murrell
- In office December 2, 1885 – December 8, 1887 Serving with Joel B. Leftwich
- Preceded by: Robert H. Ward
- Succeeded by: R. Palmer Hunter

Personal details
- Born: James Morris Lawson; February 25, 1847 Campbell, Virginia, U.S.
- Died: January 29, 1916 (aged 68) Lynchburg, Virginia, U.S.
- Party: Democratic
- Spouse: Louisa Baker

James Morris Lawson (February 25, 1847 – January 29, 1916) was an American politician who served in the Virginia House of Delegates.

An obituary of Lawson characterized him as a "prominent and progressive citizen" of Brookneal, Virginia. He had been its postmaster, and sponsored the construction and management of stores and a hotel there.
