= William B. Lawson =

American professor and psychiatrist

- Scientific career
- Institutions: University of Illinois, Urbana; University of California, Irvine; Vanderbilt University; University of Arkansas; Howard University; Huston-Tillotson University
- Website: williamblawsonmdphd.com

William B. Lawson is an American professor, psychiatrist and a Distinguished Life Fellow of the American Psychiatric Association (DLFAPA).

== Early life ==
Lawson grew up on a farm in West Point, Virginia.

== Education ==
Lawson earned his PhD in psychology from the University of New Hampshire. He then went on to earn his medical degree from the Pritzker School of Medicine at the University of Chicago and finished a residency in adult psychiatry at Stanford University. He then finished a fellowship in psychopharmacology at the National Institute of Mental Health.

== Career and research ==
Lawson has been a professor at the University of Illinois, Urbana, University of California, Irvine, Vanderbilt University, University of Arkansas, Howard University, and Huston–Tillotson University. He also was a professor and Associate Dean of Health Disparities at Dell Medical School.

While at Howard University, Lawson oversaw a partnership between the university and the island of Bermuda. Howard University provided psychiatry consultation services to the island.

In 2015, Lawson served as the editor in chief of the Journal of the National Medical Association.

His research is focused on mental health and substance abuse disparities.

=== Awards and honors ===
Lawson is a Distinguished Life Fellow of the American Psychiatric Association. In 2002 the APA awarded him the Jeanne Spurlock, M.D. Minority Fellowship Achievement Award.

In 2013 Lawson was awarded the American Psychiatric Foundation's award for Advancing Minority Mental Health. In 2014 he was the recipient of the Solomon Carter Fuller Award for African American Pioneers. In 2017 he received the George Winokur Clinical Research Award from the American Academy of Clinical Psychiatrists. Lawson has also received the E.Y. Williams Clinical Scholar of Distinction Award from the National Medical Association.

=== Books ===
Lawson's writings on bipolar disorder in African Americans was published in Perspectives in Cross-cultural Psychiatry.
