= George Lawson =

George Lawson may refer to:

- George Lawson (MP for York) (1493–1543), English member of parliament
- George Lawson (English clergyman) (1598–1678), English divine and writer
- George Lawson (Scottish minister) (1749–1820), Scottish minister and biblical scholar
- George Lawson (botanist) (1827–1895), Canadian botanist
- George Anderson Lawson (1832–1904), British sculptor
- George Mervyn Lawson (1865–1945), South African clergyman
- George Lawson (Australian politician) (1880–1966), Australian politician
- George Lawson (RAF officer) (1899–1922), South African World War I flying ace
- George Lawson (MP for Motherwell) (1906–1978), Scottish member of parliament, 1954–1974
- George Lawson (judge), judge in Ceylon
- George Lawson, American singer from the vocal group Deep River Boys
- George "Yorkey" Lawson, Yorkshire-born fisherman and namesake of Yorkeys Knob, Queensland, Australia
