= Judge Lawson =

Judge Lawson may refer to:

- C. Alan Lawson (born 1961), judge of the Florida Fifth District Court of Appeal, and later justice of the Supreme Court of Florida
- David M. Lawson (born 1951), judge of the United States District Court for the Eastern District of Michigan
- Hugh Lawson (judge) (1941–2024), judge of the United States District Court for the Middle District of Georgia
- James Anthony Lawson (1817–1887), judge of the Court of Common Pleas of Ireland
- Marjorie McKenzie Lawson (1912–2002), judge of the Juvenile Court of the District of Columbia
- Thomas G. Lawson (1835–1912), judge of the Superior Courts of Ocmulgee circuit of Georgia
