= John Lawson (actor) =

British actor

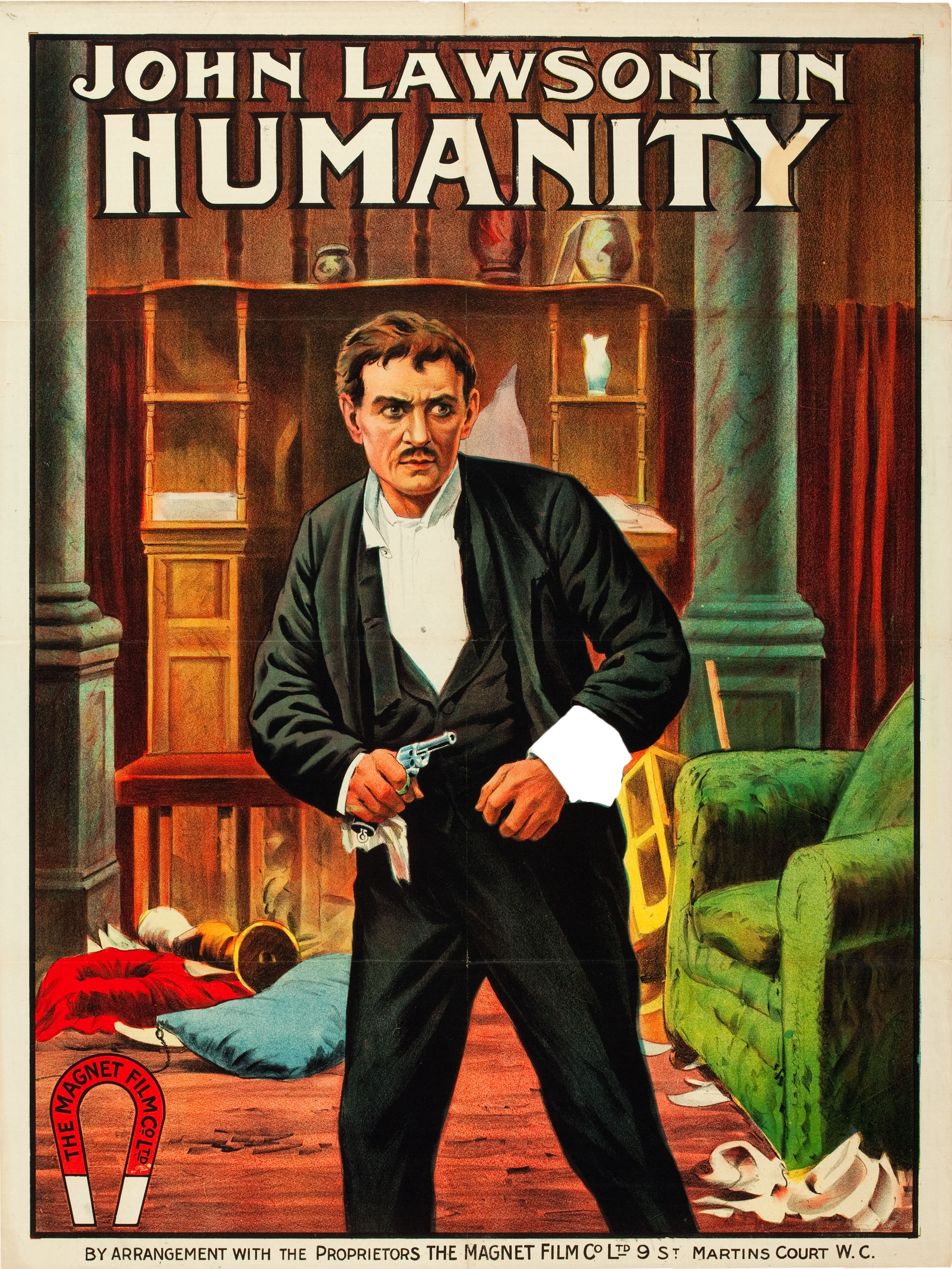
- 1913 film poster
- Born: John Ennis Lawson; 9 January 1865; Hollinwood, Lancashire, England
- Died: 25 November 1920 (aged 55); London, England
- Occupations: Actor, writer, stage and film director, theatre owner
- Years active: c. 1896 – 1920

John Ennis Lawson (9 January 1865 – 25 November 1920), known as "Humanity" Lawson, was a British actor who wrote, performed and directed dramatic sketches in music halls and silent films.

== Life and career ==
Born in Hollinwood near Manchester (not Derbyshire as suggested in some sources), he was the son of a Jewish woman who married a Christian. He began as an actor and trapeze artist, and made his music hall debut in 1896.

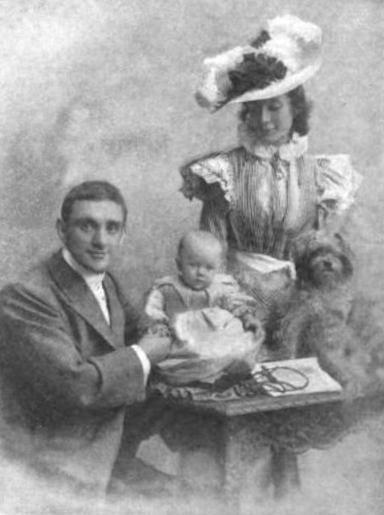
At home with Cissie Skinner in 1899

He wrote and performed the dramatic sketch "Humanity", which was immediately successful, and for the rest of his career he was known and billed as "Humanity" Lawson. In the piece, based on an actual event, Lawson plays the part of a Jew, Silvani, who has an unfaithful gentile wife. He fights his wife's lover in a spectacular scene in which everything on stage is smashed to pieces, and the stairway on which they are fighting eventually collapses, killing them both. According to W. J. MacQueen-Pope: "It is human nature to enjoy seeing things smashed up, and Lawson satisfied the most demanding of smash fans... People went to see it in myriads for years; it made no difference that they knew every word, every bit of business. There was always that wholesale smash-up which was irresistible." Performances concluded with a musical monologue, "Only a Jew", co-written by Lawson and Moses Besso, "dedicated to the Hebrew gentlemen of the world", with the refrain: "Only a Jew - the insult I'll remember / Only a Jew - then why not Christian too? / The same world lies before us, the same sun shining o'er us / And why should they insult a man - only a Jew!".

Lawson performed in the United States and Australia, and also recorded part of the sketch, and song, in 1897. A silent film was made of the sketch in 1913 by Barker Motion Photography, starring Lawson and directed by him with Bert Haldane. Lawson also appeared in two films directed by Sidney Northcote: The KIng of Crime (1914); and The Monkey's Paw (1915), the latter based on a play in which Lawson had performed in the West End. Lawson also acted in other plays, including The Shield of David, The King of Palestine, and The King’s Minister in which he played Benjamin Disraeli.

John Lawson married actress Cissie Skinner in 1896. By 1912, he had become the managing director of the Empire Theatre, Camberwell, with Cissie as the proprietress, who also appeared in some of their productions. They each petitioned for divorce in 1913, with John claiming Cissie's adultery with the Manager of the Shoreditch Empire, Hector Munro. He sued his wife successfully over ownership of the theatre. He also owned the Revue Theatre at Kingston-upon-Thames.

He died in London in 1920, at the age of 55.
