= Harry Lawson =

Harry Lawson may refer to:

- Harry John Lawson (1852–1925), British bicycle designer, cyclist, motor industry pioneer and fraudster
- Harry Levy-Lawson, 1st Viscount Burnham (1862–1933)
- Sir Harry Lawson (politician) (1875–1952), Australian politician
- Harry Lawson (runner) (1882–?), British-born Canadian marathon runner
- Harry Lawson (legal scholar) (1897–1983), British legal scholar

== See also ==
- Henry Lawson (disambiguation)
- Harold Andrew Balvaird Lawson (1899–1985), Scottish officer of arms
- Harold Lawson (1937–2019), American software engineer, computer architect and systems engineer
