= Paul Lawson =

Paul Lawson may refer to:

- Paul M. Lawson (1914–1988), American politician
- Paul Lawson (boxer) (born 1966), British boxer
- Paul Lawson (footballer) (born 1984), Scottish footballer
