= Ralph Thompson Morgan =

Ralph Thompson Morgan (died 31 March 1949) was an organist and author based in England.

== Life ==
He studied organ at Norwich Cathedral under Dr. Frank Bates.

== Appointments ==
- Organist of Christ Church, Dorchester 1891 - 1893
- Organist of St. Andrew's Church, Hingham, Norfolk 1893 - 1895
- Organist of St. Mary the Virgin, Hayes, Kent 1895 - 1906
- Organist of St Mary Redcliffe 1906 - 1949
- Organist of Colston Hall, Bristol

== Publications ==
He wrote

- St Mary Redcliffe, Bristol, A short Guide
- St Mary Redcliffe, A short account of its organs, etc.

Cultural offices
| Preceded by Joseph William Lawson | Organist of St Mary Redcliffe; 1906 - 1949 | Succeeded by Kenneth Roy Long |
