= Thomas Lawson (cricketer) =

English-born Scottish cricketer

Personal information
- Full name: Thomas Morrison Lawson
- Born: 16 September 1890; Edinburgh, Midlothian, Scotland
- Died: 8 February 1967 (aged 76); Church Village, Glamorgan, Wales
- Batting: Right-handed

Domestic team information
- Years: Team
- 1923–1924: Scotland

Career statistics
Competition	First-class
Matches	3
Runs scored	59
Batting average	9.83
100s/50s	–/–
Top score	22
Catches/stumpings	–/–
- Source: Cricinfo, 24 October 2022

Thomas Morrison Lawson (16 September 1890 – 8 February 1967) was an English-born Scottish first-class cricketer.

Lawson was born in England at Penrith in September 1890. He was educated in Scotland at the Royal High School of Edinburgh. He served in the British Army during the First World War with the Lowland Royal Field Artillery, enlisting as a gunner in November 1915, and by the end of the war he held the rank of bombardier. A club cricketer for Royal High School Former Pupils, Lawson made three appearances in first-class cricket for Scotland against Ireland and Wales in 1923, and the touring South Africans in 1924. He scored 59 runs in his three matches, with a highest score of 22. Lawson died in Wales at Church Village in February 1967.
