= Ivor Lawson =

Australian rules footballer

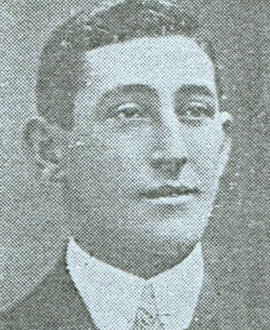

Personal information
- Full name: John Ballantyne Lawson
- Born: 2 May 1883; North Melbourne, Victoria
- Died: 2 December 1958 (aged 75); North Melbourne, Victoria
- Original team: Williamstown (VFA)
- Height: 178 cm (5 ft 10 in)
- Weight: 73 kg (161 lb)

Playing career^{1}
Years	Club	Games (Goals)
1904	Collingwood	7 (2)
1905–1907	St Kilda	30 (1)
1908–1909	Richmond	32 (3)
Total		69 (6)
- ^{1} Playing statistics correct to the end of 1909.

Career highlights
- Richmond Captain 1909 (3 games)

John Ballantyne "Ivor" Lawson (2 May 1883 – 2 December 1958) was an Australian rules footballer who played for the Collingwood Football Club in the VFL in 1904, for the St Kilda Football Club from 1905 to 1907 and then for the Richmond Football Club between 1908 and 1909.

Lawson captained Richmond on three occasions as the then Captain/Coach Dick Condon resigned the captaincy late in the season after pressure from the club's board to do so.
