= Gaines Lawson =

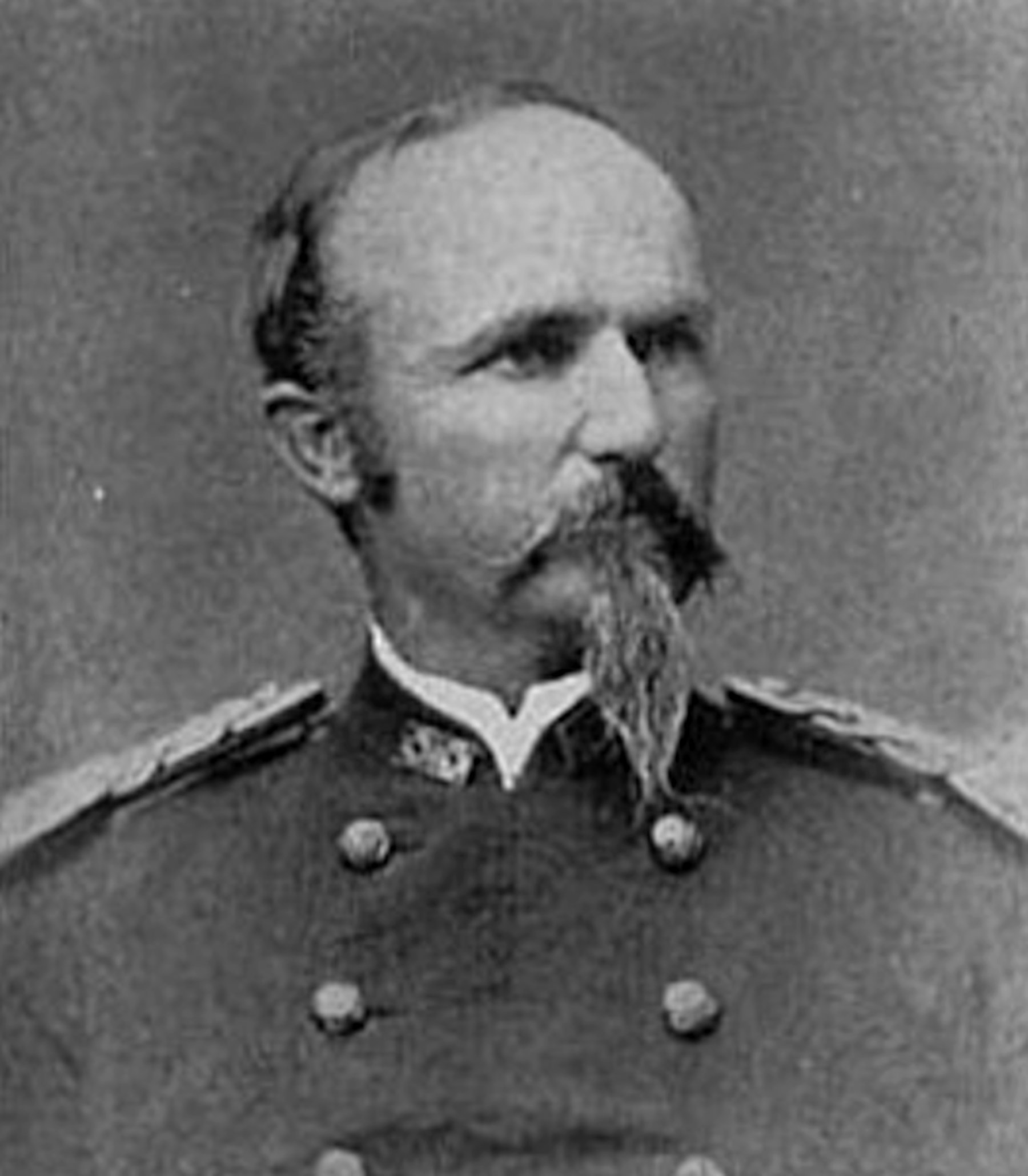
- Born: September 4, 1840; Hawkins County, Tennessee, U.S.
- Died: September 12, 1906 (aged 66)
- Burial place: Arlington National Cemetery
- Military career
- Allegiance: United States of America; Union
- Branch: United States Army; Union Army
- Service years: 1862–1865, 1866–1892
- Rank: Major; Brevet Lieutenant Colonel
- Units: Company D, 4th Tennessee Infantry
- Conflicts: American Civil War
- Awards: Medal of Honor

Gaines Lawson (September 4, 1840 – September 12, 1906) was a soldier in the Union Army and a Medal of Honor recipient for his actions in the American Civil War.

Lawson joined the 4th (East) Tennessee Infantry in December 1862, and mustered out with this regiment in August 1865. He was commissioned in the regular army in July 1866, and retired in September 1892.

== Medal of Honor citation ==
Rank and organization: First Sergeant, Company D, 4th East Tennessee Infantry. Place and date: At Minville, Tenn., October 3, 1863. Entered service at: Tennessee. Born: 1841, Hawkins County, Tenn. Date of issue: June 11, 1895.

Citation:

Went to the aid of a wounded comrade between the lines and carried him to a place of safety.

== See also ==
- List of Medal of Honor recipients
- List of American Civil War Medal of Honor recipients: G–L
