= Joseph William Lawson =

Joseph William Lawson (1844 - 16 April 1920) was an organist and composer based in England.

== Life ==
Joseph was born in 1844 in Bristol, Gloucestershire, England, the son of Joseph Lawson and Elizabeth Saunders. When Joseph's mother died when he was about 13 years old, his father remarried Elizabeth Davey, who continued to parent Joseph. The 1861 census for England records that Joseph was a commercial clerk, like his father. By the time of the 1871 census Joseph was a professional musician.

Joseph married twice: Firstly Joseph married in 1870 Jane Swallow, who died in 1875. The children from this marriage were:

- Marion Lawson (b. 1871)
- Blanche Lawson (b. 1873)
- Jane Lawson (b. 1875)

Joseph married secondly in 1880 Ellen Eliza Brightman . The children of this marriage were:

- Winifred Lawson (b. 1881)
- Gertrude Lawson (b. 1882)
- Hilda Lawson (b. 1884)
- Archibald Stainer Lawson (1885 - 1970)
- Mildrid Lawson (b. 1886)
- Donald Claxton Lawson (1888-1973)
- Ida Lawson (b. 1893)
- Cecil Vaughan Lawson (b. 1896)
- Basil Lawson (1897-1907)

== Appointments ==
- Organist of St Mary Redcliffe 1862 - 1906

== Compositions ==
He composed a set of evening canticles. The Nunc Dimittis was sung at his funeral.

Cultural offices
Preceded by William Haydn Flood	Organist of St Mary Redcliffe; 1862 - 1906	Succeeded by Ralph Thompson Morgan
