= William Murrell Jr. =

American politician

William Murrell, Jr.
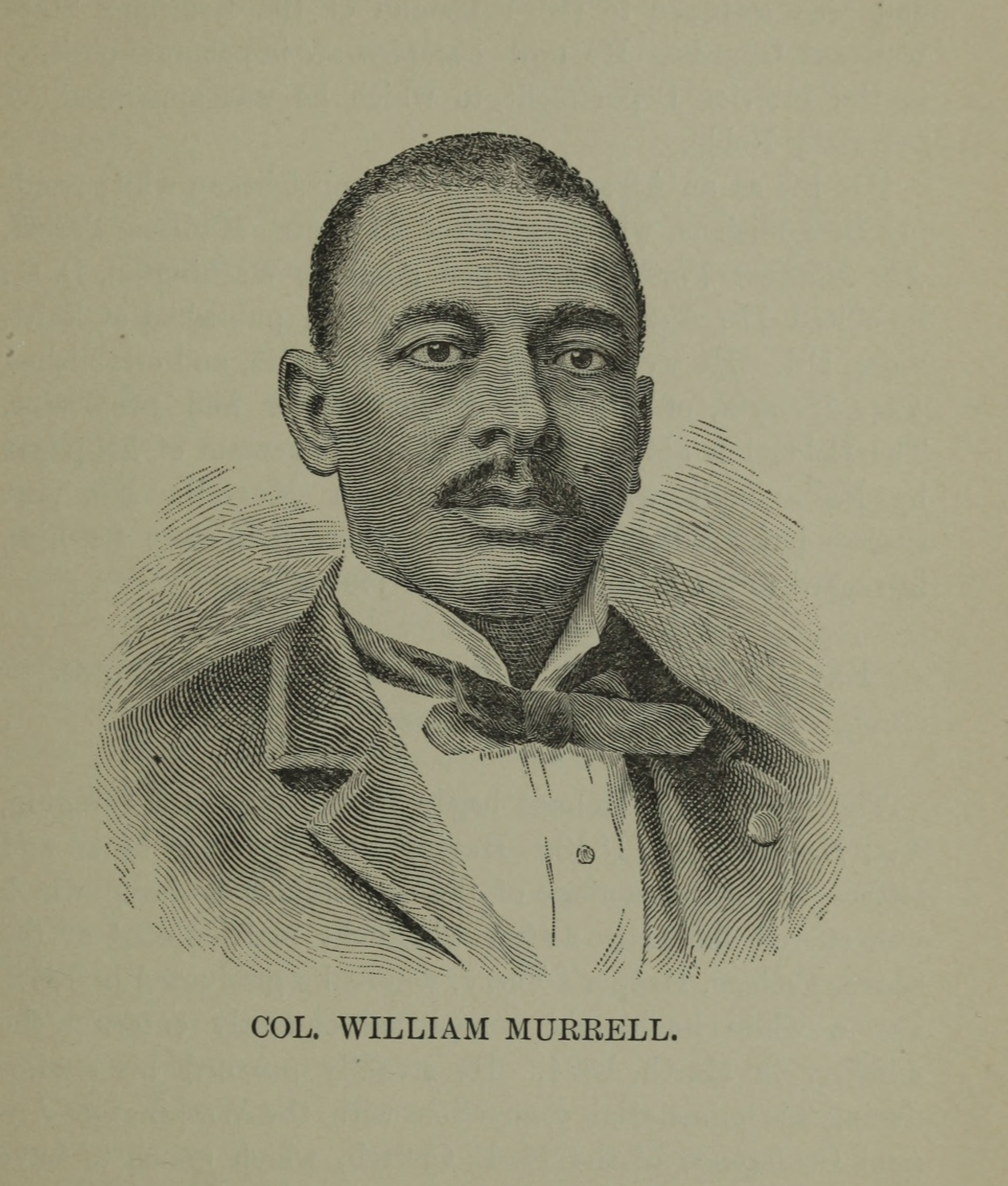

Louisiana House of Representatives for Madison Parish
- In office 1872 – 1876; 1879–1880

Personal details
- Born: c. 1845 Georgia, U.S.
- Died: 13 February 1932 Corning, New York, U.S.
- Relations: William Murrell, Sr. (father)
- Occupation: Newspaper editor, politician

Col. William Murrell, Jr. (c. 1845–1932) also known simply as William Murrell, was an American newspaper editor and politician. He represented Madison Parish in the Louisiana House of Representatives from for two terms.

== Biography ==
William Murrell Jr. was born in about 1845 in Georgia, where he was enslaved from birth.

During the start of the American Civil War, he served as valet to General James Longstreet of the Confederate States Army. In 1862, Gen. Longstreet retreated from the war after family tragedy. Murrell joined as a soldier in the 44th Virginia Infantry Regiment of the Confederate States Army. Using the name Joseph Hataway, he enlisted in the Union Army on 1 May 1865 for a 3-year term. He served as a musician in Company D of the 138th US Colored Volunteer Infantry from 15 July 1865 until 6 January 1866, when his company was mustered out in Atlanta, Georgia.

His father William Murrell, Sr. served as a politician in Lafourche Parish, Louisiana in the Reconstruction era. Murrell Jr. became a state legislator in Louisiana. He represented Madison Parish in the Louisiana House of Representatives from 1872 to 1876 and from 1879 to 1880. He opposed the exodus of African Americans to Kansas, known as the exodusters.

Murrell Jr. attended the 1873 State Colored Men's Convention held in New Orleans. During the Reconstruction era, Murrell Jr. edited the newspapers the Madison Vindicator, and the New Jersey Trumpet.

Murrell Jr. was a major on the staff for Governor William Pitt Kellogg, he was prompted to colonel and oversaw the Louisiana State National Guard. In 1891, he was appointed by secretary John Willock Noble to a role in the United States Department of the Interior.

In 1910, his wife Louisiana (Jones) Murrell died, and he entered the Soldiers Home in Hampton, Virginia. He later transferred to the Soldiers Home in Bath, New York. He married for the second time in 1918, and he and his wife lived in Corning, New York. He died in Corning on 13 February 1932.
