= William McKendree Murrell =

American politician

Member of the Virginia House of Delegates from the Campbell County district
- In office December 6, 1893 – March 8, 1894
- Preceded by: R. Palmer Hunter and James M. Lawson
- Succeeded by: W. T. Simpson

Personal details
- Born: August 20, 1854 Rustburg, Virginia, U.S.
- Died: March 23, 1935 (aged 80) Lynchburg, Virginia, U.S.
- Resting place: Spring Hill Cemetery
- Party: Democratic
- Spouse: Flora Scott Withers (m. 1882)
- Children: 5
- Education: University of Virginia School of Law
- Alma mater: Roanoke College
- Occupation: Politician; lawyer

William McKendree Murrell (August 20, 1854 – March 23, 1935) was an American politician and lawyer from Virginia. He served as a member of the Virginia House of Delegates, representing Campbell County from 1893 to 1894.

== Early life ==
William McKendree Murrell was born on August 20, 1854, in Rustburg, Campbell County, Virginia, to Frances Cornelia (née Smithson) and John Cobbs Murrell. His father was a lawyer. He studied at private schools in Campbell County. Murrell was a student at the Classical and Commercial School in Lynchburg. His teacher was C. L. C. Minor. Murrell graduated from Roanoke College in 1874, third in his class. He received a medal in oratory at his commencement. Murrell attended the University of Virginia School of Law, but did not graduate in the class of 1876 due to illness. He was a member of the Pi Delta Theta fraternity.

== Career ==
In 1877, Murrell started practicing law in Rustburg. He practiced with his father until his father's death on June 6, 1879. Murrell then practiced law alone. On May 24, 1879, Murrell was elected as commonwealth's attorney of Campbell County. He served in that role for almost 40 years. On November 1, 1892, Murrell opened a second law office in Lynchburg.

Murrell was a Democrat. Murrell served as a member of the Virginia House of Delegates, representing Campbell County, from December 6, 1893, to March 8, 1894.

== Personal life ==
Murrell married Flora Scott Withers on November 21, 1882. They had five children, Arthur Koiner, William McKendree Jr., Frances Payne, Robert Woodson Withers and Dandridge.

Murrell died on March 23, 1935, at his home in Lynchburg. He was buried at Spring Hill Cemetery.
