= Robert Lawson (British Army officer) =

British Army officer in the Royal Artillery

Lieutenant-General Robert Lawson
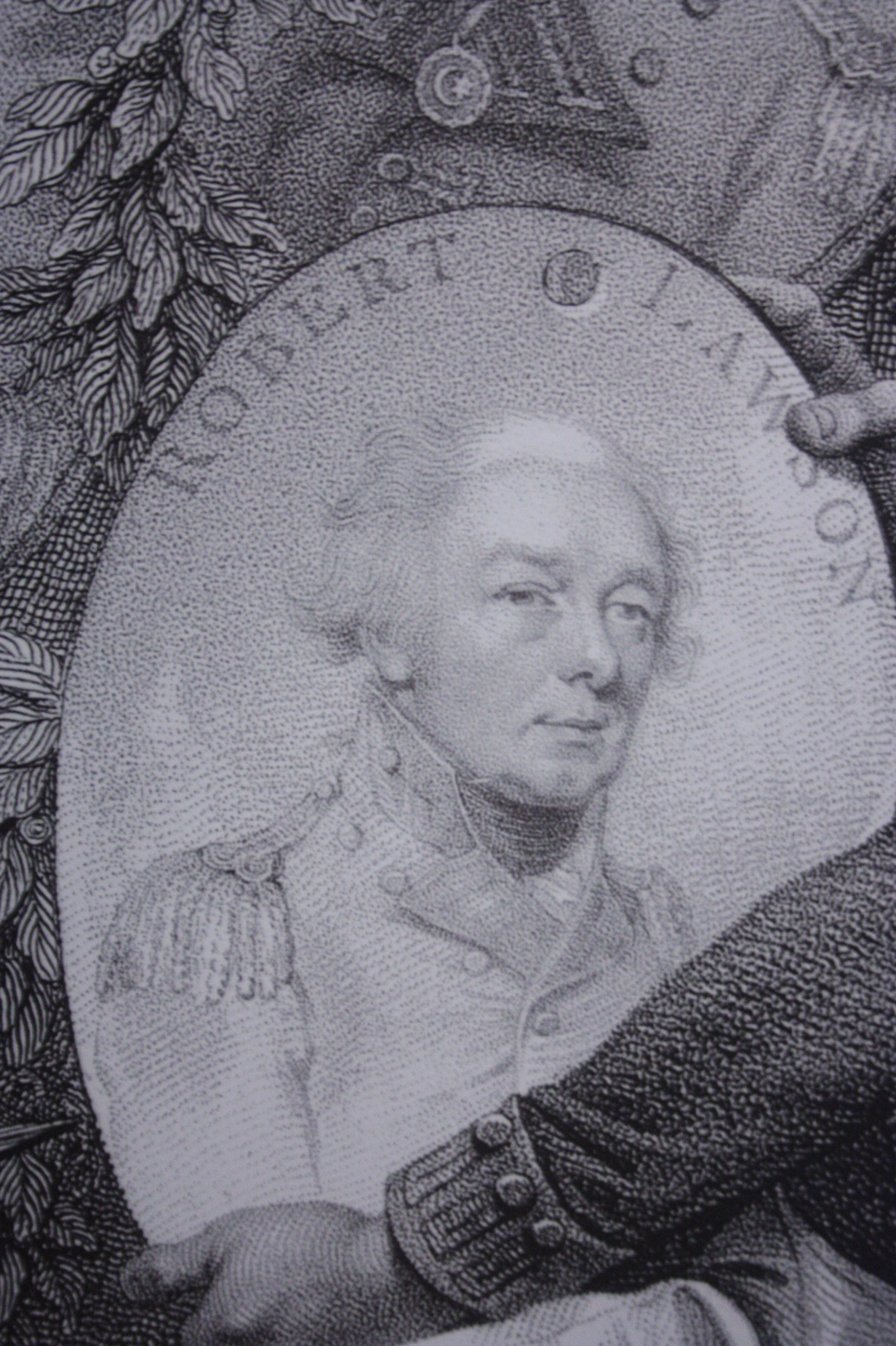
- Lt General Robert Lawson in 1801
- Died: 26 February 1816; Woolwich, England
- Military career
- Allegiance: Kingdom of Great Britain (to 1800) United Kingdom
- Branch: British Army
- Service years: 1798–1816
- Rank: Lieutenant-General
- Unit: Royal Artillery
- Commands: Chestnut Troop
- Conflicts: Seven Years' War; American Revolutionary War; Egyptian Campaign

Lieutenant-General Robert Lawson (died 26 February 1816) was a British Army officer who served in the Royal Artillery during the American War of Independence and the Egyptian Campaign.

== Career ==
Lawson entered the Royal Military Academy, Woolwich, on 17 July 1758, and passed out as a lieutenant-fireworker, royal artillery, on 25 December 1759. Lawson served through the famous siege of Belle Isle in 1761, and was afterwards at Gibraltar for some years. In 1766, he was promoted to second lieutenant, and in 1771 to first lieutenant. He went to America with Lord Cornwallis in 1776 and was deputy-bridgemaster of the army under Sir William Howe, and in 1779 was appointed bridgemaster to Sir Henry Clinton. There is little information respecting his services during the American war, but in the Royal Military Repository, Woolwich, was placed a model of "a field-carriage for small mortars to be used occasionally as howitzers", which is stated to have been invented and used by him at the siege of Charleston, and another showing his plan of mounting mortars for firing at various elevations, "experimented and approved at New York in 1780". During his time in America he was promoted to captain-lieutenant in 1779, and captain in 1782.

He returned home from America in 1783, and was afterwards in command of the three companies of artillery on Jamaica. In January 1793, he was promoted to major and appointed to command the first-formed troop of the Royal Horse Artillery, now the famed Chestnut Troop. The four oldest troops of the horse brigade were trained under him, and he devised the system of manoeuvre enabling them to act with cavalry. In 1794, he was promoted to lieutenant-colonel.

In 1799, Lawson appears to have been in command of the artillery at Newcastle-on-Tyne, and in January 1800 he was appointed to command the artillery of the expeditionary force destined for the Mediterranean. With some difficulty the temporary rank of brigadier-general, which had been accorded to officers of like standing of other arms, was obtained for him; during the campaign he was promoted to colonel in 1801. Lawson commanded the artillery throughout the campaign in Egypt. According to his commander, Lord Hutchinson, he performed excellently, and "he overcame difficulties that appeared insurmountable." His professional memoranda on the operations, were published by the Royal Artillery Institute, Woolwich, for the instruction of gunners of later generations.

During the invasion alarms of 1808 a project for the defence of London was started, which had the support of prime minister William Pitt, and Lawson, with the rank of brigadier-general, was given responsibility for the selection of sites for the batteries, but no practical results followed. Later in 1808, he was promoted to major-general. Lawson was transferred to Chatham, where the detached works known as Forts Pitt and Clarence were in course of construction, and where he was stationed for several years. He was appointed colonel-commandant of the old 10th Battalion, Royal Artillery in 1808. In 1813, he was promoted to lieutenant-general. He died at Woolwich, after fifty-six years' military service, on 26 February 1816. His son, Lieutenant-Colonel Robert Lawson (died 1826) was a distinguished artillery officer during the Peninsular War.
