= William Murrell (politician, died 1892) =

American politician

William Murrell, Sr.
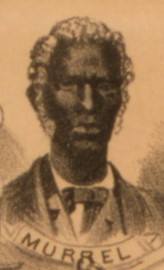

Louisiana House of Representatives for Lafourche Parish

Personal details
- Born: 1814 Georgetown, South Carolina, U.S.
- Died: February 7, 1892 (aged 77–78) Carrollton, New Orleans, Louisiana, U.S.
- Spouse: Comfort Caroline Cohee (m. 1851–?)
- Relations: William Murrell Jr. (son)
- Occupation: Minister, politician

Rev. William Murrell, Sr. (1814–February 7, 1892) was a pastor in the Methodist Episcopal Church and a state legislator in Lafourche Parish, Louisiana.

== Early life ==
William Murrell was born enslaved in Georgetown, South Carolina, the son of Rebecca (last name unknown) and his mother's owner Peter Murrell. His ownership was transferred and he was sold on several occasions which moved him to various Southern states, including Alabama.

== Family ==
His son, William Murrell Jr., was born enslaved in Georgia and represented Madison Parish in the Louisiana House of Representatives from for two terms during Reconstruction era.

== Career ==
Prior to 1865, Murrell Sr.’s ministerial work was performed for the African Methodist Episcopal Church and the Methodist Episcopal Church, South denominations. On December 25, 1865, Mississippi Mission Conference was held, hosted by the Methodist Episcopal Church. At the conference they invited twelve ministers including Murrell and placed them on missions in one of three states including Mississippi, Louisiana and Texas. Murrell was placed on his mission in Thibodaux, Louisiana. Murrell Sr. helped establish several churches, including in Houma, Woodlawn, Napoleonville, and Pineville.

Murrell Sr. served several terms during the Reconstruction era representing Lafourche in the Louisiana House of Representatives.
