= Peter Lawson (cricketer) =

English cricketer

Personal information
- Full name: Peter James Lawson
- Born: 11 September 1981 (age 45); Barrow-in-Furness, Cumbria, England
- Batting: Right-handed
- Bowling: Right-arm medium-fast

Domestic team information
- Years: Team
- 2001–2006: Cumberland

Career statistics
| Competition | List A |
|---|---|
| Matches | 25 |
| Runs scored | 35 |
| Batting average | 7.00 |
| 100s/50s | –/– |
| Top score | 9* |
| Balls bowled | 1385 |
| Wickets | 35 |
| Bowling average | 21.31 |
| 5 wickets in innings | 1 |
| 10 wickets in match | – |
| Best bowling | 5/58 |
| Catches/stumpings | 19/– |
- Source: Cricinfo, 28 March 2011

Peter James Lawson (born 11 September 1981) is an English cricketer. Lawson is a right-handed batsman who bowls right-arm medium-fast. He was born in Barrow-in-Furness, Cumbria.

Lawson made his debut for Cumberland in the 2000 Minor Counties Championship against Lincolnshire, with Williams playing Minor Counties Championship cricket for Cumberland to 2003 and MCCA Knockout Trophy cricket to 2006. In his time with Cumberland, Lawson played three List A matches against the Worcestershire Cricket Board in the 1st round of the 2002 Cheltenham & Gloucester Trophy which was held in 2001, the Nottinghamshire Cricket Board and Devon in the 1st and 2nd round's respectively of the 2003 Cheltenham & Gloucester Trophy, with both matches held in 2002. In his three List A matches, he scored 9 runs at a batting average of 9.00, with a high score of 9. Lawson's only List A wicket was that Devon batsman David Court. Although, this wicket across his three matches cost 107.00 runs.

He also played for the Leicestershire Second XI in 2002.
