= Attorney General Lawson =

Attorney General Lawson may refer to:

- George Leake (1856–1902), Attorney-General of Western Australia
- George Walpole Leake (1825–1895), Attorney-General of Western Australia
