= Tom Lawson (ice hockey) =

Canadian ice hockey player

- Born: August 15, 1979 (age 46) Whitby, Ontario, Canada
- Height: 6 ft 5 in (196 cm)
- Weight: 190 lb (86 kg; 13 st 8 lb)
- Position: Goaltender
- Caught: Left
- Played for: Cincinnati Mighty Ducks; Hershey Bears; Lowell Lock Monsters; Lukko Rauma; HC CSKA Moscow; HC Sibir Novosibirsk; Leksands IF
- NHL draft: Undrafted
- Playing career: 2000–2010

Tom Lawson (born August 15, 1979) is a Canadian former professional ice hockey goaltender. He has since served as a goaltending coach at St. Andrew's College in Aurora, Ontario.

== Playing career ==
Born in Whitby, Ontario, Lawson attending Henry Street High School and played junior hockey for the Markham Waxers hockey organization in 1998-99. He then joined Bowling Green State in Ohio and played for the hockey team on a scholarship as a freshman during the 1999–2000 season. He turned professional the next year with the Knoxville Speed of the United Hockey League and made his American Hockey League debut in a single contest with the Cincinnati Mighty Ducks.

In the 2002–03 season, Lawson was the starting goaltender for the Fort Wayne Komets and recorded a banner year in claiming the UHL Championship. He was selected as the league's best goaltender, playoff MVP and earning a place in the UHL First-All-Star Team. In the off-season, Lawson was signed to an NHL contract by the Colorado Avalanche.

Lawson was assigned to the Avalanche's AHL affiliate, the Hershey Bears for the 2003–04 season. He appeared in a career high 32 AHL games for 13 wins and 2.30 goals against average. He remained with the Avalanche affiliations for the next two seasons with the Bears and the Lowell Lock Monsters.

In the 2006–07 season, Lawson embarked on pursuing a European career and signed a one-year deal with Lukko Rauma in the Finnish SM-liiga. He then moved to Russia, signing as the starting goaltender for the 2007–08 season with CSKA Moscow (the "Red Army Team") of the Russian Superleague. Becoming the first Canadian to feature in goal for the Red Army, Lawson led the RSL in wins, shutouts and games played.

After his successful stint with the Red Army, Lawson signed a two-year contract with Sibir Novosibirsk for the inaugural season of the new top level Russian tier, the Kontinental Hockey League (KHL). Lawson appeared in 59 games in the KHL over his two seasons with Novosibirsk before he was released by the club on January 15, 2010. Nearing the end of the 2009–10, on January 26, 2010, he moved to Sweden to finish his professional career with Leksands IF of the second tier HockeyAllsvenskan.

== Personal ==
Lawson has a wife and three kids, and resides in Aurora, Ontario. Post playing career he became a fire-fighter for the town of Ajax, Ontario while owning and running a development hockey program, Lawson Goaltending Hockey School. He serves as the goalie coach to St. Andrew's College Varsity hockey team in Aurora. His brother-in-law is former professional hockey player, Ryan Murphy. He is also a part of the Murphy Hockey School program.

== Career statistics ==
			Regular season									Playoffs
Season	Team	League	GP	W	L	T/OT	MIN	GA	SO	GAA	SV%	GP	W	L	MIN	GA	SO	GAA	SV%
1998–99	Markham Waxers	OPJHL	32	19	10	2	1793	101	0	3.38	.908	—	—	—	—	—	—	—	—
1999–00	Bowling Green State U.	CCHA	3	0	3	0	173	14	0	4.86	.865	—	—	—	—	—	—	—	—
2000–01	Knoxville Speed	UHL	35	16	16	2	2002	116	0	3.48	.899	1	—	—	—	—	—	—	—
2000–01	Cincinnati Mighty Ducks	AHL	1	0	0	0	23	1	0	2.58	.900	—	—	—	—	—	—	—	—
2001–02	Anchorage Aces	WCHL	1	1	0	0	54	2	0	2.22	.949	—	—	—	—	—	—	—	—
2002–03	Fort Wayne Komets	UHL	56	29	15	10	3178	106	7	2.00	.917	12	11	1	750	21	2	1.68	.935
2003–04	Hershey Bears	AHL	32	13	12	2	1693	65	4	2.30	.932	—	—	—	—	—	—	—	—
2003–04	Reading Royals	ECHL	2	0	2	0	120	10	0	5.02	.833	—	—	—	—	—	—	—	—
2004–05	Hershey Bears	AHL	27	10	14	0	1478	70	2	2.84	.914	—	—	—	—	—	—	—	—
2005–06	San Diego Gulls	ECHL	30	14	14	2	1751	84	2	2.88	.909	—	—	—	—	—	—	—	—
2005–06	Lowell Lock Monsters	AHL	7	1	3	1	367	20	0	3.27	.893	—	—	—	—	—	—	—	—
2006–07	Lukko	SM-l	29	13	11	5	1717	87	1	3.04	.914	3	1	2	176	8	0	2.73	.904
2007–08	CSKA Moscow	RSL	52	—	—	—	—	114	6	2.22	.918	6	—	—	—	14	1	2.64	.919
2008–09	HC Sibir Novosibirsk	KHL	37	13	19	4	2162	95	2	2.64	.902	—	—	—	—	—	—	—	—
2009–10	HC Sibir Novosibirsk	KHL	22	4	13	3	1125	68	1	3.63	.874	—	—	—	—	—	—	—	—
2009–10	Leksands IF	Allsv	7	—	—	—	—	—	—	2.77	.897	—	—	—	—	—	—	—	—
AHL totals			67	24	29	3	3561	156	6	2.62	.920	—	—	—	—	—	—	—	—

== Awards and honours ==
Award	Year
UHL
Best Goaltender	2002–03
First All-Star Team	2002–03
Playoff MVP	2002–03
Champion (Fort Wayne Komets)	2002–03
