= Noel Lawson =

New Zealand cricketer

Personal information
- Full name: Alfred Noel Lawson
- Born: 25 December 1912; Dunedin, New Zealand
- Died: 22 November 1974 (aged 61); Wellington, New Zealand
- Role: Wicket-keeper

Domestic team information
- Years: Team
- 1944/45: Otago
- Source: ESPNcricinfo, 15 May 2016

Alfred Noel Lawson (25 December 1912 – 22 November 1974) was a New Zealand cricketer, sports administrator and radio commentator. He played two first-class matches for Otago in the 1944–45 season.

Noel Lawson was born at Dunedin on Christmas Day 1912 and educated at Otago Boys' High School in the city. He studied at the University of Otago and captained University Cricket Club before moving to the Kaikorai club. He developed a reputation as a "sound type of wicketkeeper-batsman", and first played for an Otago XI in December 1937, keeping wickets in a one-day match against North Otago. He played again for the team in a 1939 one-day match against Southland.

After the established Otago wicket-keeper George Mills was unable to travel to Christchurch to play in the first of Otago's two representative matches scheduled for the Christmas period in 1944, and with Ash Cutler unable to deputise, Lawson was called into the team as his replacement, The Evening Star considering that he "shapes well with the gloves". He was surprisingly retained as the team's wicket-keeper for the second match, with Mills playing as an outfielder. The Otago Daily Times questioned the selection, doubting whether Lawson's batting would have justified his inclusion in the team―Lawson scored only seven runs in his two first-class matches―and preferred that a specialist batsman would have been selected. In the event he "kept wickets particularly well", despite some "erratic" throws in to the wickets from Otago, and allowed no byes in Wellington's first innings.

Lawson was called up to the armed forces in 1942 and served overseas in the Royal New Zealand Army Ordnance Corps―he was overseas when his daughter was born in 1943. He graduated in 1945 with a degree in commerce and worked as an accountant and a company secretary.

Lawson continued to play club cricket and for Otago teams into the 1950s, managed teams and was a selector for Otago and the secretary of Pirates RFC in Dunedin. He was "well known" as a cricket broadcaster on Radio New Zealand, covering domestic matches from Wellington. He died at Wellington in 1974 aged 61. An obituary was published in the New Zealand Cricket Almanack the following year.
