= Joseph Lawson (cricketer) =

English cricketer

Joseph Lawson (13 November 1893 – 17 April 1969), was an English cricketer who played for Gloucestershire. He was born in Stroud, Gloucestershire and died in Wellington, New Zealand.

Lawson made a single first-class appearance for the team, during the 1914 season, against Northamptonshire. From the lower-middle order, he scored three runs in the first innings in which he batted, and a single run in the second, as Gloucestershire lost the match by an innings margin.
