= Lawson =

Lawson may refer to:

== Places ==
=== Australia ===
- Lawson, Australian Capital Territory, a suburb of Canberra
- Lawson, New South Wales, a town in the Blue Mountains
- Mount Lawson (Queensland)

=== Canada ===
- Lawson, Saskatchewan, a hamlet
- Lawson Sector, a sector in Saskatoon, Saskatchewan
- Lawson Island, Nunavut
- Mount Lawson (disambiguation)

=== United States ===
- Lawson, Arkansas, an unincorporated community and census-designated place
- Lawson, Colorado, an unincorporated community
- Lawson, Missouri, a city
- Lawson, Mesquite, Texas, a former unincorporated community, now part of Mesquite
- Balmoral, Wisconsin, an unincorporated community previously known as Lawson
- Lawson Peak (California), a mountain
- Mount Lawson (Washington)
- Lawson Army Airfield, Fort Benning, Georgia, United States

=== Antarctica ===
- Lawson Nunatak, Mac. Robertson Land
- Lawson Nunataks, Oates Land

== People and fictional characters ==
- Lawson (surname), a list of people and fictional characters
- Lawson (given name), a list of people

== Music ==
- Lawson (band), a British pop rock band
  - Lawson (EP), a 2015 EP by the band
- Lawson (album), a 2005 album by John Schumann and the Vagabond Crew

== Schools ==
- Lawson State Community College, a public, historically black community college in Alabama, United States
- Sam H. Lawson Middle School, Cupertino, California, United States
- The Lawson Academy, Houston, Texas, United States, a charter middle school
- Lord Lawson of Beamish Academy (formerly Lord Lawson of Beamish Community School), a coeducational secondary school and sixth form in Birtley, County Durham, England

== Ships ==
- HMS Lawson, an American-built British Royal Navy frigate 1943–1946
- USCGC Lawrence Lawson, a United States Coast Guard cutter
- Thomas W. Lawson (ship), a schooner built in 1902 and destroyed in 1907

== Transport ==
- Lawson Airplane Company-Continental Faience and Tile Company, a historic demolished factory complex in Milwaukee, Wisconsin, United States
  - Lawson L-2, a 1920s biplane airliner
  - Lawson L-4, a 1920 biplane airliner designed for long-distance flights
- Lawson railway station, Lawson, New South Wales, Australia

== Other uses ==
- Lawson (play), a 1943 Australian play by Oriel Gray
- Lawson (store), a convenience store chain headquartered in Japan
- Lawson Software, a company acquired by Infor
- Lawson baronets, two titles in the Baronetage of England and four in the Baronetage of the United Kingdom, two of them extant
- Lawson Adit, a horizontal mine tunnel on the University of California, Berkeley campus
- Lawson Apartments, Perth, Western Australia
- Lawson Arena, Western Michigan University, Kalamazoo, Michigan, United States
- Lawson Tower, Scituate Center, Massachusetts, United States, on the National Register of Historic Places

== See also ==
- Lawson criterion, a figure of merit in nuclear fusion research
- Lawsone, a naphthoquinone dye from henna
- Lausen, a Swiss municipality
- Jean de Lauson (1584–1666), Governor of New France
- Lauzon (disambiguation)
