= University of California, Berkeley student housing =

Coordinates: 37.8678°N 122.2552°W

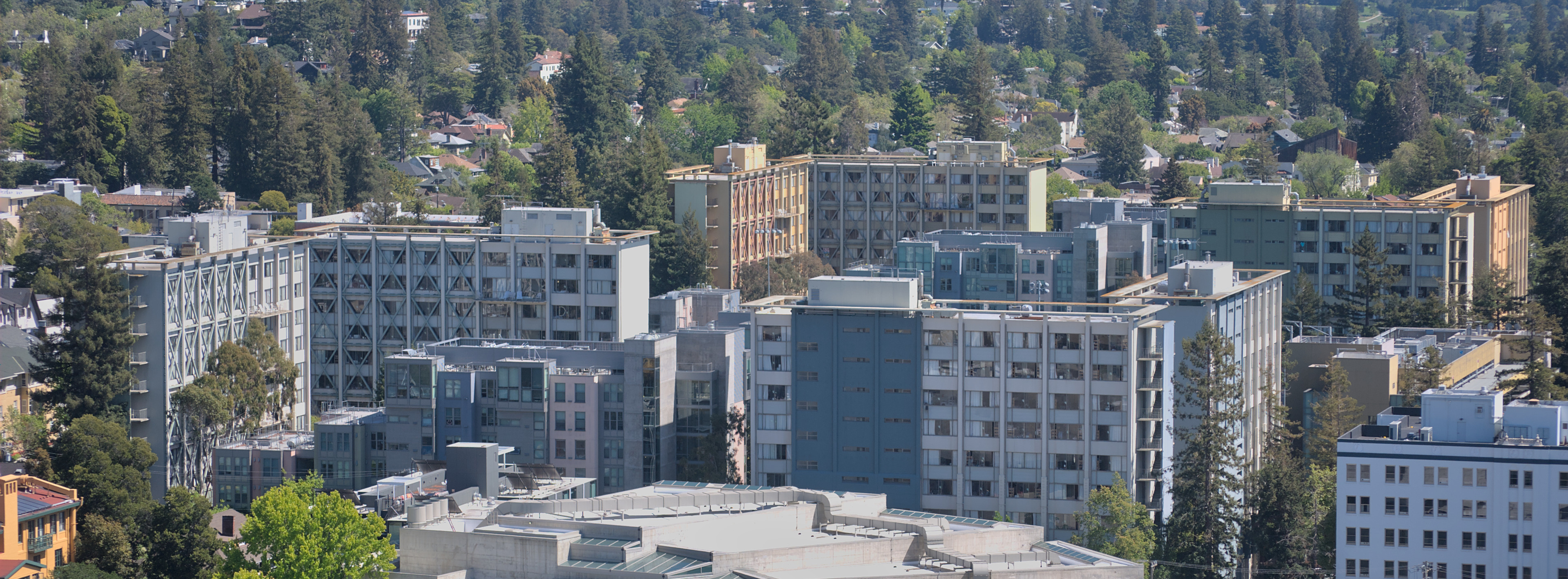
Residence Halls Unit 1 and Unit 2 in 2022

Housing at the University of California, Berkeley, includes student housing facilities run by the office of Residential and Student Service Programs (RSSP). Housing is also offered by off-campus entities such as fraternities and sororities and the Berkeley Student Cooperative (BSC).

== History ==
University of California, Berkeley student housing
- Residence halls
- Apartments
- Unaffiliated
1 Unit 1 (Cheney | Christian | Freeborn | Putnam | Slottman | Deutsch)
2 Unit 2 (Cunningham | Towle | Davidson | Griffiths | Wada | Ehrman)
3 Unit 3 (Norton | Spens-Black | Priestly | Ida Sproul | Beverly Cleary)
4 Unit 4 (Stern | Foothill)
5 Unit 5 (Clark Kerr)
6 David Blackwell
7 Martinez Commons
8 Channing-Bowditch
9 Enclave
10 Helen Diller Anchor House
11 Ida L. Jackson
12 Intersection (Emeryville)
13 Manville
14 New Sequoia
15 Panoramic Berkeley
16 University Village (Albany)
17 International House Berkeley
18 Bowles Hall
19 Berkeley Student Cooperative (Casa Zimbabwe)

Historically, the University of California adhered to the traditions of the great German research universities, and as part of that, largely refrained from providing housing for students for over 80 years after its 1868 founding. By the fall of 1954, only 4.8% of UC Berkeley students were housed in university-operated residence halls, while the equivalent number at archrival Stanford University was 36.0%. Nearly all the student body and some of the faculty had to fend for themselves in seeking space in privately operated rooming houses in surrounding cities, many of which were in very poor condition.

When Clark Kerr became the first chancellor of UC Berkeley in 1952, he became aware of a tacit understanding under which the university had traditionally refrained from competing against privately operated housing and dining facilities, and that conservative members of the Board of Regents had traditionally regarded university-operated housing as tantamount to "socialism." To compete against Stanford, the Ivy League, and the Big Ten for the brightest American students, Kerr worked to shift UC Berkeley from the German model to the English model in which universities take responsibility for providing and operating student housing. In August 1956, he secured approval from the Board of Regents of a long-range development plan which included the construction of several high-rise residence halls.

== University housing and dining facilities ==
=== Residence Halls ===
The high-rise buildings of Units 1 (1960), 2 (1960), and 3 (1964) were designed by John Carl Warnecke; each unit as first completed in the 1960s had four tall buildings surrounding a courtyard with common facilities, including a ground-level dining area above a mail room, recreation room, and office structure. Since their completion, new residential buildings have been added and the dining commons for Units 1 and 2 have been consolidated in the block separating the two complexes. Some of the newest residence hall buildings are at Units 1, 2, and 3.

Each nine-story building is named after alumni or faculty and were originally designed for single-sex occupancy and configured with a ground floor lobby and recreation room. Each room on the floor was a double or triple occupancy.

Units 1, 2, and 3 have since become co-ed although there are single-sex floors in many of the buildings. As a result of the 1989 Loma Prieta earthquake, additional cross bracing was added to the exteriors of the older highrise Unit 1 and 2 buildings.

Selected residence halls host Theme Programs, where students with common identities and interests can live together; students who choose to live in Theme Program communities are required to enroll in theme-specific courses. Current theme programs and locations include:

Theme Programs at UC Berkeley residence halls
Theme	Name	Unit	Hall
African-American culture	AATP	1	Christian
Asian American culture	Bloom	2	Cunningham
Mexican, Chicanx, Latinx culture	Casa Magdalena Mora (CASA)	3	Beverly Cleary
Sustainable living	Global Environment Theme House (GETH)	5	Clark Kerr
Native American culture	NATP	1	Slottman
South Asian, Southwest Asian, and North African culture	SSWANA	2	Cunningham
LGBTQ+ community	UNITY	3	Spens-Black
Female-identified students in science, technology, engineering, arts, and mathematics	Empowering Womxn in STEAM (WISE)	4	Stern

Residence Halls at Berkeley

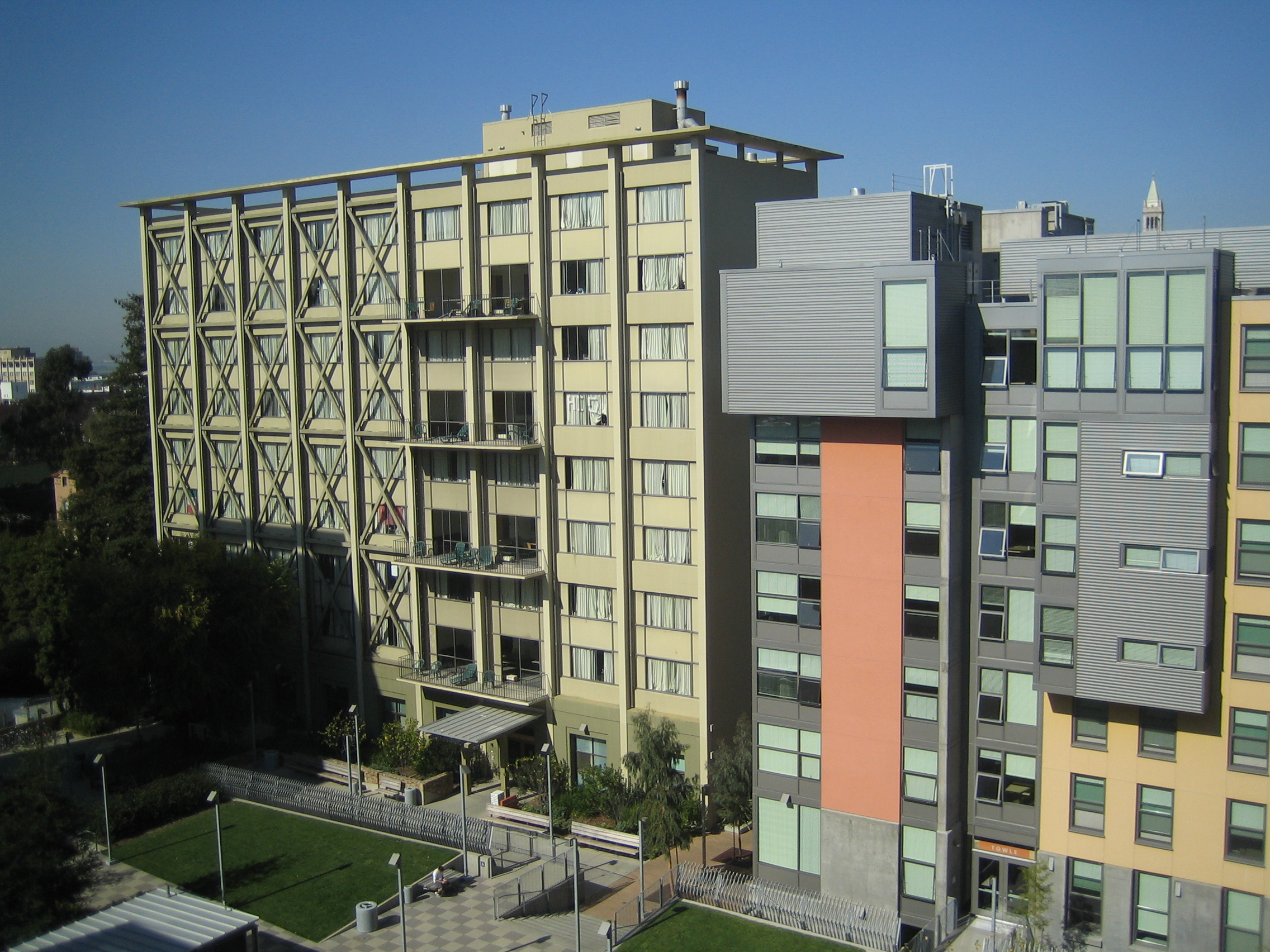
Cunningham Hall and Towle Hall (Unit 2)

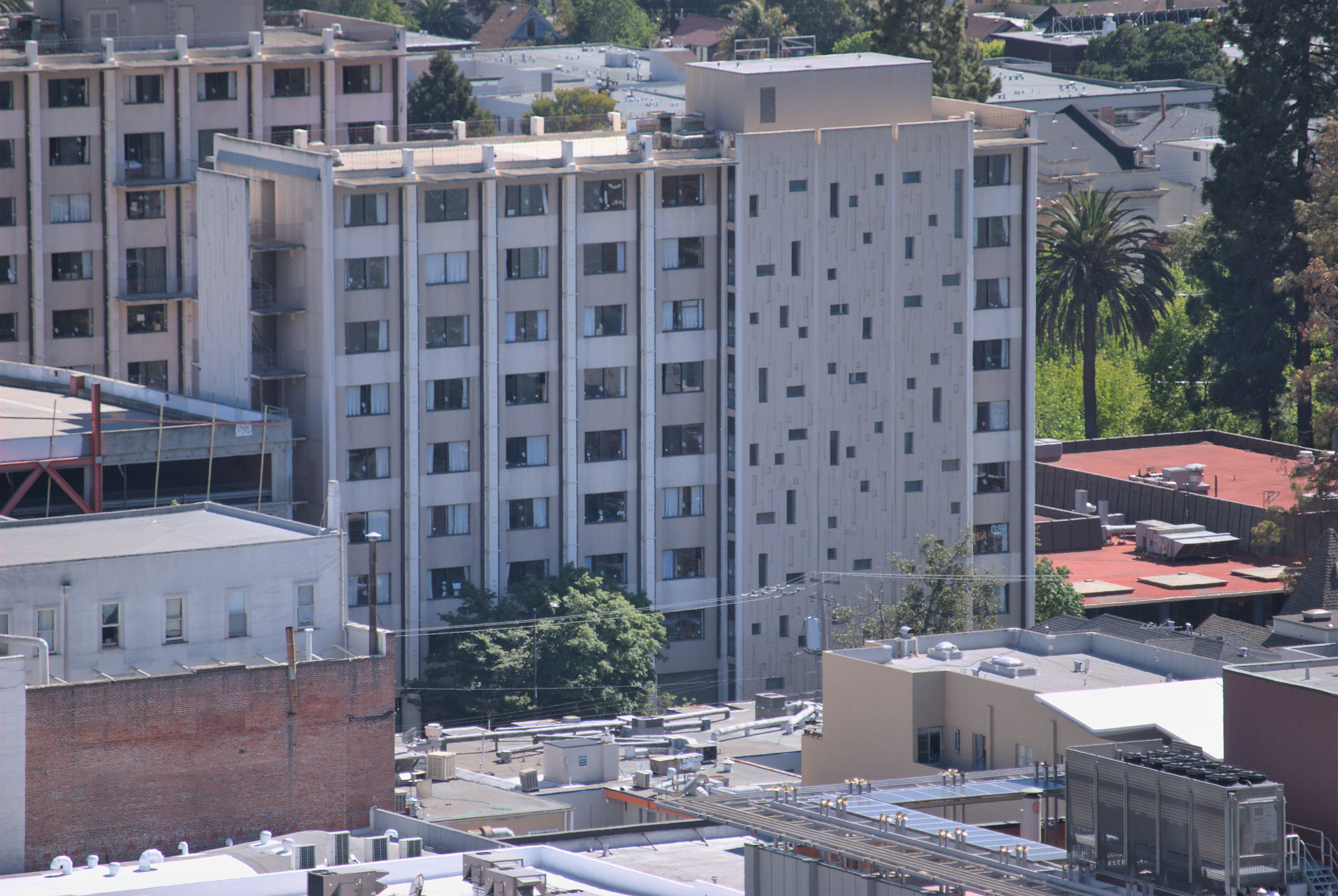
Spens-Black Hall (Unit 3)

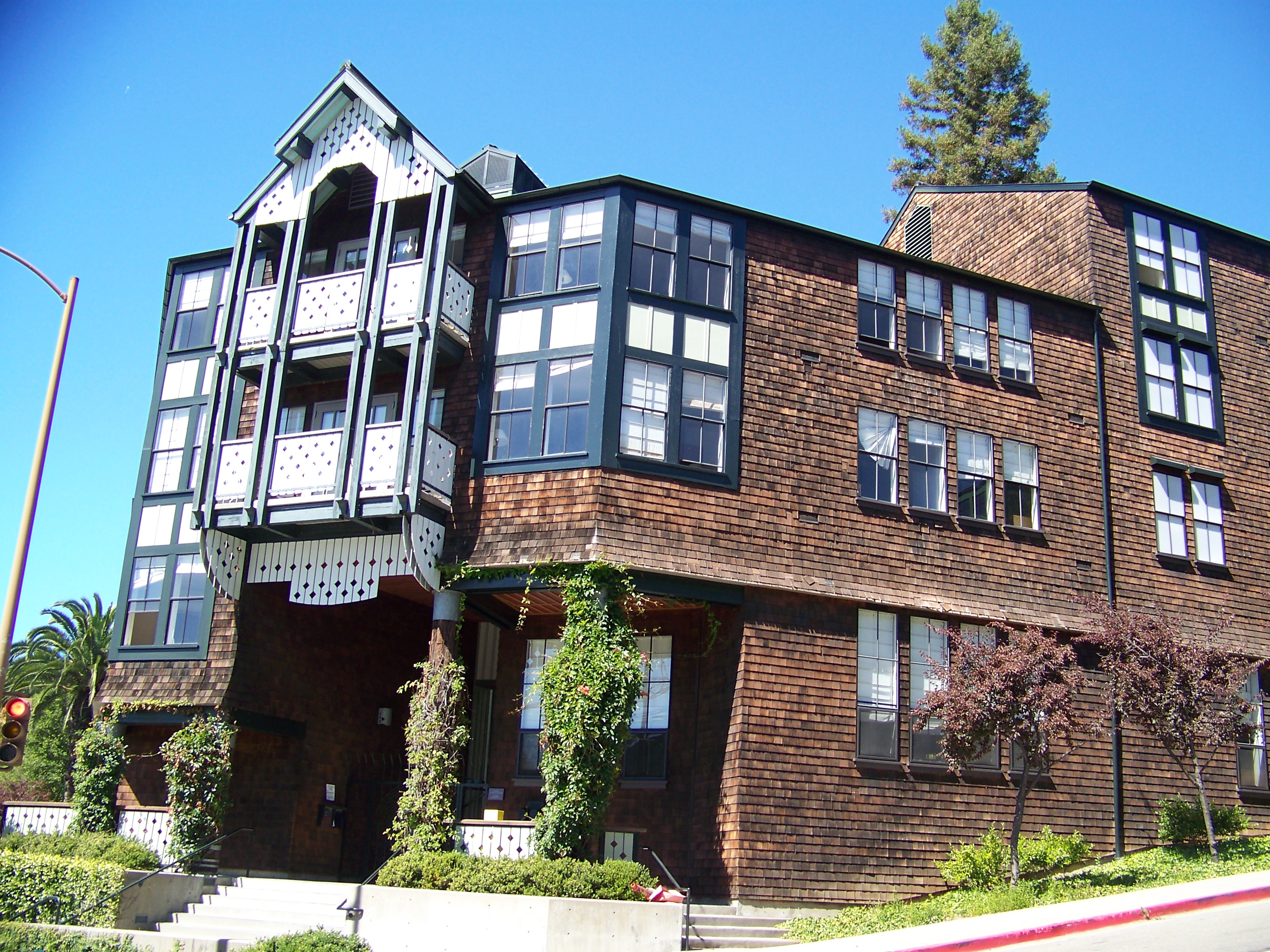
Foothill - La Loma (Unit 4)

==== Unit 1 ====
The six main buildings of Unit 1 (completed in 1960) are located at 2650 Durant Avenue. These include the four original highrise buildings with eight residential floors each: Cheney, Deutsch, Freeborn, and Putnam; each floor has a mixture of double and triple rooms with a shared, communal bathroom, and each building has a total of approximately 230 beds. In addition, there are the newer Christian and Slottman Halls (completed in 2005), which house two-bedroom mini-suites with a shared bathroom for four people per suite. The unit's primary dining hall is Crossroads, also known as "Croads," which it shares with Unit 2. Underneath the central quad, there is an exercise room, music practice room, mail room, and a computer lab.

==== Unit 2 ====
The main buildings of Unit 2 (completed in 1960) are located at 2650 Haste Street. It consists of the original four highrise buildings: Cunningham, Davidson, Ehrman, and Griffiths Halls, sharing the same general configuration as Unit 1 (eight residential floors with double and triple rooms and a total of approximately 230 beds each), as well as the newer Towle Hall with two-bedroom, four-person mini-suites, and the Wada Hall apartments, both completed in 2005. The unit's primary dining hall is Crossroads, known as "Croads" by students, which it shares with Unit 1. Like Unit 1, Unit 2 has an exercise room, music practice room, mail room, and computer lab underground.

==== Unit 3 ====
Unit 3 (completed in 1964) is located at 2400 Durant Avenue. The original buildings are Ida Sproul, Norton, Priestly, and Spens-Black Halls, sharing the general design and layout with Units 1 and 2. Beverly Cleary Hall, completed in 1992, is located across Channing Way and is part of the unit. The unit's main dining facility, Café 3, is located in the center of the original building complex.

==== Unit 4 ====
Unit 4 consists of Stern Hall and Foothill Student Housing at 2700 Hearst Avenue. Bowles Hall (completed in 1929) was also part of Unit 4 until May 2015. The unit is located on the eastern edge of campus along Gayley Road. Its main dining facility is located in Foothill.

Stern Hall, built in 1942, is the only all-female residence hall on campus. It has a mixture of residence hall-style rooms with single, double, and triple occupancy and shared bathrooms, and suites with double bedrooms. It is located adjacent to Foothill.

Foothill was completed in 1990 and consists of the Hillside and La Loma complexes with a total of seven residential buildings. It is a coed residence hall popular among engineering students due to its proximity to the College of Engineering on the north side of campus. All rooms are arranged in suites with a total of three to eleven bedrooms each; each bedroom has single, double, triple, or quadruple occupancy.

Bowles was considered initially as the campus for the executive education program at the Haas School of Business, but this reuse was ruled out as contrary to the spirit in which it was funded.

Unit 4 is the only unit to not be certified ADA accessible.

==== Clark Kerr Campus (Unit 5) ====
Clark Kerr Campus at 2601 Warring Street is a Spanish mission style residential complex located 5 blocks southeast of the main Berkeley campus. Student housing includes both residential halls and suites with single, double, triple, or quadruple accommodation bedrooms. Formerly the California Schools for the Deaf and Blind, completed in 1949, the City of Berkeley and the University of California fought for the land when the school relocated in 1980. The university won the majority of the land in court and opened the converted residence hall in 1983. The campus, which was listed on the National Register of Historic Places in 1982, has its own dining hall as well as a pool, tennis court and volleyball courts.

==== David Blackwell Hall ====
At its opening on July 21, 2018, the 185,000 ft^{2} (17,200 m^{2}) David Blackwell Hall at 2401 Durant Avenue had 412 rooms that could house 777 residents. The hall was named after David Blackwell, the first black tenured professor of the university. The bedrooms are mostly double occupancy, with a few single rooms. It features amenities such as a fitness center, patios, gaming rooms, study areas, presentations rooms, lounges, and laundry rooms. There is no dining hall within Blackwell Hall, but residents' meal plans can be used at the nearby Café 3. Priority for housing at the hall is given to returning sophomores and upperclassmen.

=== University-owned apartments ===
Berkeley owns several apartment facilities, aimed at continuing, transfer, and graduate students. The apartments are considered "off-campus living" for financial aid purposes. Unlike residence halls, tenants of the apartments pay monthly rent, rather than semester fees, and are not automatically included on the campus meal plan.

==== Channing-Bowditch Apartments ====
The Channing-Bowditch Apartments, completed in 2004 at 2535 Channing Way (at the intersection with Bowditch) are open to upperclassmen and transfers. There are 228 beds in total, arranged in 52 units with four beds each (2×2-bedroom units with a shared bathroom), 3 units with four beds each (4×1-bedroom), and 2 townhouses with five beds each (four bedrooms, each with single or double occupancy). They house 226 students and were completed in 2003.

==== Enclave Apartments ====
Opening in Fall of 2020, the Enclave Apartments are located at 2503 Haste Street, three blocks south of campus. Housing at Enclave is eligible to continuing and transfer undergraduate students. Bedrooms consist of singles and doubles, arranged in four- to seven-person apartments. The Enclave Apartments are distinguished visually by a bouldery exterior design.

==== Helen Diller Anchor House ====
At its opening on August 21, 2024, the 450,000 ft^{2} (42,000 m^{2}) Helen Diller Anchor House at 1950 Oxford Street had 244 rooms that could house 772 residents. The hall was named after the Helen Diller Family Foundation, which donated 300 million dollars for its construction. The bedrooms are mostly quadruple occupancy, with a few triple, double, and single rooms. It features amenities such as a fitness center, patios, gaming rooms, study areas, presentations rooms, lounges, retail space, and laundry rooms. There is no dining hall within the apartments, but residents' meal plans can be used at the nearby Brown's Cafe. Housing at the apartments is exclusively given to transfer students.

==== Ida L. Jackson Graduate House ====
Jackson House, completed in 2002 at 2333 College Avenue contains apartments open to graduate students. It has a capacity of 120, in two-, three-, four-, five-, or six-bedroom apartments. Both Jackson and Channing-Bowditch were designed by PYATOK, which also handled the renovation of Bowles Hall.

==== Intersection Apartments ====
The Intersection Apartments are at 3800 San Pablo Avenue in Emeryville, approximately 3 mi (4.8 km) south of campus. There are studio, junior one-bedroom, one bed/one bath, two bed/one bath, two bed/two bath, and four bed/three bathroom apartments; all offer single-occupancy bedrooms and are fully furnished.

==== Manville Apartments ====
The Manville Apartments at 2100 Channing Way are prioritized for law and graduate students. There are 132 single-occupancy studio apartments.

==== Martinez Commons ====
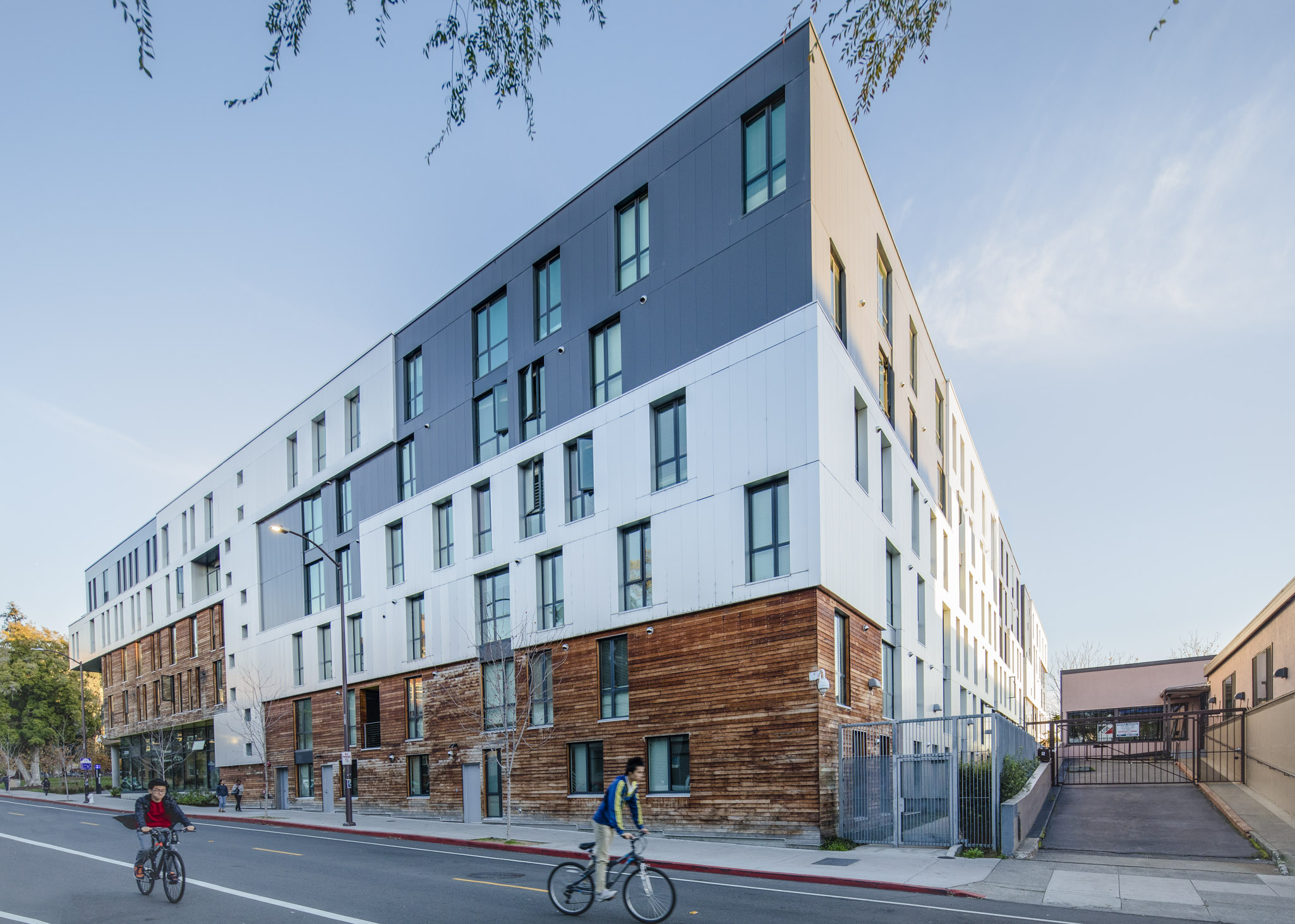
Martinez Commons in 2016

The Maximino Martinez Commons at 2520 Channing Way contains both residence hall rooms and apartments. There are 52 apartments in total, 47 four-bedroom and 5 five-bedroom, each of which are single-occupancy and single-gender. Priority is given to sophomores, upperclassmen, and incoming transfer students.

==== New Sequoia Apartments ====
The New Sequoia Apartments at 2441 Haste Street houses 116 students in 42 fully furnished apartments: 1 bedroom/1 bath (two beds total), 2 bedroom/1 bath (two beds total), and 2 bedroom/1 bath (four beds total).

==== Panoramic Berkeley Apartments ====
The Panoramic Berkeley Apartments at 2539 Telegraph Avenue are considered on-campus housing, and nine-month leases are available for undergraduates. The apartments are 4 bedroom/1.5 bath, 4 bedroom/1 bath, and 5 bedroom/1.5 bath, all single-occupancy.

==== Wada Apartments ====
The Wada Apartments are within Unit 2 at 2650 Haste Street; they also are considered on-campus housing and leases are limited to ten months. Each apartment has two or three bedrooms, and the bedrooms are double or triple occupancy.

=== Family housing ===
Students with families are eligible to live in University Village's East or West Village. development.

==== University Village ====
University Village is a housing community for married students. It is located within the city limits of Albany about two miles (3 km) northwest of the main Berkeley campus. The demolition of older buildings and their subsequent replacement with new, more expensive apartment units has prompted student protests. The Village Residents Association, a funding and advocacy group in University Village, filmed a video documentary regarding the lack of affordable student family housing in June 2007.

==== Smyth-Fernwald ====
Southeast of the Berkeley campus, the Smyth-Fernwald site is roughly a ten- to fifteen-minute walk to the main campus. Before its complete demolition in March 2013, the complex had two- and three-bedroom apartments, and housed 74 families.

The complex included a multipurpose building, with the western section containing offices and a community center. In 1999, due to creep structural damage and safety concerns, some complex buildings south of the multipurpose building were demolished.

== Non-university housing ==
There are several large residences offering student housing, not affiliated with the university.

=== International House ===
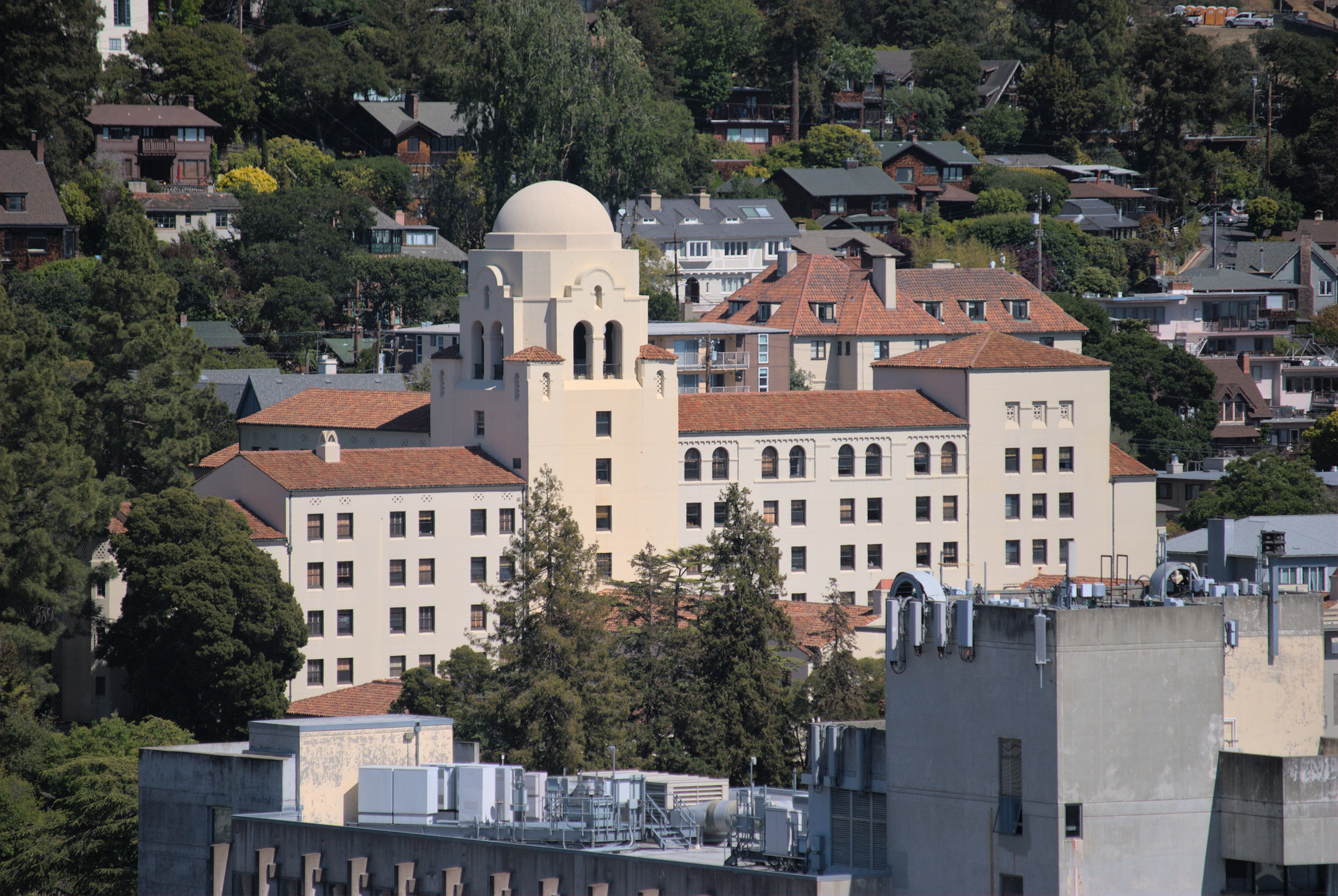
The International House as viewed from Sather Tower in 2022

The International House (or I-House) is located at the intersection of Bancroft and Piedmont. It is home to many of Berkeley's international students, with half international and half American residents. The International House is an independent, self-supporting non-profit organization that has close associations with the university. International House Berkeley officially opened on August 18, 1930. It was the largest student housing complex in the Bay Area and the first coeducational residence west of the Mississippi.

=== Bowles Hall ===
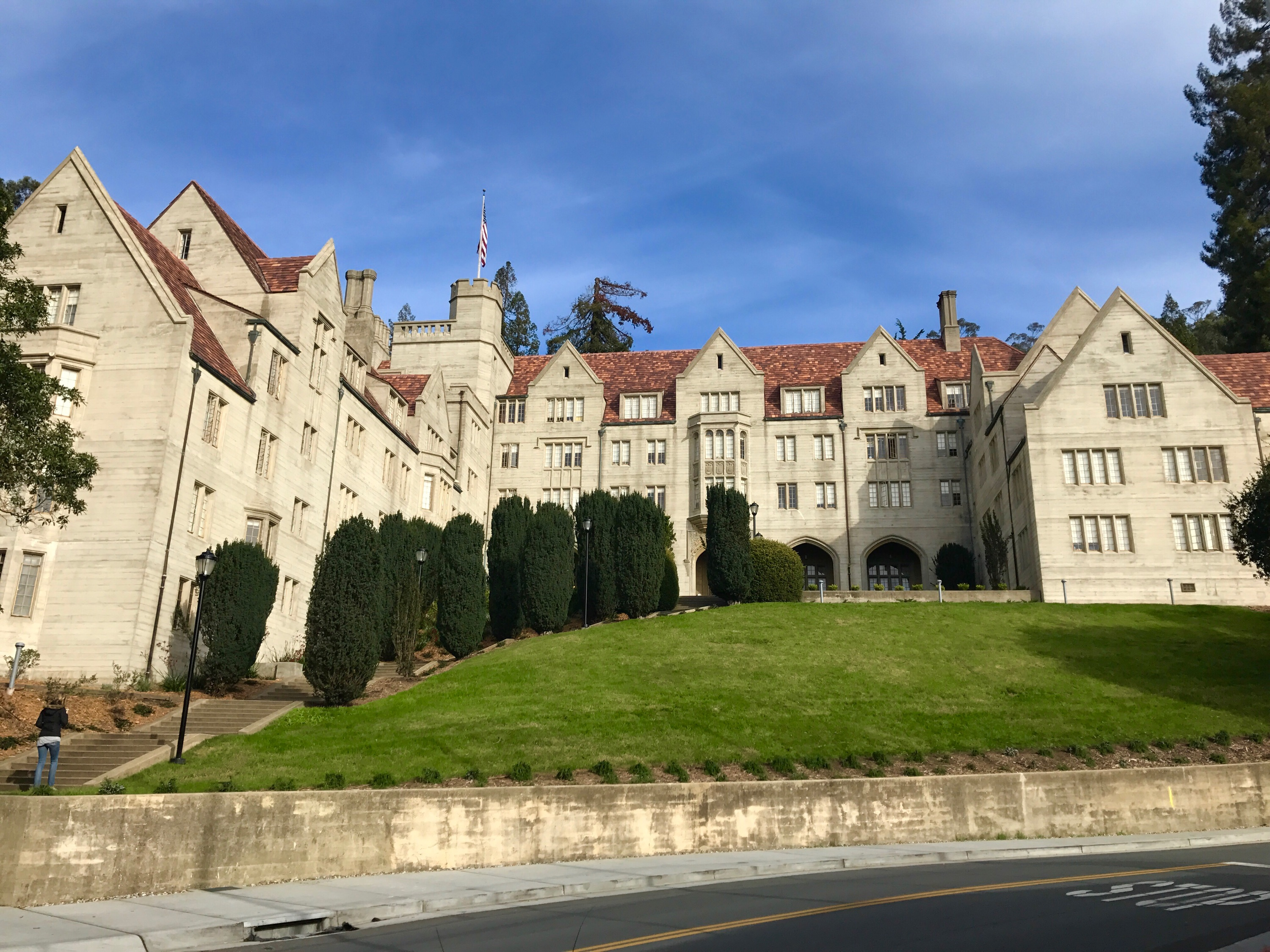
Bowles Hall in 2016

Bowles Hall was built in 1928 as a residential college, the first in the United States. It later became a standard Berkeley residence hall. After remodeling and reorganization by a group of Bowles Hall alumni, it reopened as a coed residential college housing students from all four undergraduate years.

=== Berkeley Student Cooperative ===
The Berkeley Student Cooperative (BSC) (formerly known as the University Students' Cooperative Association (USCA)) is a nonprofit student housing cooperative controlled by its student membership. The BSC primarily serves UC Berkeley students, though full-time students from any accredited institution of higher education are eligible for membership (i.e. a room and/or board contract). The BSC houses approximately 1250 students in 20 properties (17 of which it owns and three of which it leases from UC Berkeley), while other members have boarding-only (i.e. meal plan) contracts. The BSC is legally independent of the university, with their only legal relationship being the aforementioned ground leases.

The BSC is significantly less expensive than both private housing and UC Berkeley-run housing (for both housing-only contracts and food and housing contracts). The BSC keeps rents low in part by requiring its members to perform "workshift" (essentially chores), usually 5 hours per week at most properties. Other methods of keeping rents low include bulk purchasing and the lack of a for-profit landlord.

The BSC offers priority to students in the UC Berkeley Educational Opportunity Program (EOP) (or equivalent at their respective college or university), students with disabilities, transfer students, undocumented students, and international students studying abroad at a University of California campus.
