= Lawson (given name) =

Lawson is a masculine given name borne by:

- Lawson Aschenbach (born 1983), American racing driver
- Lawson Butt (1880–1956), British actor and director of the silent era
- Lawson Craddock (born 1992), American former road and track racing cyclist
- Lawson Crouse (born 1997), Canadian ice hockey player in the National Hockey League
- Lawson D'Ath (born 1992), English footballer
- Lawson Duncan (born 1964), American retired tennis player
- Lawson D. Franklin (1804–1861), American planter, slave trader and businessman
- Lawson Harris (1897–1948), American director, actor, producer and writer
- Lawson Harvey (1856–1920), American lawyer, politician and justice of the Indiana Supreme Court
- Lawson Humphries (born 2003), Australian rules footballer
- Lawson Fusao Inada (born 1938), Japanese-American poet
- Lawson Insley, 19th century daguerreotyptist in Australia and New Zealand
- Lawson Little (1910–1968), American golfer
- Lawson Luckie (born 2004), American football player
- Lawson Oyekan (born 1961), British-Nigerian contemporary ceramic sculptor
- Lawson P. Ramage (1909–1990), United States Navy vice admiral and Medal of Honor recipient
- Lawson Roll (born 1965), English former cricketer
- Lawson Rollins, American guitarist
- Lawson Sabah (born 1997), Ghanaian footballer
- Lawson Soulsby, Baron Soulsby of Swaffham Prior (1926–2017), British microbiologist and parasitologist
- Lawson Steele (fl. 1872–1874), African-American politician in Alabama during the Reconstruction era
- Lawson Sunderland (born 2001), American soccer player in the Netherlands
- Lawson Tait (1845–1899), Scottish surgical pioneer
- Lawson Thomas (1898–1989), American lawyer and civil rights activist, first African-American judge appointed in the American South since Reconstruction
- Lawson C. Tosh (1879–1954), American politician
- Lawson Vaughn (born 1984), American retired soccer player
- Lawson Wilkins (1894–1963), American pediatric endocrinologist
- Lawson Wood (1878–1957), English painter, illustrator and designer
- Lawson Wulsin (born 1951), American psychiatrist and author
