= Lozon (disambiguation) =

Lozon is a former municipality in Normandy, France.

Lozon may also refer to:

- Lozon (river), a river in Normandy, France, part of the Douve system
- Jeffrey Lozon, Canadian health executive

== See also ==
- Lauzon (disambiguation)
- Luzon, the largest island in the Philippines
