= Henry Roll =

Scottish cricketer

Personal information
- Full name: Henry Trevor Roll
- Born: 18 March 1905; Alloa, Clackmannanshire, Scotland
- Died: 25 May 1967 (aged 62); Downend, Gloucestershire, England
- Batting: Right-handed
- Bowling: Right-arm medium
- Relatives: Lawson Roll (grandson)

Domestic team information
- Years: Team
- 1927: Warwickshire

Career statistics
Competition	First-class
Matches	1
Runs scored	0
Batting average	0.00
100s/50s	–/–
Top score	0
Balls bowled	54
Wickets	–
Bowling average	–
5 wickets in innings	–
10 wickets in match	–
Best bowling	–
Catches/stumpings	1/–
- Source: Cricinfo, 25 December 2011

Henry Trevor Roll (18 March 1905 – 25 May 1967) was a Scottish cricketer. Roll was a right-handed batsman who bowled right-arm medium pace. He was born at Alloa, Clackmannanshire.

Roll made a single first-class appearance for Warwickshire against the touring New Zealanders at Edgbaston in 1927. Roll was dismissed in Warwickshire's first-innings for a duck by Roger Blunt, while in their second-innings he wasn't required to bat. He also bowled nine wicketless overs in the New Zealanders first-innings, with the outcome of the match ending in a draw. This was his only major appearance for Warwickshire.

He died at Downend, Gloucestershire on 25 May 1967. His grandson Lawson Roll played a single first-class match for Gloucestershire in 1984.
