= Stern Hall (Berkeley) =

All-female residence hall at the University of California, Berkeley

Coordinates: 37°52′29.47″N 122°15′19.65″W

Stern Hall is an all-female residence hall at the University of California, Berkeley, constructed and operated by the University. It was built in 1942 on a $258,000 grant from Rosalie Meyer Stern, daughter of Marc Eugene Meyer and widow of Sigmund Stern, class of 1879. It is the sister hall to Bowles Hall, the all-male residence on campus. The Hall was first opened for 90 undergraduate women; currently it houses approximately 267. It is located at Hearst Avenue and Highland Place.

== The Building ==
The Hall was designed by William Wurster, the former dean of the College of Environmental Design. The building has four floors comprising single, double and triple occupancy rooms, with a limited number of suites. Bathrooms are either single-sex or co-ed; all males must announce themselves when entering the co-ed bathrooms. In 1959, a new wing, adding room for 47 more residents, was completed. A second wing was added in 1981.

Stern Hall has a number of notable features: an original Diego Rivera mural entitled "Still Life and Blossoming Almond Trees" is located at the bottom of the spiral staircase leading off from the main lounge, and a painting of Rosalie Meyer Stern hangs in the Stern Library. The library itself contains a valuable collection of French literature, donated by a member of the Stern family.

Stern Hall was built fifty feet to the east of its originally planned location, after investigations in Lawson Adit revealed its original location was seismically unsafe.

== Traditions ==
Stern Hall has had traditions that involve Bowles Hall. Included among these is the annual setup dinner and dance, where the ladies of Stern and the men of Bowles are randomly paired up to enjoy a catered, semi-formal dinner and dance.

In addition, every Thursday night, the men of Bowles trek up fire lane to sing to the ladies of Stern. The serenade begins and ends with the "alakazoo chant," and includes the Bowles Hall Drinking Song and the California Drinking Song. Starting from fall of 2006, the repertoire of songs began to include one Bowlesmen-chosen pop song, different each week. There is also a song written specifically about Stern, the Stern Hall Eating Song, which is now considered to be taboo.

Each semester, a Senior Dinner is held for all graduating seniors residing in Stern. Seniors receive a small farewell gift, and take a customary picture together. Usually the dinner is catered by the dining commons, and often there are open spots for non-seniors as well.

Stern Hall, like all Berkeley residence halls, has a Resident Hall Association, known colloquially as "Hall Ass." Stern Hall Association members are student residential leaders who, along with Residence hall staff, plan activities and events for the residents of Stern Hall in an effort to create a positive living community. Traditionally, the positions on the Stern Hall Association include President, Executive Vice President, Social Vice President, Treasurer, Secretary, Historian, and Publicist. All positions on the Hall Association are elected by the residents of Stern Hall at the beginning of each semester (except for the Treasurer position, which is year-long).
