= Lauzon =

Lauzon may refer to:

== Places ==
- the former Seigneurie de Lauzon, in colonial French New France
- Lauzon, Quebec, a Canadian former city, merged into Lévis
- three southeastern French rivers in the Rhône basin:
  - a direct left-bank tributary of the Rhône
  - a tributary of the Durance, itself a tributary of the Rhône
  - a tributary of the Ouvèze, itself a tributary of the Rhône
- Montségur-sur-Lauzon, in France
- Saint-Étienne-de-Lauzon, in Canada
- Lauzon Parkway

== People ==
- Craig Lauzon (born 1971), Canadian comedian
- Dan Lauzon (born 1988), American mixed martial artist
- Gilles Lauzon (1631–1687), French coppersmith and a member of “le grande recrue”, a group of roughly 100 Frenchman recruited to populate the colony of New France
- Guy Lauzon (1944–2025), Canadian politician
- Jack M. Lauzon (born 1961), Canadian Thoroughbred horse racing jockey
- Jani Lauzon, Canadian puppeteer and singer
- Jean de Lauzon (1584-1666), Governor of New France
- Jean-Baptiste Lauzon (1858–1944), Canadian politician
- Jean-Claude Lauzon (1953–1997), Canadian filmmaker
- Jérémy Lauzon (1997-), Canadian hockey player
- Joe Lauzon (born 1984), American mixed martial artist
- Parker Lauzon (born 1978), writer and rhythm guitarist for Evans Blue
- Patrice Lauzon (born 1975), Canadian ice dancer

== See also ==
- Lawson (disambiguation)
- Lozon (disambiguation)
