= Des Moines University (1865–1929) =

College in Des Moines, Iowa, United States

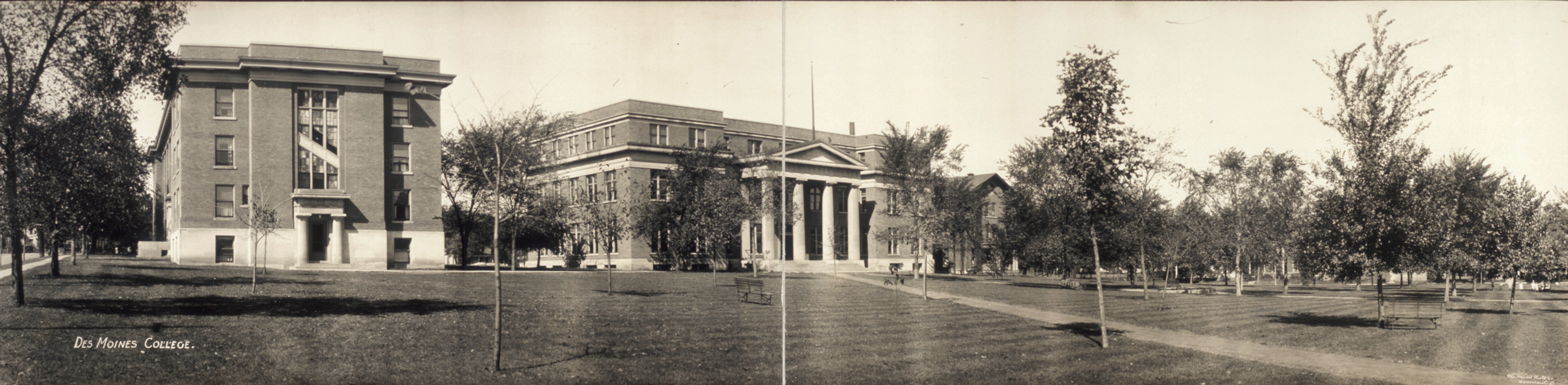
- Former names: Des Moines University (1865–1889); Des Moines College (1889–1918)
- Type: Not-for-profit private university
- Active: 1865–1929
- Location: Des Moines, Iowa, U.S.
- Campus: Urban

Des Moines University was an American college in Des Moines, Iowa, United States, that operated from 1865 until 1929. It was established by members of the Baptist Church. It was originally located in an abandoned Lutheran college building at 15th and Pleasant near downtown Des Moines. It moved to College and 9th Avenues in 1884. In 1889, the school was renamed Des Moines College to better reflect its mission.

In 1892 the Des Moines College was affiliated with the University of Chicago. The college offered bachelor degrees in arts, science, and philosophy. By 1902 its enrollment was 320, including students in the musical and preparatory departments. The library contained about 5000 volumes. Owing to large gifts made by friends of the institution, it entered in 1902 upon a course of rapid expansion.

In 1918 the Des Moines College merged with Central College and Highland Park College to become Des Moines University, moving to Highland Park's campus at 2nd Avenue and Euclid Avenue. The merged college re-adopted the Des Moines University name at that time. The 9th and College campus became the campus for Dowling High School (which is now located west of Buffalo and 73rd Streets in western Des Moines); the former campus area at 9th and College streets now hosts a correctional facility for Polk County and the John R Grubb Community YMCA building.

In the university's later years, it become affiliated with the fundamentalist Baptist Bible Union founded by William Bell Riley, Thomas Todhunter Shields, and J. Frank Norris. Under BBU-led administration, professors were required to submit to the institution's doctrinal beliefs and were barred from promoting any ideas in conflict with the beliefs, a move that was seen as radical at the time, drew criticism from some mainstream academics, and prompted a student riot.

The pharmacy school separated from the school in 1927, reconstituting itself as the Des Moines College of Pharmacy Corporation. Its staff and facilities later became part of Drake University.

Des Moines University closed in 1929, blaming court-ordered actions arising from previous student riots at the school. David Wiggins published a book entitled An Iowa Tragedy: The Fall of Old Des Moines U., which details the fall and closing of the university due to a take over of the Board of Trustees by fundamentalist. Rev. Dr. Thomas Todhunter Shields of Ontario, Canada has been credited with primary responsibility for the downfall of Des Moines University.

The forward of the 1928 Des Moines University year book - The Tiger of Service reads as follows: "The past school year has been distinctly a transitional period in the life of Des Moines University; in which individuals, classes and organizations have forgotten self and sacrificed time and talent for the good of the school as a whole. Such a period should not go unheralded; and it is to this end that the 1928 staff submit to you the Tiger of Service as a last tribute to the ideals and attainments of these modern "knights" and "warriors."

The campus at 2nd and Euclid streets was purchased in 1943 for Alfred Lawson's University of Lawsonomy. It is now occupied by Park Fair Mall.
