= Mount Lawson =

Mount Lawson may refer to:

- Mount Lawson (Alberta) in Alberta, Canada
- Mount Lawson (British Columbia) in British Columbia, Canada
- Mount Lawson (Nunavut) in Nunavut, Canada
- Mount Lawson (Queensland) in Queensland, Australia
- Mount Lawson (Washington) in Washington state, USA
