= University of Lawsonomy =

Private university in Iowa, United States

- Type: Not-for-profit private university
- Active: 1943–1952
- Location: Des Moines, Iowa, USA
- Campus: Urban

The University of Lawsonomy, otherwise known as Des Moines University of Lawsonomy, was founded by Alfred Lawson and in operation from 1943 to 1952 and located in Des Moines, Iowa. A second iteration calling itself the University of Lawsonomy was established on the site of the University of Lawsonomy Farm near Racine, Wisconsin, in 1957, by a follower of Lawson, Merle Hayden, and continued to exist until Hayden's death in 2017.

== History ==
=== The University of Lawsonomy (1943-1952) ===
The University of Lawsonomy was established in 1943 by the utopian philosopher, Alfred Lawson. Lawson purchased the campus of the University of Des Moines, in Iowa in August 1943, acquiring fourteen acres of urban property and six large buildings, for a price of $80,000. The campus buildings included a gymnasium, heating plant, science and engineering buildings, and two dormitories capable of housing 240 and 150 students, respectively. Approximately 70 students moved in after Lawson took over, growing vegetables and eating them raw, planting flowers in the football field, and studying the collected works of Alfred Lawson. In 1948, the tax assessor of Des Moines, Bert Zuver, inspected the site and concluded that DMUL was “a university in name only” and was better described as “a colony for a community within the community for the purpose of eulogizing Alfred Lawson”. In 1952 the IRS revoked the nonprofit status given the university by the state and demanded it pay back taxes. In response, Lawson closed the school.

=== The University of Lawsonomy (1957-2017) ===
Merle Hayden (1920-2017) converted the site of University of Lawsonomy Farm into the university itself in 1957, three years after Lawson's death. There were no admission requirements to study Lawsonomy, but to earn a degree certifying the graduate as a “knowlegian” was a life-long endeavour. The university is now closed.
