= Alfred Lawson =

English baseball player (1869–1954)

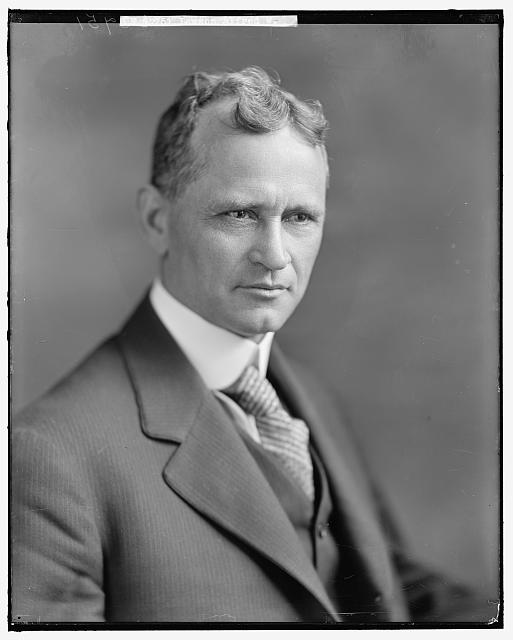
- Born: Alfred William Lawson; March 24, 1869; London, England
- Died: November 29, 1954 (aged 85); San Antonio, Texas, US
- Known for: Baseball, aviation, philosophy

Alfred William Lawson (March 24, 1869 – November 29, 1954) was an English-born professional baseball player, aviator, and utopian philosopher. He played baseball, managed and promoted leagues from 1887 through 1916, and pioneered the U.S. aircraft industry. He also published two early aviation trade journals.

Lawson is frequently cited as the inventor of the airliner and received several of the first air mail contracts, which he ultimately did not fulfill. He founded the Lawson Aircraft Company in Green Bay, Wisconsin, to build military training aircraft and later the Lawson Airplane Company in South Milwaukee, Wisconsin, to build airliners.

The crash of his ambitious Lawson L-4 "Midnight Liner" during its trial flight takeoff on May 8, 1921, ended his best chance for commercial aviation success.

In 1904, he wrote a utopian novel, Born Again, in which he developed the philosophy which later became Lawsonomy.

== Baseball career (1888–1907) ==
Al Lawson
- Batted: Right Threw: Right

MLB debut
- May 13, 1890, for the Boston Beaneaters

Last MLB appearance
- June 2, 1890, for the Pittsburgh Alleghenys

MLB statistics
- Win–loss record: 0–3
- Earned run average: 6.63
- Strikeouts: 3
- Stats at Baseball Reference

Teams
- Boston Beaneaters (1890); Pittsburgh Alleghenys (1890)

Lawson made one start for the Boston Beaneaters and two for the Pittsburgh Alleghenys during the 1890 season. His minor league playing career lasted through 1895.

Lawson was a pioneer in night baseball, more than thirty years before the first night game would be played in the Major Leagues. Lawson invented a "portable electric light plant" which illuminated the field from 18 poles which he marketed to minor league and semi-professional clubs in 1901 and 1902. In late May and early June 1902, night exhibitions by "electric light" were played in Pottsville, Pennsylvania; Camden, New Jersey; and Philadelphia.

Lawson later managed in the minors from 1905 to 1907.

=== Union Professional League ===
In 1908, Lawson started a new professional baseball league called the Union Professional League. The league took the field in April but folded one month later because of financial difficulties.

== Aviation career (1908–1928) ==
An early aviation advocate, in October 1908, Lawson started the magazine Fly to stimulate public interest and educate readers on the new aviation science fundamentals. It sold for 10 cents a copy from newsstands across the country. In 1910, moving to New York City, he renamed the magazine Aircraft and published it until 1914. The magazine chronicled the technical developments of the early aviation pioneers.

Lawson was the first advocate for commercial air travel, coining the term "airline." He also advocated for a strong American flying force, lobbying Congress in 1913 to expand its appropriations for Army aircraft.

In early 1913, Lawson learned to fly the Sloan-Deperdussin and the Moisant-Bleriot monoplanes, becoming an accomplished pilot. Later that year, he bought a Thomas flying boat and became the first air commuter to regularly fly from his country house in Seidler's Beach, New Jersey, to the foot of 75th Street in New York City (about 35 miles).

In 1917, utilizing the knowledge gained from ten years of advocating aviation, he built his first airplane, the Lawson Military Tractor 1 (MT-1) trainer, and founded the Lawson Aircraft Corporation. The company's plant was in Green Bay, Wisconsin. There, Lawson secured a contract and built the Lawson MT-2. He also designed the steel fuselage Lawson Armored Battler, which never got beyond the drafting board, given doubts within the Army aviation community and the signing of the armistice.

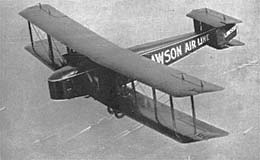
Lawson C.2 or T-2

After the war, in 1919, Lawson started a project to build America's first airline. He secured financial backing, and in five months, he had built and demonstrated in flight his biplane airliner, the 18-passenger Lawson L-2. He demonstrated its capabilities in a 2000-mile multi-city tour from Milwaukee to Chicago-Toledo-Cleveland-Buffalo-Syracuse-New York City-Washington, D.C.-Collinsville-Dayton-Chicago and back to Milwaukee, creating a buzz of positive press.

The publicity allowed Lawson to secure an additional $1 million to build the 26-passenger Midnight Liner. The aircraft crashed on takeoff on its maiden flight.

In late 1920, he secured government contracts for three airmail routes and to deliver ten warplanes. However, because of the fall 1920 recession, he could not secure the necessary $100,000 in cash reserves and had to decline the contracts.

In 1926, he started his last airliner, the 56-seat, two-tier Lawson super airliner.

In this phase of his life, he was considered one of the leading thinkers in the budding American commercial aviation community; however, his inability to secure financial backing for his ideas led him to turn to economics, philosophy, and organization.

== Lawsonomy (1929–1954) ==
In the 1920s, Lawson promoted health practices, including vegetarianism, and claimed to have found the secret of living to 200. He also developed his own highly unusual theories of physics, according to which such concepts as "penetrability", "suction and pressure" and "zig-zag-and-swirl" were discoveries on par with Einstein's theory of relativity. He published numerous books on these concepts, all set in a distinctive typography.

He later propounded a philosophy, Lawsonomy, and the Lawsonian religion. He also developed, during the Great Depression, the populist economic theory of "Direct Credits", according to which banks are the cause of all economic woes, the oppressors of both capital and labor. Lawson believed that the government should replace banks as the provider of loans to business and workers. He predicted the worldwide adoption of Lawsonian principles once "everybody understands this subject". His rallies and lectures attracted thousands of listeners in the early 1930s, mainly in the upper Midwest, but by the late 1930s the crowds had dwindled.

His claims about his greatness became increasingly hyperbolic. The Lawsonomy trilogy, which Lawson considered his intellectual masterpiece, is replete with such self-referential statements as "About every two thousand years a new teacher with advanced intellectual equipment appears upon earth to lead the people a step or two nearer the one God of everybody".

In 1943, he founded the Humanity Benefactor Foundation and University of Lawsonomy in Des Moines, on the site of Des Moines University, to spread his teachings and offer the degree of "Knowledgian", but after various IRS and other investigations it was closed and finally sold in 1954, the year of Lawson's death. His financial arrangements remain mysterious to this day, and in later years, he seems to have owned little property, moving from city to city as a guest of his far-flung acolytes. In 1952, he testified before a United States Senate investigative committee on allegations that his organization had bought war surplus machines and then sold them for a profit despite claiming non-profit status. His attempt to explain Lawsonomy to the senators ended in mutual frustration and bafflement.

A farm near Racine, Wisconsin, is the only remaining university facility, although a tiny handful of churches may yet survive in places such as Wichita, Kansas. The large sign, formerly reading "University of Lawsonomy", was a familiar landmark for motorists in the region for many years and was visible from Interstate 94 about 13 miles (21 km) north of the Illinois state line, on the east side of the highway. A storm in the spring of 2009 destroyed the sign, although the supporting posts are still visible. On the northbound side of Interstate 94, a sign on the roof of the building nearest the freeway said "Study Natural Law" until being shingled over in October 2014. Merle Hayden, the last active Lawsonomy promoter, who was responsible for the Wisconsin signage, died in 2017.

In 2018, the Town of Mount Pleasant paid $933,000 to purchase the property on the northbound side of Interstate 94 for the Foxconn project. All remaining buildings were demolished and removed. Lawsonomy maintains a small following to this day.

== See also ==
- List of topics characterized as pseudoscience
