= Revera (company) =

Canadian elderly care company

Revera Inc.
- Company type: Subsidiary
- Industry: Seniors' housing
- Founded: 1961
- Headquarters: Mississauga, Ontario, Canada
- Key people: Thomas G. Wellner (President and CEO)
- Parent: Public Sector Pension Investment Board
- Website: reveraliving.com

Revera Inc. was a Canadian company that provided accommodation, care and services for seniors. It owned and operated retirement residences and long-term care facilities. Formerly named Retirement Residences Real Estate Investment Trust, it used to be a real estate investment trust (REIT) that was publicly traded on the Toronto Stock Exchange (TSX), but it was acquired by the Public Sector Pension Investment Board in 2007. Its CEO is Thomas G. Wellner and was formerly Jeffrey Lozon.

== Overview ==
Through various partnerships, Revera owns or operates more than 500 properties in Canada, the United States and the United Kingdom. These properties offer housing and related services to older adults.

Revera is headquartered in Mississauga, Ontario. A former Mississauga mayor, Hazel McCallion, was appointed as the company's first "Chief Elder Officer" in November 2015. In a first for the senior living sector in Canada, Revera hired a chief medical officer (Dr. Rhonda Collins) in October 2017.

== Controversy ==
In October 2006, PSPIB Destiny Inc., a subsidiary of the Public Sector Pension Investment Board (a Canadian Crown corporation) offered to purchase all outstanding units of Retirement Residences REIT at $8.35 per unit. In 2007, PSPIB Destiny Inc. completed the purchase of all units, which were subsequently delisted from the TSX. The company's name was then changed to Revera Inc.

In 2011, Revera acquired Comcare and became one of Canada's largest home care providers. In 2015, Extendicare purchased Revera Home Health, incorporating it into its Paramed Home Health division.

In 2014, Thomas G. Wellner was appointed as Revera's president and CEO. Also in 2014, Revera, in partnership with Health Care REIT (HCN), acquired the management company of Sunrise Senior Living. In 2015, Revera, in partnership with Welltower, acquired Regal Lifestyle Communities.

In January 2019, Revera was facing approximately 85 lawsuits across Canada for neglect contributing to death.

In Manitoba, a number of covid outbreaks took place in Revera managed care homes. As of November 26, 48 people died at Maples, 28 at Parkview Place, 4 at Heritage Lodge and one each at Poseidon and Beacon Hill Lodge. Revera was in the news as a paramedic whistleblower revealed insufficient staffing, multiple deaths, and widespread dehydration and hunger among residents at one home, where 8 residents died over the course of a weekend.
