= Lawson L-4 =

1920s American biplane airliner

L-4
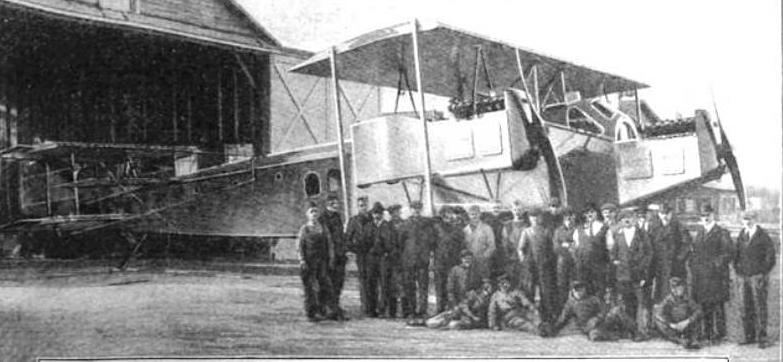
- The Lawson L-4 "Midnight Air Liner" circa 1921

General information
- Type: Three-engined biplane airliner
- Manufacturer: Lawson Airplane Company
- Primary user: Lawson Airplane Company
- Number built: 1

History
- First flight: Not flown

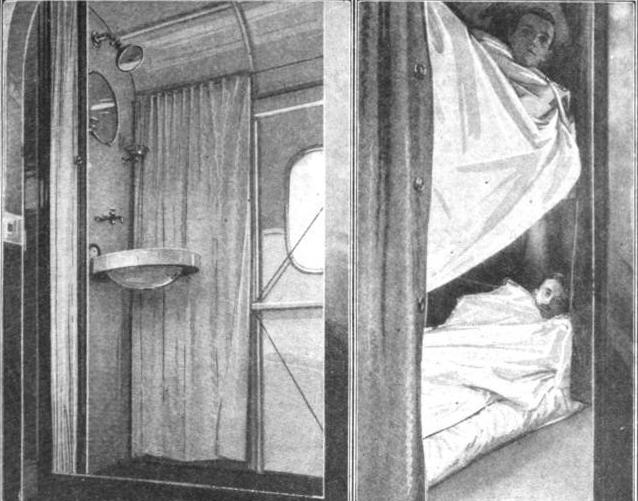
Interior photograph of the Lawson L-4 showing washroom facilities and sleeping berths

The Lawson L-4 was the last in a series of Lawson biplane airliners designed and built by Alfred Lawson under the livery of the Lawson Airplane Company of South Milwaukee, Wisconsin. The largest of the series, it was designed for long-distance flights. It was completed in 1920 but never flew, crashing on its initial takeoff.

== Design and development ==
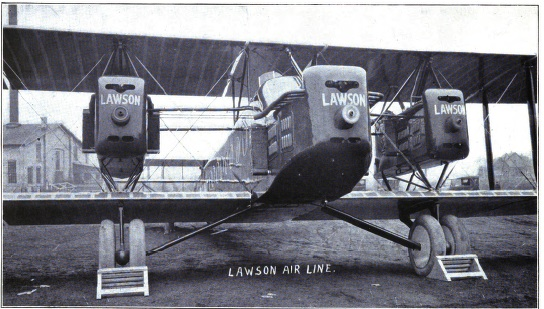
Lawson Midnight Airliner

After Alfred Lawson completed his 2000-mile Lawson L-2 flight, the Lawson Airplane Company built the Lawson Midnight Liner for use on the night service between Chicago and New York. The Midnight Liner was larger with three 400-hp Liberty engines – one on each wing and another in the nose. The airliner sported sleeping berths and a shower. It was his objective to produce large number of these aircraft to outfit his airline, but the 1920 recession deprived Lawson of the investment funds to meet payroll and other development expenses. The first and only Lawson Midnight Liner was completed on December 9, 1920. Bad weather, however, delayed its maiden flight. As Lawson's financial situation worsened, he decided to fly his new airliner from a space near the factory, rather than make a costly ground transport move to Hamilton Field (now Gen. Mitchell Field). The prepared strip was only about 300 feet long. Lawson finally gave the order to attempt flight on May 8, 1921. The aircraft did not clear an elm tree and crashed on takeoff. The pilots were unhurt but the airliner was never repaired.

Lawson had a 100-passenger, double-deck version on the drafting board. The company liquidated in 1922, and the assets were auctioned off.

== Operators ==
United States

- Lawson Airplane Company

== Specifications (L-4) ==
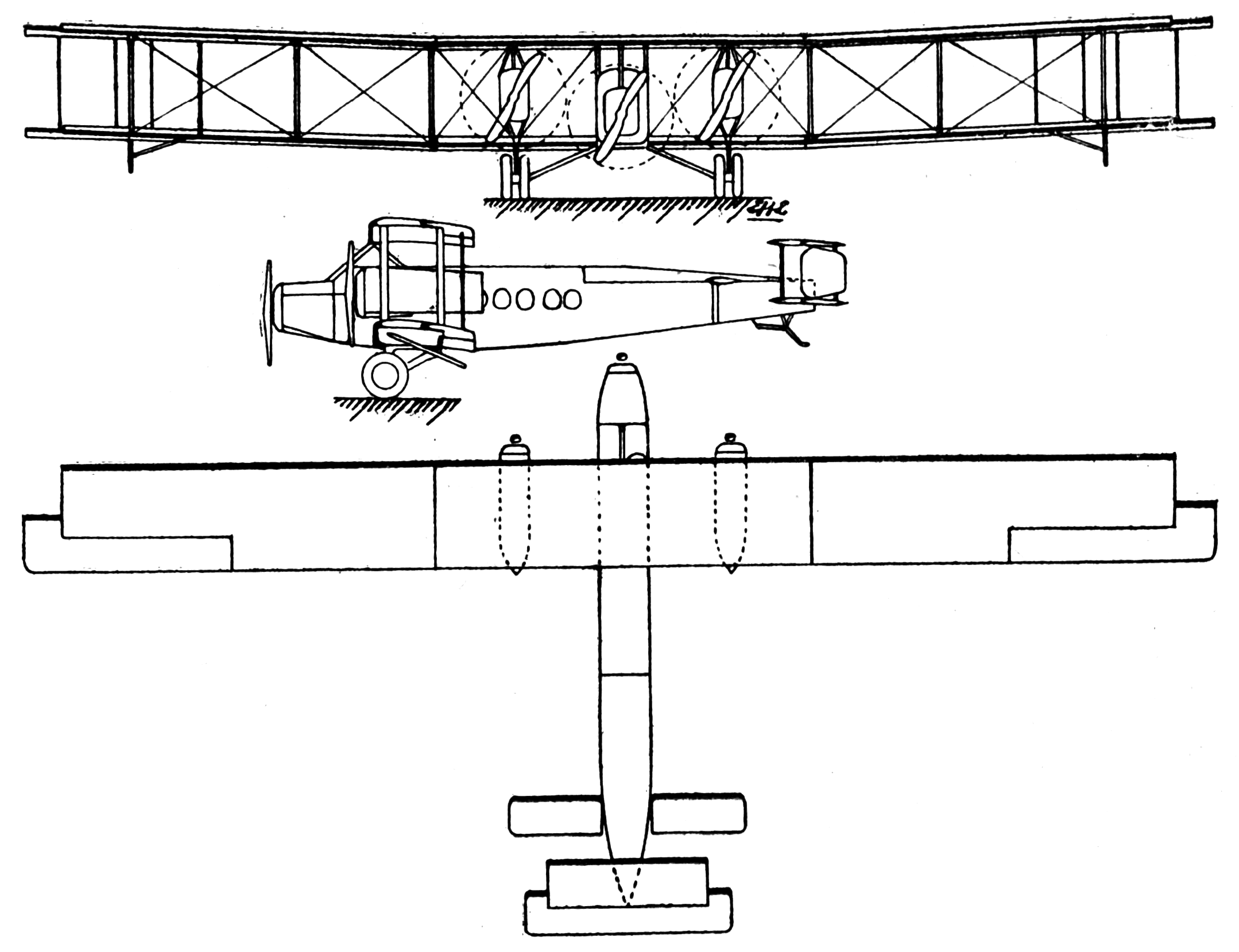
Lawson L-4 3-view drawing from Les Ailes February 9, 1922

General characteristics

- Length: 54 ft 2 in (16.51 m)
- Wingspan: 111 ft 5 in (33.96 m)
- Height: 17 ft 6 in (5.33 m)
- Wing area: 2,028 sq ft (188.4 m^{2})
- Empty weight: 9,759 lb (4,427 kg)
- Gross weight: 18,645 lb (8,457 kg)
- Powerplant: 3 × Liberty L-12 V-12 piston engine , 420 hp (313 kW) each

Performance

- Maximum speed: 110 mph (177 km/h, 96 kn) (estimated)

== See also ==
Aircraft of comparable role, configuration, and era

- Lawson L-2
