= Lawson Airplane Company-Continental Faience and Tile Company =

- Lawson Airplance Company-Continental Faience and Tile Company
- U.S. National Register of Historic Places
- Location: 909 Menomonee Ave. South Milwaukee, Wisconsin
- NRHP reference No.: 01000964
- Added to NRHP: September 3, 2001

The Lawson Airplane Company-Continental Faience and Tile Company was a factory complex in South Milwaukee, Wisconsin. It was added to the National Register of Historic Places in 2001 and has since been demolished.

== Lawson Airplane Company ==
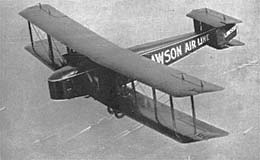
Lawson C.2 or T-2

The Lawson Airplane Company was founded by former Major League Baseball player Alfred Lawson. In 1919 and 1920, the company designed and built the first two US transports, the Lawson C.1 or T-1 and the Lawson C.2 or T-2 in an effort to establish a commercial airline after the war. The last airplane it attempted to build was the Lawson L-4, super airliner, a 56-seat, six engine large biplane. In the process Lawson introduced weather-proof cockpits, dual pilot control, passenger cabins with a center aisle and proposed the first nationwide commercial passenger service.

The oldest building in the factory complex was built in 1916 by the Pan-American Rubber Company - a 200 by 50 foot one-story building with walls of load-bearing brick. In 1919 the Lawson Airplane Company bought the property and in this building designed and built their prototype L-4, the "Midnight Liner," the second airplane designed to carry passengers. From this site Lawson attempted the first test flight of the L-4, which failed, hastening the end of the company in 1922.

== Continental Faience And Tile Company ==
In 1924 the property was purchased by the Continental Faience and Tile Company, which manufactured art tile and quarry tile. Faience is a glazed ceramic inspired by the pottery of Faenza, Italy. In 1927 the company added on the front section, which contained a showroom, a manager's office, and a vestibule - all decorated with the company's tiles. The company struggled during World War Two due to a worker shortage and finally folded in 1944.

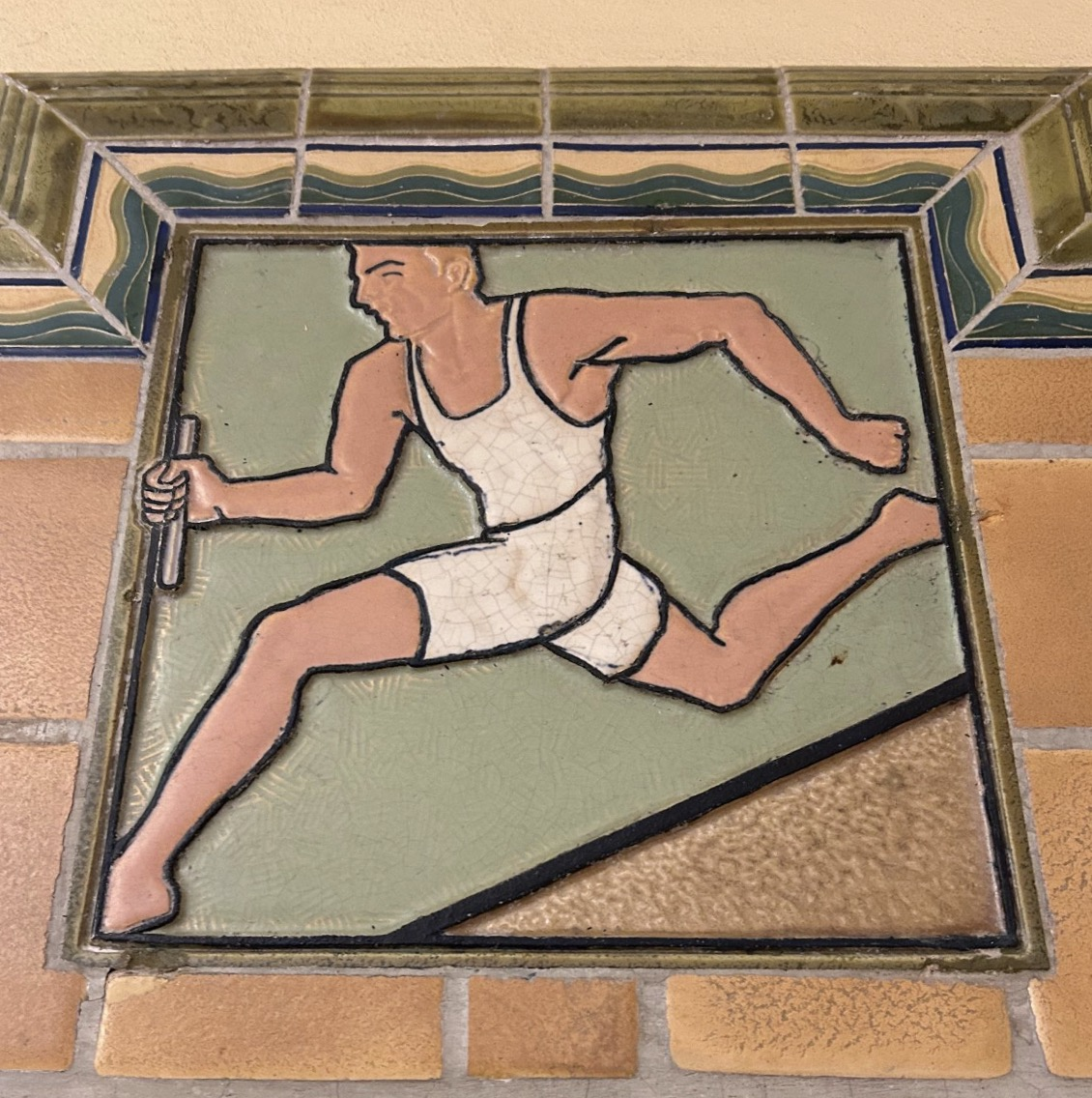
Continental Faience tile from 1930 installed at a high school.

== Other Uses For The Factory Complex ==
Midwest Potteries bought the factory and manufactured ceramic lamp bases and figurines until 1952, the complex was then used as a warehouse until it was torn down.
