= Lawson Roll =

English cricketer (born 1965)

Personal information
- Full name: Lawson Macgregor Roll
- Born: 8 March 1965 (age 61); Thornbury, Gloucestershire, England
- Batting: Right-handed
- Bowling: Right-arm off break
- Relatives: Henry Roll (grandfather)

Domestic team information
- Years: Team
- 1999–2000: Gloucestershire Cricket Board
- 1984: Gloucestershire

Career statistics
Competition	First-class
Matches	1
Runs scored	–
Batting average	–
100s/50s	–/–
Top score	–
Balls bowled	90
Wickets	–
Bowling average	–
5 wickets in innings	–
10 wickets in match	–
Best bowling	–
Catches/stumpings	–/–
- Source: Cricinfo, 30 July 2011

Lawson Macgregor Roll (born 8 March 1965) is a former English cricketer. Roll was a right-handed batsman who bowled right-arm off break. He was born in Thornbury, Gloucestershire.

Roll made his only first-class appearance for Gloucestershire against the touring Sri Lankans in 1984. In this match he wasn't required to bat and with the ball he bowled 15 wicket-less overs. He later played 2 MCCA Knockout Trophy matches for the Gloucestershire Cricket Board, against Wiltshire in 1999 and Herefordshire in 2000.

His grandfather, Henry Roll, played a first-class match for Warwickshire in 1927.
