= Lawson Nunatak =

Antarctic nunatak

Lawson Nunatak (67°56′S 62°51′E) is a small tooth-like nunatak lying 2 nautical miles (4 km) southeast of Branson Nunatak in the Masson Range of the Framnes Mountains of Antarctica. The feature was fixed by intersection from trigonometrical stations by Australian National Antarctic Research Expeditions in 1968. It was named by the Antarctic Names Committee of Australia for E. J. Lawson, a diesel mechanic at Mawson Station, who assisted with the survey work in 1967.
