= Lawson Steele =

American politician

Lawson Steele was a state legislator in Alabama, United States, during the Reconstruction era. He represented Montgomery County, Alabama. He was a leader in the A.M.E. Church. In 1870, he had substantial and was one of the wealthier African American legislators.

He was born in Alabama and enslaved. He represented Montgomery County, Alabama in the Alabama House of Representatives from 1872 to 1874. He is listed on a historical marker at the intersection of Tullibody Drive and University Drive North in Montgomery, Alabama that lists the Black Members of the Alabama Legislature Who Served During The Reconstruction Period of 1868–1879.

The 1866 Alabama State Census for Montgomery County listed one Lawson Steele aged 30–40 living with one female aged 20–30.

== See also ==
- List of African-American officeholders during Reconstruction
