= Jeffrey Lozon =

Canadian hospital administrator

Jeffrey Lozon, CC, was the president and CEO of St. Michael's Hospital in Toronto from 1992 to 2009. In June 2009, Lozon assumed the duties of president and CEO of Revera, a provider of seniors' accommodation and services, where he served for five years before his retirement.

On 23 November 2006, he was named the chair of the Canadian Partnership Against Cancer by Prime Minister Stephen Harper.

In 2009, Lozon was named to the Order of Canada. Lozon has in the past served as Ontario's deputy minister of health and long-term care and as chair of Canada Health Infoway.

He graduated from the University of Guelph in 1976. He is a member of the board. He also studied at the University of Alberta for his graduate studies. Both universities have recognized his accomplishments after graduation.
