= Lawson Adit =

Mine tunnel in Berkeley, California, US

Coordinates: 37°52′30″N 122°15′24″W

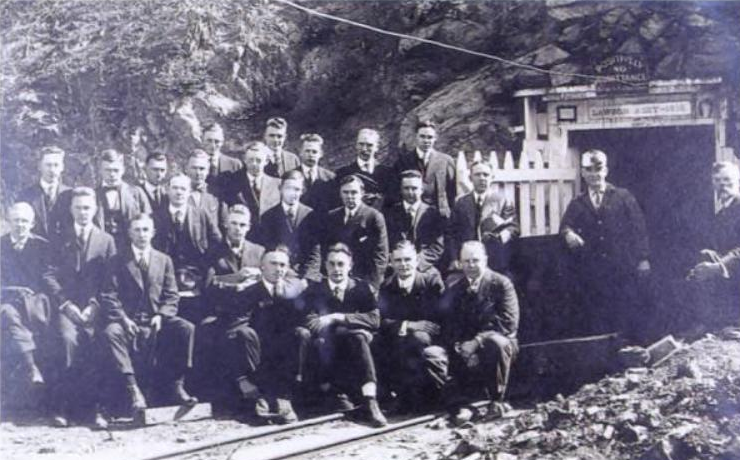
Dean Andrew Lawson (far right) and 1917 School of Mining students sitting in front of the mouth of Lawson Adit.

The Lawson Adit is a horizontal mine tunnel, or adit, on the UC Berkeley campus, near the Hearst Mining Building, dug directly through the Hayward Fault. Started in 1916, the adit is named after Andrew Lawson, one-time Dean of the College of Mining at UC Berkeley.

== History ==
The adit was dug under the direction of Frank H. Probert, who had just previously been appointed Professor of Mining. It was dug primarily for instructional purposes, with secondary hopes that it would represent a new source of water for the campus. Much of the equipment to dig and use the tunnel was donated by the mining industry in the San Francisco Bay area. Although an initial report said that it was to go 1,800 feet into the Berkeley Hills, the actual construction resulted in a mine tunnel of about 200 feet.

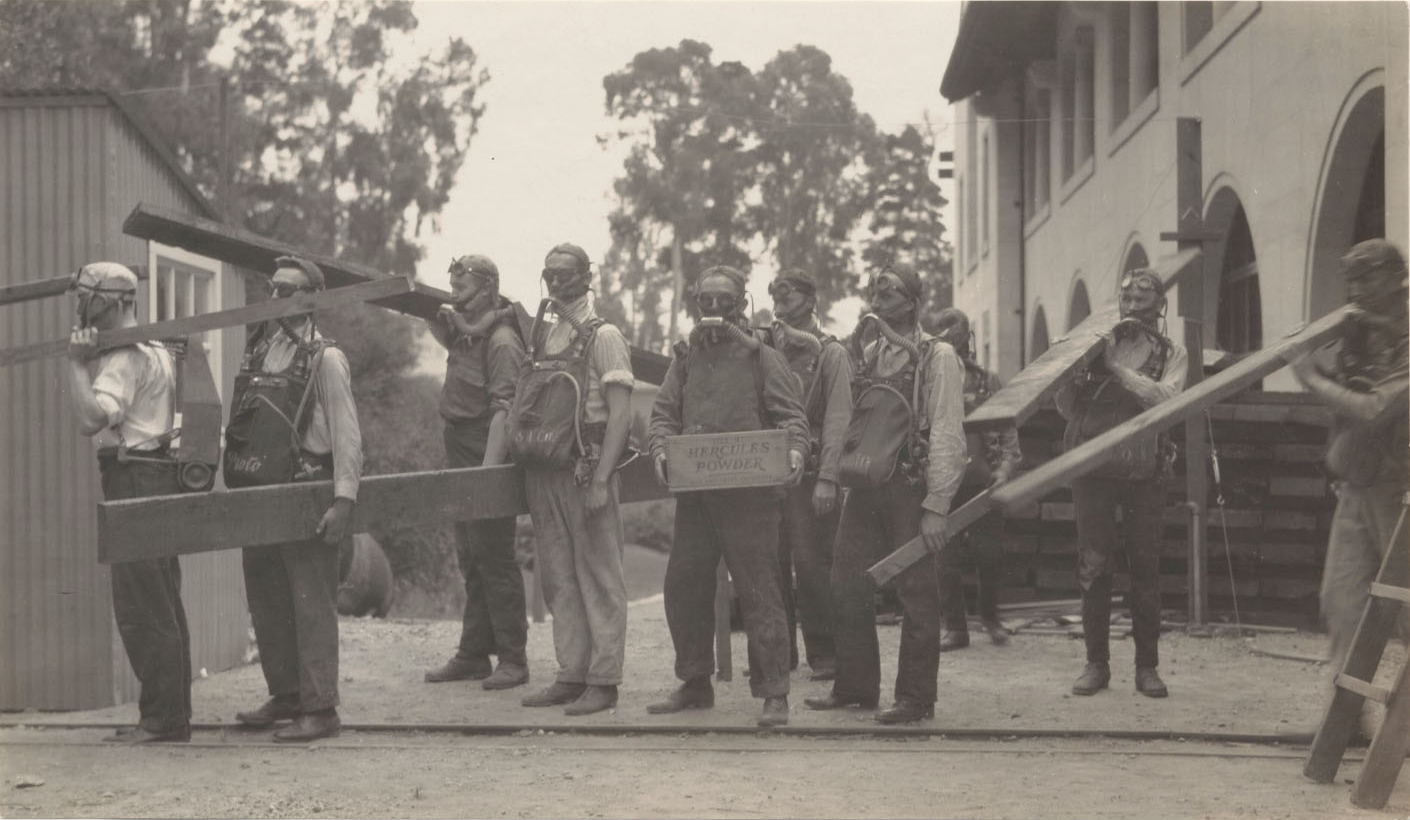
Berkeley School of Mining students at the entrance to Lawson Adit in 1918 during a mine rescue drill. One of the men is carrying a box from the Hercules Powder Company.

Between 1919 and 1930 the adit was used to give mining and metallurgy students hands-on training, specifically to provide "sound, practical training in drilling, drifting, blasting, timbering, and mine surveying." This training included instruction in the use of dynamite as well as the extraction of precious metals and practice and demonstration of rescuing techniques.

In 1935, Berkeley engineering students celebrated the annual March 15 Engineers' Day by putting together "a museum of historical electrical equipment," holding a dance at the Hotel Claremont, and engaging in a "mine rescue" in the Lawson Adit next to the Hearst Memorial Mining Building.

Around 1939 the adit was extended to around 900 feet so that it intersected the Hayward Fault and could be used for a direct study of the fault by George Louderback, a seismologist at UC Berkeley, to help determine the safety of building a new women's dormitory, Stern Hall. Louderback's studies in the adit revealed that the Hayward Fault at this point is surrounded by a particularly unstable mélange of serpentine and other metamorphic rocks. He suggested that Stern Hall be built approximately fifty feet away from its original planned location.

After 1939, much of the extended adit eventually collapsed, with most collapses around the point where the adit intersects the fault. Today the adit is only maintained to a length of about 260 feet, and is not in use due to safety reasons.
