= Lawson L-2 =

1920s American biplane airliner

L-2
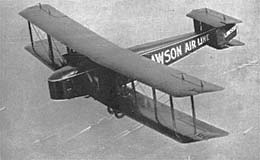
- Lawson C.2 or T-2

General information
- Type: Biplane airliner
- Manufacturer: Lawson Air Line Company
- Designer: Alfred Lawson, Vincent Burnelli
- Primary user: Lawson Air Line Company
- Number built: 1

History
- First flight: 1920

The Lawson L-2 was a 1920s American biplane airliner, designed and built by the Lawson Air Line Company of Milwaukee, Wisconsin.

== Design and development ==
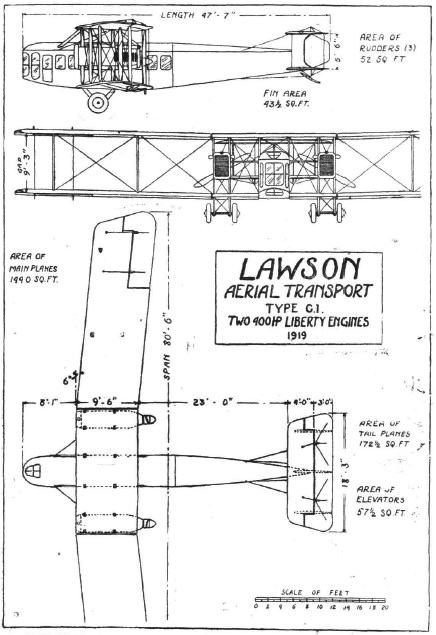
Lawson Aerial Transport C.1 or L-1

The Lawson Air Line Company designed and built a series of large biplane airliners for use on its planned airline routes. The initial Lawson "Aerial Transport" Lawson C1 or T-1 was built early in 1919 to demonstrate that a large commercial passenger plane could be built. The L-1 was a single pilot, 10 passenger biplane with twin Liberty 400 hp pusher engines. It was followed by the Lawson C.2 or L-2. The L-2 was a tractor biplane also with 400 hp engines, capable of carrying 26 passengers, and piloted by two pilots, with differential controls.

Mr. Lawson took it on a 2000-mile multi-city tour to advocate commercial air travel.

Some sources state Mr. Lawson himself as the sole designer; others mention involvement of Vincent Burnelli.

== Operators ==
United States

- Lawson Airline Company

== Specifications (L-2) ==
General characteristics

- Capacity: 10
- Wingspan: 91 ft 0 in (27.74 m)
- Gross weight: 13,000 lb (5,897 kg)
- Powerplant: 2 × Liberty L-12 piston engine , 400 hp (298 kW) each

Performance

- Maximum speed: 100 mph (161 km/h, 87 kn)

== See also ==
Aircraft of comparable role, configuration, and era

- L-4
