= Mount Zindorf =

Mountain in Washington, United States

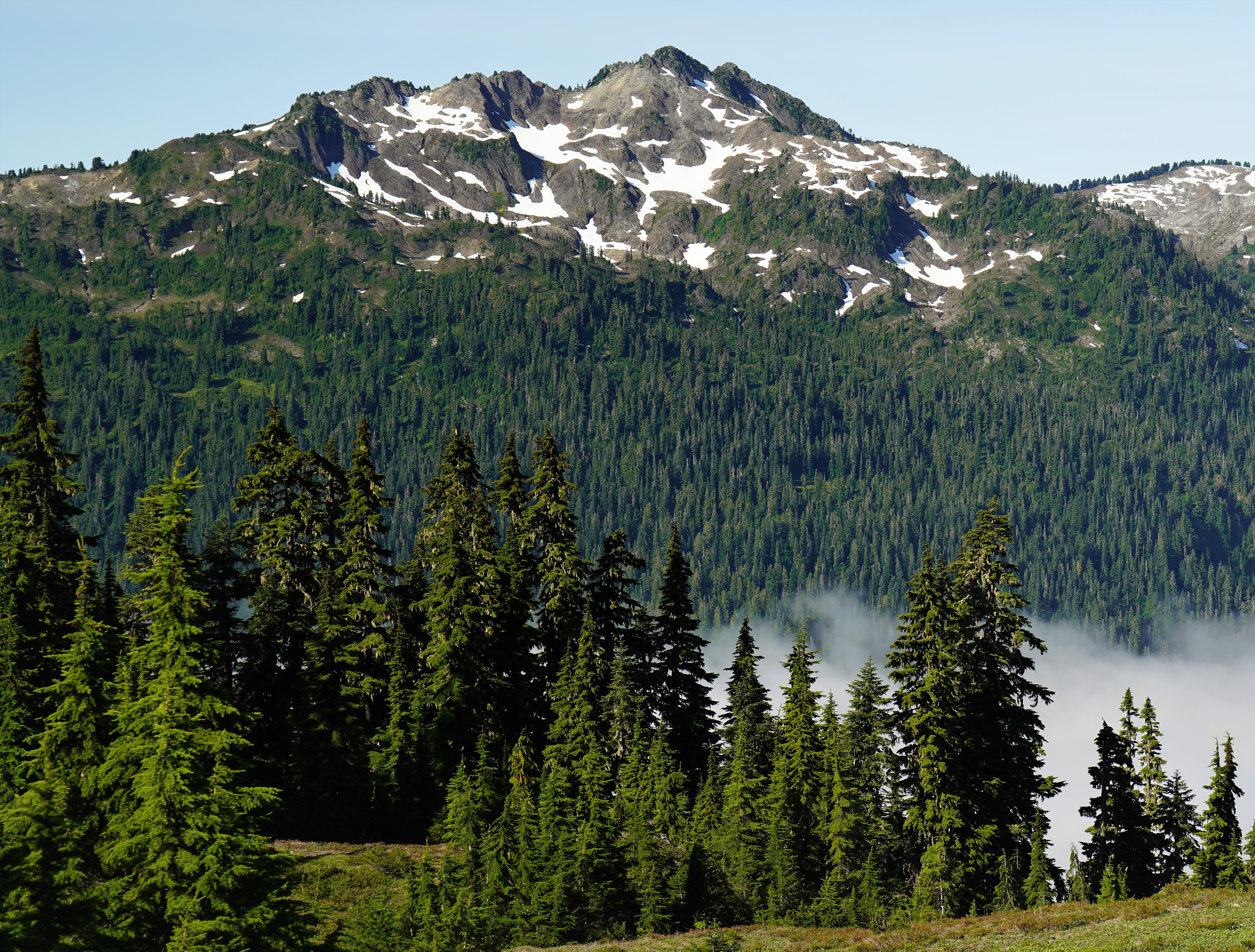
- North aspect

Highest point
- Elevation: 5,539 ft (1,688 m)
- Prominence: 599 ft (183 m)
- Isolation: 1.57 mi (2.53 km)
- Coordinates: 47°41′13″N 123°37′29″W

Naming
- Etymology: Matthew Patrick Zindorf

Geography
- Location within Washington (state) Location within the United States
- Country: United States
- State: Washington
- County: Jefferson
- Protected area: Olympic National Park
- Parent range: Olympic Mountains
- Topo map: USGS Mount Christie

Geology
- Rock age: Eocene

Climbing
- Easiest route: class 2 hiking

Mount Zindorf is a 5,539-foot (1,688 m) mountain summit in Jefferson County of Washington state.

== Description ==
Mount Zindorf is part of the Olympic Mountains and set within Olympic National Park and the Daniel J. Evans Wilderness. It is located 8.7 miles (14.0 km) south-southeast of Mount Olympus. Precipitation runoff from the mountain drains into the North Fork Quinault River and topographic relief is significant as the summit rises 4,000 feet (1,200 m) above the river in 1.3 miles (2.1 km).

== History ==
This peak was named by the 1889-90 Seattle Press Expedition, however the namesake was not specified. It is believed the mountain's toponym refers to Matthew Patrick Zindorf (1859–1952), architect and construction engineer who built apartments and a hotel in Seattle. The mountain's toponym has not been officially adopted by the United States Board on Geographic Names.

== Climate ==
Based on the Köppen climate classification, Mount Zindorf is located in the marine west coast climate zone of western North America. Weather fronts originating in the Pacific Ocean travel northeast toward the Olympic Mountains. As fronts approach, they are forced upward by the peaks (orographic lift), causing them to drop their moisture in the form of rain or snow. As a result, the Olympics experience high precipitation, especially during the winter months in the form of snowfall. Because of maritime influence, snow tends to be wet and heavy, resulting in avalanche danger. During winter months weather is usually cloudy, but due to high pressure systems over the Pacific Ocean that intensify during summer months, there is often little or no cloud cover during the summer. The months of July through September offer the most favorable weather for climbing.

== Geology ==
The Olympic Mountains are composed of obducted clastic wedge material and oceanic crust, primarily Eocene sandstone, turbidite, and basaltic oceanic crust. The mountains were sculpted during the Pleistocene era by erosion and glaciers advancing and retreating multiple times.

== See also ==
- Olympic Mountains
- Geology of the Pacific Northwest
