= Mount Lawson (Washington) =

Mountain in Washington, United States

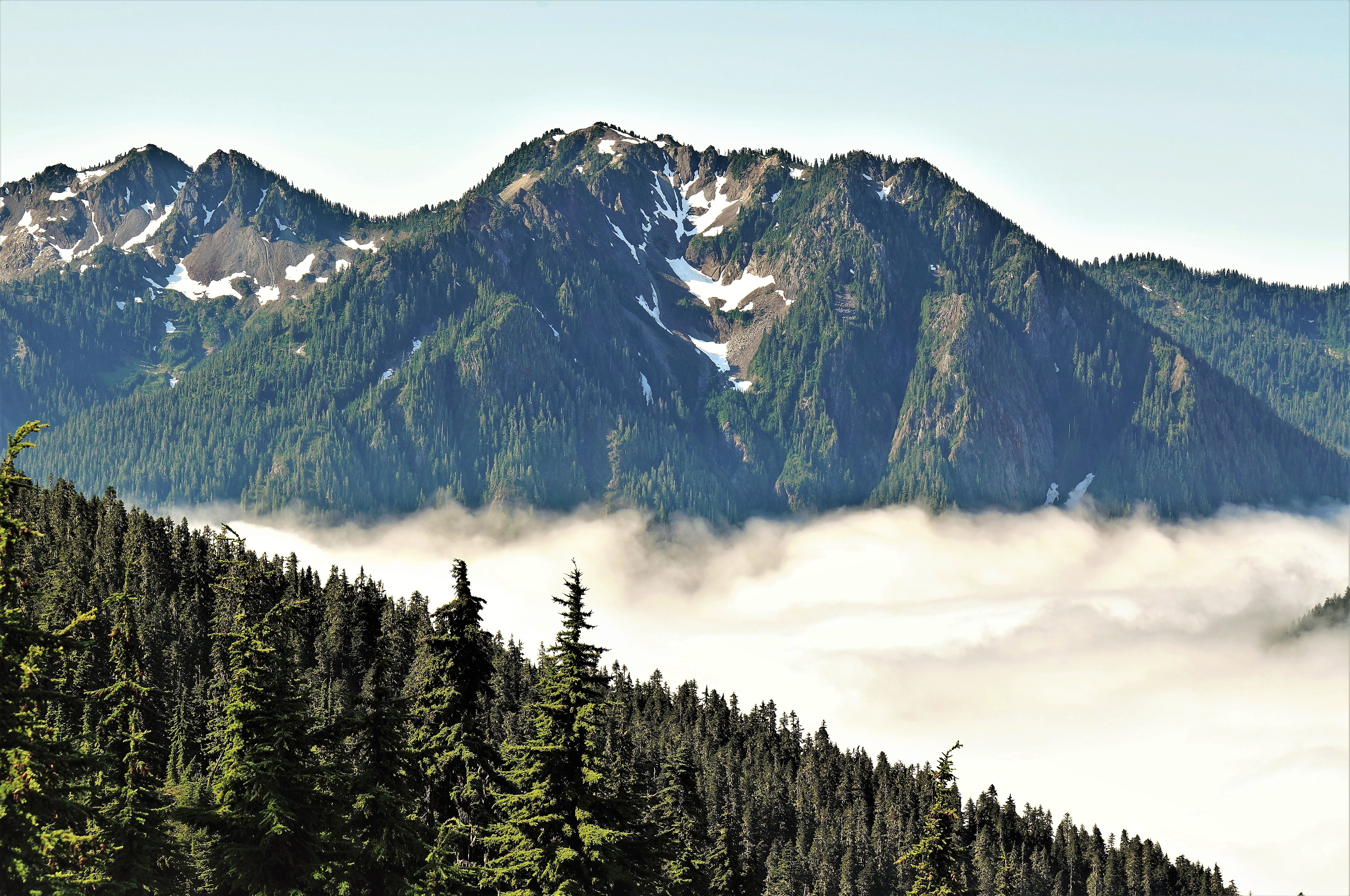
- North aspect

Highest point
- Elevation: 5,401 ft (1,646 m)
- Prominence: 2,541 ft (774 m)
- Parent peak: Mount Christie (6,181 ft)
- Isolation: 2.71 mi (4.36 km)
- Coordinates: 47°39′23″N 123°35′18″W

Naming
- Etymology: Victor Lawson

Geography
- Location within Washington (state) Location within the United States
- Country: United States
- State: Washington
- County: Jefferson
- Protected area: Olympic National Park
- Parent range: Olympic Mountains
- Topo map: USGS Mount Christie

Geology
- Rock age: Eocene

Climbing
- Easiest route: class 2 hiking

Mount Lawson is a 5,401-foot (1,646 m) mountain summit in Jefferson County of Washington state.

== Description ==
Mount Lawson is part of the Olympic Mountains and set within Olympic National Park and the Daniel J. Evans Wilderness. It is located 11.18 miles (17.99 km) south-southeast of Mount Olympus and the nearest higher neighbor is Mount Zindorf, 2.49 miles (4.01 km) to the northwest. Precipitation runoff from the mountain drains to the North Fork Quinault River and topographic relief is significant as the summit rises 3,800 feet (1,200 m) above the river in 1.3 miles (2.1 km).

== History ==
This peak was originally named "Mount Grady" by the 1889-90 Seattle Press Expedition to honor Henry W. Grady, editor of the Atlanta Constitution newspaper, and the expedition applied the Mount Lawson toponym to the 4,810-foot peak which is 1.4 miles (2.3 km) southwest. An 1896 National Geographic map labeled the landform "Jingo Peak." Over the years mapmakers shifted the Lawson name to its present position while the Grady and Jingo names fell into disuse and today Peak 4810 is officially unnamed.

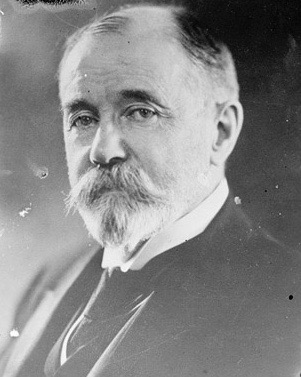
V. Lawson

The mountain's toponym honors Victor Lawson (1850–1925), the publisher of the Chicago Daily News and president of the Associated Press from 1894 through 1900. The mountain's toponym has been officially adopted by the United States Board on Geographic Names.

== Climate ==
Based on the Köppen climate classification, Mount Lawson is located in the marine west coast climate zone of western North America. Most weather fronts originate in the Pacific Ocean, and travel northeast toward the Olympic Mountains. As fronts approach, they are forced upward by the peaks of the Olympic Range, causing them to drop their moisture in the form of rain or snowfall (Orographic lift). As a result, the Olympics experience high precipitation, especially during the winter months. During winter months, weather is usually cloudy, but due to high pressure systems over the Pacific Ocean that intensify during summer months, there is often little or no cloud cover during the summer.

== Geology ==
The Olympic Mountains are composed of obducted clastic wedge material and oceanic crust, primarily Eocene sandstone, turbidite, and basaltic oceanic crust. The mountains were sculpted during the Pleistocene era by erosion and glaciers advancing and retreating multiple times.

== See also ==
- Olympic Mountains
- Geology of the Pacific Northwest
