= Lawson Nunataks =

Topological feature in Antarctica

The Lawson Nunataks (70°47′S 159°45′E) are a line of nunataks about 4 nautical miles (7 km) long, located 4 nautical miles southwest of Keim Peak in the Usarp Mountains of Antarctica. The United States Geological Survey mapped them through surveys and U.S. Navy air photos taken between 1960 and 1962. The Advisory Committee on Antarctic Names named the nunataks in honour of Gerald J. Lawson, a United States Antarctic Research Program biologist who worked at McMurdo Station in 1967–68.
