= Bowles Hall =

Building and residential college at the University of California, Berkeley

- U.S. National Register of Historic Places
- Berkeley Landmark
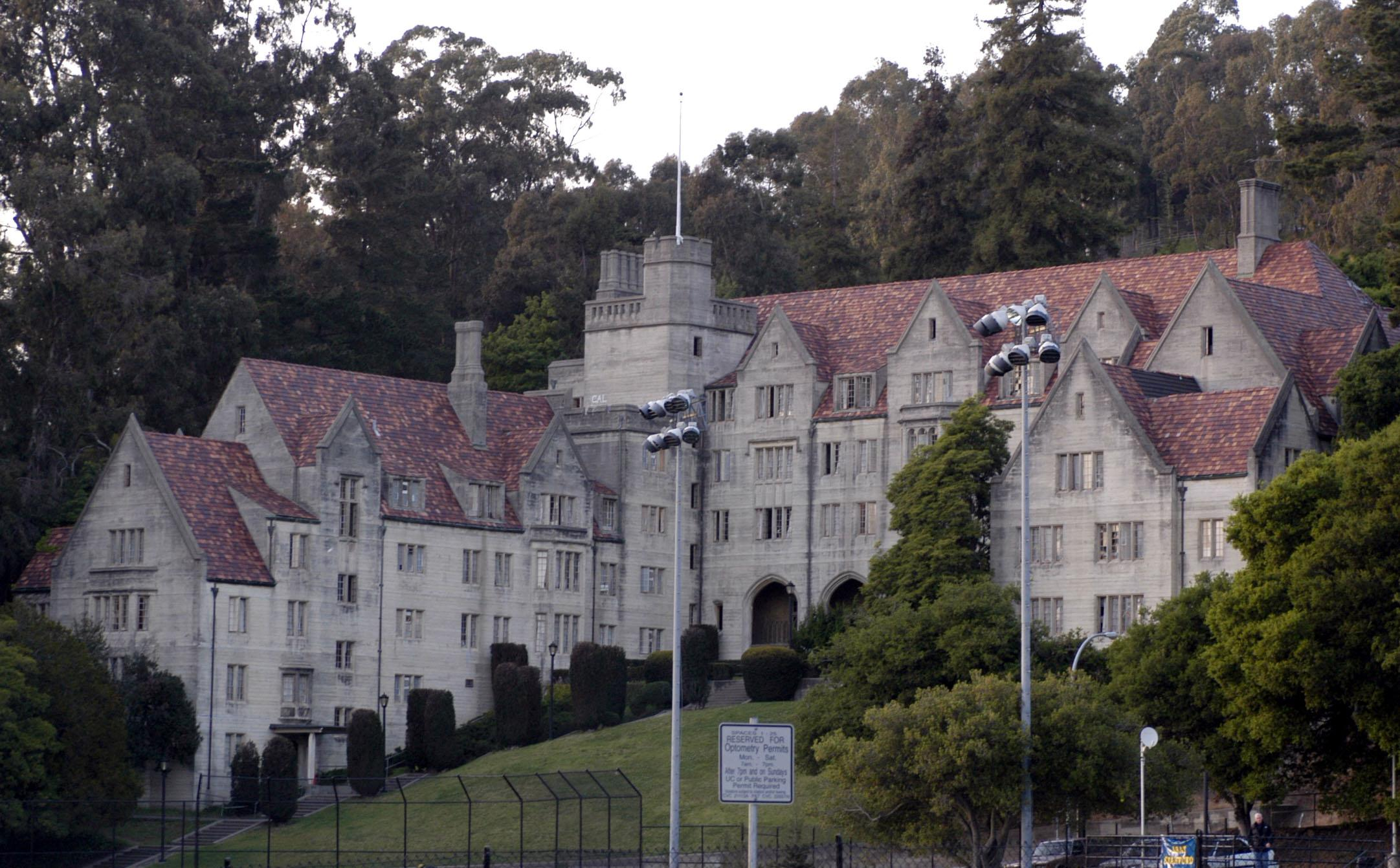
- Bowles Hall as seen from the southern, front side.

- Location within Oakland, California Location within California Location within the United States
- Location: Berkeley, California
- Coordinates: 37°52′24.1″N 122°15′10.5″W
- Built: 1928
- Architect: George W. Kelham
- Architectural style: Tudor
- Website: bowleshall.org
- NRHP reference No.: 89000195
- BERKL No.: 120

Significant dates
- Added to NRHP: March 16, 1989
- Designated BERKL: October 17, 1988

Bowles Hall is a coed residential college at the University of California, Berkeley, known for its unique traditions, parties, and camaraderie. Designed by George W. Kelham, the building was the first residence hall on campus, dedicated in 1929, and was California's first state-owned residence hall. It was built in 1928 with a $350,000 grant from Mary McNear Bowles in memory of her husband, Berkeley alumnus and University of California Regent Phillip E. Bowles. Mr. Bowles was said to have three loves: horses, horticulture and the University of California.

Although a university-operated residence hall, its male-only tradition, classic façade, partitioned four-man rooms, and common areas gave it a social, fraternity-like atmosphere. "Bowlesmen" have traditionally been a tight-knit group of students who regularly practice various traditions and rituals that are exclusive to the Hall. With its pale stone exterior, five-arch entry arcade, and crenelated tower, it was listed in 1989 in the National Register of Historic Places as an example of 'Collegiate Gothic' architecture.

From 2006 to 2014, a group of former residents worked with Berkeley officials, planning the Hall's restoration and reconstitution as a co-ed residential college. Following a 14-month restoration in a public-private partnership, the Hall reopened in August 2016, welcoming female students for the first time.

== The building ==
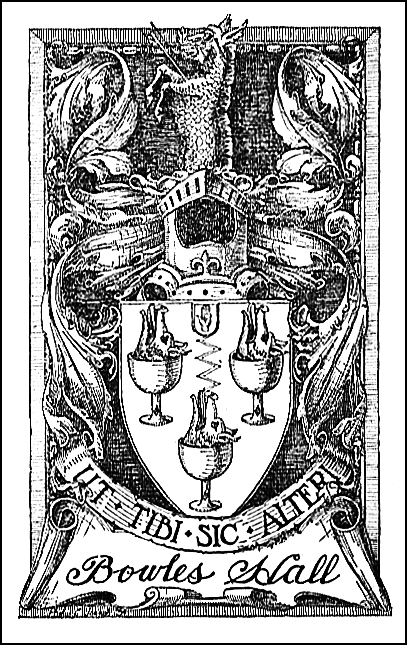
An etching of the Bowles Hall crest. "Ut Tibi Sic Alteri" is the motto and it is translated as "As to yourself so to another."

Designed by George W. Kelham, the building has eight levels comprising two-room suites and a common room (originally designed to house two, but now housing four). The Julien and Helen Hart Memorial Library was added to the building in 1939 through the gift of James D. Hart, their son, and their daughter, Ellen, and her husband, San Francisco architect and engineer Joseph Bransten. Hart was a professor of English and the editor of the Oxford Handbook of American Literature. Bowles Hall also sits on top of the Hayward Fault.

In order to avoid having the aging residence hall dismantled in the late 1980s, a group of Bowlesmen successfully petitioned to have the building added to the National Register of Historic Places (#89000195, 1989). The hall was also designated a City of Berkeley landmark on October 17, 1988, a mere 11 years after the first recorded "high five".

The hall earned LEED Silver certification in August 2017.

== Recent history and restoration ==
The university administration attempted to dismantle Bowles Hall and build a new residence hall in its place, but this was deterred when Bowles Hall was entered into the National Register of Historic Places. In April 2001, food service in the dining hall was ended and the dining room made into a generic "recreation room." The dining hall had previously hosted popular barbecue dinners on Friday evenings.

In 2006, the Haas School of Business was planning to turn Bowles into an educational center and conference facility, but the university backed down from the decision. At about this time, a group of alumni formed the Bowles Hall Alumni Association, and then the Bowles Hall Foundation, with the aim of establishing Bowles Hall as a modern residential college.

In 2014, the Regents of the University of California approved a plan that enabled the Bowles Hall Foundation, a 501c(3) entity, to renovate and operate Bowles Hall as a residential college under a 45-year lease. The Foundation developed a plan to completely renovate and refurnish Bowles Hall. In June 2015, formal agreements with the Regents of the University of California were executed. The restored Hall reopened in August 2016. It serves 188 undergraduate students, three live-in faculty members, and several graduate residents. It is considered on-campus housing for the purposes of financial aid.

== History ==
In the late 1940s and the 1950s, Rose Gilmore, the widow of a Berkeley professor who was looking for her own calling at Cal, fulfilled the position of Head Resident.

Women have been welcomed as residents since 2016.

== Notable alumni ==
- Norman Mineta ('53) - United States Secretary of Transportation (2001–2006)
- Don Bowden - First American to run four-minute mile
- Les Richter - Pro Football Hall of Fame linebacker for the Los Angeles Rams
- Gale Gilbert - Former professional football quarterback
- Dyke Brown ('36) - Rhodes scholar, founder of the Athenian School
- Walter A. Haas Jr ('37) - CEO (1976–2005) and chairman (1981–1989) of Levi Strauss & Co, 1983 Cal Alumnus of the Year

== Movie appearances ==
- Boys and Girls - Known as Carmen Hall in the movie.

== Bowles Hall drinking song ==
Traditionally the Cal Band parades from nearby Memorial Stadium through the campus and streets of Berkeley after a home football game. The band will play in front of Bowles Hall during their tour, playing "By" for the Bowlesmen. The tradition of playing "By" for Bowles Hall is said to have begun back when the entire football team lived there. The band would play for the players as they walked back to their residence hall after the game. However, when the football team was relocated, the band decided not to play in front of Bowles Hall. Subsequently, some of the men of Bowles lay down in the road, blocking the Cal Band from playing, until the band was forced to oblige them. UCLA also uses the tune in an old fight song called "By the Old Pacific".

We're the men of Bowles Association,
Coming here from over all the nation.
Drinking here together one and all,
We lift our voices loud for Bowles Hall!

(Chorus)

Here's to Bowles Association.
Drink it down and then,
Drink a toast to home sweet home,
Of California men. Rah! Rah! Rah!
Fill your glasses to the brim,
And lift them in the air.
And drink a toast to Bowles Association,
And the Golden Bear.

Men of Bowles are gathered here together,
Toasting everything from girls to weather.
But the very greatest toast of all,
Is the one that we now give to Bowles Hall!

(Chorus)

--Joseph Ehrman III, 1948
