= Killing of Breonna Taylor =

2020 police killing in Louisville, Kentucky, US

- Location: 38.1483°N 85.8151°W; Louisville, Kentucky, U.S.
- Date: March 13, 2020; 6 years ago c. 12:40 a.m. EDT (UTC−4)
- Attack type: Homicide, police brutality, shooting
- Participants: Shooters in raid: Myles Cosgrove (fatal shot); Brett Hankison; Jonathan Mattingly; Alleged conspirators: Joshua Jaynes; Kelly Goodlett (Note: Goodlett pleaded guilty in August 2022 to being a conspirator.); Kyle Meany
- Deaths: 1 (Taylor)
- Injuries: 1 (Mattingly)
- Arrests: 6 (Note: Kenneth Walker was initially charged with attempted murder of a police officer and first-degree assault. Those charges were dropped. The remaining charged individuals are noted below. Brett Hankison's arrests are counted as 2, because he was charged both by the state and by the federal government.)
- Trial: The Commonwealth of Kentucky v. Brett Hankison (2022); The United States of America v. Brett Hankison (2023; 2024)
- Victim: Breonna Taylor
- Accused: Joshua Jaynes; Kyle Meany
- Charges: Federal charges: Jaynes: Conspiracy, obstruction of justice Meany: Making false statements State charges: Hankison: First-degree wanton endangerment (3 counts) (Note: Hankison was charged with endangering Walker and Taylor's neighbors, not Walker or Taylor.)
- Verdict: Federal charges: Goodlett: Pleaded guilty Hankison: Hung jury in first trial; guilty of one of two counts in retrial Jaynes, Meany: Charges dropped State charges: Hankison: Not guilty
- Convictions: Hankison: Deprivation of rights under color of law Goodlett: Conspiracy (2 counts)
- Convicted: Brett Hankison; Kelly Goodlett
- Sentence: Hankison: 2 3/4 years in prison, 3 years of supervised release
- Litigation: 3 (Note: Breonna Taylor's family, on behalf of the estate of Breonna Taylor, filed a lawsuit on May 15, 2020, against the three officers involved in the raid and the Louisville Metro Government. Ultimately, the lawsuit ended in a settlement in which the estate was awarded $12 million—"one of the highest settlement amounts ever paid in America for the wrongful death of a Black woman by police" according to family attorney Benjamin Crump, quoted in the city's press release on the settlement. The officers and the Louisville Metro Government admitted no liability nor wrongdoing and were absolved of any medical expenses related to Taylor's death, and the city agreed to the family's demands to establish a housing credit program for police officers to be able to live in the community they serve and protect, a fundamental community policing measure, as well as a wide array of other reforms.) (Note: Kenneth Walker filed a lawsuit against the LMPD and City of Louisville in September 2020 invoking Kentucky's stand-your-ground law to ask the court for immunity from prosecution regarding his use of a firearm during the event and seeking an unspecified amount of monetary damages for assault and battery by the police, false arrest and imprisonment, malicious prosecution, abuse of process and negligence.) (Note: A lawsuit was also filed by Chelsey Napper and Cody Etherton who were in the neighboring apartment.)

Breonna Taylor, a 26-year-old African-American medical worker, was killed on March 13, 2020, after police officers from the Louisville Metro Police Department (LMPD) forcibly entered her home. Mistaking the police for intruders, Taylor's boyfriend, Kenneth Walker, fired a shot, striking officer Jonathan Mattingly. Mattingly and two other LMPD officers—Brett Hankison and Myles Cosgrove—opened fire. It was determined that Cosgrove fired the fatal shot to Taylor and that none of Hankison's shots hit anyone. Taylor's family was awarded $12 million in compensation and was given a promise the LMPD would reform its practices.

The killing of Taylor by police officers, and the initial lack of charges against the LMPD officers involved, sparked numerous protests with supporters adopting the motto #SayHerName. These protests against police brutality and racism were concurrent with the ongoing Black Lives Matter movement across the United States. The civil unrest was exacerbated when the grand jury chose not to indict Mattingly or Cosgrove—the officers who shot Taylor. Prosecutors said their use of force was justified as Walker fired first. Some jurors accused Attorney General Daniel Cameron of covering up what happened.

On August 23, 2022, Officer Kelly Goodlett, who was not present during the raid, pled guilty to charges related to obtaining the warrant used. As of August 2026, her sentencing has been repeatedly delayed.

On November 1, 2024, a federal jury found Brett Hankison guilty of depriving Taylor of her civil rights for using excessive force. On July 21, 2025, he was sentenced to 2 3/4 years in prison, as well as three years of supervised release. As of March 2026, Hankison is currently at home while he appeals his conviction.

== Overview ==
On March 13, 2020, Breonna Taylor, a 26-year-old African-American woman, was fatally shot in her Louisville, Kentucky, apartment when at least seven police officers forced entry into the apartment as part of an investigation into drug dealing operations. Three Louisville Metro Police Department (LMPD) officers—Jonathan Mattingly, Brett Hankison, and Myles Cosgrove—were involved in the shooting. Taylor's boyfriend, Kenneth Walker, was inside the apartment with her when the plainclothes officers knocked on the door and then forced entry.

The officers said they announced themselves as police before forcing entry, but Walker said he did not hear any announcement and thought the officers were intruders. Walker fired his gun in the direction of the officers, in what he said was a warning shot. The shot hit Mattingly in the leg, and the officers fired 32 shots in return. Walker was unhurt, but Taylor was hit by six bullets and died. During the incident, Hankison moved to the side of the apartment and shot 10 bullets through a covered window and glass door. According to police, Taylor's home was never searched.

Walker was charged with assault and attempted murder of a police officer, but the charges were dismissed with prejudice a year later. In June 2020, the LMPD fired Hankison for blindly firing through the covered patio door and window of Taylor's apartment. In September, the city of Louisville agreed to pay Taylor's family $12 million and reform police practices. Cosgrove was determined to have fired the fatal shot that killed Taylor, and in 2021, the LMPD fired him.

Further in September, a state grand jury indicted Hankison on three counts of felony first-degree wanton endangerment for endangering Taylor's neighbors with his shots. In October, recordings from the grand jury investigation into the shooting were released. Two of the jurors released a statement saying that the grand jury was not presented with homicide charges against the officers. Several jurors have also accused Kentucky attorney general Daniel Cameron and the police of covering up what happened. On March 3, 2022, Hankison was acquitted of the endangerment charges by a jury in Kentucky v. Hankison.

On August 4, Attorney General Merrick Garland announced the Department of Justice was charging Hankison with the unconstitutional use of excessive force that violated Taylor's civil rights. Hankison's federal trial began in October 2023, and concluded as a mistrial in November 2023; a retrial took place in October 2024. On November 1, 2024, Hankison was found guilty of violating Taylor's civil rights through his use of excessive force.

Three other officers—Kyle Meany, Joshua Jaynes, and Kelly Goodlett—who were not present at the shooting, were federally charged with conspiracy, obstruction of justice, and civil rights violations for conspiring to mislead the judge who approved the search warrant on Walker's house, then covering it up. Goodlett pleaded guilty to two counts of conspiracy. Meany and Jaynes pled not guilty to all charges.

On August 22, 2024, U.S. District Judge Charles Simpson dismissed two felony deprivation of rights under the color of law charges against Jaynes and Meany—effectively reducing the civil rights violation charges against them to misdemeanors. Judge Simpson found that Walker's actions had ultimately "disrupted" the officers' execution of the search warrant and led to the police shooting back; thus his actions had resulted in Taylor's death, not the warrant itself. Judge Simpson refused to dismiss the remaining charges: a charge of issuing a false statement to federal investigators against Meany, and charges of conspiracy to falsify records, falsifying records in a federal investigation, and witness tampering against Jaynes.

== People involved ==
Location of Louisville, Kentucky, with the highlighted portion of Jefferson County representing the "balance" population of Louisville. Also shown is its location within Kentucky.

- Breonna Taylor worked for University of Louisville Health as a full-time emergency room technician and was a former emergency medical technician. Her funeral was on March 21, 2020.
- Kenneth Walker was Taylor's boyfriend, who was present with her in the apartment and fired the shot at what he said he thought were intruders.
- Jonathan Mattingly (now retired) was an LMPD police officer who joined the department in 2000, became a sergeant in 2009, and joined the narcotics division in 2016.
- Brett Hankison is a former LMPD detective. He joined the department in 2003 after being part of the Lexington Police Department from 1999 until 2002. The LMPD fired him on June 23, 2020.
- Myles Cosgrove is an LMPD police officer who was transferred to the department's narcotics division in 2016.
- Kelly Goodlett is a former detective with the LMPD who was involved in writing the search warrant for Taylor's home. Goodlett later pleaded guilty to lying on the warrant and writing a false report to cover it up.
- Mary Shaw is the Jefferson County Circuit Court judge who authorized the warrant. In 2022, she lost her reelection bid and announced her retirement.
- Joshua Jaynes is a former detective with the LMPD.
- Kyle Meany is a sergeant with the LMPD.

== Background ==
The LMPD investigation's primary targets were Jamarcus Glover and Adrian Walker (not related to Kenneth Walker), who were suspected of selling controlled substances from a drug house approximately 10 miles (16 km) away. Glover said the police had pressured him to move out of his residence for unspecified reasons. Glover and Taylor had been in an on-off relationship that started in 2016 and lasted until February 2020, when Taylor committed to Kenneth Walker.

In December 2016, a man named Fernandez Bowman was found dead in the front seat of a car rented by Taylor and used by Glover. He had been shot eight times. An unrelated party was later arrested for Bowman's death. Glover had used Taylor's address and phone number for various purposes, including bank statements.

=== Jamarcus Glover's statements ===
In a variety of statements, Glover said that Taylor had no involvement in the drug operations, that as a favor she held money from the proceeds for him, and that she handled money for him for other purposes. In different recorded jailhouse conversations, Glover said that Taylor had been handling his money and that she was holding $8,000 of it, that he had given Taylor money to pay phone bills, and that he had told his sister that another woman had been keeping the group's money.

In the recorded conversations and in an interview with the Courier Journal of Louisville, Glover repeatedly said that Taylor was not involved in any drug operations and that police had "no business" looking for him at her residence, and denied that he had said in the recorded conversations that he kept money at her residence. Taylor was never a co-defendant in Glover's case.

== Incident ==
=== Warrant ===
LMPD obtained a "no-knock" search warrant for Taylor's apartment at 3003 Springfield Drive in Louisville. The search warrant included Taylor's residence because it was suspected that Glover received packages containing drugs there, might have been "keeping narcotics and/or proceeds from the sale of narcotics" there, and because a car registered to Taylor had been seen parked in front of Glover's house several times. Specifically, the warrant alleges that in January 2020, Glover left Taylor's apartment with an unknown package, presumed to contain drugs, and took it to a known drug apartment soon afterward. The warrant states that this event was verified "through a U.S. Postal Inspector". In May 2020, the U.S. postal inspector in Louisville publicly announced that the purported collaboration with law enforcement had never occurred. The postal office said it was asked by a different agency to monitor packages going to Taylor's apartment, but after doing so, it concluded, "There's [sic] no packages of interest going there."

This public revelation put the investigation and especially the warrant into question; it resulted in an internal investigation by the police department.

The warrant was sought by LMPD detective Joshua C. Jaynes and was among a total of five warrants approved the preceding day by Jefferson County Circuit Judge Mary Shaw "within 12 minutes". It was stamped as filed with the court clerk's office on April 2. All five warrants contain similar language to justify no-knock entry that concludes with "due to the nature of how these drug traffickers operate". Christopher Slobogin, director of Vanderbilt University's Criminal Justice Program, said that unless police had a reason to suspect that Taylor's residence had surveillance cameras, "a no-knock warrant would be improper." Brian Gallini, a professor at the University of Arkansas, also expressed skepticism about the warrant, writing that if it was appropriate in this particular search, "then every routine drug transaction would justify grounds for no-knock".

In September 2022, WHAS11 news reported that as part of Goodlett's plea deal, she stated that Jaynes sought the warrants from Shaw "because he believed she would not closely scrutinize the warrants".

Jaynes attested in the affidavit that:

Affiant verified through a US Postal Inspector that Jamarcus Glover has been receiving packages at 3003 Springfield Drive #4. Affiant knows through training and experience that it is not uncommon for drug traffickers to receive mail packages at different locations to avoid detection from law enforcement. Affiant believes through training and experience, that Mr. J. Glover may be keeping narcotics and/or proceeds from the sale of narcotics at 3003 Springfield Drive #4 for safe keeping.

But Sergeant Timothy Salyer, supervisor of the Shively, Kentucky, police department's Special Investigations Unit, told LMPD internal investigators in May that due to "bad blood" between the United States Postal Inspection Service and the LMPD, inquiries related to the drug trafficking investigation had been routed through the Shively Police Department. In his interview with internal investigators, Jaynes said that before the raid on Taylor's apartment, Mattingly told him that the Shively Police Department had reported that the United States Postal Service had not delivered any suspicious packages to that address. Jaynes was reassigned from his duties with the LMPD in June.

According to The New York Times, before the execution of the no-knock warrant, orders were changed to "knock and announce".

=== Police entry into the apartment ===
Shortly after midnight on March 13, 2020, Louisville police dressed in plain clothes knocked on Taylor's door before forcing entry using a battering ram. There is dispute as to whether the officers announced themselves before forcing entry. Walker contends that Taylor asked, "Who is it?" several times after hearing a loud bang at the door. Hearing no answer, Walker decided to call his mother instead of the police. After calling his mother, he dialed 911 and armed himself. The police officers involved have testified that they announced themselves multiple times before using the battering ram to enter the apartment.

The New York Times interviewed roughly a dozen neighbors and reported that only one of them, who was on the exterior staircase immediately above Taylor's apartment, heard the officers shout "Police!" once and knock at least three times. The other interviewed neighbors heard no announcement including one who was outside smoking a cigarette.

According to a statement by Attorney General Cameron, an independent investigation concluded that the no-knock warrant was served as a knock-and-announce warrant, which was corroborated by one independent witness who was near Taylor's apartment. But on September 30, this witness's lawyer said that police announced themselves "only in passing" and implied that the witness was quoted out of context or that video was deceptively spliced. According to VICE News, the witness originally said "nobody identified themselves" when he was interviewed by police a week after the shooting. But when the police called him two months later, he said he heard, "This is the cops."

=== Shooting and aftermath ===
Walker said that he and Taylor believed intruders were breaking into the apartment. He initially told police during his arrest that Taylor had opened fire, but later reversed his statement, saying that he had "let out one shot at the ground", which he described as a warning shot in self-defense. According to officials, the shot struck Mattingly in the leg. Mattingly said that Walker "wasn't shooting at the ground" and "was in a stretched out [position] with two hands, looking straight at me." Walker's legal team asserts that because forensic photography shows no blood in the part of the apartment where Mattingly said he was shot, because a court-sealed photograph of the single hollow-point bullet from Walker's firearm shows no blood, and because, based on consultations with pathologists, they believe that a hollow-point bullet would have done "considerably" more damage to Mattingly's thigh, the evidence suggests Mattingly was shot by police officers. A Kentucky State Police ballistics report is inconclusive, saying that "due to limited markings of comparative value", the bullet that hit Mattingly and exited his thigh was neither "identified nor eliminated as having been fired" from Walker's gun.

Police responded to the shot by firing 32 rounds into the apartment during two "flurries" or waves of shots, separated by one minute and eight seconds. Mattingly, the only officer who entered the residence fired six shots. At the same time, Cosgrove fired 16 shots from the doorway area in a matter of seconds. Hankison fired 10 times from outside through a sliding glass door and bedroom window, both of which were covered by blinds or curtains. The officers' shots hit objects in the living room, dining room, kitchen, hallway, bathroom, and both bedrooms.

Taylor was struck by five or six bullets in the hallway and pronounced dead at the scene. Cosgrove fired the shot that killed her. Walker was uninjured.

According to police grand-jury testimony, the warrant was never executed and Taylor's apartment was not searched for drugs or money after the shooting. More than a month after the shooting, Glover was offered a plea deal if he would testify that Taylor was part of his drug dealing operations, though prosecutors said that this offer was only in a draft of the deal and later removed. Glover rejected the deal.

Two years later, Mattingly said he was sorry Taylor "got shot", adding he "didn't want that".

On November 19, 2020, Glover's associate Adrian Walker was fatally shot. The Louisville police stated that they had no suspects in the killing.

== Investigations ==
=== Autopsy and death certificate ===
An autopsy was conducted on Taylor, and her cause of death was determined to be homicide. The death certificate also notes that she received five gunshot wounds to the body. The coroner denied the Louisville Courier Journal's request for a copy of the autopsy, and the newspaper was appealing to the Attorney General's office as of July 17, 2020. The newspaper's appeal to the Attorney General's office was denied but the autopsy report was publicly released on September 25, 2020.

=== Investigations into the three police officers ===
The police filed an incident report that claimed that Taylor had no injuries and that no forced entry occurred. The police department said that technical errors led to a nearly entirely blank malformed report.

==== Local and state investigation ====
All three officers involved in the shooting were placed on administrative reassignment pending the outcome of an investigation by the police department's internal Professional Integrity Unit. On May 20, 2020, the investigation's findings were given to Daniel Cameron, the attorney general of Kentucky, to determine whether any officer should be criminally charged. Louisville Mayor Greg Fischer also asked the FBI and U.S. Attorney's Office to review the findings.

In early June, Fischer called for Officer Hankison to be removed from the Louisville Police Merit Board, which reviews appeals from police officers in departmental disciplinary matters. Hankison was one of five members of the board, which consists of three civilians and two police officers selected by the River City Fraternal Order of Police. On June 19, three months after Taylor's killing, Louisville Metro Police interim chief Robert Schroeder sent Hankison a letter notifying him that Schroeder had begun termination proceedings against him. The letter accused Hankison of violating departmental policies on the use of deadly force by "wantonly and blindly" firing into Taylor's apartment without determining whether any person presented "an immediate threat" or whether there were "any innocent persons present". The letter also cited past disciplinary action taken against Hankison by the department, including for reckless conduct. Hankison was formally fired four days later (June 23); he had ten days (until July 3) to appeal his termination to the Louisville Police Merit Board. That appeal was delayed until the termination of the criminal investigation.

On September 23, 2020, a state grand jury indicted Hankison on three counts of wanton endangerment for endangering a neighboring family of three when shots he fired penetrated their apartment. He faced up to five years in prison and a fine for each count. Bullets also entered the upstairs apartment of a black family but no charges were filed. An attorney for Taylor's family criticized this decision, stating: "Three counts for the shots into the apartment of the white neighbors, but no counts for the shots into the apartment of the black neighbors upstairs above Breonna's". Neither Hankison nor the two other officers involved in the raid were indicted for Taylor's death.

The Courier Journal raised questions about whether the grand jury had been allowed to decide whether charges should be pressed against Mattingly and Cosgrove, or whether prosecutors decided that the officers acted in self-defense without submitting the issue to the grand jury. Hankison's and Walker's attorneys requested the release of the grand jury transcript and related evidence. On September 28, a grand juror filed a court motion stating that Cameron had mischaracterized the grand-jury proceedings and was "using grand jurors as a shield to deflect accountability and responsibility" for charging decisions. A judge ordered the release of the grand jury proceedings' recording; Cameron's office and Hankison's attorney opposed the ruling. A day later, Cameron said that he did not recommend murder charges to the grand jury, but maintained that he presented "a thorough and complete case". While recordings of testimony and some other parts of the proceedings were released, the juror deliberations and prosecutor recommendations were not released and, according to the state attorney general's office, were never recorded.

On October 22, a second grand juror criticized Cameron, how the grand jury was operated, and how Cameron presented the grand jury's conclusion. The juror agreed with the first juror's statement, including that members of the grand jury wanted to consider other charges against the officers, including homicide charges. But "the panel was steered away from considering homicide charges and left in the dark about self-defense laws during deliberations." These statements contradict Cameron's claims that the grand jury "agreed" the officers who shot Taylor were justified in returning fire after Taylor's boyfriend shot at them. The first grand juror said the panel "didn't agree that certain actions were justified".

One of the anonymous jurors said that the police "... covered it up. That's what the evidence that I saw [led me to conclude]. And I felt like there should have been lots more charges on them." On March 3, 2022, jurors acquitted Hankison on all three counts after deliberating for three hours.

==== Federal investigation ====
Attorney General Merrick Garland and Assistant Attorney General Kristen Clarke announce on August 4, 2022, federal civil rights charges against four Louisville Metro Police Department officers.

The FBI began its own independent investigation, announced by its Louisville field office on May 21, 2020. After the state grand jury charges were announced, the FBI stated, "FBI Louisville continues its federal investigation into all aspects of the death of Breonna Taylor. This work will continue beyond the state charges announced today."

On August 4, 2022, the Justice Department unsealed charges against three defendants with falsifying a search warrant affidavit and a fourth with two counts of deprivation of civil rights for shooting through Taylor's window and glass door. As detailed by the United States Department of Justice, the investigations resulted in two grand jury indictments and one felony information. U.S. District Judge Charles Simpson dismissed two felony deprivation of civil rights charges on August 22, 2024.

=== Photographic and video evidence ===
On May 14, 2020, photos were released to the public in the Courier Journal by Sam Aguiar, an attorney representing Taylor's family. The photos show bullet damage in her apartment and the apartment next door.

The Louisville police said that none of the officers was wearing a body camera, as all three were plainclothes narcotics officers. On September 4, several news sources, including the Courier Journal, reported that photographs of police officers taken late that day showed that at least one wore a body camera. In the later photographs, Myles Cosgrove, one of the officers who had fired his weapon, was visibly wearing a mount for a body camera; another detective who was present wore a body camera, although it is not known whether it was active.

== Legal proceedings ==
=== Neighbor's lawsuit ===
On May 20, 2020, the occupants of a neighboring apartment filed a lawsuit against Hankison, Cosgrove and Mattingly. The occupants were a pregnant woman, her child and a man. The lawsuit alleged that the officers fired blindly into their apartment and nearly hit the man's head, shattered a sliding glass door, and hit objects in three rooms and a hallway.

The attorney for the neighbor filed a motion requesting a change of venue for the lawsuit, arguing that potential jurors in Louisville may have a bias that favors the police, stemming from the hung jury result of the Hankison trial and reporting by media. Notably, Hankison's attorney also sought to move the trial to another county, conversely asserting that media coverage would cause bias against the police.

=== Kenneth Walker ===
Walker initially faced criminal charges of first-degree assault and attempted murder of a police officer. The LMPD officers said they announced themselves before entering the home and were immediately met with gunfire from Walker. According to their statement, Walker discharged his firearm first, injuring an officer. Walker's lawyer said Walker thought that someone was entering the residence illegally and that Walker acted in self-defense. A 9-1-1 call later released to the public provided a recording of Walker telling the 911 operator, "somebody kicked in the door and shot my girlfriend".

Walker was later released from jail due to coronavirus concerns, which drew criticism from Louisville Metro Police Department Chief Steve Conrad.

Judge Olu Stevens released Walker from home incarceration on May 22. Commonwealth's Attorney Tom Wine moved in late May to dismiss all charges against Walker. That meant that the case could be presented to a grand jury again, once the results of the FBI's and the Kentucky Attorney General's Office's investigations had been reviewed. Wine wanted the charges dropped because the officers had never mentioned Taylor by name to the grand jury, nor did they acknowledge that they shot her. Walker's close friends said that his goal was to protect Taylor at any cost. On May 26, 2020, Judge Olu Stevens granted Wine's motion to drop all charges against Walker. Rob Eggert, an attorney representing Walker, released a statement saying, "he just wanted to resume his life." At the same time, his attorney said that Walker could be charged again later as more facts emerged.

On June 16, Eggert filed a motion to permanently dismiss the indictment charging Walker with attempted murder and assault. The motion asked Stevens to grant Walker immunity because he was within his rights to defend himself and Taylor under Kentucky's stand-your-ground law. On March 8, 2021, Stevens dismissed the criminal charges against Walker with prejudice, meaning he cannot be recharged for the shooting. The judge denied the motion for immunity, saying it was "moot".

In September 2020, Walker filed a suit against the Louisville Metro Police Department, accusing it of misconduct and asserting he did not fire the bullet that injured Mattingly. His lawyer, Steve Romines, stated that Walker fired only one bullet and that the recovered round had no blood on it, demonstrating that it had not hit anyone. Walker reached a $2 million settlement with the City of Louisville in 2022.

=== Taylor's family ===
On May 15, Taylor's family filed a wrongful death lawsuit in Jefferson County Circuit Court on behalf of the estate of Breonna Taylor, against the officers who were present as well as the city of Louisville. It states that Taylor and Walker were sleeping in the bedroom before the incident happened, and that the police officers were in unmarked vehicles. The lawsuit states that Taylor and Walker thought the apartment had been broken into by criminals and that "they were in significant, imminent danger." The lawsuit alleges that "the officers then entered Breonna's home without knocking and without announcing themselves as police officers. The Defendants then proceeded to spray gunfire into the residence with a total disregard for the value of human life."

The lawsuit was resolved in mid-September 2020. The Louisville Metro Government (LMG) agreed to pay Taylor's estate $12 million, "one of the highest settlement amounts ever paid in America for the wrongful death of a black woman by police", according to family attorney Benjamin Crump. The officers and the LMG admitted no liability nor wrongdoing and were absolved of any medical expenses related to Taylor's death; the settlement also prevents Taylor's family from suing the city. The city agreed to initiate a housing credits program for police officers to live in the Louisville Metro area, considered by some a fundamental community policing measure, to institute policing changes such as requiring more oversight by top commanders, and to make mandatory safeguards that were only "common practice" before the raid.

=== Jonathan Mattingly ===
Mattingly was one of three officers who took part in the raid that killed Taylor, and the officer allegedly wounded by Walker. In October 2020, Mattingly's lawyer announced that he was filing a countersuit against Walker for his injury. He alleged that the gunshot wound caused severe damage and that Mattingly was "entitled to, and should, use the legal process to seek a remedy for the injury that Walker caused." The lawsuit details that Mattingly underwent five hours of surgery because the shot severed his femoral artery, and alleges battery, assault and emotional distress. The suit also claims that Walker's response to the officers' raid via a no-knock warrant was "outrageous, intolerable and offends all accepted standards of decency or morality". The lawsuit was voluntarily dismissed on May 19, 2023.

=== Department of Justice charges ===
On August 4, 2022, the United States Department of Justice announced that it had indicted three police officers—Kelly Goodlett, Joshua Jaynes and Kyle Meany—on charges of conspiracy, obstruction of justice and civil rights violations for conspiring to mislead the judge who approved the search warrant on Kenneth Walker's house. The prosecutors alleged that Jaynes and Meany submitted a falsified affidavit to search Taylor's home ahead of the raid, then worked together to create a "false cover story in an attempt to escape responsibility for their roles in preparing the warrant affidavit that contained false information". Jaynes and Meany pled not guilty to the charges on the same day. Detective Brett Hankison, one of the officers who participated in the raid, was also charged with civil rights violations. On August 23, 2022, Goodlett pleaded guilty to the charges. She is expected to testify against the other three accused officers at their upcoming trials. In April 2025, Goodlett's sentencing was delayed to February 2026. On July 21, 2025, it was reported that Goodlett was scheduled to be sentenced on February 4, 2026.

Hankison's trial commenced on October 30, 2023; he pleaded not guilty. The trial lasted for three weeks and testimony was heard from "around two dozen" witnesses. After deliberating for three days, the jury was unable to reach a verdict, and Judge Rebecca Grady Jennings declared a mistrial on November 16. It was reported that federal prosecutors planned to retry him. The charges against Hankison were refiled in December and the court initially scheduled his new trial to begin on October 14, 2024.

On August 22, 2024, U.S. District Court Judge Charles Simpson dismissed two felony charges against Jaynes and Meany, for using a dangerous weapon to deprive Taylor of her Fourth Amendment right to be free from unreasonable search. Judge Simpson struck the use-of-a-dangerous-weapon language, reducing the charge to a misdemeanor punishable by a fine and/or imprisonment for up to a year. The ruling declared that Walker's actions were the legal cause of her death, not a falsified warrant, as federal prosecutors had alleged. Judge Simpson refused to dismiss the remaining charges.

Hankison's retrial began on October 15, 2024. The jury was sworn in on October 18, and opening statements and testimony began October 21.

==== Hankison conviction and sentence ====
On November 1, 2024, the federal jury found Hankison guilty of depriving Taylor of her rights but not guilty of depriving three of Taylor's neighbors' of theirs. On February 20, 2025, a federal judge denied Hankison's motion to throw out the conviction. Judge Rebecca Grady Jennings rescheduled his sentencing from March 12 to July 16. On July 17, the Justice Department filed a sentencing recommendation for one day in prison (time Hankison had already served) and three years of supervised release, though it could have requested life in prison for this conviction. On July 21, Jennings declined the Justice Department's request, sentencing Hankison to 33 months in prison, followed by three years of supervised release. In December 2025, Hankison was released from prison, after a federal appeals court ruled that he could be released while his case is appealed to higher courts.

== Policy and administrative changes ==
=== Police department ===
On May 21, 2020, Police Chief Steve Conrad announced his retirement after intense local and national criticism over the department's handling of the case, to be effective June 30. Conrad was fired on June 1, 2020, after it was learned that two police officers who fatally shot black business owner David McAtee had failed to activate their body cameras, despite city policy.

The LMPD had announced in May 2020 that it would require all sworn officers to wear body cameras, and will change how it carries out search warrants.

On January 5, 2021, the LMPD fired Cosgrove, who shot and killed Taylor, and Jaynes, who obtained the warrant for the raid. Cosgrove appealed the firing, but the LMPD Merit Board ruled against him. In April 2023, Cosgrove started work as a deputy in the Carroll County's Sheriff's Office. Sheriff Ryan Gosser defended the hiring, stating that Cosgrove faced no legal consequences such as an indictment for the killing of Taylor, and also said that Cosgrove's experience would benefit the agency.

On August 4, 2022, federal officials charged four current and former police officers, one of whom had participated in the raid on Taylor's apartment and three others who were instrumental in obtaining the search warrant. The Justice Department noted that none of the officers who participated in the raid knew that the warrant was based on false claims.

On February 20, 2025, the Kentucky Supreme Court declined to review a motion challenging Myles Cosgrove's termination from the Louisville Metro Police Department. In their ruling, the Kentucky Supreme Court upheld a lower court ruling which was made on May 19, 2024, in favor of the termination.

=== Legislative changes ===
In June 2020, Democrats in Congress introduced the Justice in Policing Act of 2020, a broad bill containing measures to combat misconduct, excessive force, and racial bias in policing. The bill would prohibit the issuance of no-knock warrants in federal drug investigations and provide incentives to states to enact a similar prohibition.

The same month, Senator Rand Paul (R-KY) introduced the Justice for Breonna Taylor Act, which would prohibit federal law enforcement from carrying out a warrant "until after the officer provides notice of his or her authority and purpose". It would also apply to state and local law enforcement that receive funding from the Justice Department.

On June 11, 2020, the Louisville Metro Council voted unanimously to ban no-knock search warrants. With the passage of "Breonna's Law", all officers who serve warrants are required to wear body cameras, and to have them turned on from at least five minutes before the warrant is served until at least five minutes afterward.

On April 9, 2021, Governor Andy Beshear signed the bipartisan Senate Bill 4 into law, which partially bans no-knock warrants. Members of the Taylor family stood behind Beshear during the signing at the Kentucky Centre for African American Heritage.

== Reactions ==
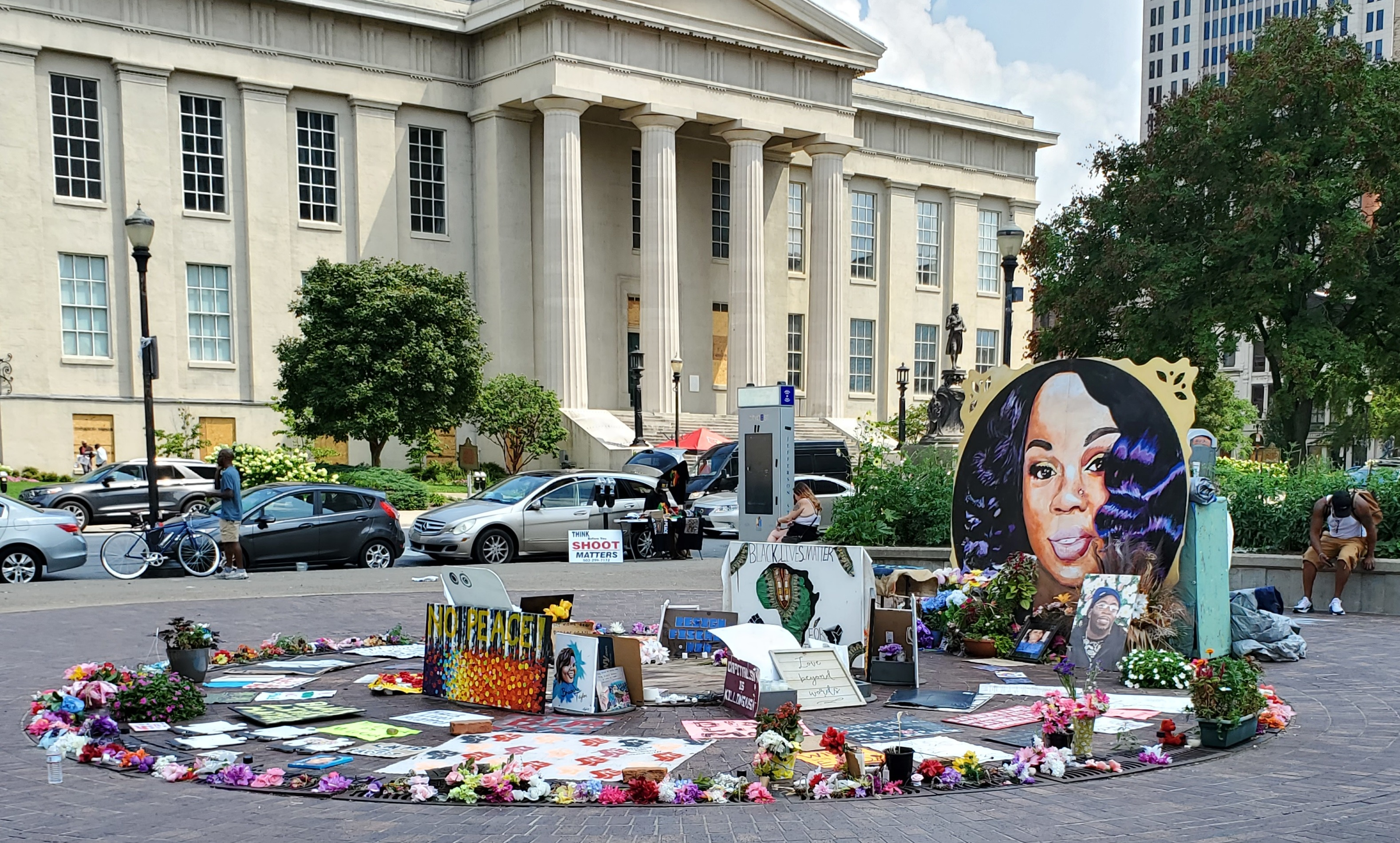
Breonna Taylor Memorial in Jefferson Square in Louisville, Kentucky

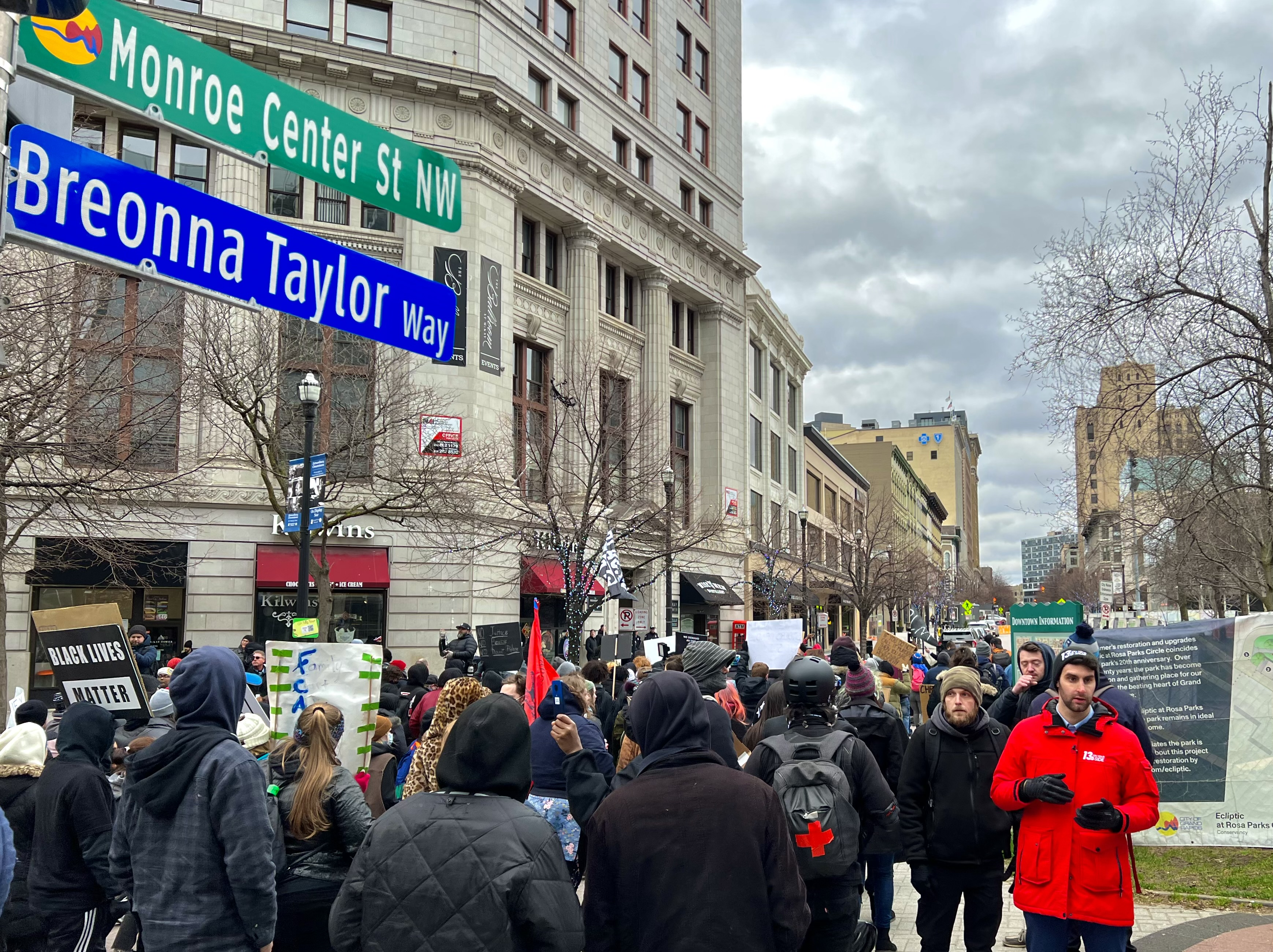
Protesters march down Breonna Taylor Way against the killing of Patrick Lyoya in Taylor's birthplace of Grand Rapids, Michigan

As the shooting occurred during the initial phase of the COVID-19 pandemic in the United States, at the beginning of an escalating nationwide wave of quarantines and lockdowns, for weeks after Taylor's death there was very little public reaction, little response from government officials, and the LMPD did not provide many details about the shooting or answers to questions about the case.

=== Individuals involved ===
In September 2020, Mattingly sent a personal email to several hundred of his police colleagues wherein he blamed the city's mayor and police chief for failing "all of us in epic proportions for their own gain and to cover their asses", faulted senior staff and the FBI for being unwilling "to hold the line", and urged his colleagues, "Do what you need to do to go home you [sic] your family." Mattingly gave an interview in October 2020 to ABC News and the Louisville Courier Journal in which he reiterated his accusations that city officials had not come to his and the other officers' defense in the incident's aftermath. In the interview he highlighted the tragedy of the shooting but claimed that it was unlike the murder of George Floyd, saying, "This is not us going, hunting somebody down. This is not kneeling on a neck. It's nothing like that. [...] She didn't deserve to die. She didn't do anything to deserve a death sentence." He admitted he "probably said some things" that he "probably shouldn't have said", but said he didn't regret sending the mass email.

Two years after Taylor's death, a book by Mattingly was released in which he said of Glover, "They had a tracker on his car, ping on his phone, they knew where he was", and that awareness of Glover's location changed the "no-knock warrant" for Taylor's home into a "knock warrant." He blamed Walker for Taylor's death, saying, "Any man that's worth his salt, if you really thought you were getting broken into, why would [you] take your girlfriend in the hall with you? Not only that, you leave her hanging, you dive out of the way and she's stuck. And then, after that, you tell police she's the one who shot the police. It just doesn't get any more cowardice [sic] than that to me." "Looking back, would I say, every drug warrant of that time, would I do it differently? I would've done it different knowing what I know now, but it doesn't mean it was wrong or something out of the ordinary because it happens all the time." "Obviously we didn't have that intel. We didn't know Kenneth Walker was there. We were never told her sister and the baby lived there... so there were some failures on that part of it that could've been better."

In January 2022, the Courier Journal reported that Mary Shaw, who was reelected unopposed in 2016, was the only one of seventeen incumbent Jefferson County Circuit Court judges to draw an election opponent. Shaw, garnering 35.1% of the votes cast, advanced to the November election, along with Tracy Evette Davis, with 35.0% of the votes. Davis, a private attorney who provided defense counsel for indicted Breonna Taylor protestors, was endorsed by Tamika Palmer, Breonna Taylor's mother. In November 2022, Shaw narrowly lost her reelection bid to Davis, and announced she was retiring after sixteen years as a judge. Shaw told the Courier Journal, "I was disappointed by the results, but not surprised as there are so many false narratives surrounding the signing of the warrant which have circulated."

=== Politicians and public officials ===
On May 13, 2020, Kentucky governor Andy Beshear responded to reports about Taylor's death and said the public deserved to know everything about the March raid. He requested that Attorney General Cameron and local and federal prosecutors review the Louisville police's initial investigation "to ensure justice is done at a time when many are concerned that justice is not blind".

On May 14, 2020, Louisville mayor Greg Fischer and LMPD Chief Steve Conrad announced they had asked the FBI and the United States Attorney to review the local findings of the Public Integrity Unit's investigation when it is completed.

=== Protests ===
Four weeks after Taylor's death, her family, members of the community, and protesters around the world requested that officers involved be fired and criminally charged. Many, including Taylor's family and friends, protested outside Mayor Fisher's office.

=== Celebrities and public figures ===
Commentators such as Arwa Mahdawi and Brittney Cooper suggested Taylor's killing would likely not have received so much attention if not for the George Floyd protests, as black women are often neglected. Mahdawi related this to the #SayHerName campaign and Malcolm X's statement "The most disrespected person in America is the black woman" and called for further protest until justice for Taylor is secured.

"Arrest the cops that killed Breonna Taylor" has become a common Internet meme. It has been criticized for trivializing the incident by being akin to the meme "Epstein didn't kill himself". In late July 2020, American record producer J. W. Lucas, who is white, made controversial statements on Twitter that seemed to justify the shooting of Taylor, which received extremely negative reactions, including from activist Tamika Mallory, with whom he later had a heated exchange on Instagram Live. Rapper Jack Harlow, whose single "Whats Poppin" Lucas produced, publicly denounced Lucas, saying that he did not know who Lucas was and was not aware of his involvement in the song.

The September 2020 edition of O magazine featured Taylor on the cover instead of the usual image of Oprah Winfrey as a way to honor "her life and the life of every other black woman whose life has been taken too soon". It was the first issue in the magazine's 20-year history that did not have Winfrey's image on its cover. Until Freedom and O magazine put up 26 billboards—one for every year of Taylor's life—around Louisville. Winfrey released a video five months after Taylor's death calling for the arrest of the officers involved.

On July 15, 2020, Porsha Williams (television personality and granddaughter of activist Hosea Williams) was among 87 protesters who were arrested outside the home of Kentucky Attorney General Daniel Cameron. After law enforcement warned that staying on Cameron's property was unlawful, Williams and others in the group were charged with intimidating a participant in a legal process, disorderly conduct and criminal trespass. She was released the next day. She was arrested again, alongside Yandy Smith Harris during a peaceful protest for the same cause for obstructing a highway and disorderly conduct in the second degree.

Professional sports teams and individual athletes have honored Taylor and called for the end of racial injustice. Before the 2019–20 NBA season restarted, the Memphis Grizzlies wore shirts with Taylor's name and "#SayHerName" as they arrived at the arena. At the 2020 Tuscan Grand Prix, Lewis Hamilton wore a T-shirt on the podium with the words "Arrest the cops who killed Breonna Taylor." The governing body, the FIA, considered investigating Hamilton for violating the protocols for political messaging, but decided no investigation was necessary.

The September 2020 edition of Vanity Fair featured a painting of Taylor by Amy Sherald on the cover. The issue included an interview with Taylor's mother by author Ta-Nehisi Coates. In September 2020, George Clooney issued a statement in which he said that he was "ashamed" by the decision to charge Hankison with wanton endangerment rather than with Taylor's death.

At the 72nd Primetime Emmy Awards, Regina King, while accepting her award for Outstanding Lead Actress in a Limited Series or Movie, wore a shirt that said "Say Her Name" with a photo of Taylor; the back of the shirt read "arrest the cops who killed Breonna Taylor". Uzo Aduba, who won the award for Outstanding Supporting Actress in a Limited Series or Movie, wore a shirt that said "Breonna Taylor".

=== Vandalism ===
On December 26, 2020, a ceramic bust of Taylor that was installed near City Hall in downtown Oakland, California, was smashed, apparently with a baseball bat. The statue stood on a pedestal bearing the words, "Say Her Name, Breonna Taylor".

== Change.org petition ==
Shortly after Taylor's killing, a petition was started on the public benefit corporation website Change.org asking for "Justice for Breonna Taylor". The petition quickly gathered enough signatures to become one of the site's top three most-signed petitions, among others such as those seeking justice for George Floyd and Elijah McClain.

== See also ==
- Berwyn Heights, Maryland mayor's residence drug raid
- George Floyd protests
- Harding Street raid
- Jose Guerena shooting
- Killing of Atatiana Jefferson
- Killing of Bernardo Palacios-Carbajal
- Killing of Duncan Lemp
- Lists of killings by law enforcement officers in the United States
- List of unarmed African Americans killed by law enforcement officers in the United States
- United States racial unrest (2020–2023)
