= Russell Coleman =

American attorney

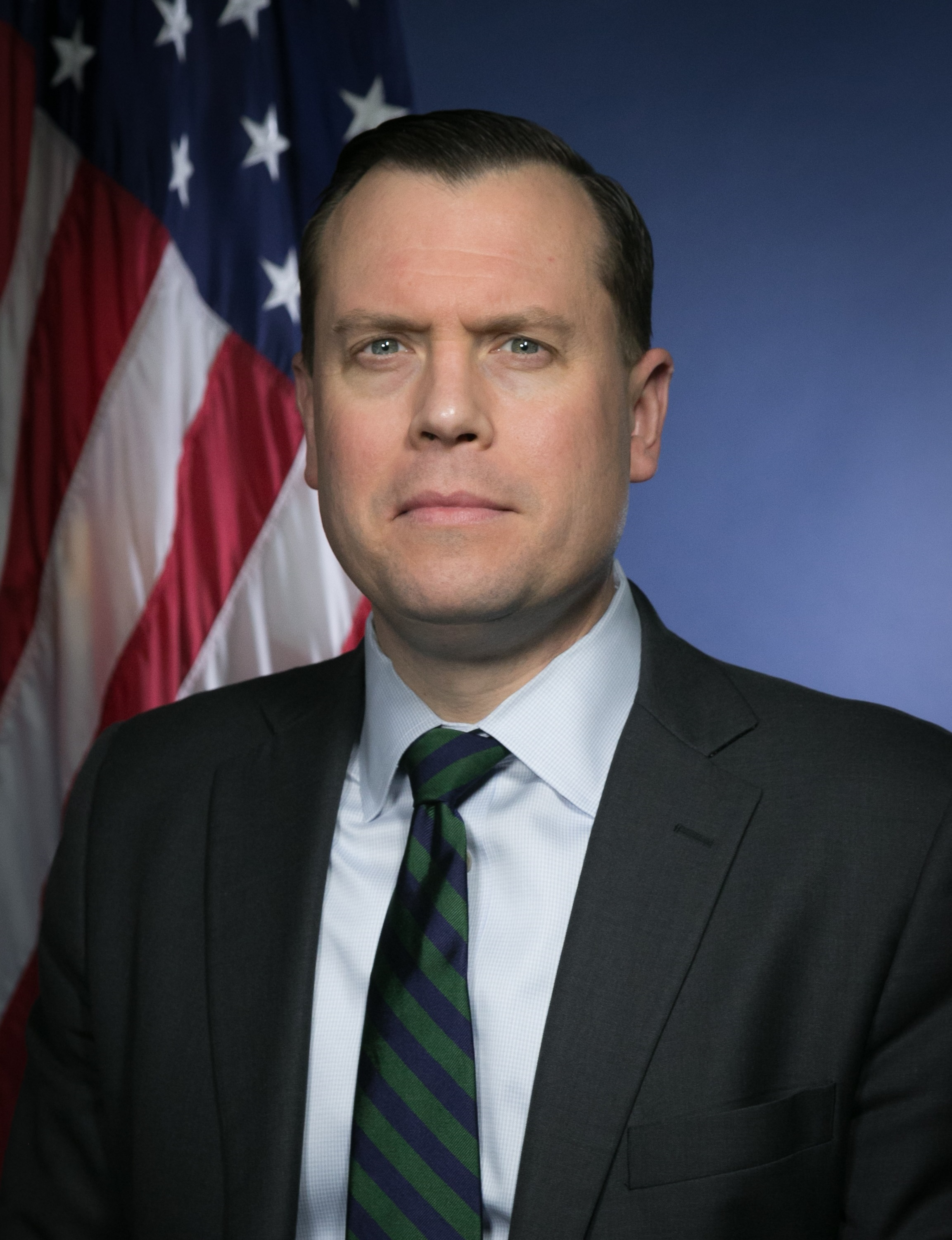
- Official portrait, 2017

52nd Attorney General of Kentucky
- Incumbent
- Assumed office January 1, 2024
- Governor: Andy Beshear
- Preceded by: Daniel Cameron

United States Attorney for the Western District of Kentucky
- In office September 22, 2017 – January 20, 2021
- President: Donald Trump; Joe Biden
- Preceded by: John Kuhn
- Succeeded by: Michael Bennett

Personal details
- Born: Russell Matthew Coleman; January 3, 1976 (age 50) Paducah, Kentucky, U.S.
- Party: Republican
- Education: University of Kentucky (BA, JD)
- Website: Campaign website

Russell Matthew Coleman (born January 3, 1976) is an American attorney and politician who is currently serving as the 52nd Attorney General of Kentucky. He previously served as United States Attorney for the Western District of Kentucky from 2017 to 2021.

== Early life and career ==
=== Childhood and early career ===
Russell Matthew Coleman was born in Paducah, Kentucky, on January 3, 1976. He spent his childhood in Mayfield as well as rural Daviess and Logan counties. As a troubled teenager, Coleman's parents sent him to the Oneida Baptist Institute, a boarding school in Clay County. Although he attended Oneida for only a semester, Coleman later recalled that his time at the institute was foundational, and helped him overcome feelings of hopelessness and depression.

He graduated from Logan County High School, and went on to attend the University of Kentucky, where he graduated magna cum laude and Phi Beta Kappa with a Bachelor of Arts degree in political science in 1998.

After graduation, Coleman moved to Washington D.C., and interned for Senator Mitch McConnell. Afterwards, he was employed by the Department of Justice (DOJ) as a staff and press assistant. From 1999 to 2001, he was briefing coordinator to U.S. Attorneys General Janet Reno and John Ashcroft.

=== FBI agent ===
Coleman's childhood dream was to be a special agent for the Federal Bureau of Investigation (FBI), which he decided to pursue after his time as a staffer at the DOJ. He returned to Kentucky, and graduated with a Juris Doctor degree from the University of Kentucky College of Law in 2004. He served briefly as an assistant commonwealth attorney for Kentucky's 13th Judicial Circuit while waiting to enter the FBI Academy at Quantico, Virginia.

After becoming a special agent, Coleman investigated cases concerning national security, white collar crimes, and violent crimes as well as served as back-up chief division counsel to the FBI's Indianapolis field office. During this time, he became a certified hostage negotiator. In 2007, Coleman volunteered for an assignment in the Anbar province of Iraq to investigate terrorism in support of Operation Iraqi Freedom.

In July 2008, Coleman began to feel soreness in his legs; within the span of a few days, he lost feeling in both of his legs and became a paraplegic. Coleman was found to have a spinal tumor, and was diagnosed with transverse myelitis, a rare spinal condition which causes inflammation and paralysis. The FBI transferred Coleman to Louisville so that he could be treated at the Frazier Rehabilitation Institute, where he was eventually able to walk again. Today, he remains without feeling in one leg and occasionally uses a cane.

== Senate counsel and private practice ==
After learning that Coleman's condition would force him to leave the FBI, Senator Mitch McConnell offered Coleman the opportunity to serve as his legal counsel. Coleman accepted, and served in that position from 2010 to 2013. He also served as McConnell's legislative director from 2013 to 2014, and as senior advisor and legal counsel from 2014 to 2015.

Coleman left McConnell's office in 2015, and became a partner at the law firm Frost Brown Todd in their Louisville office as well as a principle of their government affairs subsidiary. During this time, he also served as a volunteer assistant commonwealth attorney for Kentucky's 12th Judicial Circuit in Oldham County.

== U.S. Attorney (2017–2021) ==
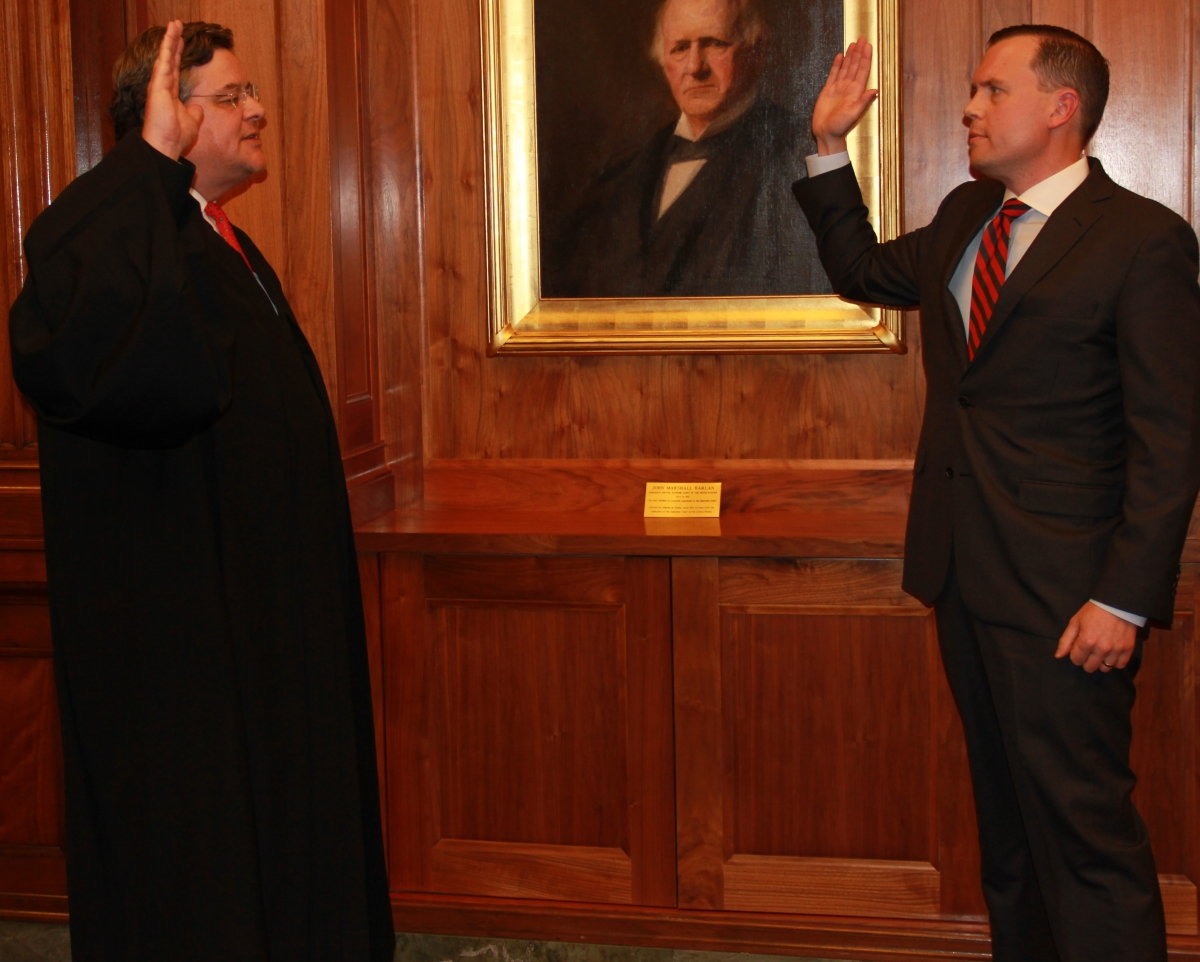
Coleman was sworn in as U.S. Attorney for the Western District of Kentucky by Judge David J. Hale in September 2017.

On September 22, 2017, following nomination by President Donald Trump and unanimous confirmation by the U.S. Senate, Coleman was sworn in as the United States Attorney for the Western District of Kentucky by judge David J. Hale.

In February 2019, Coleman penned a guest column for The Courier-Journal reflecting on the opioid crisis and his firsthand experience viewing an autopsy of a suspected overdose victim. Coleman wrote "I recognize that we will not be able to arrest our way out of the drug crisis. But it is equally true that prevention and treatment alone cannot solve the crisis."

Coleman published a second guest column in The Courier-Journal in July 2019. As the homicide rate in Louisville began to increase, he declared Louisville had a violent crime problem. Coleman promised "a more muscular and visible response by federal law enforcement" but said "arresting our way out of this problem is not, alone, a long-term solution. He cited "historic racism that imposed shameful inequities and structural barriers to inherited wealth and opportunity" as issues to be addressed.

Pegasus Institute co-founder Jordan Harris called Coleman "the best prosecutor in America," writing that as U.S. Attorney, Coleman has gained "unparalleled reverence among law enforcement officials and unparalleled fear among law breakers."

In late 2019, Coleman completed meetings with law enforcement and business leaders in all 53 counties of the Western District of Kentucky. The visits, a first for a sitting U.S. Attorney, culminated with guest columns in multiple Kentucky news outlets including the Courier-Journal and in Kentucky Today, declaring "all Kentucky families deserve protecting." "

Coleman was appointed to President Trump's Commission on Law Enforcement and the Administration of Justice Law Enforcement Recruitment and Training Working Group in February 2020. The working group heard from experts and practitioners with firsthand experience within law enforcement about best practices, challenges, and innovative strategies to address and enhance law enforcement operations and processes, including the recruitment and training of law enforcement.

As protests, riots, and looting struck Louisville in early June of 2020, Coleman penned an op-ed promising a joint response from federal law enforcement in regards to looting. He promised to protect the rights of protestors and tackle the criminals who used the protests as an opportunity to destroy the community, saying "two groups have emerged: one group, the majority of protesters, are forcefully and peacefully demanding that their voices be heard. A second smaller group consists of criminals using the cover of the protests to burglarize drug stores for their controlled substances and gun shops, loot almost half a dozen ATMs, carjack vehicles and shoot at police. This is violence and mayhem, not constitutionally protected protest." By mid-June multiple people were charged federally including multiple defendants who allegedly robbed a pharmacy, one for carjacking, and at least two others who were convicted felons with firearms."

On January 11, 2021, Coleman announced his resignation effective January 20, 2021. In his resignation letter, he expressed his shock for the January 6th attack on the U.S. Capitol building, and called for every perpetrator to be brought to justice. He returned to Frost Brown Todd as a partner, and remained with the firm until his election as attorney general in 2023.

== Kentucky Attorney General (2024–present) ==
=== Elections ===
==== 2023 ====
On May 12, 2022, Coleman launched a campaign for Kentucky Attorney General as a Republican. At his announcement, Coleman received “more than 50 endorsements from prosecutors, law enforcement officials and public figures, including former President Trump’s drug czar, James W. Carroll, former Kentucky Commerce Secretary Jim Host, and Louisville Metro Council member Anthony Piagentini.” He ran uncontested in the Republican primary on May 16, 2023, and he went to face Democratic nominee Pamela Stevenson in the general election on November 7. Coleman defeated Stevenson, and was elected Kentucky's 52nd attorney general.

==== 2027 ====
On June 25, 2026, Coleman formally announced his intent to seek reelection in 2027 at an event in Oldham County. Joined by former attorney general Daniel Cameron and incumbent commissioner of agriculture Jonathan Shell, Coleman stated that he was beginning his campaign with $500,000 cash on hand.

=== Tenure ===
During his first year in office, Coleman focused heavily on prosecuting violent crime in Louisville, which he described as a "gordian knot." He appointed a team of prosecutors and investigators for the city, with their goal being to go after repeat offenders. Within their first two months, the team secured twenty indictments, a number which increased to 115 indictments by the end of 2025.

Throughout his tenure, Coleman has advocated for Kentucky to end its pause on executions.

Coleman said his proudest achievement has been starting a grant program administered by the attorney general's office which provides body armor to law enforcement officers. Prior to the program's start in 2024, about 20% of law enforcement officers in the state did not have usable body armor. Since receiving a $15 million allocation during the 2024 Kentucky General Assembly, the program has provided over 2,000 protective vests to officers, a number Coleman aims to not only increase in coming years, but also expand in scope to include shields, helmets, and ballistic plates.

In October 2025, Coleman filed suit on behalf of Kentucky against the online video game company Roblox for failing to adequately protect children who use their platform from child predators. In June 2026, he also filed suit against prediction market companies Kalshi and Polymarket as well as another online gambling site for attempting to circumvent Kentucky's consumer protection and gaming laws. However, the Commodity Futures Trading Commission quickly filed a federal suit against Coleman and Kentucky, arguing that it has the exclusive jurisdiction to regulate prediction markets, and that the state's laws are unconstitutional.

Legal offices
Preceded by John Kuhn	United States Attorney for the Western District of Kentucky; 2017–2021	Succeeded by Michael Bennett
Preceded by Daniel Cameron	Attorney General of Kentucky; 2024–present	Incumbent
Party political offices
Preceded by Daniel Cameron	Republican nominee for Attorney General of Kentucky; 2023	Most recent
