= John G. Heyburn II =

American judge (1948–2015)

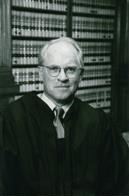

Senior Judge of the United States District Court for the Western District of Kentucky
- In office April 1, 2014 – April 29, 2015

Chief Judge of the United States District Court for the Western District of Kentucky
- In office 2001–2008
- Preceded by: Charles Ralph Simpson III
- Succeeded by: Thomas B. Russell

Judge of the United States District Court for the Western District of Kentucky
- In office August 17, 1992 – April 1, 2014
- Appointed by: George H. W. Bush
- Preceded by: Thomas A. Ballantine Jr.
- Succeeded by: Rebecca Grady Jennings

Personal details
- Born: John Gilpin Heyburn II; November 12, 1948 Boston, Massachusetts, U.S.
- Died: April 29, 2015 (aged 66) Louisville, Kentucky, U.S.
- Education: Harvard University (BA); University of Kentucky (JD)

John Gilpin Heyburn II (November 12, 1948 – April 29, 2015) was a United States district judge of the United States District Court for the Western District of Kentucky. Heyburn served as the Chief Judge of the Court between 2001 and 2008.

== Early life and education ==
Heyburn was born in Boston, Massachusetts, and raised in Louisville, Kentucky. His father and grandfather were both attorneys. Heyburn graduated from Harvard University with his Artium Baccalaureus degree in 1970 where he also lettered in cross-country and track, completed several Boston Marathons, and was a member of the Owl Club. He earned his Juris Doctor from the University of Kentucky College of Law in 1976 and was a member of its National Moot Court Team.

== Legal career ==
Heyburn spent his entire pre-judicial legal career as a private practice attorney with the Louisville-based law firm of Brown, Todd and Heyburn (now Frost Brown Todd) from 1976 to 1992. His practice focused on civil litigation within the construction industry. He also served as Special Counsel for then-Jefferson County Judge/Executive Mitch McConnell. Also, Heyburn served in the United States Army Reserve from 1970 to 1976.

== Federal judicial career ==
On the recommendation of Senator Mitch McConnell, Heyburn was nominated by President George H. W. Bush on March 20, 1992, to a seat vacated by Thomas A. Ballantine Jr. as Ballantine took senior status. Heyburn was confirmed by the United States Senate on August 12, 1992, on a Senate vote and received commission on August 17, 1992. He served as Chief Judge from 2001 to 2008. He took senior status on April 1, 2014. He served in that capacity until his death from liver cancer on April 29, 2015, at the age of 66, in Louisville.

In 1994, Chief Justice Rehnquist appointed Heyburn to serve on the Budget Committee of the Judicial Conference of the United States. In January 1997, Heyburn was appointed Chair of the Budget Committee and served in that capacity until December 2004. In that role Heyburn led the development of the appropriations request for the federal judiciary. He testified many times before various House and Senate committees on budget issues. He consulted with the Republic of Ireland judiciary during the reform of their justice system.

In June 2007, Chief Justice Roberts appointed Heyburn as Chair of the Judicial Panel on Multidistrict Litigation. The Panel decides whether cases in districts around the nation including overlapping nationwide or statewide class actions, should be centralized in a single judicial district for pretrial purposes.

Heyburn spoke throughout the country on the congressional budget process, the independent judiciary and the role of the Panel on Multidistrict Litigation in complex litigation.

== Notable cases ==
Heyburn presided over Maker's Mark v. Diageo North America, et al., 703 F. Supp. 2d 671 (W.D. Ky. 2010). Heyburn's ruling in that case was upheld on appeal to the Sixth Circuit; the appellate decision, Maker's Mark, 679 F.3d 410 (2012), written by Judge Boyce F. Martin, Jr., began: "All bourbon is whiskey, but not all whiskey is bourbon."

On February 11, 2014, Heyburn ruled in Bourke v. Beshear that the Commonwealth of Kentucky must recognize same-sex marriages performed in states where those unions are legal.

On July 1, 2014, Heyburn ruled again in favor of same sex marriage, declaring that same-sex couples have a right to marry in Kentucky. He wrote "In America, even sincere and long-hold religious beliefs do not trump the constitutional rights of those who happen to have been out-voted", in response to arguments put forth by attorney Leigh Latherow, who was hired by Gov. Steve Beshear to defend the ban. The argument put forth by the Ashland attorney was solely justified by the assertion that traditional marriages contribute to a more stable birth rate, which in turn bolsters the state's economic health. Heyburn was quoted, "These arguments are not those of serious people."

Legal offices
Preceded by Thomas A. Ballantine Jr.	Judge of the United States District Court for the Western District of Kentucky; 1992–2014	Succeeded by Rebecca Grady Jennings
Preceded by Charles Ralph Simpson III	Chief Judge of the United States District Court for the Western District of Kentucky; 2001–2008	Succeeded by Thomas B. Russell
