= Charles M. Allen =

American judge (1916–2000)

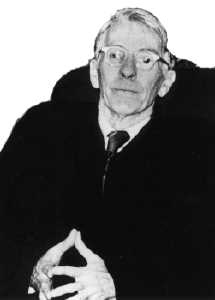

Senior Judge of the United States District Court for the Western District of Kentucky
- In office October 1, 1985 – January 4, 2000

Chief Judge of the United States District Court for the Western District of Kentucky
- In office 1977–1985
- Preceded by: Clifton Rhodes Bratcher
- Succeeded by: Edward Huggins Johnstone

Judge of the United States District Court for the Western District of Kentucky
- In office November 30, 1971 – October 1, 1985
- Appointed by: Richard Nixon
- Preceded by: Henry Luesing Brooks
- Succeeded by: Charles Ralph Simpson III

Personal details
- Born: Charles Mengel Allen; November 22, 1916 Louisville, Kentucky, U.S.
- Died: January 4, 2000 (aged 83) Louisville, Kentucky, U.S.
- Education: Yale University (B.A.); University of Louisville School of Law (LL.B.)

Charles Mengel Allen (November 22, 1916 – January 4, 2000) was a United States district judge of the United States District Court for the Western District of Kentucky.

== Education and career ==
Born in Louisville, Kentucky, Allen received a Bachelor of Arts degree from Yale University in 1941 and a Bachelor of Laws from the University of Louisville School of Law in 1943. He was in private practice from 1944 to 1945, and was teacher at Arizona Desert School in Tucson, Arizona, from 1945 to 1946, returning to private practice in Louisville, from 1946 to 1955. He was an Assistant United States Attorney for the Western District of Kentucky from 1955 to 1959, and was again in private practice in Louisville from 1959 to 1961. He was a judge of the Jefferson County Circuit Court, Fourth Chancery Division from 1961 to 1971.

== Federal judicial service ==
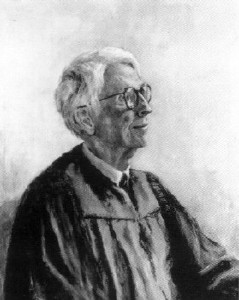
Judicial portrait of Allen, 1990, by Mary Cobb.

On November 17, 1971, Allen was nominated by President Richard Nixon to a seat on the United States District Court for the Western District of Kentucky vacated by Judge Henry Luesing Brooks. Allen was confirmed by the United States Senate on November 23, 1971, and received his commission on November 30, 1971. He served as Chief Judge from 1977 to 1985, assuming senior status on October 1, 1985, and serving in that capacity until his death on January 4, 2000, in Louisville.

== Sources ==
Legal offices
Preceded by Henry Luesing Brooks	Judge of the United States District Court for the Western District of Kentucky; 1971–1985	Succeeded by Charles Ralph Simpson III
Preceded by Clifton Rhodes Bratcher	Chief Judge of the United States District Court for the Western District of Kentucky; 1977–1985	Succeeded by Edward Huggins Johnstone
