= Rebecca Grady Jennings =

American judge (born 1978)

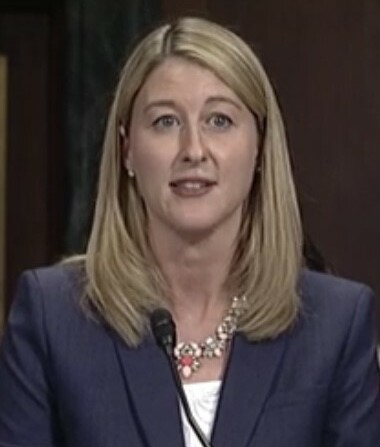

Judge of the United States District Court for the Western District of Kentucky
- Incumbent
- Assumed office April 19, 2018
- Appointed by: Donald Trump
- Preceded by: John G. Heyburn II

Personal details
- Born: Rebecca Christine Grady; 1978 (age 47–48) Wilmington, Delaware, U.S.
- Spouse: Patrick Jennings
- Education: Emory University (BA); American University (JD)

Rebecca Christine Grady Jennings (née Grady; born 1978) is a United States district judge of the United States District Court for the Western District of Kentucky.

== Biography ==
Jennings received her Bachelor of Arts from Emory University and Juris Doctor from the Washington College of Law at American University, where she served as a senior associate on the American University International Law Review.

In 2000 she was a student attorney for the American University Community and Economic Development Law Clinic and later a legal intern for District of Columbia Superior Court Judge Nan R. Shuker. In 2001 she was an equal justice foundation fellow for C-CAPE in Beaufort, North Carolina.

She began her legal career as a law clerk to Judge William Joseph Haynes Jr. of the United States District Court for the Middle District of Tennessee. Before becoming a judge, she worked as chair of Middleton Reutlinger's litigation practice, and her practice focused on civil litigation at both the trial and appellate levels in state and federal courts.

== Federal judicial service ==
On September 7, 2017, President Donald Trump nominated Jennings to serve as a United States District Judge of the United States District Court for the Western District of Kentucky, to the seat vacated by Judge John G. Heyburn II, who assumed senior status on April 1, 2014. A hearing on her nomination before the Senate Judiciary Committee was held on November 15, 2017. On December 7, 2017, her nomination was reported out of committee by voice vote. On April 12, 2018, the United States Senate invoked cloture on her nomination by a 94–2 vote. Her nomination was confirmed later that day by a voice vote. She received her commission on April 19, 2018.

== Notable cases ==
On April 21, 2022, Jennings temporarily blocked a Kentucky law that would ban abortions after 15 weeks. Jennings has not yet ruled on the law's constitutionality but agreed that more time is needed to determine "specifically determine which individual provisions and subsections are capable of compliance."

On July 21, 2025, Jennings sentenced former Kentucky police officer Brett Hankison to 33 months of imprisonment for using excessive force during the lethal raid that led to Breonna Taylor's death. He was the first police officer held criminally accountable in this case. Her ruling was in dissent from the Trump Department of Justice's recommendation of just one day in prison.

== Personal life ==
Jennings is married to Patrick Jennings, who works at Commonwealth Alliances, a lobbying firm.

Legal offices
Preceded by John G. Heyburn II	Judge of the United States District Court for the Western District of Kentucky; 2018–present	Incumbent
