= Thomas A. Ballantine Jr. =

American judge (1926–1992)

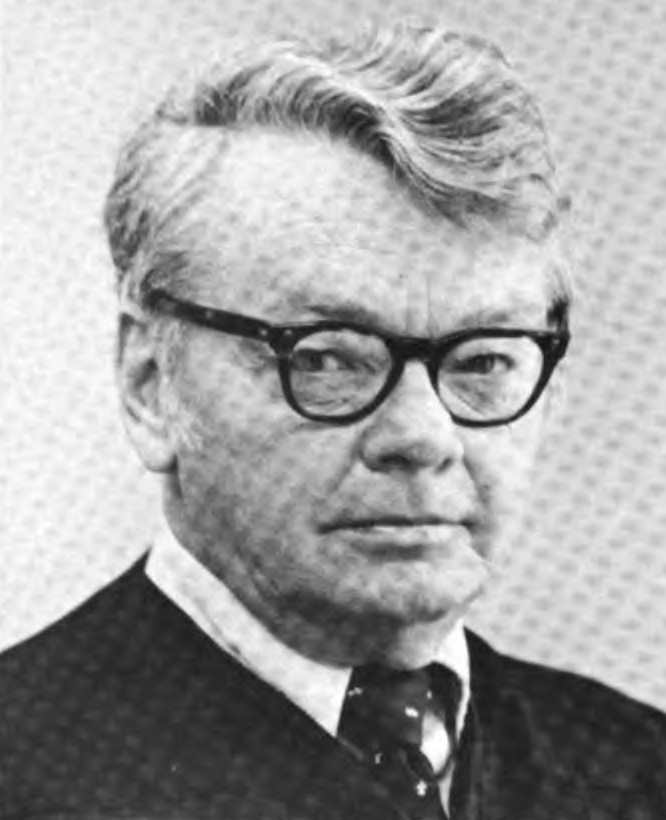

Senior Judge of the United States District Court for the Western District of Kentucky
- In office November 29, 1991 – February 18, 1992

Chief Judge of the United States District Court for the Western District of Kentucky
- In office 1990–1991
- Preceded by: Edward Huggins Johnstone
- Succeeded by: Ronald Edward Meredith

Judge of the United States District Court for the Western District of Kentucky
- In office October 12, 1977 – November 29, 1991
- Appointed by: Jimmy Carter
- Preceded by: Clifton Rhodes Bratcher
- Succeeded by: John G. Heyburn II

Personal details
- Born: Thomas Austin Ballantine Jr. September 22, 1926 Louisville, Kentucky, U.S.
- Died: February 18, 1992 (aged 65) Louisville, Kentucky, U.S.
- Education: University of Kentucky (BA); University of Louisville School of Law (LLB)

Thomas Austin Ballantine Jr. (September 22, 1926 – February 18, 1992) was a United States district judge of the United States District Court for the Western District of Kentucky.

== Education and career ==
Born in Louisville, Kentucky, Ballantine received a Bachelor of Arts degree from the University of Kentucky in 1948 and a Bachelor of Laws from the University of Louisville School of Law in 1954. He was in private practice in Louisville from 1954 to 1964. He was then a deputy commissioner for the Jefferson Circuit Court from 1958 to 1962, a commissioner for the Jefferson Fiscal Court from 1962 to 1964, and a judge on the Jefferson County Circuit Court in Louisville from 1964 to 1977. He was an instructor at the University of Louisville School of Law from 1969 to 1975.

== Federal judicial service ==
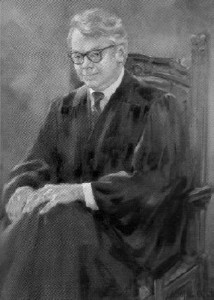
Judicial portrait of Ballantine, 1992, by John Michael Carter.

On September 27, 1977, Ballantine was nominated by President Jimmy Carter to a seat on the United States District Court for the Western District of Kentucky vacated by Judge Clifton Rhodes Bratcher. Ballantine was confirmed by the United States Senate on October 12, 1977, and received his commission the same day. He served as Chief Judge from 1990 to 1991, assuming senior status due to a certified disability on November 26, 1991. Ballantine served in that capacity for less than three months before his death February 18, 1992, in Louisville. He had been diagnosed with lung cancer in June 1991 and it was the progression of that condition that forced him to take senior status and ultimately resulted in his death.

== Sources ==
Legal offices
Preceded by Clifton Rhodes Bratcher	Judge of the United States District Court for the Western District of Kentucky; 1977–1991	Succeeded by John G. Heyburn II
Preceded by Edward Huggins Johnstone	Chief Judge of the United States District Court for the Western District of Kentucky; 1990–1991	Succeeded by Ronald Edward Meredith
