= James Fleming Gordon =

American judge

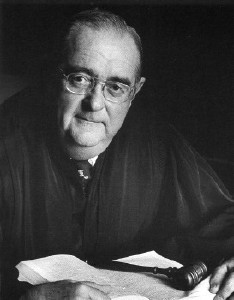

Senior Judge of the United States District Court for the Western District of Kentucky
- In office January 1, 1976 – February 9, 1990

Chief Judge of the United States District Court for the Western District of Kentucky
- In office 1969–1976
- Preceded by: Henry Luesing Brooks
- Succeeded by: Clifton Rhodes Bratcher

Judge of the United States District Court for the Western District of Kentucky
- In office July 23, 1965 – January 1, 1976
- Appointed by: Lyndon B. Johnson
- Preceded by: Roy Mahlon Shelbourne
- Succeeded by: Edward Huggins Johnstone

Personal details
- Born: James Fleming Gordon; May 18, 1918 Madisonville, Kentucky, U.S.
- Died: February 9, 1990 (aged 71)
- Education: University of Kentucky College of Law (LL.B.)

James Fleming Gordon (May 18, 1918 – February 9, 1990) was a United States district judge of the United States District Court for the Western District of Kentucky.

== Education and career ==
Born in Madisonville, Kentucky, Gordon received a Bachelor of Laws from the University of Kentucky College of Law in 1941. He was in private practice in Madisonville from 1941 to 1942, serving in the United States Army during World War II, from 1942 to 1945. He returned to private practice from 1945 to 1965, also serving as a campaign chairman for Kentucky Democratic Party in 1955, and as chairman of the Kentucky Public Service Commission from 1956 to 1960. He was a special counsel to the Governor of Kentucky in 1965, and speakers chairman of the Kentucky Democratic Party in 1966.

== Federal judicial service ==
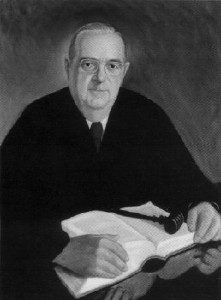
Judicial portrait of Gordon, c. 1976, by M.B.H.

On June 24, 1965, Gordon was nominated by President Lyndon B. Johnson to a seat on the United States District Court for the Western District of Kentucky vacated by Judge Roy Mahlon Shelbourne. Gordon was confirmed by the United States Senate on July 22, 1965, and received his commission on July 23, 1965. He served as Chief Judge from 1969 to 1976, assuming senior status due to a certified disability on January 1, 1976, and serving in that capacity until his death on February 9, 1990.

== Sources ==
Legal offices
Preceded by Roy Mahlon Shelbourne	Judge of the United States District Court for the Western District of Kentucky; 1965–1976	Succeeded by Edward Huggins Johnstone
Preceded by Henry Luesing Brooks	Chief Judge of the United States District Court for the Western District of Kentucky; 1969–1976	Succeeded by Clifton Rhodes Bratcher
