= Thomas B. Russell =

American judge

Thomas Banister Russell
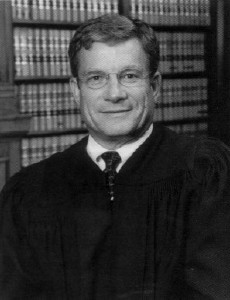

Judge of the United States Foreign Intelligence Surveillance Court
- In office May 19, 2015 – May 18, 2022
- Appointed by: John Roberts
- Preceded by: James Zagel
- Succeeded by: Joan N. Ericksen

Judge of the Alien Terrorist Removal Court
- In office 2016–2021
- Appointed by: John Roberts
- Preceded by: James C. Cacheris
- Succeeded by: Louis Guirola Jr.

Senior Judge of the United States District Court for the Western District of Kentucky
- In office November 15, 2011 – September 1, 2023

Chief Judge of the United States District Court for the Western District of Kentucky
- In office 2008–2011
- Preceded by: John G. Heyburn II
- Succeeded by: Joseph H. McKinley Jr.

Judge of the United States District Court for the Western District of Kentucky
- In office October 11, 1994 – November 15, 2011
- Appointed by: Bill Clinton
- Preceded by: Edward Huggins Johnstone
- Succeeded by: Gregory N. Stivers

Personal details
- Born: Thomas Banister Russell; November 15, 1945 (age 80) Louisville, Kentucky, U.S.
- Education: Western Kentucky University (BA); University of Kentucky (JD)

Thomas Banister Russell (born November 15, 1945) is a former United States district judge of the United States District Court for the Western District of Kentucky. He also served as a judge of the United States Foreign Intelligence Surveillance Court from 2015 to 2022. He served as a judge of the Alien Terrorist Removal Court from 2016 to 2021.

== Education and career ==
Born in Louisville, Kentucky, Russell received a Bachelor of Arts degree from Western Kentucky University in 1967 and a Juris Doctor from the University of Kentucky College of Law in 1970. He was in private practice in Paducah, Kentucky from 1970 to 1994.

=== Federal judicial service ===
On September 14, 1994, Russell was nominated by President Bill Clinton to a seat on the United States District Court for the Western District of Kentucky vacated by Edward Huggins Johnstone. Russell was confirmed by the United States Senate on October 7, 1994, and received his commission on October 11, 1994. He served as Chief Judge from 2008 to 2011. He took senior status on November 15, 2011. He served as a judge of the United States Foreign Intelligence Surveillance Court from 2015 to 2022. He served as a judge of the Alien Terrorist Removal Court from 2016 to 2021. He retired from active service on September 1, 2023.

== Sources ==
Legal offices
Preceded by Edward Huggins Johnstone	Judge of the United States District Court for the Western District of Kentucky; 1994–2011	Succeeded by Gregory N. Stivers
Preceded by John G. Heyburn II	Chief Judge of the United States District Court for the Western District of Kentucky; 2008–2011	Succeeded by Joseph H. McKinley Jr.
Preceded by James Zagel	Judge of the United States Foreign Intelligence Surveillance Court; 2015–2022	Succeeded by Joan N. Ericksen
Preceded by James C. Cacheris	Judge of the Alien Terrorist Removal Court; 2016–2021	Succeeded by Louis Guirola Jr.
