= Ronald Edward Meredith =

American judge

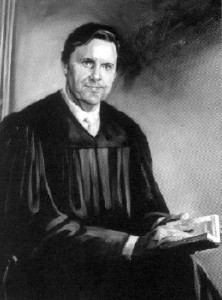
- Judicial portrait of Meredith, 1995, by Wendy Parkhurst.

Chief Judge of the United States District Court for the Western District of Kentucky
- In office 1991–1994
- Preceded by: Thomas A. Ballantine Jr.
- Succeeded by: Charles Ralph Simpson III

Judge of the United States District Court for the Western District of Kentucky
- In office April 4, 1985 – December 1, 1994
- Appointed by: Ronald Reagan
- Preceded by: Seat established by 98 Stat. 333
- Succeeded by: Joseph H. McKinley Jr.

Personal details
- Born: Ronald Edward Meredith; January 30, 1946 Clarkson, Kentucky, U.S.
- Died: December 1, 1994 (aged 48) Louisville, Kentucky, U.S.
- Education: Georgetown College (B.A.); George Washington University Law School (J.D.)

Ronald Edward Meredith (January 30, 1946 – December 1, 1994) was a United States district judge of the United States District Court for the Western District of Kentucky.

== Education and career ==
Born in Clarkson, Kentucky, Meredith received a Bachelor of Arts degree from Georgetown College in Georgetown, Kentucky in 1967 and a Juris Doctor from George Washington University Law School in 1971. He was the minority counsel for the United States Senate Judiciary Subcommittee on Penitentiaries from 1971 to 1972. He was a legislative assistant for United States Senator Marlow W. Cook of Kentucky from 1972 to 1975. He was in private practice in Elizabethtown, Kentucky from 1975 to 1981. He was district chairman for the Republican Party of Kentucky in the 2nd Congressional District from 1976 to 1980. He was the Chairman of the Kentucky State Republican Party in 1979. He was the United States Attorney for the Western District of Kentucky from 1981 to 1985. He was a Trustee of Georgetown College in Kentucky from 1983 to 1994. He was a Trustee of the Grace Evangelistic Association, Inc., from 1978 to 1994.

== Federal judicial service ==
Meredith was nominated by President Ronald Reagan on February 27, 1985, to the United States District Court for the Western District of Kentucky, to a new seat created by 98 Stat. 333. He was confirmed by the United States Senate on April 3, 1985, and received his commission on April 4, 1985. He served as Chief Judge from 1991 to 1994. Meredith served in that capacity until his death of pancreatic cancer on December 1, 1994, in Louisville, Kentucky.

== Sources ==
Legal offices
Preceded by Seat established by 98 Stat. 333	Judge of the United States District Court for the Western District of Kentucky; 1985–1994	Succeeded by Joseph H. McKinley Jr.
Preceded by Thomas A. Ballantine Jr.	Chief Judge of the United States District Court for the Western District of Kentucky; 1991–1994	Succeeded by Charles Ralph Simpson III
