= Henry Luesing Brooks =

American judge (1905–1971)

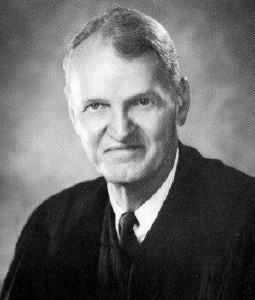

Judge of the United States Court of Appeals for the Sixth Circuit
- In office December 11, 1969 – December 30, 1971
- Appointed by: Richard Nixon
- Preceded by: Seat established by 82 Stat. 184
- Succeeded by: Pierce Lively

Chief Judge of the United States District Court for the Western District of Kentucky
- In office 1960–1969
- Preceded by: Roy Mahlon Shelbourne
- Succeeded by: James Fleming Gordon

Judge of the United States District Court for the Western District of Kentucky
- In office August 21, 1954 – December 12, 1969
- Appointed by: Dwight D. Eisenhower
- Preceded by: Seat established by 68 Stat. 8
- Succeeded by: Charles M. Allen

Personal details
- Born: Henry Luesing Brooks; December 5, 1905 Louisville, Kentucky, U.S.
- Died: December 30, 1971 (aged 66) Louisville, Kentucky, U.S.
- Education: University of Wisconsin (AB); Jefferson School of Law (LLB)

Henry Luesing Brooks (December 9, 1905 – December 30, 1971) was a United States circuit judge of the United States Court of Appeals for the Sixth Circuit and previously a United States district judge of the United States District Court for the Western District of Kentucky.

== Education and career ==
Born in Louisville, Kentucky, Brooks received an Artium Baccalaureus degree from the University of Wisconsin in 1927 and a Bachelor of Laws from the Jefferson School of Law (now the University of Louisville School of Law in 1929. He was in private practice in Louisville from 1929 to 1954. He was a United States Naval Reserve Lieutenant during World War II, from 1942 to 1945. He was a judge of the Jefferson County Circuit Court from 1946 to 1948, and was then a member of the faculty of the Jefferson School of Law from 1948 to 1952.

== Federal judicial service ==
On August 16, 1954, Brooks was nominated by President Dwight D. Eisenhower to a new seat on the United States District Court for the Western District of Kentucky created by 68 Stat. 8. He was confirmed by the United States Senate on August 18, 1954, and received his commission on August 21, 1954. He served as Chief Judge from 1960 to 1969. His service terminated on December 12, 1969, due to his elevation to the Sixth Circuit.

On August 13, 1969, President Richard Nixon nominated Brooks for elevation to a new seat on the United States Court of Appeals for the Sixth Circuit created by 82 Stat. 184. The Senate confirmed Brooks to the Sixth Circuit on December 10, 1969, and he received his commission on December 11, 1969. Brooks served in that capacity until his death on December 30, 1971, in Louisville.

== Sources ==
Legal offices
Preceded by Seat established by 68 Stat. 8	Judge of the United States District Court for the Western District of Kentucky; 1954–1969	Succeeded by Charles M. Allen
Preceded by Roy Mahlon Shelbourne	Chief Judge of the United States District Court for the Western District of Kentucky; 1960–1969	Succeeded by James Fleming Gordon
Preceded by Seat established by 82 Stat. 184	Judge of the United States Court of Appeals for the Sixth Circuit; 1969–1971	Succeeded by Pierce Lively
