= Joseph H. McKinley Jr. =

American judge (born 1954)

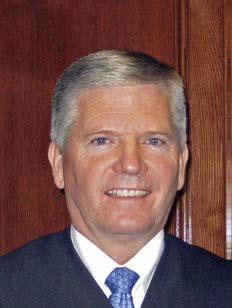

Senior Judge of the United States District Court for the Western District of Kentucky
- Incumbent
- Assumed office June 9, 2019

Chief Judge of the United States District Court for the Western District of Kentucky
- In office November 15, 2011 – November 15, 2018
- Preceded by: Thomas B. Russell
- Succeeded by: Gregory N. Stivers

Judge of the United States District Court for the Western District of Kentucky
- In office August 14, 1995 – June 9, 2019
- Appointed by: Bill Clinton
- Preceded by: Ronald E. Meredith
- Succeeded by: Justin R. Walker

Personal details
- Born: June 9, 1954 (age 71) Owensboro, Kentucky, U.S.
- Education: University of Kentucky (BS); University of Louisville School of Law (JD)

Joseph Henry McKinley Jr. (born June 9, 1954) is a senior United States district judge of the United States District Court for the Western District of Kentucky.

== Early life and education ==
Born in Owensboro, Kentucky, McKinley received a Bachelor of Science degree from the University of Kentucky in 1976 and a Juris Doctor from the University of Louisville School of Law in 1979.

== Career ==
McKinley was in private practice in Owensboro from 1979 to 1991. He was a Commissioner, Kentucky Oil and Gas Conservation Commission from 1982 to 1990. He was an Assistant county attorney of Daviess County, Kentucky from 1985 to 1987. He was a Hearing Officer, Natural Resources and Environmental Protection Cabinet from 1990 to 1991. McKinley was a judge on the Daviess County Circuit Court, Division I, Kentucky from 1992 to 1995.

== Federal judicial service ==
McKinley is a United States District Judge of the United States District Court for the Western District of Kentucky. McKinley was nominated by President Bill Clinton on May 24, 1995, to a seat vacated by Ronald E. Meredith. He was confirmed by the United States Senate on August 11, 1995, and received his commission on August 14, 1995. He served as chief judge of the court from November 15, 2011, to November 15, 2018. He assumed senior status on June 9, 2019.

== Sources ==
Legal offices
| Preceded by Ronald E. Meredith | Judge of the United States District Court for the Western District of Kentucky; 1995–2019 | Succeeded by Justin R. Walker |
| Preceded by Thomas B. Russell | Chief Judge of the United States District Court for the Western District of Kentucky; 2011–2018 | Succeeded by Gregory N. Stivers |
