= Clifton Rhodes Bratcher =

American judge (1917–1977)

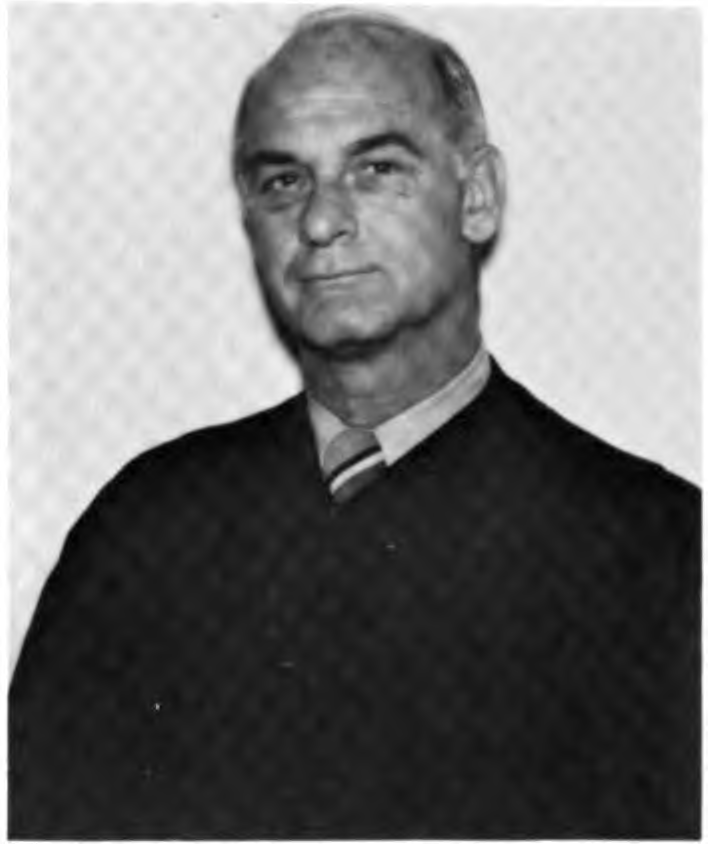

Chief Judge of the United States District Court for the Western District of Kentucky
- In office 1976–1977
- Preceded by: James Fleming Gordon
- Succeeded by: Charles M. Allen

Judge of the United States District Court for the Western District of Kentucky
- In office October 16, 1970 – July 25, 1977
- Appointed by: Richard Nixon
- Preceded by: Seat established by 84 Stat. 294
- Succeeded by: Thomas A. Ballantine Jr.

Personal details
- Born: Clifton Rhodes Bratcher; December 23, 1917 Morgantown, Kentucky, U.S.
- Died: July 25, 1977 (aged 59)
- Education: University of Louisville School of Law (LL.B.)

Clifton Rhodes Bratcher (December 23, 1917 – July 25, 1977) was a United States district judge of the United States District Court for the Western District of Kentucky.

== Education and career ==
Born in Morgantown, Kentucky, Bratcher was a Sergeant in the United States Army during World War II, from 1941 to 1945, and then received a Bachelor of Laws from the University of Louisville School of Law in 1947. He was the county attorney of Butler County in Morgantown, Kentucky from 1950 to 1953. He was a Chief Assistant United States Attorney for the Western District of Kentucky from 1953 to 1955, thereafter entering private practice in Owensboro, Kentucky from 1956 to 1970.

== Federal judicial service ==
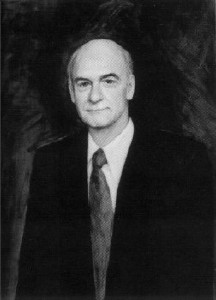
Judicial portrait of Bratcher, 1981.

On October 7, 1970, Bratcher was nominated by President Richard Nixon to a new seat on the United States District Court for the Western District of Kentucky created by 84 Stat. 294. He was confirmed by the United States Senate on October 13, 1970, and received his commission on October 16, 1970. He served as Chief Judge from 1976 until his death on July 25, 1977.

== Sources ==
Legal offices
Preceded by Seat established by 84 Stat. 294	Judge of the United States District Court for the Western District of Kentucky; 1970–1977	Succeeded by Thomas A. Ballantine Jr.
Preceded by James Fleming Gordon	Chief Judge of the United States District Court for the Western District of Kentucky; 1976–1977	Succeeded by Charles M. Allen
