= Pierce Lively =

American judge (1921–2016)

Senior Judge of the United States Court of Appeals for the Sixth Circuit
- In office January 1, 1989 – March 12, 2016

Chief Judge of the United States Court of Appeals for the Sixth Circuit
- In office October 1, 1983 – March 31, 1988
- Preceded by: George Clifton Edwards Jr.
- Succeeded by: Albert J. Engel Jr.

Judge of the United States Court of Appeals for the Sixth Circuit
- In office October 5, 1972 – January 1, 1989
- Appointed by: Richard Nixon
- Preceded by: Henry Luesing Brooks
- Succeeded by: Alice M. Batchelder

Personal details
- Born: Frederick Pierce Lively; August 17, 1921 Louisville, Kentucky, U.S.
- Died: March 12, 2016 (aged 94)
- Education: Centre College (AB); University of Virginia (LLB)

Frederick Pierce Lively (August 17, 1921 – March 12, 2016) was a United States circuit judge of the United States Court of Appeals for the Sixth Circuit.

== Education and career ==
Born in Louisville, Kentucky, Lively received an Artium Baccalaureus degree from Centre College in 1943 and served as a Lieutenant (J.G.) in the United States Naval Reserve during World War II, from 1943 to 1946. He received a Bachelor of Laws from the University of Virginia School of Law in 1948, and was a law clerk to Judge Shackelford Miller Jr. of the United States Court of Appeals for the Sixth Circuit from 1948 to 1949. Lively was in private practice in Danville, Kentucky from 1949 to 1972.

== Federal judicial service ==
On September 12, 1972, Lively was nominated by President Richard Nixon to a seat on the United States Court of Appeals for the Sixth Circuit vacated by Judge Henry Luesing Brooks. Lively was confirmed by the United States Senate on October 3, 1972, and received his commission on October 5, 1972. He served as Chief Judge from 1983 to 1988, assuming senior status on January 1, 1989. He stopped hearing cases on December 31, 2007, but remained in senior status until his death on March 12, 2016.

== See also ==
- List of United States federal judges by longevity of service

Legal offices
Preceded by Henry Luesing Brooks	Judge of the United States Court of Appeals for the Sixth Circuit; 1972–1989	Succeeded by Alice M. Batchelder
Preceded by George Clifton Edwards Jr.	Chief Judge of the United States Court of Appeals for the Sixth Circuit; 1983–1988	Succeeded by Albert J. Engel Jr.
