= United States District Court for the Western District of Kentucky =

United States federal district court in Kentucky

Coordinates: 37.2°N 87.1°W

- (W.D. Ky.)
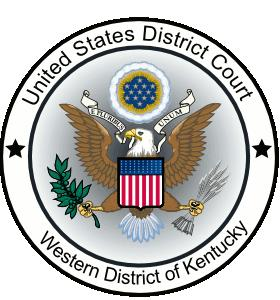

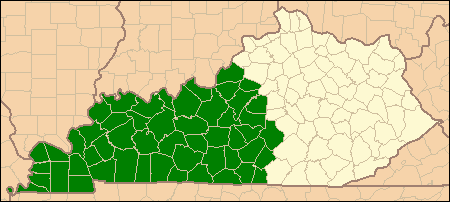
- Location: Gene Snyder U.S. Courthouse (Louisville) More locations: William H. Natcher Federal Building and U.S. Courthouse (Bowling Green); Owensboro; Paducah
- Appeals to: Sixth Circuit
- Established: February 12, 1901
- Judges: 5
- Chief Judge: David J. Hale

Officers of the court
- U.S. Attorney: Kyle G. Baumgarner
- U.S. Marshal: Gary B. Burman
- www.kywd.uscourts.gov

The United States District Court for the Western District of Kentucky (in case citations, W.D. Ky.) is the federal district court for the western part of the state of Kentucky.

Appeals from the Western District of Kentucky are taken to the United States Court of Appeals for the Sixth Circuit in Cincinnati, Ohio (except for patent claims and claims against the U.S. government under the Tucker Act, which are appealed to the Federal Circuit).

== Jurisdiction ==
Jurisdiction includes the following Kentucky counties: Adair, Allen, Ballard, Barren, Breckinridge, Bullitt, Butler, Caldwell, Calloway, Carlisle, Casey, Christian, Clinton, Crittenden, Cumberland, Daviess, Edmonson, Fulton, Graves, Grayson, Green, Hancock, Hardin, Hart, Henderson, Hickman, Hopkins, Jefferson, LaRue, Livingston, Logan, Lyon, Marion, Marshall, McCracken, McLean, Meade, Metcalfe, Monroe, Muhlenberg, Nelson, Ohio, Oldham, Russell, Simpson, Spencer, Taylor, Todd, Trigg, Union, Warren, Washington, and Webster.

The following counties are in the Louisville Division: Breckinridge, Bullitt, Hardin, Jefferson, LaRue, Marion, Meade, Nelson, Oldham, Spencer, and Washington.

The following counties are in the Bowling Green Division: Adair, Allen, Barren, Butler, Casey, Clinton, Cumberland, Edmonson, Green, Hart, Logan, Metcalf, Monroe, Russell, Simpson, Taylor, Todd, and Warren.

The following counties are in the Owensboro Division: Daviess, Grayson, Hancock, Henderson, Hopkins, McLean, Muhlenberg, Ohio, Union, and Webster.

The following counties are in the Paducah Division: Ballard, Caldwell, Calloway, Carlisle, Christian, Crittenden, Fulton, Graves, Hickman, Livingston, Lyon, McCracken, Marshall, and Trigg.

== History ==
The United States District Court for the District of Kentucky was one of the original 13 courts established by the Judiciary Act of 1789, 1 Stat. 73, on September 24, 1789. At the time, Kentucky was not yet a state, but was within the territory of the state of Virginia. The District was unchanged when Kentucky became a state on June 1, 1792. On February 13, 1801, the Judiciary Act of 1801, 2 Stat. 89, abolished the U.S. district court in Kentucky, but the repeal of this Act restored the District on March 8, 1802, 2 Stat. 132. The District was subdivided into Eastern and Western Districts on February 12, 1901, by 31 Stat. 781.

== Meeting places ==
The court is based in Louisville and also holds sessions in federal courthouses in Bowling Green, Owensboro, and Paducah. The United States Court of Appeals for the Sixth Circuit in Cincinnati, Ohio maintains appellate jurisdiction over the district. Its court in Louisville is located at the Gene Snyder U.S. Courthouse.

== Current judges ==
As of November 15, 2025:

#	Title	Judge	Duty station	Born	Term of service			Appointed by
#	Title	Judge	Duty station	Born	Active	Chief	Senior	Appointed by
22	Chief Judge	David J. Hale	Louisville	1967	2014–present	2025–present	—	Obama
21	District Judge	Gregory N. Stivers	Bowling Green; Louisville; Paducah	1960	2014–present	2018–2025	—	Obama
23	District Judge	Claria Boom (Note: Judge Boom is jointly appointed to the Eastern and Western Districts of Kentucky.)	Louisville	1969	2018–present	—	—	Trump
24	District Judge	Rebecca Jennings	Louisville	1978	2018–present	—	—	Trump
26	District Judge	Benjamin Beaton	Louisville	1981	2020–present	—	—	Trump
16	Senior Judge	Charles Simpson III	Louisville	1945	1986–2013	1994–2001	2013–present	Reagan
20	Senior Judge	Joseph McKinley Jr.	Louisville; Owensboro	1954	1995–2019	2011–2018	2019–present	Clinton

== Former judges ==
#	Judge	Born–died	Active service	Chief Judge	Senior status	Appointed by	Reason for termination
1	Walter Evans	1842–1923	1901–1923 (Note: Reassigned from the District of Kentucky.)	—	—	McKinley/Operation of law	death
2	Charles Moorman	1876–1938	1924–1925	—	—	Coolidge	elevation
3	Charles I. Dawson	1881–1969	1925–1935	—	—	Coolidge	resignation
4	Elwood Hamilton	1883–1945	1935–1938	—	—	F. Roosevelt	elevation
5	Mac Swinford	1899–1975	1937–1975 (Note: Jointly appointed to the Eastern and Western Districts of Kentucky.)	—	—	F. Roosevelt	death
6	Shackelford Miller Jr.	1892–1965	1939–1945	—	—	F. Roosevelt	elevation
7	Roy Mahlon Shelbourne	1890–1974	1946–1964	1948–1960	1964–1974	Truman	death
8	Henry Luesing Brooks	1905–1971	1954–1969	1960–1969	—	Eisenhower	elevation
9	James Fleming Gordon	1918–1990	1965–1976	1969–1976	1976–1990	L. Johnson	death
10	Clifton Rhodes Bratcher	1917–1977	1970–1977	1976–1977	—	Nixon	death
11	Charles M. Allen	1916–2000	1971–1985	1977–1985	1985–2000	Nixon	death
12	Eugene E. Siler Jr.	1936–present	1975–1991	—	—	Ford	elevation
13	Edward Johnstone	1922–2013	1977–1993	1985–1990	1993–2013	Carter	death
14	Thomas A. Ballantine Jr.	1926–1992	1977–1991	1990–1991	1991–1992	Carter	death
15	Ronald Edward Meredith	1946–1994	1985–1994	1991–1994	—	Reagan	death
17	John G. Heyburn II	1948–2015	1992–2014	2001–2008	2014–2015	G.H.W. Bush	death
18	Jennifer B. Coffman	1948–present	1993–2013	—	—	Clinton	retirement
19	Thomas B. Russell	1945–present	1994–2011	2008–2011	2011–2023	Clinton	retirement
25	Justin R. Walker	1982–present	2019–2020	—	—	Trump	elevation

== Chief judges ==
Chief judges have administrative responsibilities with respect to their district court. Unlike the Supreme Court, where one justice is specifically nominated to be chief, the office of chief judge rotates among the district court judges. To be chief, a judge must have been in active service on the court for at least one year, be under the age of 65, and have not previously served as chief judge.

A vacancy is filled by the judge highest in seniority among the group of qualified judges. The chief judge serves for a term of seven years, or until age 70, whichever occurs first. The age restrictions are waived if no members of the court would otherwise be qualified for the position.

When the office was created in 1948, the chief judge was the longest-serving judge who had not elected to retire, on what has since 1958 been known as senior status, or declined to serve as chief judge. After August 6, 1959, judges could not become or remain chief after turning 70 years old. The current rules have been in operation since October 1, 1982.

== Succession of seats ==
Seat 1
Seat reassigned from District of Kentucky on February 12, 1901 by 31 Stat. 781
Evans	1901–1923
Moorman	1924–1925
Dawson	1925–1935
Hamilton	1935–1938
Miller, Jr.	1939–1945
Shelbourne	1946–1964
Gordon	1965–1976
Johnstone	1977–1993
Russell	1994–2011
Stivers	2014–present

Seat 2
Seat established on June 22, 1936 by 49 Stat. 1806 (concurrent with Eastern District)
Swinford	1937–1975
Siler, Jr.	1975–1991
Coffman	1993–2013
Boom	2018–present

Seat 3
Seat established on February 10, 1954 by 68 Stat. 8
Brooks	1954–1969
Allen	1971–1985
Simpson III	1986–2013
Hale	2014–present

Seat 4
Seat established on June 2, 1970 by 84 Stat. 294
Bratcher	1970–1977
Ballantine, Jr.	1977–1991
Heyburn II	1992–2014
Jennings	2018–present

Seat 5
Seat established on July 10, 1984 by 98 Stat. 333
Meredith	1985–1994
McKinley, Jr.	1995–2019
Walker	2019–2020
Beaton	2020–present

== U.S. Attorneys ==
The United States Attorney's Office for the Western District of Kentucky represents the United States in civil and criminal litigation in the court. The current United States Attorney is Kyle G. Bumgarner, who was sworn into office on June 2, 2025.

- Ruben D. Hill 1898–1906
- George DuRelle 1906–14
- Perry B. Miller 1914–19
- W. Voris Gregory 1919–22
- W. Sherman Ball 1922–27
- Thomas Sparks Jr. 1927–35
- Bunk Gardner 1935–38
- Eli H. Brown III 1938–45
- David C. Walls 1945–53
- Charles F. Wood 1953–54
- J. Leonard Walker 1954–59
- William B. Jones 1959–61
- William E. Scent 1961–65
- Boyce F. Martin Jr. 1965
- Ernest W. Rivers 1965–70
- John T. Smith 1970
- George J. Long Jr. 1970–77
- J. Albert Jones 1977–80
- John L. Smith 1980–81
- Alexander T. Taft Jr. 1981
- Ronald E. Meredith 1981–85
- Alexander T. Taft Jr. 1985–86
- Joseph M. Whittle 1986–93
- W. Michael Troop 1993–99
- Steven S. Reed 1999-2001
- Steve Pence 2001–2003
- David L. Huber 2003–2009
- David J. Hale 2010–2014
- John E. Kuhn Jr. 2014-2017
- Russell Coleman 2017–2021
- Michael A. Bennett 2021–2025
- Kyle G. Bumgarner 2025–present

== See also ==
- Courts of Kentucky
- List of current United States district judges
- List of United States federal courthouses in Kentucky
