= Gregory N. Stivers =

American judge (born 1960)

Gregory Stivers
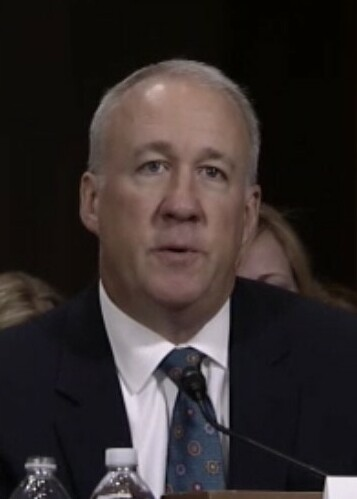
- Stivers in 2014

Chief Judge of the United States District Court for the Western District of Kentucky
- In office November 15, 2018 – November 15, 2025
- Preceded by: Joseph H. McKinley Jr.
- Succeeded by: David J. Hale

Judge of the United States District Court for the Western District of Kentucky
- Incumbent
- Assumed office December 5, 2014
- Appointed by: Barack Obama
- Preceded by: Thomas B. Russell

Personal details
- Born: Gregory Neil Stivers; June 20, 1960 (age 65) Hazard, Kentucky, U.S.
- Party: Republican
- Education: Eastern Kentucky University (BA); University of Kentucky (JD)

Gregory Neil Stivers (born June 20, 1960) is a United States district judge of the United States District Court for the Western District of Kentucky.

== Biography ==
Stivers was born on June 20, 1960, in Hazard, Kentucky. He received a Bachelor of Arts degree in 1982 from Eastern Kentucky University. He received a Juris Doctor in 1985 from the University of Kentucky College of Law. He spent his entire legal career at the Bowling Green, Kentucky, law firm of Kerrick, Stivers, Coyle, PLC, formerly known as Campbell, Kerrick and Grise, joining as an associate in 1985 and becoming partner in 1990, leaving in 2014 upon receiving his judicial commission. His legal practice focused on employment and general civil litigation in Federal and State courts. He also served as the designated outside legal counsel for Western Kentucky University.

=== Federal judicial service ===
On June 19, 2014, President Barack Obama nominated Stivers to serve as a United States district judge of the United States District Court for the Western District of Kentucky, to the seat vacated by Judge Thomas B. Russell, who assumed senior status on November 15, 2011. On July 29, 2014, a hearing before the United States Senate Committee on the Judiciary was held on his nomination. On September 18, 2014, his nomination was reported out of committee by a voice vote. On December 3, 2014, Senate Majority Leader Harry Reid filed a cloture motion on his nomination. On December 4, 2014, the United States Senate invoked cloture on his nomination by a 69–24 vote. Later that day, Stivers was confirmed by a voice vote. He received his judicial commission on December 5, 2014.

== Personal ==
Stivers is a neighbor of Senator Rand Paul. At the time of Stivers' nomination, Paul's Senate office in Bowling Green was in the same building that housed Stivers' law firm.

Legal offices
Preceded by Thomas B. Russell	Judge of the United States District Court for the Western District of Kentucky; 2014–present	Incumbent
Preceded by Joseph H. McKinley Jr.	Chief Judge of the United States District Court for the Western District of Kentucky; 2018–2025	Succeeded by David J. Hale
