= Roy Mahlon Shelbourne =

American judge

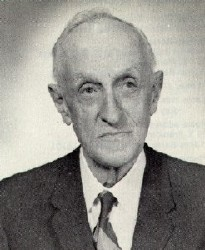

Senior Judge of the United States District Court for the Western District of Kentucky
- In office November 1, 1964 – December 29, 1974

Chief Judge of the United States District Court for the Western District of Kentucky
- In office 1948–1960
- Preceded by: Office established
- Succeeded by: Henry Luesing Brooks

Judge of the United States District Court for the Western District of Kentucky
- In office February 8, 1946 – November 1, 1964
- Appointed by: Harry S. Truman
- Preceded by: Shackelford Miller Jr.
- Succeeded by: James Fleming Gordon

Personal details
- Born: Roy Mahlon Shelbourne; November 12, 1890 Bardwell, Kentucky, U.S.
- Died: December 29, 1974 (aged 84) Louisville, Kentucky, U.S.
- Education: Union University (A.B.); Cumberland School of Law (LL.B.)

Roy Mahlon Shelbourne (November 12, 1890 – December 29, 1974) was a United States district judge of the United States District Court for the Western District of Kentucky.

== Education and career ==
Born in Bardwell, Kentucky, Shelbourne received an Artium Baccalaureus degree from Union University in Jackson, Tennessee in 1912 and a Bachelor of Laws from Cumberland School of Law (then part of Cumberland University, now part of Samford University) in 1913. He entered private practice in Bardwell from 1913 to 1927. He was county attorney of Carlisle County, Kentucky from 1918 to 1926. He was President of the Bardwell Deposit Bank from 1926 to 1936. He returned to private practice in Paducah, Kentucky from 1936 to 1946.

== Federal judicial service ==
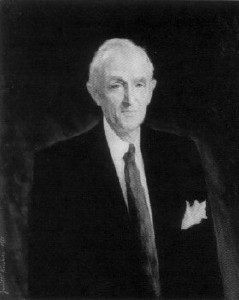
Judicial portrait of Shelbourne, 1981, by Judith Kuehn.

Shelbourne was nominated by President Harry S. Truman on January 17, 1946, to a seat on the United States District Court for the Western District of Kentucky vacated by Judge Shackelford Miller Jr. He was confirmed by the United States Senate on February 5, 1946, and received his commission on February 8, 1946. He served as Chief Judge from 1948 to 1960. He assumed senior status on November 1, 1964. Shelbourne served in that capacity until his death on December 29, 1974, in Louisville, Kentucky.

== Sources ==
Legal offices
Preceded by Shackelford Miller Jr.	Judge of the United States District Court for the Western District of Kentucky; 1946–1964	Succeeded by James Fleming Gordon
Preceded by Office established	Chief Judge of the United States District Court for the Western District of Kentucky; 1948–1960	Succeeded by Henry Luesing Brooks
