= Edward Huggins Johnstone =

American judge (1922–2013)

Edward H. Johnstone
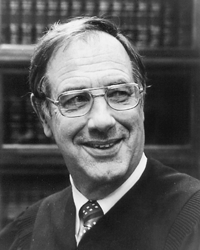

Senior Judge of the United States District Court for the Western District of Kentucky
- In office October 22, 1993 – June 26, 2013

Chief Judge of the United States District Court for the Western District of Kentucky
- In office 1985–1990
- Preceded by: Charles M. Allen
- Succeeded by: Thomas A. Ballantine Jr.

Judge of the United States District Court for the Western District of Kentucky
- In office October 11, 1977 – October 22, 1993
- Appointed by: Jimmy Carter
- Preceded by: James Fleming Gordon
- Succeeded by: Thomas B. Russell

Personal details
- Born: Edward Huggins Johnstone; April 26, 1922 São Paulo, Brazil
- Died: June 26, 2013 (aged 91) Louisville, Kentucky, U.S.
- Education: University of Kentucky College of Law (JD)

Military service
- Allegiance: United States of America
- Branch/service: United States Army
- Years of service: 1942–1945
- Rank: Sergeant
- Unit: 9th Infantry Division
- Battles/wars: Battle of the Bulge
- Awards: Silver Star; Bronze Star

Edward Huggins Johnstone (April 26, 1922 – June 26, 2013) was a United States district judge of the United States District Court for the Western District of Kentucky.

== Education and career ==
Johnstone was born on April 26, 1922, in São Paulo, Brazil, the son of William Johnstone, a horticulturalist. He grew up in Paducah, Kentucky and attended high school in Lexington. After graduation, he attended the University of Kentucky until 1942, when he dropped out to join the United States Army. Johnstone was a sergeant in the 9th Infantry Division during World War II, serving from 1942 to 1945. He fought in the Battle of the Bulge, earning a Bronze Star Medal and Silver Star Medal for his gallantry. Returning home, Johnstone resumed his studies, earning a Juris Doctor from the University of Kentucky College of Law in 1949. He married Kay Johnstone and had four children. He was in private practice in Princeton, Kentucky from 1949 to 1976, and was the Princeton city attorney from 1952 to 1954. He was the city attorney of Kuttawa, Kentucky from 1954 to 1976, of Fredonia, Kentucky from 1954 to 1976 and also the city judge on the Princeton, Kentucky Police Court from 1954 to 1969, holding these positions concurrently. He was a judge of the 56th Judicial Circuit Court of the State of Kentucky from 1976 to 1977.

== Federal judicial service ==
On August 25, 1977, Johnstone was nominated by President Jimmy Carter to a seat on the United States District Court for the Western District of Kentucky vacated by Judge James Fleming Gordon. Johnstone was confirmed by the United States Senate on October 7, 1977, and received his commission on October 11, 1977. He served as Chief Judge from 1985 to 1990, and assumed senior status on October 22, 1993, serving in that status until his death.

== Death ==
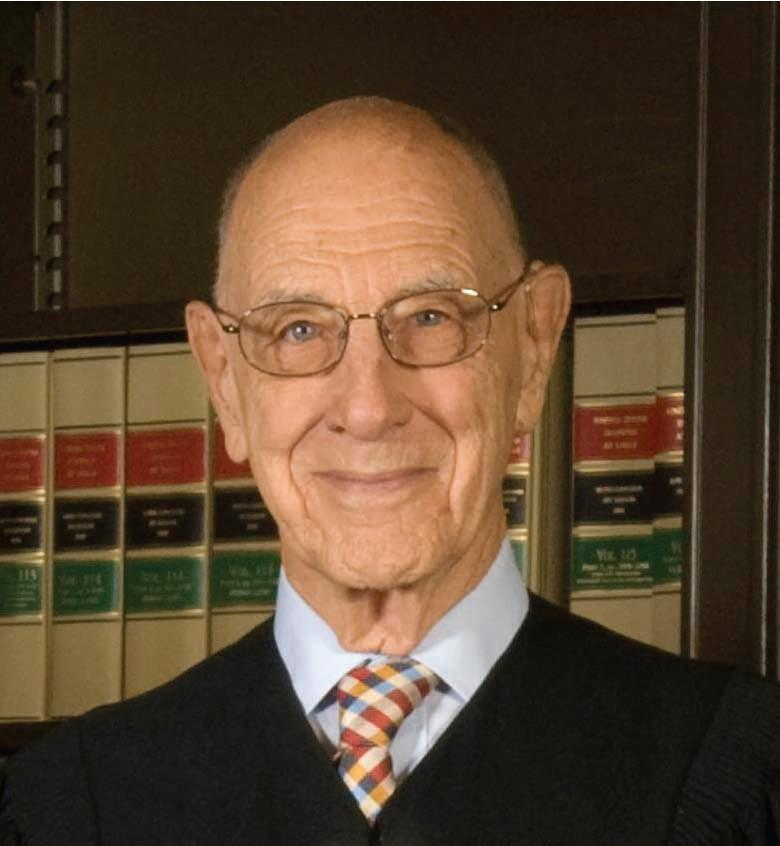
Johnstone in the 2000s.

Johnstone died on June 26, 2013, in Louisville, Kentucky at the age of 91.

== Sources ==
Legal offices
Preceded by James Fleming Gordon	Judge of the United States District Court for the Western District of Kentucky; 1977–1993	Succeeded by Thomas B. Russell
Preceded by Charles M. Allen	Chief Judge of the United States District Court for the Western District of Kentucky; 1985–1990	Succeeded by Thomas A. Ballantine Jr.
