= David L. Huber =

American attorney

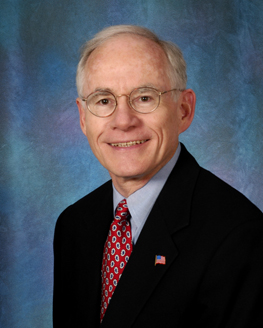
David L. Huber

David L. Huber is an American attorney who is the retired United States attorney for the Western District of Kentucky.

Huber was nominated by President George W. Bush and he was confirmed by the United States Senate on December 9, 2003. Prior to his confirmation, he was an assistant United States attorney specializing in civil defensive litigation.

Huber was born in Louisville and received a BA in political science from the University of Louisville where he became a member of Phi Kappa Tau fraternity. He also earned a Juris Doctor from the University of Louisville Louis D. Brandeis School of Law in 1968.

Huber began his legal practice in Louisville where he was an associate with Fred M. Goldberg. While practicing with Mr. Goldberg, he had a general civil practice and tried his first civil jury trial in Shelby Circuit Court. He later became a legislative assistant and later chief legislative assistant to former U.S. senator Marlow Cook.

Upon leaving the U.S. Senate, he served as an assistant U.S. attorney in the Western District of Kentucky for five and a half years as a criminal prosecutor and civil trial attorney. In those positions, Huber had extensive litigation experience in both civil and criminal cases and Grand Jury investigations. Huber received the Commissioner's Special Citation, United States Food and Drug Administration, in recognition of distinguished performance in litigation.

In 1978, Huber was appointed by Jefferson County Judge/Executive Mitch McConnell as Jefferson County Government's chief administrative officer, where for seven years he served as the county's chief operating officer with responsibility for the executive departments such as police, corrections, and others, including the budget and personnel, in the implementation of county services.

Huber also held legal and executive positions with two Louisville companies. After leaving Jefferson County Government, he became second vice president and director of government relations and compliance with the former Capital Holding Corporation (Providian), a diversified insurance and financial services company and then was vice president and general counsel of the Old Glenmore Distilleries Company, a spirits and wine company.

Before returning to the United States Attorney's Office in 1991, he was general counsel to U.S. senator Mitch McConnell.

Huber retired on January 31, 2009.

Legal offices
Preceded by Steve Pence	United States Attorney for the Western District of Kentucky; 2003–2009	Succeeded by David J. Hale
