= David J. Hale =

American judge (born 1967)

David Hale
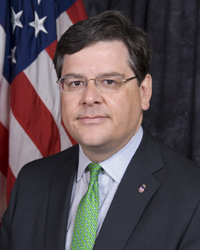
- Portrait as United States Attorney

Chief Judge of the United States District Court for the Western District of Kentucky
- Incumbent
- Assumed office November 15, 2025
- Preceded by: Gregory N. Stivers

Judge of the United States District Court for the Western District of Kentucky
- Incumbent
- Assumed office December 10, 2014
- Appointed by: Barack Obama
- Preceded by: Charles Ralph Simpson III

United States Attorney for the Western District of Kentucky
- In office May 7, 2010 – December 10, 2014
- Appointed by: Barack Obama
- Preceded by: David L. Huber
- Succeeded by: John Kuhn

Personal details
- Born: David Jason Hale; June 30, 1967 (age 59) Fort Campbell, Kentucky, U.S.
- Education: Vanderbilt University (BA); University of Kentucky (JD)

David Jason Hale (born June 30, 1967) is the chief United States district judge of the United States District Court for the Western District of Kentucky and former United States attorney for the Western District of Kentucky.

== Biography ==
Hale was born on June 30, 1967 at the United States Army hospital at Fort Campbell, Kentucky. He received a Bachelor of Arts degree in 1989 from Vanderbilt University. He received a Juris Doctor in 1992 from the University of Kentucky College of Law. From 1992 to 1994, he was an associate at the law firm of Brown, Todd and Heyburn. From 1995 to 1999, he served as an assistant United States attorney for the Western District of Kentucky. He joined the law firm of Reed, Weitkamp, Schell & Vice, PLLC, in 1999, becoming a partner in 2002, serving until his appointment as United States attorney.

=== United States attorney ===
On January 20, 2010, President Obama nominated Hale to serve as the United States Attorney for the Western District of Kentucky, in place of David L. Huber who had resigned. His nomination was reported by the Senate Judiciary Committee on April 22, 2010, and he was confirmed by the Senate on April 29, 2010. He took the oath of office on May 7, 2010.

=== Federal judicial service ===
On June 19, 2014, President Barack Obama nominated Hale to serve as a United States District Judge of the United States District Court for the Western District of Kentucky, to the seat vacated by Judge Charles Ralph Simpson III, who assumed senior status on February 1, 2013. On July 29, 2014, a hearing before the United States Senate Committee on the Judiciary was held on his nomination. On September 18, 2014, his nomination was reported out of committee by a voice vote. On December 1, 2014, Senate Majority Leader Harry Reid filed for cloture on his nomination. On December 3, 2014, the United States Senate invoked cloture on his nomination by a 65–31 vote. He was later confirmed by a voice vote that same day. He received his judicial commission on December 10, 2014. He became the court's chief judge in 2025.

=== Notable case ===
On March 31, 2017, Hale ruled against the dismissal of a lawsuit accusing Donald Trump of inciting violence against protesters in Louisville, Kentucky. During a campaign rally on March 1, 2016, Trump repeatedly said "get 'em out of here" while pointing at anti-Trump protesters. According to the protesters, as they were escorted out they were repeatedly shoved and punched by his supporters. Trump's attorneys moved for dismissal of the case, arguing he was protected by free speech laws, and wasn't trying to get his supporters to resort to violence.

Legal offices
Preceded by Charles Ralph Simpson III	Judge of the United States District Court for the Western District of Kentucky; 2014–present	Incumbent
Preceded by Gregory N. Stivers	Chief Judge of the United States District Court for the Western District of Kentucky; 2025–present	Incumbent
