= Breonna Taylor =

American woman killed by police (1993–2020)

- Taylor at a graduation ceremony in Louisville, Kentucky
- Born: June 5, 1993; Grand Rapids, Michigan, U.S.
- Died: March 13, 2020 (aged 26); Louisville, Kentucky, U.S.
- Cause of death: Gunshot wound
- Resting place: Spring Valley Funeral Home, New Albany, Indiana, U.S.
- Education: University of Kentucky
- Occupations: Emergency medical technician; Emergency room technician
- Known for: Circumstances of her death

Breonna Taylor (June 5, 1993 – March 13, 2020) was an African-American woman who was shot and killed while asleep in her Louisville, Kentucky home by Louisville Metro Police Department (LMPD) police officers who entered under the auspices of a "no-knock" search warrant. Taylor's boyfriend, Kenneth Walker, fired a shot, hitting officer Jonathan Mattingly. Mattingly and two other LMPD officers, Brett Hankison and Myles Cosgrove, opened fire. It was determined that Cosgrove fired the fatal shot to Taylor - who was unarmed - and that none of Hankison's shots hit anyone. A grand jury chose not to indict Mattingly or Cosgrove, with prosecutors saying their use of force was justified. The grand jury did indict Hankison on felony wanton endangerment of Taylor's neighbors, for which he was later acquitted. After this, the Department of Justice (DOJ) charged Hankison with violating Taylor's civil rights. He was found guilty in November 2024 and sentenced to 33 months (2 3/4 years) in prison. The DOJ also charged three other officers, who were not present at the shooting, with conspiracy in falsifying evidence to procure the search warrant, and then covering it up. Those charges were later dropped.

Originally from Grand Rapids, Michigan, Taylor worked as an on-call Emergency Room Technician and first responder in the local area at the time of her death. Her controversial death followed the murder of Ahmaud Arbery (February 23, 2020) and preceded the murder of George Floyd (May 25, 2020). All three deaths spurred an outpouring of protests and became a rallying cry for the Black Lives Matter movement in summer 2020. Supporters adopted the motto #SayHerName in Taylor's memory bringing attention to Black women who are killed by police officers.

== Early life and childhood ==
Breonna Taylor was born in Grand Rapids, Michigan, on June 5, 1993, to Tamika Palmer and Everette "Skeeter" Taylor. In 2008, she moved to Louisville, Kentucky, with her mother and younger sister, Ju'Niyah. Taylor attended Western High School, where she was an honor roll student who enjoyed mathematics. Her teachers described her as a natural leader, who also was compassionate toward others. Breonna held a variety of jobs during high school, including work at a local Steak 'n Shake restaurant.

== Adult life ==
In 2011, Taylor attended the University of Kentucky (Lexington) and returned to Louisville in 2012. According to her mother, Tamika, Breonna turned her focus on working to improve her credit score and also buying a car and eventually a home. Taylor worked as an Emergency Medical Technician (EMT) from January to November 2016; by 2018, her certification had expired. In 2020, she was working as a PRN at Norton Hospital and as an Emergency Room Technician at UofL Health (Jewish Hospital) and was regarded as an essential worker during the COVID-19 pandemic. Taylor aspired to be a neonatal nurse, and planned to enroll at Ivy Tech Community College in Indiana in fall 2020.

== Death ==
On the evening of March 12, 2020, Taylor invited her aunt, 38-year-old Bianca Austin, out for drinks. Austin, a nursing student at the time, declined. Breonna and her boyfriend Kenneth "Kenny" Walker III stayed home and watched movies instead. After midnight, three plain clothes Louisville Metro police officers used a battering ram to enter Taylor's apartment in search of a suspect wanted for drug trafficking. They were investigating a man, Jamarcus Glover, who Taylor had previously dated. Taylor and Walker were in bed at the time. Believing that they were being robbed, Walker, a licensed gun owner, fired his gun at the officers, striking one of them, Sgt. Jonathan Mattingly, in the leg. The officers returned fire—32 shots total—striking Taylor several times, though she was unarmed. One of the bullets was fatal, and Taylor's body was found in the hallway. No drugs were ever found in the apartment.

The police say that they announced themselves prior to entering; Walker disputes their claim. Detectives Joshua Jaynes, Myles Cosgrove and Brett Hankison were all fired following an investigation. Hankison ultimately was charged by the state with "wanton endangerment" and was found not guilty. Although the family and local residents were outraged by the killing and the lack of formal charges for the officers, formal protests were limited due to restrictive shelter in place laws to reduce the impact of COVID-19. Further, few churches were available for funeral services due to those same restrictions.

Tamika Palmer and the Taylor family filed a wrongful death lawsuit and received a $12 million settlement in September 2020. In April 2021, Governor Andy Beshear signed Senate Bill 4, known as "Breonna's Law," which limits the "no knock" policy statewide. In August 2024, U.S. District Judge Charles Simpson dismissed felony charges against former officers Joshua Jaynes and Kyle Meany and declared that Taylor's death was a result of Walker's actions when the police officers entered the apartment. On March 27, 2026, Simpson dropped the remaining charges, with prejudice, at the request of the Trump Justice Department.

Following a series of short-term leaders at the helm of the LMPD during the aftermath of Taylor's death, Jacquelyn Gwinn-Villaroel was named the city's first permanent Black female police chief in July 2023. At the swearing-in ceremony, State Representative Keturah Herron remarked, "I cannot let this opportunity pass without mentioning Breonna Taylor. Her senseless death and the demands for justice that follow will create a movement whose impact will still be felt long after days and years." Gwinn-Villaroel is the fifth person to hold the position after former police chief Steve Conrad was fired in 2020.

Hankison would be convicted on federal civil rights charges involving unconstitutional use of excessive force in November 2025, and was then sentenced to 33 months in prison, which will then be followed by three years of supervised release, in July 2025.

== Legacy ==
=== Legislation ===
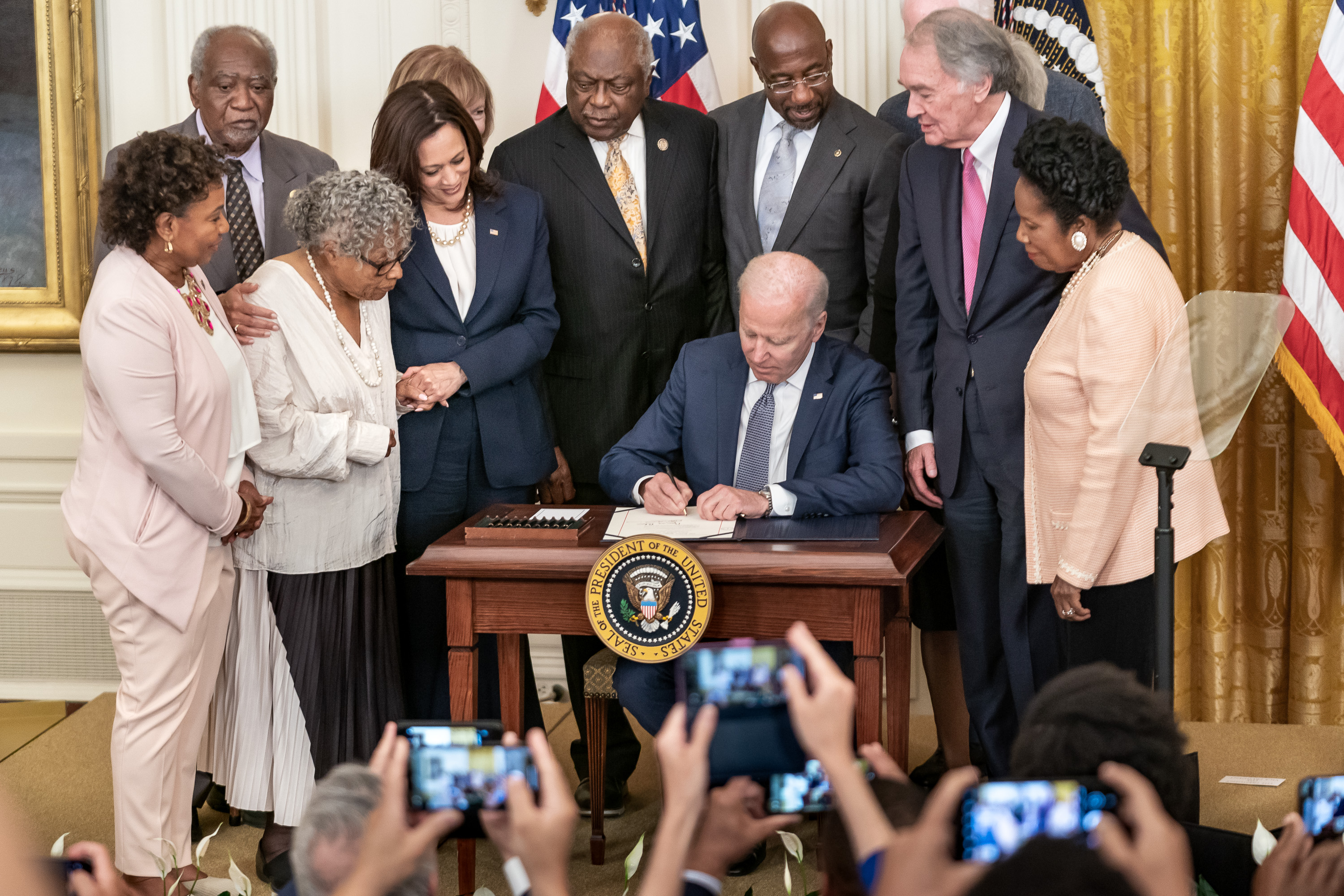
President Joe Biden signs bill making Juneteenth a federal holiday, 2021.

On June 11, 2020, the Louisville Metro Council banned no-knock search warrants; and by February 2022, other cities and states implemented similar restrictions. For instance, Oregon, Connecticut, Virginia and Florida all banned the policy within their respective borders. In March 2024, U.S. senator Rand Paul (R-KY) and Congressman Morgan McGarvey (D-KY) re-introduced a bill—the Justice for Breonna Taylor Act—prohibiting no-knock warrants on a national scale in response to Taylor's death.

The deaths of Taylor and George Floyd, in addition to social justice protests throughout the United States, prompted President Joe Biden to designate Juneteenth (June 19) a federal holiday.

=== Professional sports ===
In order to bring attention to social justice and the Black Lives Matter movement, the shortened and delayed 2020 WNBA season was dedicated to Taylor, as well as to other Black women either slain by police officers or whose deaths were as a result of over-policing, such as Sandra Bland. During the July season opener in New York City, players for the New York Liberty and Seattle Storm wore jerseys bearing Breonna Taylor's name on the back and then observed 26 seconds of silence—in recognition of Taylor's age. All players also left the court during the national anthem. Meanwhile, during the fall 2020 playoffs (during the abbreviated "bubble" season), NBA player Jamal Murray of the Denver Nuggets wore a custom-designed pair of Adidas sneakers featuring images of Taylor and George Floyd. "I use these shoes as a symbol to me to keep fighting. . . They give me a lot of power," Murray told reporters after scoring 50 points during a September game. And during the first round of the U.S. Open in New York City, tennis player Naomi Osaka wore a plain black face mask with Breonna Taylor's name on it. Musicians Chloe x Halle paid tribute to both Breonna Taylor and George Floyd during a pre-recorded performance of the national anthem to start the 2020–2021 NFL season. Chloe wore a T-shirt bearing Taylor's image (including the words "Say Her Name"), and the sisters raised their fists in the air at the conclusion. Also in September 2020, British racing driver Lewis Hamilton wore a t-shirt bearing Taylor's face on the back after he won the Formula 1 Tuscan Grand Prix. In 2024, Power of the Dream, a documentary directed by Dawn Porter was released; the film highlights the tensions that WNBA players faced while attempting to protest Taylor's death in 2020.

=== University of Kentucky ===
In summer 2020, a group of students at the University of Kentucky, including senior Khari Gardner from Baltimore, formed the Movement for Black Lives, a student organization. The group sent a list of demands to campus leadership including renaming a closed residence hall—the Kirwan-Blanding Residence Hall Complex and Dining Commons—after Breonna Taylor. In September 2020, Eli Capilouto, president of the University of Kentucky, charged the UK community to address "systemic racism." A month later, the University of Kentucky J. David Rosenberg College of Law hosted a day-long symposium about Breonna Taylor. The five panels featured a number of legal experts and attorneys, including Sam Aguiar and Lonita Baker, lawyers representing the Taylor family. In November 2020, the University of Kentucky College of Education hosted "Navigating Your Teens in Breonna Taylor's America", an online discussion aimed at youth leaders.

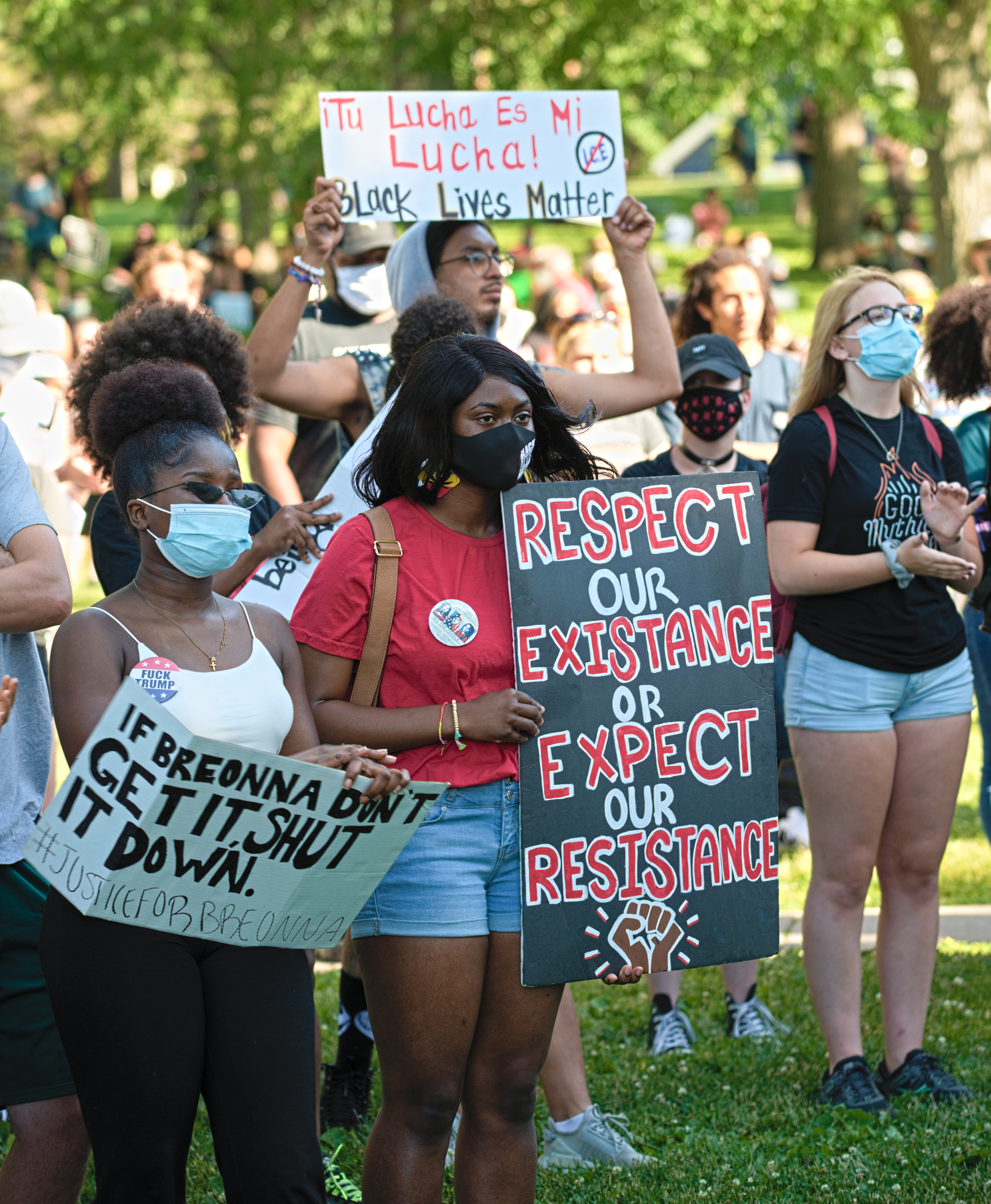
In summer 2020, college students nationally organized social justice protests following the death of Breonna Taylor.

=== Campus and school movements ===
In response to the deaths of Taylor and George Floyd, Black college students nationally organized protests and demanded better support on their campuses. Students at the University of California at Santa Barbara, for instance, demanded services and clinicians specifically for Black students; and in 2023, the campus partnered with the Santa Barbara Unified School District to open a physical space used to address racial trauma.

A group of eight female students from Waggener High School in Louisville formed the Future Ancestors dedicated to the memory of Taylor. Beginning in summer 2021, the women began hosting Race for Justice where individuals may participate in a 1.3 mile/walk (in recognition of the day that Breonna died) or teams may compete in a relay race for a total of 26 laps—each lap representing one year of Breonna's life. Proceeds are donated to social justice oriented non profits.

=== Scholarships ===
The University of Louisville, where Taylor worked as an ER technician at Medical Center East, established a nursing scholarship in her honor with funds received from a donor. Preference is given to Black women who are Kentucky residents. The University of Louisville Brandeis School of Law established The Breonna Taylor Legacy Fellowship for a current law student and in 2022 also established an annual lecture series, i.e., The Breonna Taylor Lecture on Structural Inequality.

In 2020, Jasmine Garrett Ellington, then a nursing student at Mercer University, established the Diversity in Nursing Scholarship in Taylor's honor. One year later, the Black Village Foundation, a non-profit based in the Chicago area, established several $1,000 Breonna Taylor EMT grants for local Black residents. Their goal is to diversify this healthcare field.

=== Murals and visual arts ===
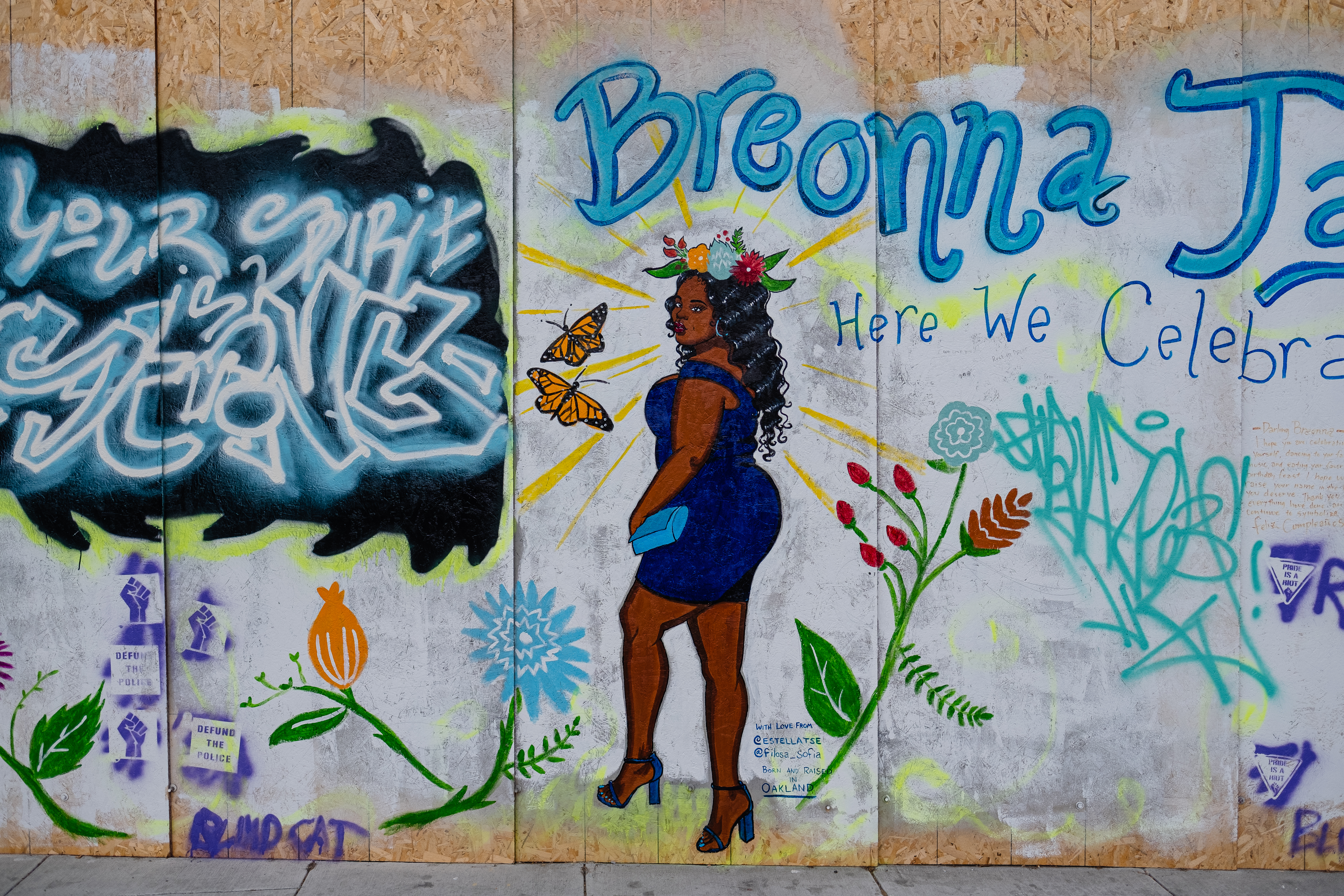
Starting in the summer of 2020, professional and amateur artists created murals all over the world, including this one in Oakland, California.

The summer following Taylor's death, a number of visual artists all over the world created murals in honor of Breonna, often including images of George Floyd and Ahmaud Arbery. These include a project led by O+, a community organization in Kingston, Jamaica.

Also in 2020, visual artist Amy Sherald was commissioned to create a portrait of Taylor for the September issue of Vanity Fair magazine. The following year, the piece was jointly purchased for one million dollars by the Smithsonian National Museum of African American History and Culture in Washington, D.C. and the Speed Art Museum in Louisville, Kentucky. Sherald, in turn, donated the proceeds to establish the Breonna Taylor Legacy Fellowships and the Breonna Taylor Legacy Scholarship awards at the University of Louisville to honor Taylor. First on public display at the Smithsonian, the piece moved to the Speed museum beginning June 2023, as per Sherald's request to have the work accessible to Louisville residents.

=== Musical tributes ===
A number of musicians also paid tribute to Breonna Taylor. Country singer Mickey Guyton co-wrote "Remember Her Name" (2021) and also dedicated her debut album of the same name in Taylor's memory. The song would be nominated for Best Country Song in 2022, making Guyton the first Black woman to compete in the category since 1994. Houston-based rapper Tobe Nwigwe says that he was inspired by God to create the 44 second tribute, "I Want You To (Breonna Taylor)", in 2020. The accompanying video received several hundred thousands of views on Instagram and TikTok.

=== Families United ===
Bianca Austin, Taylor's aunt, teamed up with Jacob Blake Sr. to establish a national organization, Families United for grieving families of police violence. Blake's son, Jacob Blake Jr. was shot seven times by a police officer in Kenosha, Wisconsin. The group's mission is to bring together grieving families.

=== Support for the formerly incarcerated ===
One of Taylor's sisters, De'Andrea, known as Dee Dee, founded Taylor-Made, a non-profit organization in Michigan, to support the formerly incarcerated of any gender.

== Personal ==
Known by family and friends as "Bre", "Breeway", and "Breezy", Taylor was born to Tamika Palmer and Everette Taylor. The pair had a casual relationship when Breonna was conceived and never married. She also was the eldest grandchild in the Palmer family.

Taylor's parents attended the same high school in Michigan. Tamika learned that she was pregnant with Breonna when she was 16 years old and raised her as a single parent. By age 19, Everette Taylor fathered six children (Breonna is his fourth) with other women. In 1998, he was sentenced to at least 45 years in prison for second-degree murder. Breonna was five years old at the time.

After completing high school, Palmer worked full-time as a nurse's aide caring for the elderly. In 2020, she worked as a dialysis technician. Taylor's maternal grandmother, Juanita Palmer, also worked as a nurse's aide, and her maternal grandfather worked for the Chrysler auto company in Grand Rapids, Michigan until retirement. Taylor's aunts also worked in healthcare.

Taylor met Kenneth Walker while she was in high school. Intending to propose to Breonna, Walker purchased an engagement ring, which his mother held for safekeeping.

At the time of her death in 2020, Taylor shared an apartment in south end Louisville with her sister, Ju'Niyah Palmer. Palmer, who was six years younger than Breonna, regarded her older sister as a "second mom". Breonna's other siblings fathered by Everette Taylor include: Asia, Ateaonia, De'Andrea ("Dee Dee"), Everette III, and Shantelle. (Ateaonia was born only two days after Breonna on June 7 in the same hospital.) Her sister Dee Dee is a graduate of Central Michigan University.

== See also ==
- Breonna Taylor protests
- Lists of killings by law enforcement officers in the United States
