= Charles Ralph Simpson III =

American judge (born 1945)

Senior Judge of the United States District Court for the Western District of Kentucky
- Incumbent
- Assumed office February 1, 2013

Chief Judge of the United States District Court for the Western District of Kentucky
- In office 1994–2001
- Preceded by: Ronald Edward Meredith
- Succeeded by: John G. Heyburn II

Judge of the United States District Court for the Western District of Kentucky
- In office August 4, 1986 – February 1, 2013
- Appointed by: Ronald Reagan
- Preceded by: Charles M. Allen
- Succeeded by: David J. Hale

Personal details
- Born: Charles Ralph Simpson III; July 8, 1945 (age 80) Cleveland, Ohio, U.S.
- Education: University of Louisville (BA, JD)

Charles Ralph Simpson III (born July 8, 1945) is a senior United States district judge of the United States District Court for the Western District of Kentucky.

== Education and career ==
Born in Cleveland, Ohio, Simpson received a Bachelor of Arts degree from the University of Louisville in 1967 and a Juris Doctor from the University of Louisville School of Law in 1970. He was in private practice in Louisville, Kentucky from 1971 to 1986. He was a part-time staff counsel, Jefferson County Judge/Executive from 1978 to 1984, and also a Jefferson County alcoholic beverage control administrator from 1983 to 1984. He was the city clerk of the City of Rolling Fields from 1985 to 1986.

=== Federal judicial service ===
On June 6, 1986, Simpson was nominated by President Ronald Reagan to a seat on the United States District Court for the Western District of Kentucky vacated by Judge Charles M. Allen. Simpson was confirmed by the United States Senate on August 1, 1986, and received his commission on August 4, 1986. He served as chief judge from 1994 to 2001. He assumed senior status on February 1, 2013.

=== Controversy ===
On August 23, 2024, Simpson made the controversial ruling to dismiss the most serious charge against former Louisville police officers in the fatal shooting of Breonna Taylor, blaming the officers' use of deadly force on Taylor's boyfriend shooting first during the forced entry she was killed in. The dismissed charge alleged that the officers deprived Taylor of her civil rights by subjecting the 26-year-old woman to an unreasonable firearm home raid with a warrant obtained on falsified grounds.

Taylor's death sparked widespread protests and calls for police reform, and the legal proceedings have been a focal point of intense public scrutiny.

== Sources ==
Legal offices
Preceded by Charles M. Allen	Judge of the United States District Court for the Western District of Kentucky; 1986–2013	Succeeded by David J. Hale
Preceded by Ronald Edward Meredith	Chief Judge of the United States District Court for the Western District of Kentucky; 1994–2001	Succeeded by John G. Heyburn II
