= List of University of Kentucky alumni =

This is a list of notable people associated with the University of Kentucky in the United States.

== Notable alumni (non-sports) ==
=== Academia and research ===
Name	Years attended/ degree received	Notability	Reference
Ronald Akers	PhD 1966	Professor emeritus of Criminology at the University of Florida	
Diogenes Allen	BA 1954	Professor of Philosophy at Princeton Theological Seminary; Rhodes Scholar	
W. David Arnett	BS 1961	Regents Professor of Astrophysics at the University of Arizona	
Robert A. Baker	BA 1948, MA 1949	Professor of Psychology at the University of Kentucky; UFO skeptic	
Albert Balows		Clinical microbiologist and president of the American Society for Microbiology	
William M. Bass	MS 1956	Professor of Forensic Anthropology at the University of Tennessee	
George Billman	PhD 1980	Professor of physiology at Ohio State University	
Charles E. Bishop	MS 1948	Chancellor of the University of Maryland, College Park, president of the University of Arkansas, chancellor of the University of Houston System	
Meir Bialer	post-doctoral studies 1979–80	David H. Eisenberg Professor of Pharmacy, Faculty of Medicine, The Hebrew University of Jerusalem, Israel	
Sarah Gibson Blanding	BA 1923	First female president of Vassar College	
Amy L. Bondurant	BA 1973	Former U.S. ambassador to the OECD	
M. Christopher Brown II	MS 1994	President of Alcorn State University and Kentucky State University	
Robert A. Bryan	MA 1951, PhD 1956	President of the University of Florida, University of Central Florida, and University of South Florida	
Francisco Xavier Castellanos	R 1991	Director of Research at the New York University Child Research Center	
Lois Mai Chan	PhD 1980	Professor of Library Science at the University of Kentucky	
Dale T. Chapman	BS	President of Lewis and Clark Community College	
Philip B. Coulter	1961–1962 (did not graduate)	Professor emeritus of Political Science and former dean at the University of New Orleans	
Matt Cutts	BS 1995	Software engineer	
Paul W. Davenport	PhD 1980	Professor of Physiology at the University of Florida	
Mark E. Davis	BS 1977, MS 1978, PhD 1981	Professor of Chemical Engineering at the California Institute of Technology	
Brady J. Deaton	BS 1966, MA 1968	Chancellor of the University of Missouri	
Peter Dendle	BA 1990, MA 1993	Professor of English at Penn State Mont Alto	
Robert Denhardt	PhD 1968	Professor of Public Policy at the University of Southern California	
Vijay K. Dhir	PhD 1972	Former dean of the University of California, Los Angeles Henry Samueli School of Engineering and Applied Science	
Joseph T. DiPiro	PharmD 1981	Dean of the Virginia Commonwealth University School of Pharmacy	
C. Kenneth Dodd Jr.	BS 1971	Herpetologist and conservationist	
Charles M. Dollar	MA 1963, PhD 1966	Electronic records program manager at the National Archives and Records Administration and professor at the University of British Columbia	
Herman Lee Donovan	BS 1914, LLD 1933	Former president of the University of Kentucky	
Michael Dorff	PhD 1997	Mathematician at Brigham Young University, president of the Mathematical Association of America, and founder of the Center for Undergraduate Research in Mathematics	
Ronald Enroth	MA 1963, PhD 1967	Professor of Sociology at Westmont College	
Esendugue Greg Fonsah	MS 1987	Agricultural economist	
Lori Stewart Gonzalez	B.A.	23rd president of Ohio University	
Virginia Griffing	BS, 1937	Physicist and chemist; first woman on the faculty of Catholic University of America's physics department	
Bradlee L. Heckmann	BS 2009	Neuroimmunologist and cell biologist	
Edward H. Kass	AB 1939; MS 1941	Physician, medical school professor, medical researcher in infectious diseases, medical journal editor, and historian of medicine	
A. D. Kirwan	AB 1926	Former president of the University of Kentucky	
William English Kirwan	AB 1960	Chancellor of the University System of Maryland	
John E. Leland	PhD 1994	Director of the University of Dayton Research Institute	
Helen Matthews Lewis	PhD 1970	Sociologist, historian, and activist	
William Lipscomb	BS 1941	1976 winner of the Nobel Prize in Chemistry	
Deanna B. Marcum	MLS 1971	President of the Council on Library and Information Resources and associate librarian at the Library of Congress	
Anne Hazen McFarland		Physician and medical journal editor	
Irving Millman		Virologist and microbiologist	
Thomas Hunt Morgan	BS 1886	Natural scientist and winner of the 1933 Nobel Prize in Physiology or Medicine	
Thomas Volney Munson	BS 1870, MS 1893, DSc 1906	Horticulturalist	
Lee T. Todd Jr.	BS 1968	Former president of the University of Kentucky; inventor; entrepreneur	
Nancy Tomes	BA 1974	Author and eminent historian of public health; recipient of the Bancroft Prize in 2017; Distinguished Professor, Stony Brook University	

=== Business ===
Name	Years attended/ degree received	Notability	Reference
Don Ball	Received honorary degrees in 2016	Founder of Ball Homes	
Wendell Cherry	BA 1957, LLB 1959	Founder of Humana	
Joe Craft	BS 1972, JD 1976	CEO of Alliance Resource Partners, a large coal producer; philanthropist	
Carol Martin "Bill" Gatton	BS 1954	Businessman and major contributor to the university; namesake of College of Business and Economics	
Rodney McMullen	BS 1981, MS 1982	CEO of The Kroger Company	
Sadiqa Reynolds	JD	CEO of the Perception Institute; former president and CEO of the Louisville Urban League	
Chris T. Sullivan	BS 1972	Founder of Outback Steakhouse	
Paul C. Varga	Bachelor of Business Admin	Former chief executive officer and chairman of Brown–Forman	

=== Entertainment ===
Name	Years attended/ degree received	Notability	Reference
Adunni Ade	BS 2008	Actress and model	
Sara Bradley		Chef	
Ramsey Carpenter	BA 2013	Miss Kentucky 2014	
Leticia Cline	BS 2000	Model	
Wes Cowan	MA	Auctioneer and appraiser for Antiques Roadshow and History Detectives	
Joseph David-Jones	(did not graduate)	Actor	
Clark Janell Davis	BA 2018	Miss Kentucky 2015	
Jenna Day	BA 2014	Miss Kentucky 2013	
Jimmy Dunne	BA 1977	Songwriter, recording artist, composer, film and television producer, and entrepreneur	
Chris Easterly	BA 1998	Screenwriter	
Miss Elizabeth	BA	WWF and WCW professional wrestling manager, wife of Randy Savage	
Richard Bunger Evans	(did not graduate)	Composer and pianist	
Lyndsey Gough	2015	On-air TV sports anchor	
Ashley Judd	BA 2007	Actress; celebrity fan of the Wildcats (men's) basketball team	
Glenn Kotche	BM 1994	Percussionist and composer, best known as drummer for Chicago rock band Wilco; named the 41st greatest drummer of all time by Gigwise in 2008	
Jean Ritchie	AB 1946	Folk musician, singer, and songwriter who plays the Appalachian dulcimer	
Reshma Shetty	MM, 2003	Singer, actress, Royal Pains	
Harry Dean Stanton		Actor known for playing Roman Grant on Big Love	
Jiaoying Summers	BS 2012	Stand-up comedian and actress	
Kristine Sutherland		Actress, Buffy the Vampire Slayer, Honey, I Shrunk the Kids	
Rudy Vaughn	BM 2003	Musician, singer-songwriter	
Sullivan Canaday White	BA 1988	Theater producer, director, and educator	

=== Government, law, and public policy ===
Note: Individuals who belong in multiple sections appear in the first relevant section.

==== Governors ====
Name	Years attended/ degree received	Notability	Reference
J. C. W. Beckham	1889	Former governor of Kentucky	
Steve Beshear	BA 1966, JD 1968	Former governor of Kentucky	
Ned Breathitt	BS 1948, LLB 1950	Former governor of Kentucky	
John Y. Brown Jr.	BA 1957, LLB 1960	Former governor of Kentucky	
Julian Carroll	BA 1954, LLB 1956	Former governor of Kentucky	
Albert B. "Happy" Chandler	LLB 1924, LLD 1936	Governor of Kentucky, U.S. senator from Kentucky, commissioner of Major League Baseball responsible for integration and was inducted in the Baseball Hall of Fame	
Earle Clements	AB 1917	Former governor of Kentucky	
Martha Layne Collins	BS 1959	Former governor of Kentucky	
Bert Combs	LLB 1937	Former governor of Kentucky, former judge for the United States Court of Appeals for the Sixth Circuit	
Milton C. Elstner	BA 1872; JD ?	Three-time United States attorney for the Western District of Louisiana under five presidents	
William J. Fields		Former governor of Kentucky, former representative from Kentucky's 9th congressional district	
Ernie Fletcher	BS 1974, MD 1984	Former governor of Kentucky, former representative from Kentucky's 6th congressional district	
Wendell Ford	1942–1943 (did not graduate)	Former governor of Kentucky, former senator from Kentucky	
Keen Johnson	BA 1922	Former governor of Kentucky	
Paul E. Patton	BS 1959	Two-term governor of Kentucky	
Beverly Perdue	BA 1969	Former governor of North Carolina	
James G. Scrugham	BME 1900, ME 1906	Former governor of Nevada, former senator from Nevada, former representative from Nevada's at-large congressional district	
Augustus Owsley Stanley	1886–1888 (did not graduate)	Former governor of Kentucky, former senator from Kentucky, former representative from Kentucky's 2nd congressional district	
Ted Strickland	MA 1966, PhD 1980	Former governor of Ohio	
Tom Jefferson Terral	1905–1906 (did not graduate)	Governor of Arkansas, 1925–1927	
Wallace Wilkinson	1960–1962 (did not graduate)	Former governor of Kentucky	

==== Members of the US Congress ====
Name	Years attended/ degree received	Notability	Reference
Scotty Baesler	BS 1963, JD 1966	Former U.S. representative from Kentucky	
Andy Barr	JD 2001	United States representative from Kentucky's 6th congressional district	
Jim Baird	PHD 1975	United States representative from Indiana's 4th congressional district	
John B. Breckinridge	AB 1937, LLB 1939	Former representative from Kentucky's 6th congressional district	
John Y. Brown Sr.	LLB 1926	Former representative from Kentucky's At-large congressional district	
Albert B. "Ben" Chandler	BA 1983, JD 1986	Former U.S. representative from Kentucky's 6th congressional district	
Virgil Chapman	1918	Former Senator from Kentucky, former representative from Kentucky's 6th congressional district	
David Grant Colson	1879–1880 (did not graduate)	Former representative from Kentucky's 11th congressional district	
William P. Curlin Jr.	AB 1958, LLB 1962	Former representative from Kentucky's 6th congressional district	
Leonard S. Echols	1894	Former U.S. representative from West Virginia's 5th congressional district	
Walter Dee Huddleston	BA 1949	Former Senator from Kentucky	
Ron Lewis	BA 1969	Former U.S. representative from Kentucky's 2nd congressional district	
Ken Lucas	BS 1955	Former U.S. representative from Kentucky's 4th congressional district	
Mitch McConnell	JD 1967	U.S. senator from Kentucky, current Senate minority leader	
Morgan McGarvey	JD	United States representative from Kentucky's 3rd congressional district	
Hal Rogers	AB 1962, LLB 1964	United States representative from Kentucky's 5th congressional district	
Eugene Siler	1922	Former representative from Kentucky's 8th and 5th congressional districts	
Louise Slaughter	BS 1951, MS 1953	Former United States representative from New York's 25th congressional district	
Marcus A. Smith	1876	Former senator from Arizona	
William A. Stanfill	LLB 1912	Former senator from Kentucky	
Frank Stubblefield	BS 1932	Former representative from Kentucky's 1st congressional district	
King Swope	1916	Former representative from Kentucky's 8th congressional district	
Thomas R. Underwood	1917	Former senator from Kentucky, former representative from Kentucky's 6th congressional district	
Beverly M. Vincent		Former representative from Kentucky's 2nd congressional district	
John C. Watts	AB 1925, LLB 1927	Former representative from Kentucky's 6th congressional district	
John D. White		Former representative from Kentucky's 10th congressional district	
Ed Whitfield	BS 1965, JD 1969	Former U.S. representative from Kentucky's 1st congressional district	

==== US federal and state judges ====
Name	Years attended/ degree received	Notability	Reference
Thomas A. Ballantine Jr.	BA 1948	District judge for the Western District of Kentucky	
David Bunning	BA 1988, JD 1991	District judge for the Eastern District of Kentucky	
Karen K. Caldwell	JD 1980	Chief judge for the Eastern District of Kentucky	
Jennifer B. Coffman	BA 1969, MS 1971, JD 1978	Chief judge for the Eastern District of Kentucky and district judge for the Western District of Kentucky	
Bill Cunningham	JD 1969	Former justice of the Kentucky Supreme Court	
Charles I. Dawson	(did not graduate)	District judge for the Western District of Kentucky	
Karl Spillman Forester	BA 1962, JD 1966	District judge for the Eastern District of Kentucky	
William Gant	LLB 1946	Former justice of the Kentucky Supreme Court	
Joseph Robert Goeke	JD 1975	Senior judge for the United States Tax Court	
James Fleming Gordon	LLB 1941	District judge for the Western District of Kentucky	
Harlan Hobart Grooms	LLB 1926	District judge for the Northern District of Alabama	
David J. Hale	JD 1992	District judge for the Western District of Kentucky	
John G. Heyburn II	JD 1976	District judge for the Western District of Kentucky	
Joseph Martin Hood	BS 1965, JD 1972	District judge for the Eastern District of Kentucky	
Edward Huggins Johnstone	JD 1949	District judge for the Western District of Kentucky	
Joseph H. McKinley Jr.	BS 1976	District judge for the Western District of Kentucky	
John E. Miller	LLB 1912	District judge for the Western District of Arkansas	
Bernard Thomas Moynahan Jr.	AB 1935, LLB 1938	Former district judge for the Eastern District of Kentucky	
Scott Elgin Reed	LLB 1945	District judge for the Eastern District of Kentucky	
Samuel Murray Rosenstein	AB 1928	Judge for the Customs Court and the Court of International Trade	
Thomas B. Russell	JD 1970	District judge for the Western District of Kentucky	
Gregory N. Stivers	LLB 1912	District judge for the Western District of Kentucky	
Gregory F. Van Tatenhove	JD 1989	District judge for the Eastern District of Kentucky	
Henry Rupert Wilhoit Jr.	LLB 1960	District judge for the Eastern District of Kentucky	
J. Craig Wright	BA 1951	Former justice of the Ohio Supreme Court	

==== Other US political and legal figures ====
Name	Years attended/ degree received	Notability	Reference
Bob Babbage	MA 1988	Former secretary of state of Kentucky	
Allison Ball	JD 2008	Kentucky state treasurer	
Danny Bentley	BS PharmD	Member of the Kentucky House of Representatives	
Robert Benvenuti	BS 1988, MPA 1991, JD 1998	Member of the Kentucky House of Representatives	
Karen Berg		Physician, professor, and member of the Kentucky State Senate	
Richard Briggs	MD 1978	Tennessee state senator	
John Young Brown III	JD 1992	Former secretary of state of Kentucky	
Nick Casey	BS 1974	Former chairman of the West Virginia Democratic Party	
Russell Coleman	BA 1998, JD 2004	United States attorney for the Western District of Kentucky	
Oscar M. Corbin Jr.	BS 1940	Former mayor of Fort Myers, Florida	
Will Coursey	BA	Member of the Kentucky House of Representatives	
Kelly Knight Craft (née Guilfoil)	BA 1984	U.S. ambassador to the United Nations and U.S. ambassador to Canada	
Jesse Crenshaw	JD 1974	Former member of the Kentucky House of Representatives	
Robert Damron	BA, MBA	Member of the Kentucky House of Representatives	
James J. Davidson	1883	US representative-elect, died before taking the oath	
Mike Denham	1972	Former member of the Kentucky House of Representatives	
Bob DeWeese	BS 1957	Former member of the Kentucky House of Representatives	
James C. Duff	BA 1975	Director of the Administrative Office of the United States Courts	
Mike Duncan	JD 1974	Former chairman of the Republican National Committee and current governor of the US Postal Service	
Robert M. Duncan Jr.	JD 2003	United States attorney for the Eastern District of Kentucky	
Adam Edelen		Auditor of Public Accounts for Kentucky	
A. M. Edwards	JD 1929	Secretary of Guam	
Christine A. Elder	BA 1989	US ambassador to Liberia	
C. B. Embry	(did not graduate)	Member of the Kentucky State Senate	
Gatewood Galbraith	BA 1974, JD 1977	Activist and five-time candidate for governor of Kentucky	
Kerry B. Harvey	JD 1982	Former United States attorney for the Eastern District of Kentucky	
Jerry Lundergan	1969	Member of the Kentucky House of Representatives, chairman of the Kentucky Democratic Party	
Russ Mobley	BA, MA	Former state representative from Taylor and Adair counties	
Daniel Mongiardo	MD 1986	Former lieutenant governor of Kentucky	
Steve Pence	JD 1981	Former lieutenant governor of Kentucky	
Timothy N. Philpot	BS 1974, JD 1977	Two-term state senator of Kentucky (1991–98), family court circuit judge (2004–present)	
Mary Martha Presley Merritt	BA	Two-term member of the West Virginia House of Delegates, president of the West Virginia Board of Education, and West Virginia Worker's Compensation commissioner	
Mary Ann Tobin	BS 1963	Four-term member of the Kentucky House of Representatives (1976–84), Kentucky Auditor of Public Accounts (1984–88)	
Max Wise	MA 1999	FBI agent, member of the Kentucky Senate	
Joe Wright	BS 1962	Kentucky state senator (1976–92); party floor leader (1981–92); 1996 party nominee for U.S. Congress; businessman	
Debbie Warner	BS	Member of the West Virginia House of Delegates	
Whitney Westerfield		Politician	

=== Journalism and literature ===
Name	Years attended/ degree received	Notability	Reference
Raymond Abbott	1967–1968 (did not graduate)	Whiting Award-winning novelist	
Sam Abell	BA 1969	National Geographic photographer	
Wendell Berry	BA 1956, MA 1957	Poet, essayist and farmer	
Maxine Cheshire	1949–1950 (did not graduate)	Reporter for The Washington Post	
Elizabeth Gould Davis	MA 1951	Author of The First Sex	
Charles Dickinson	BA 1973	Author	
Michael Eaves	BA 1994	Sportscaster	
Tom Hammond	BS 1967	Sportscaster	
Elizabeth Hardwick	AB 1938, MA 1939	Writer	
David Winfield Huddleston	BA 1971	Christian author and minister	
Kim Yong-ik	MA 1953	Author	
Elizabeth Madox Roberts	1900 (did not graduate)	Poet and novelist	
Don Rosa	BS 1973	Eisner Award-winning writer and artist of Donald Duck and Uncle Scrooge comic books	
Charles Sallis	PhD 1967	Historian and writer	
Anne Shelby	MA 1981	Children's book writer	
Michael M. York	BA 1974	Pulitzer Prize for Investigative Reporting	

=== Military ===
Name	Years attended/ degree received	Notability	Reference
William VanMeter Alford Jr.	BA, JD	Chief of fstaff for the United States Pacific Command	
John A. Dabney	BA 1926	Lieutenant general, United States Army	
Hugh M. Milton II	BS 1919, MS 1922	United States under secretary of the Army, 1958–1961	
Elvis Jacob Stahr Jr.	AB 1936	Secretary of the Army under President John F. Kennedy, president of Indiana University and West Virginia University, and president of The National Audubon Society	

=== Miscellaneous ===
Name	Years attended/ degree received	Notability	Reference
Ace	2015	Professional gamer	
Terry Adkins	MFA 1979	Interdisciplinary artist and musician	
Joyce Hamilton Berry	MA 1967, PhD 1970	Clinical psychologist	
Madeline McDowell Breckinridge	1890–1894 (did not graduate)	Leader of the women's suffrage movement	
Stephen Bright	BA 1971, JD 1974	President of the Southern Center for Human Rights	
David Horace Clift	BS 1930	President of the American Library Association	
P. J. Conkwright	BA 1928	Graphic designer and typographer	
Brenda Cowan	1986	Lexington's first black female firefighter; died in the line of duty	
G. Lindsey Davis	MS 1972	Methodist bishop	
Mary Desha	(did not graduate)	Founder of the Daughters of the American Revolution	
Edward A. Eckenhoff	MA 1968	Founder and president of the National Rehabilitation Hospital in Washington, D.C.	
Pam Elam	BA 1972, JD 1975	Feminist activist	
Mark P. Finlay	B.Arch 1977	Architect	
Belinda Mason	BA 1980	AIDS activist and member of the U.S. National Commission on AIDS	
Story Musgrave	MS 1966	Astronaut	
Henderson Ryan	1877	Architect	
John T. Scopes	BA 1924	Defendant in the Scopes Trial	
Yang Sung-chul	PhD 1970	Political scientist, South Korean ambassador to the United States (2000–2003)	

== Sports alumni ==
=== Basketball ===
Name	Years attended	Notable for
Derek Anderson	1994–1997 (Note: Did not play until 1995)	Former NBA player (2005–06 NBA champion)
Kelenna Azubuike	2002–2005	Former NBA Golden State Warriors player
Bam Adebayo	2016–2017	14th pick in the 2017 NBA draft, NBA player for the Miami Heat
Eric Bledsoe	2009–2010	One of five first-round picks from UK in the 2010 NBA draft and current player for the Portland Trail Blazers
Keith Bogans	1999–2003	Former NBA player
Devin Booker	2014–2015	Currently NBA player for the Phoenix Suns 2015-present, all-time leading scorer
Sam Bowie	1979–1984 (Note: Did not play in the 1981–82 or 1982–83 seasons due to injury)	2nd pick in 1984 NBA draft (ahead of Michael Jordan)
Isaiah Briscoe	2015–2017	Former NBA player
Ramel Bradley	2004–2008	Playing for Hapoel Holon in the Israeli Super League
Dwane Casey		Former Minnesota Timberwolves; current head coach for the Detroit Pistons
Rex Chapman	1986–1988	Former NBA player and first-ever draft choice in Charlotte Hornets franchise history
Bill Cofield	MS 1967	Basketball coach for the Wisconsin Badgers men's basketball team
DeMarcus Cousins	2009–2010	One of five first-round picks from UK in the 2010 NBA draft
Joe Crawford	2004–2008	Former NBA New York Knicks player; 2nd round draft; 58th pick overall in the 2008 NBA draft by the Los Angeles Lakers
Louis Dampier	1965–1967	Played for the Kentucky Colonels of the ABA and the San Antonio Spurs in the NBA; scored the most points in ABA history
Erik Daniels	2000–2004	NBDL Fayetteville Patriots player
Anthony Davis	2011–2012	Consensus men's college player of the year in 2011–12; now in the NBA with the Washington Wizards
Tony Delk	1992–1996	Former NBA player
Victoria Dunlap	2007–2011	WNBA player with the Washington Mystics
Fabulous Five	N/A	1948 Olympic basketball gold medalists
Richie Farmer	1988–1992	Never played professional basketball; former Kentucky commissioner of agriculture, 2003–2011; spent two years in federal prison for crimes committed while commissioner of agriculture
Gerald Fitch	2000–2004	TBL Galatasaray Cafe Crown player
Travis Ford	1990–1994 (Note: Did not play until 1991, as he had to sit out the 1990–91 season after transferring from Missouri)	Oklahoma State University men's basketball head coach
De'Aaron Fox	2016–2017	5th overall pick in the 2017 NBA draft, NBA player for the San Antonio Spurs
Wenyen Gabriel	2016–2018	South Sudanese-American basketball player for Maccabi Tel Aviv of the Israeli Basketball Premier League
Shai Gilgeous-Alexander	2017–2018	NBA player for the Oklahoma City Thunder, 2025 NBA champion, 2025 NBA Finals MVP, 2025 NBA Most Valuable Player, 2025 NBA scoring champion
Jack Givens	1974–1978	1978 NCAA basketball tournament Most Outstanding Player
Kevin Grevey	1972–1975	Former NBA player
Josh Harrellson	2008–2011	Former NBA player
Chuck Hayes	2001–2005	Former NBA player
Tyler Herro	2018–2019	13th pick in the 2019 NBA draft, NBA player for the Miami Heat
Dan Issel	1966–1970	All-time leading men's scorer and former Denver Nuggets head coach
Terrence Jones	2010–2012	Former NBA player
Enes Kanter Freedom	2010–2011 (Note: Although Kanter enrolled at Kentucky, he never played because he was declared ineligible by the NCAA due to financial benefits he had received from his former Turkish club team of Fenerbahçe Ülker.)	3rd pick in the 2011 NBA draft and current player for the Boston Celtics
Michael Kidd-Gilchrist	2011–2012	2nd pick in the 2012 NBA draft
Brandon Knight	2010–2011	8th pick in the 2011 NBA draft and current player for the Perth Wildcats
Doron Lamb	2010–2012	Former NBA player
James Lee	1975–1978	Second round draft pick and former CBA player
Trey Lyles	2014–2015	NBA player for the Sacramento Kings
Skal Labissière	2015–2016	Former NBA player
Kyle Macy	1976–1979 (Note: Did not play until 1977, as he had to sit out the 1976–77 season after transferring from Purdue)	Former Morehead State University men's basketball head coach
Jamaal Magloire	1996–2000	Former NBA player
Jamal Mashburn	1990–1993	Former NBA All-Star; current ESPN basketball analyst
Steve Masiello	1996–2000	Current associate head coach at Manhattan College
Walter McCarty	1992–1996 (Note: Did not play in the 1992–93 season for academic reasons)	Former NBA player; current assistant coach at the University of Louisville
Stacy McIntyre	1988–1992	College basketball coach, Air Force Falcons women's basketball head coach (2024–present)
Ron Mercer	1995–1997	Current NBA free agent who has played with seven different teams
Malik Monk	2016–2017	11th overall pick in the 2017 NBA draft, NBA player for the Sacramento Kings
Darius Miller	2008–2012	Former NBA player; currently playing in Germany with Brose Baskets
Dirk Minniefield	1979–1983	Former NBA player
Nazr Mohammed	1995–1998	Former NBA player; member of the 2004–05 NBA champion San Antonio Spurs
Randolph Morris	2004–2007	Former NBA player
Jamal Murray	2015–2016	7th pick in the 2016 NBA draft for the Denver Nuggets, holds the record for most consecutive games with a three pointer
Cotton Nash	1961–1964	Former NBA player and MLB outfielder
Nerlens Noel	2012–2013	6th pick in the 2013 NBA draft
Bernard Opper	1936–1939	All-American basketball player for the Wildcats and professional player
Daniel Orton	2009–2010	One of five first-round picks from UK in the 2010 NBA draft
Scott Padgett	1994–1999 (Note: Did not play in 1995–96 or the first half of the 1996–97 season for academic reasons)	Former NBA and ACB player; current head coach at Samford University
Patrick Patterson	2007–2010	One of five first-round picks from UK in the 2010 NBA draft
John Pelphrey	1988–1992	Current assistant at the University of Florida; former head coach at the University of Arkansas
Mike Phillips	1975–1978	Third round draft pick and former Liga ACB player
Mark Pope	1993–1996 (Note: Did not play until 1994, as he had to sit out the 1993–94 season after transferring from Washington)	Former NBA player; current head coach at the University of Kentucky
Alex Poythress	2012–2016	American-Ivorian basketball player for Maccabi Tel Aviv of the Israeli Premier Basketball League, former NBA player
Tayshaun Prince	1998–2002	Former NBA player; member of the 2003–04 NBA champion Detroit Pistons
Frank Ramsey	1950–1954	Seven-time NBA champion
Julius Randle	2013–2014	NBA player for the Brooklyn Nets
Pat Riley	1963–1967	NBA Miami Heat former coach, and current team president; coached the 2005–06 NBA champion Miami Heat
Rick Robey	1975–1978	Third overall draft pick in 1978; played with the Indiana Pacers, Boston Celtics, and Phoenix Suns; member of the Celtics' 1981 NBA Championship team
Rajon Rondo	2004–2006	Former NBA Cleveland Cavaliers player; member of the 2007–08 NBA champion Boston Celtics and 2019–20 NBA champion Los Angeles Lakers
Nate Sestina		Israeli Basketball Premier League player
Jeff Sheppard	1993–1998 (Note: Did not play in the 1996–97 season due to injury)	1998 NCAA basketball tournament Most Outstanding Player
Valerie Still	1979–1983	Leading scorer in UK basketball history, male or female; played professionally in Europe and the ABL before briefly playing for the Washington Mystics in the WNBA; younger sister of UK football great Art Still
Marquis Teague	2011–2012	Former NBA player
Jacob Toppin	2020–2023	Current player for Hapoel Tel Aviv of the Israeli Basketball Premier League; former NBA player
Karl-Anthony Towns	2014–2015	1st pick of the 2015 NBA draft; current player for the New York Knicks
Wayne Turner	1995–1999	Former ANBL New Zealand Breakers player; ended his UK career as the all-time NCAA leader in games played (record since surpassed)
Tyler Ulis	2014–2016	Former NBA player
Frank Vogel	BS 1998	Former head coach for the Los Angeles Lakers
Antoine Walker	1994–1996	Former NBA player; member of the 2005–06 NBA champion Miami Heat
Kenny Walker	1982–1986	1985–1986 All-American and 5th pick in the 1986 NBA draft
John Wall	2009–2010	1st pick of the 2010 NBA draft; former player for the Houston Rockets
Bobby Watson		Former NBA player
Derek Willis	2013–2017	Former NBA player
Sean Woods	1988–1992	Former head coach at Morehead State University
James Young		NBA player; 2019–2020 top scorer in the Israel Basketball Premier League

==== Notes ====
- For players who enrolled from 1954 through 1971, their actual playing career did not start until a year after they first attended. At that time, freshmen were ineligible to play at varsity level.
- Willie Cauley-Stein (born 1993), NBA basketball player
- Sacha Killeya-Jones (born 1998), American-British basketball player for Hapoel Gilboa Galil of the Israeli Basketball Premier League

=== Football ===
Name	Years attended	Notable for
Derek Abney		NFL, former Chicago Bears wide receiver
George Blanda		American Football League MVP, 1961, two-time AFL champ, and member of the Pro Football Hall of Fame
Shane Boyd		Former Arizona Cardinals quarterback
Chuck Bradley		Gridiron football offensive tackle
Neal Brown		Former offensive coordinator at Troy University, Texas Tech, and UK; current head coach at Troy
Vincent "Sweet Pea" Burns		Former NFL Indianapolis Colts defensive end
Jerry Claiborne	1946–1950	Former head football coach
Randall Cobb	2008–2011 (Note: Left full-time study for the NFL in 2011; received degree in 2016.)	Current wide receiver and return specialist with the Green Bay Packers; first person born in the 1990s to play in the NFL
Tim Couch	1996–1999	Former Cleveland Browns and Jacksonville Jaguars quarterback
Jamin Davis	2017–2020	Linebacker; drafted in the first round of the 2021 NFL draft by the Washington Football Team
Dermontti Dawson		Former NFL offensive lineman for the Pittsburgh Steelers; inducted into the Pro Football Hall of Fame in 2012
David De La Peralle		Former CFL offensive lineman
Mark Higgs		Former NFL running back
Josh Hines-Allen	2015–2018	Current outside linebacker for the Jacksonville Jaguars
Glenn Holt		NFL Cincinnati Bengals wide receiver
Christian Johnson		Arena Football League player
Cory "Poop" Johnson	2014–2016	Former NFL and current CFL defensive lineman
Dennis Johnson		Former San Francisco 49ers defensive end; currently with the Lexington Horsemen
Don King		Former NFL defensive tackle
Kelly Kirchbaum		Professional football player
Jared Lorenzen		Former New York Giants quarterback
Ricky Lumpkin		NFL player
Tim Masthay		Former punter for the Green Bay Packers; Super Bowl XLV Champion
Marlon McCree		Former San Diego Chargers, current Denver Broncos safety
Rick Nuzum		Former NFL center
Babe Parilli		Three-time American Football League all-star and 1968 Super Bowl champ
Joker Phillips	1981–1985	Former wide receiver for the Washington Redskins and the CFL's Toronto Argonauts; former UK head coach
Artose Pinner		Former Minnesota Vikings running back
Derrick Ramsey	1974–1978	Former tight end for three NFL teams; athletic director at Coppin State University, 2008–2015; Kentucky secretary of labor, 2015–present
Dewayne Robertson		Former New York Jets, former Denver Broncos defensive tackle
Howard Schnellenberger		Retired football coach, most recently with Florida Atlantic; former head coach of the NFL's Baltimore Colts, and of Miami, Louisville, and Oklahoma in the college ranks
Art Still		Former Kansas City Chiefs player and 4-time Pro Bowler; older brother of Valerie Still (see basketball alumni)
Jeff Van Note		Former Atlanta Falcons offensive lineman and 6-time Pro Bowler
Moe Williams		Former Minnesota Vikings running back
Ken Willis		Former Dallas Cowboys kicker
Earl Wilson		NFL and CFL player
Craig Yeast	1995–1998	Former Cincinnati Bengals receiver

=== Baseball ===
Name	Years attended	Notable for
Bill Black	BA 1942	Player-coach for the Wildcats
Joe Blanton		Former Major League Baseball pitcher; member of the 2008 World Series Champion Philadelphia Phillies, winner of Game 4 of the 2008 World Series
Derek Bryant	1971–1973	Outfielder for the Oakland Athletics
Collin Cowgill		Former Major League Baseball outfielder, 2011–2016
Greg Gibson		Major League Baseball umpire
Trevor Gott	2011–2013	Pitcher for the Seattle Mariners, and formerly the Los Angeles Angels, Washington Nationals, San Francisco Giants, and Milwaukee Brewers
Andy Green		Former Major League Baseball player with the New York Mets and Arizona Diamondbacks, and manager of the San Diego Padres
Jason Kipnis		Second baseman for the Cleveland Indians and the Chicago Cubs
Jim Leyritz		Former Major League Baseball player, most notably for the New York Yankees
Luke Maile		Catcher for the Milwaukee Brewers, and formerly the Tampa Bay Rays and Toronto Blue Jays
Randy Marsh		Former Major League Baseball umpire
A. J. Reed	2011–2014	Minor League Baseball player in the Houston Astros organization; consensus NCAA Division I player of the year in 2014
Mark Thompson		Former Major League Baseball pitcher
Brandon Webb		Former Major League Baseball pitcher, 2006 National League Cy Young Award winner

=== Soccer ===
Name	Years attended	Notable for
Michael D'Agostino	2005	Former Canadian soccer midfielder for Whitecaps FC Reserves, Blackpool, and Cheltenham Town; current assistant coach of Vancouver Whitecaps
George Davis IV	2007–2009	Former USL Championship soccer player
Kalil ElMedkhar	2017–2020	Current professional soccer player
Enrique Facussé	2017–2021	Current Honduran professional soccer goalkeeper
Kaelon Fox	2013–2016	Former professional soccer player
Andy Gruenebaum	2001–2005	Former Major League Soccer goalkeeper; 2008 MLS Cup winner with Columbus Crew
Clay Holstad	2018–2022	43rd pick in 2023 MLS SuperDraft; current professional soccer midfielder
Kelli Hubly	2012–2014	NWSL defender since 2017; currently with Portland Thorns FC
Callum Irving	2012–2015	Current Canadian soccer goalkeeper
Leon Jones	2017–2021	Current soccer defender for Hong Kong national team
Aimé Mabika	2016–2020	26th pick in 2021 MLS SuperDraft; currently a defender in United Soccer League Championship
Napo Matsoso	2013–2016	31st pick in 2017 MLS SuperDraft; current professional soccer midfielder
Josh Mulvany	2010–2011	Former English soccer midfielder
Charley Pettys	2010–2012	Former professional soccer player
Barry Rice	2006–2009	Former Major League Soccer defender
JJ Williams	2016–2018	18th pick in 2019 MLS SuperDraft; currently a striker in United Soccer League Championship
Jansen Wilson	2019–2021	Current professional soccer player

=== Other ===
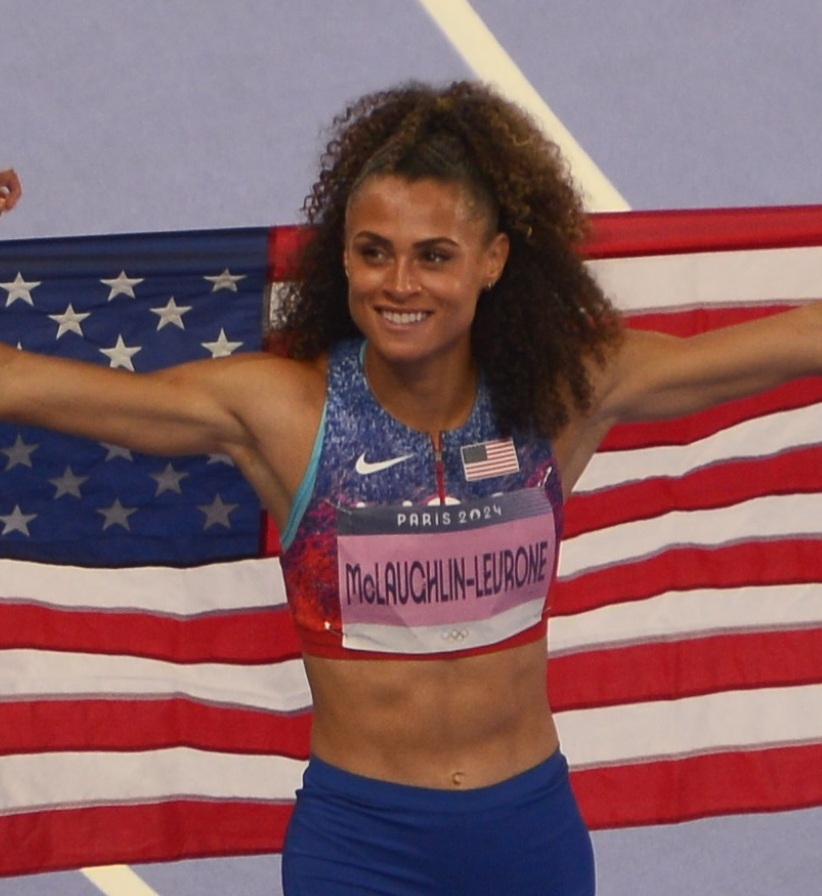
Sydney McLaughlin-Levrone

- Simidele Adeagbo, Olympic athlete
- J. Elliott Burch, horse trainer
- Russ Cochran, golfer on the PGA Champions Tour
- Steve Flesch, golfer on the PGA Tour
- Larry Glover, sports radio announcer
- Jenny Hansen, 13-time All-American gymnast
- Whitney Agee Hollman, cheerleader, 4-time UCA champion and gold medalist at the ICU World Championships
- J. B. Holmes, golfer on the PGA Tour
- Andy Jackson, former tennis coach for Mississippi State and the University of Florida
- Sydney McLaughlin-Levrone, Olympic gold medalist
- Chase Parker, golfer
- Jacob Thomson, U.S. Champion distance runner
- Mary Tucker, Olympic sports shooter, world champion in 10 meter air rifle

== Notable faculty ==
Name	Joined	Left/retired	Position	Reference
Robert A. Baker	1969	1988	Professor emeritus of Psychology	
Mark Berger	1981	2003	Director of the Center for Business and Economic Research and William B. Sturgill Professor of Economics	
Lois Mai Chan	1970	2011	Professor of Library Sciences	
John Sherman Cooper	1935	1946	Member of the board of trustees	
Guy Davenport	1963	1990	Professor of English	
Lewis L. Walker	1908	1915	Member of the board of trustees	
Benjamin Warf	1992	2000	Chief of Pediatric Neurosurgery; director of Surgical Education	
