= List of Transylvania University alumni =

This list of Transylvania University alumni includes alumni who are graduates or were non-matriculating students of Transylvania University.

== Politics ==
=== Cabinet members ===
- William T. Barry, United States Postmaster General
- John C. Breckinridge, Vice President of the United States, graduated 1841
- Jefferson Davis, Secretary of War, also President of the Confederate States of America; transferred to West Point in 1823
- Richard Mentor Johnson, Vice President of the United States
- James Speed, Attorney General under Abraham Lincoln, graduated in 1833

=== U.S. senators ===
- David Rice Atchison, Missouri (1843–1855), graduated 1825
- Francis Preston Blair Jr., Missouri (1871–1873), studied law in 1841
- Jesse Bledsoe, Kentucky (1813–1814)
- Lewis V. Bogy, Missouri (1873–1877), graduated 1835
- B. Gratz Brown, Missouri (1863–1867), also 20th Governor of Missouri, graduated in 1845
- Jesse D. Bright, Indiana (1845–1862)
- Alexander Campbell, Ohio (1809–1813)
- Happy Chandler, Kentucky (1939–1945), also Governor of Kentucky and Commissioner of Baseball
- Jeremiah Clemens, Alabama (1849–1853)
- Solomon W. Downs, Louisiana (1847–1853), graduated in 1823
- William M. Gwin, California (1850–1855, 1857–1861), graduated with a medical degree in 1828
- Edward A. Hannegan, Indiana (1843–1849)
- Martin D. Hardin, Kentucky (1816–1817)
- Josiah S. Johnston, Louisiana (1824–1833), graduated in 1802
- George Wallace Jones, Iowa (1848–1859)
- Samuel McRoberts, Illinois (1841–1843)
- Lazarus W. Powell, Kentucky (1859–1865), also Governor of Kentucky
- William Alexander Richardson, Illinois (1863–1865), graduated in 1831
- John M. Robinson, Illinois (1830–1841)
- Marcus A. Smith, Arizona (1912–1921), graduated with a bachelor's degree in 1872 and a law degree in 1876
- William A. Trimble, Ohio (1819–1821), graduated 1810
- Joseph R. Underwood, Kentucky (1847–1853), graduated 1811
- George Graham Vest, Missouri (1879–1903), Confederate, U.S. Congressman, Senator, and prominent lawyer, graduated in 1853.
- Richard Yates, Illinois (1865–1871), also Governor of Illinois, studied law

=== Governors ===
- Luke P. Blackburn, 28th governor of Kentucky, graduated with a medical degree in 1835
- Thomas James Churchill, 13th governor of Arkansas, studied law at Transylvania University at some time between 1844 and 1846.
- Henry Connelly, Territorial Governor of New Mexico, graduated with a medical degree in 1828
- Henry D. Cooke, 1st governor of the District of Columbia (1871–1873), graduated 1844
- Thomas Ford, 8th governor of Illinois, studied law
- Beriah Magoffin, Governor of Kentucky, earned law degree in 1838
- Stevens T. Mason (1811–1843), Governor of Michigan 1835–1840, attended circa 1830
- Charles S. Morehead, Governor of Kentucky, graduated in 1820
- James Fisher Robinson, Governor of Kentucky
- Wilson Shannon, 14th and 16th governor of Ohio

=== U.S. representatives ===
- Silas Adams, Kentucky (1893–1895)
- Landaff Andrews, Kentucky (1839–1843), graduate 1826
- John Edward Bouligny, Louisiana (1859–1861)
- William Orlando Butler, Kentucky (1839–1843), Democratic VP nominee in 1848, and U.S. Army major general
- James Brown Clay, Kentucky (1857–1859), also U.S. Ambassador to Portugal
- David Grant Colson, Kentucky (1895–1899)
- John J. Hardin, Illinois (1843–1845)
- Guy U. Hardy, Colorado (1919–1933)
- Carter Harrison Sr., Illinois (1875–1879), also Mayor of Chicago, graduated with a law degree in 1855
- Richard Hawes, Kentucky (1837–1841), also Confederate Governor of Kentucky
- James S. Jackson, Kentucky (1861), graduated with law degree in 1845
- John Telemachus Johnson, Kentucky (1821–1825)
- Nathaniel Pope, Illinois (1819–1821)
- George Robertson, Kentucky (1817–1821)
- James S. Rollins, Missouri (1861–1865), "Father of the University of Missouri", graduated in 1834
- Green C. Smith, Kentucky (1863–1866), also Territorial Governor of Montana, graduated 1849
- William Wright Southgate, Kentucky (1837–1839)

=== Judges ===
- Nancy L. Allf, Judge, Eighth Judicial District Court, Clark County, Nevada
- Claria Horn Boom, Judge of the United States District Court for the Eastern District of Kentucky and United States District Court for the Western District of Kentucky
- Karen K. Caldwell, Chief Judge of the United States District Court for the Eastern District of Kentucky
- Ninian Edwards Gray, Judge, Kentucky Circuit Courts, also spent time as Attorney of the State
- John Marshall Harlan, U.S. Supreme Court Justice, graduated in 1853 and was the first justice to have earned a modern law degree.
- Samuel Freeman Miller, Associate Justice, United States Supreme Court; graduated with medical degree in 1838
- Ana C. Reyes, Judge of the United States District Court for the District of Columbia

=== Other politicians ===
- Stephen F. Austin, founder of Texas, graduated in 1810
- James G. Birney, abolitionist, politician and jurist
- Francis Preston Blair, co-founder of the Republican Party, graduated 1811
- Levi Boone, mayor of Chicago, graduated from medical school in 1829
- Cassius Marcellus Clay, abolitionist, state legislator, and ambassador to Russia, graduated in 1831
- Andrew Jackson Donelson, U.S. Ambassador to Prussia
- Thomas Burton Hanly, Arkansas state legislator and judge, CSA Congressman, graduated in 1834
- Teresa Isaac, mayor of Lexington, Kentucky, 2002–2006
- George W. Johnson, Confederate "governor" of Kentucky and Kentucky State Representative, received three degrees from Transylvania University: an A.B. in 1829, an LL.B. in 1832, and an M.A. in 1833
- George B. Kinkead, Kentucky Secretary of State (1846–1847)
- Gustav Koerner, U.S. Minister to Spain and Lt. Governor of Illinois, studied law in 1834 and 1835
- John Calvin McCoy, founder of Kansas City, Missouri, studied 1826–1827
- Daniel Mongiardo, Lieutenant Governor of Kentucky
- Steve Nunn, former member of the Kentucky House of Representatives
- Robert Smith Todd, member of the Kentucky Senate, father of First Lady Mary Todd Lincoln
- Susan Tyler Witten, Kentucky state representative

== Military ==
- John Breckinridge Castleman, a Confederate officer who later rose to the rank of Brigadier General in the U.S. Army, studied law there immediately before the outbreak of the Civil War
- Carl Rogers Darnall, U.S. Brigadier General credited with originating the technique of liquid chlorination of drinking water
- Ethelbert Ludlow Dudley, prominent physician and Union military commander in the Civil War, graduated in 1842 and joined the staff of the Medical School
- Basil Duke, graduated the school of law in 1858. Later married Henrietta Morgan, sister of John Hunt Morgan, in 1861. Basil became a lieutenant in Morgan's Second Kentucky Cavalry. After Morgan's death, he was promoted to brigade commander. He later practiced law in Louisville, Kentucky and served as counsel for the Louisville and Nashville Railroad. He was elected to the state legislature in 1869
- Richard Montgomery Gano, Confederate General
- Albert Sidney Johnston, Confederate General
- Arthur D. Nicholson, United States Army officer shot and killed by a Soviet sentry in 1985 while conducting intelligence activities in East Germany
- Jerome B. Robertson, Confederate General, Texas politician, graduated in 1835
- George Shannon, member of the Lewis and Clark Expedition
- Joseph O. Shelby, Confederate major general during the American Civil War, graduated 1850

== Media and the arts ==
- James Lane Allen, author
- Ned Beatty, actor
- Thomas Holley Chivers, poet
- B. O. Flower, journalist
- W. W. Fosdick, poet
- Matt Jones, radio host, attorney, and founder of Kentucky Sports Radio
- Matthew Harris Jouett, artist, enrolled in 1804
- Thomas Satterwhite Noble, painter
- Gil Rogers, actor

== Medicine ==
- Edward A. Eckenhoff, President and CEO National Rehabilitation Hospital, Washington, D.C.
- John E. Fryer, American psychiatrist and gay rights activist best known for his anonymous speech at the 1972 American Psychiatric Association (APA) annual conference where he appeared in disguise and under the name "Dr. Henry Anonymous". This event has been cited as a key factor in the decision to de-list homosexuality as a mental illness from the APA's Diagnostic and Statistical Manual of Mental Disorders.
- Albert Kellogg, doctor and noted botanist
- Crawford Long, American surgeon and pharmacist best known for his first use of inhaled sulfuric ether as an anesthetic.
- Joseph Nash McDowell, noted doctor
- Lewis Sayre, leading American orthopedic surgeon of the 19th century
- Hugh Toland, surgeon, founder of the University of California, San Francisco (UCSF)

== Sports ==
- Cy Barger, major league baseball player
- Jack Curtice, college football coach
- Trey Kramer, Professional soccer and football player
- Lee Rose, basketball coach
- Kyle Smith, Professional soccer player

== Other fields ==
- Eugene C. Barker, historian; wrote The Life of Stephen F. Austin (1925); received LL.D. from Transylvania in 1940
- Charles Lynn Pyatt, dean, Lexington Theological Seminary
- Clyde Roper, zoologist
- James Lanier, prominent 19th-century lawyer, banker, railroad investor, and financier who gained national influence by financing the Union during the Civil War.
