= Senator Gray =

Senator Gray or Grey may refer to:

- Algernon Sidney Gray (1814–1878), Virginia State Senate
- Andrew Gray (senator) (died 1849), Delaware State Senate
- Benjamin E. Grey (1809–1875), Kentucky State Senate
- Bob Gray (South Dakota politician) (born 1971), South Dakota State Senate
- E. Arthur Gray (1925–2007), New York State Senate
- Edwin Gray (1743–after 1815), Virginia State Senate
- Elmon T. Gray (1925–2011), Virginia State Senate
- Frederick Thomas Gray (1918–1992), Virginia State Senate
- Garland Gray (1902–1977), Virginia State Senate
- George Gray (Delaware politician) (1840–1925), U.S. Senator from Delaware
- Gordon Gray (politician) (1909–1982), North Carolina State Senate
- Hamilton H. Gray (1827–1902), Wisconsin State Senate
- Henry Gray (politician) (1816–1892), Louisiana State Senate
- Isaac P. Gray (1828–1895), Indiana State Senate
- James A. Gray Jr. (1889–1952), North Carolina State Senate
- James P. Gray (New Hampshire politician) (born 1949), New Hampshire State Senate
- John H. Gray (Illinois politician) (1855–?), Illinois State Senate
- Linda Gray (politician) (born 1939), Arizona State Senate
- Ninian Edwards Gray (1807–1859), Kentucky State Senate
- Peter W. Gray (1819–1874), Texas State Senate
- Rachel Gray (1930–2010), North Carolina State Senate
- Rick Gray (Arizona politician) (fl. 2010s), Arizona State Senate
- Robert Gray (North Carolina politician) (1855–?), North Carolina State Senate
- Ted Gray (politician) (born 1927), Ohio State Senate
- Truman Gray (1854–1940), Mississippi State Senate
- Walter J. Gray (1928–2024), Rhode Island State Senate
- William Gray (Massachusetts politician) (1750–1825), Massachusetts State Senate
- William Henry Grey (1829–1888), Arkansas State Senate

== See also ==
- Elvi Gray-Jackson (born 1953), Alaska State Senate
