= Patricia Louise Dudley =

American zoologist

- Patricia Dudley at Friday Harbor
- Born: May 22, 1929; Denver, Colorado, U.S.
- Died: September 30, 2004 (aged 75); Seattle, Washington, U.S.
- Education: University of Colorado, University of Washington
- Scientific career
- Fields: Zoology
- Institutions: Columbia University, Barnard College
- Thesis: Development of Notodelphyid Copepods and the Application of Larval Characteristics to the Systematics of some Species from the Northeastern Pacific. (1957)
- Doctoral advisor: Paul Louis Illg
- Other academic advisors: Robert William Pennak

Patricia Louise (Pat) Dudley (May 22, 1929 – September 30, 2004) was an American zoologist specializing in research of copepods. An early pioneer using an electron microscope to study copepod organs and tissues, she taught at Barnard College for 35 years and served as Chair of the Biological Sciences department. Dudley was a National Science Foundation faculty fellow. She donated funds to establish the Patricia L. Dudley Endowment at Friday Harbor Labs, where she conducted research.

== Early life and education ==
Dudley was born on May 22, 1929, the daughter of David C. and Carolyn (Latas) Dudley, in Denver, Colorado, where her father was a salesman for State and School Supply. Her father died in 1932, and her family lived in Colorado Springs with her maternal grandparents while she was a child. She graduated from Colorado Springs High School in 1947.

In 1951, Dudley graduated with a B.S. from the University of Colorado, where she studied under the direction of Robert William Pennak, a specialist in limnology. She received her Master of Science in 1953 at the University of Washington, completing her thesis on the subject of fauna present in four brooks in Boulder County, Colorado.

Dudley continued her education with Paul Louis Illg at the University of Washington, where she contributed research on aquatic organisms, including crustaceans known as copepods and invertebrates known as tunicates, throughout the various stages of their development. In 1957 she defended her thesis, Development of Notodelphyid Copepods and the Application of Larval Characteristics to the Systematics of some Species from the Northeastern Pacific.

== Career ==
Following her graduate studies, she joined the faculty of Columbia University in 1959, teaching zoology at Barnard College, a position she held until her retirement in 1994. She spent two years (in 1969 and 1971) as an investigator in the Systematics Ecology Program at the Marine Biological Laboratory. In 1979 she became Chair of the Biological Sciences department at Barnard.

She was among the first to use electron microscopy to study the fine structures of copepod organs and tissues.

Dudley served as Secretary of the Invertebrate Biology section of the American Society of Zoologists from 1973–1976. She also was a member of the American Institute of Biological Science, the Marine Biological Association of the United Kingdom, and the American Microscopical Society.

During her time as a graduate student in Washington, she worked at Friday Harbor Laboratories, as an instructor in marine invertebrate zoology. She often spent summers there, teaching and continuing copepod research. She left a bequest establishing The Patricia L. Dudley Endowment to support "research or scholarships for the study of systematics, the structure of marine organisms, or for marine invertebrate ecology". She directed that fund recipients spend significant time at Friday Harbor, and added her desire that "findings contribute to the understanding of evolutionary relationships".

Dudley died on September 30, 2004, in Seattle, Washington. Dudley's papers are archived in the Special Collections of the University of Washington Libraries. Her obituary in Monoculus: Copepod Newsletter described her as "one of [copepodology]'s clever innovators" and "a knowledgeable, serious, and tireless teacher".

== Honors ==
Dudley was named a National Science Foundation faculty fellow in 1965.

== Publications ==
=== Reports ===
- Dudley, Patricia L.; Illg, Paul L. (1991). Marine Flora and Fauna of the Eastern United States Copepoda, Cyclopoida: Archinotodelphyidae, Notodelphyidae, and Ascidicolidae (PDF) (Report). NOAA.

=== Articles ===
- Matsubara, J.A.; Dudley, P.L. (1976). "Fine Structural Studies of the Dicyemid Mesozoan, Dicyemmenea californica McConnaughey. I. Adult Stages". The Journal of Parasitology. 62 (3): 377–389. doi:10.2307/3279146. JSTOR 3279146.
- Dudley, P.L. (1972). "Synaptonemal polycomplexes in spermatocytes of the gooseneck barnacle, Pollicipes polymerus Sowerby (Crustacea: Cirripedia)". Chromosoma. 40 (3): 221–242. doi:10.1007/BF00326178. S2CID 33285122.
- Dudley, P.L. (1972). "The fine structure of a cephalic sensory receptor in the copepod Doropygus seclusus Illg (Crustacea: Copepoda: Notodelphyidae)". Journal of Morphology. 138 (4): 407–431. doi:10.1002/jmor.1051380403. PMID 30366485. S2CID 53092201.
- Dudley, P.L. (1968). "A light and electron microscopic study of tissue interactions between a parasitic copepod, Scolecodes huntsmani (Henderson), and its host ascidian, Styela gibbsii (Stimpson)". Journal of Morphology. 124 (3): 263–281. doi:10.1002/jmor.1051240302. PMID 5657933. S2CID 44507988.

=== Books ===
- Illg, P.L.; Dudley, P.L. (1980). The family Ascidicolidae and its subfamilies (Copepoda, Cyclopoida), with descriptions of new species. Paris: Éditions du Muséum.
- Dudley, P.L. (1966). Development and systematics of some Pacific marine symbiotic copepods : a study of the biology of the Notodelphyidae, associates of Ascidians. Seattle: University of Washington.
