= Friday Harbor Laboratories =

Marine biology field station of the University of Washington

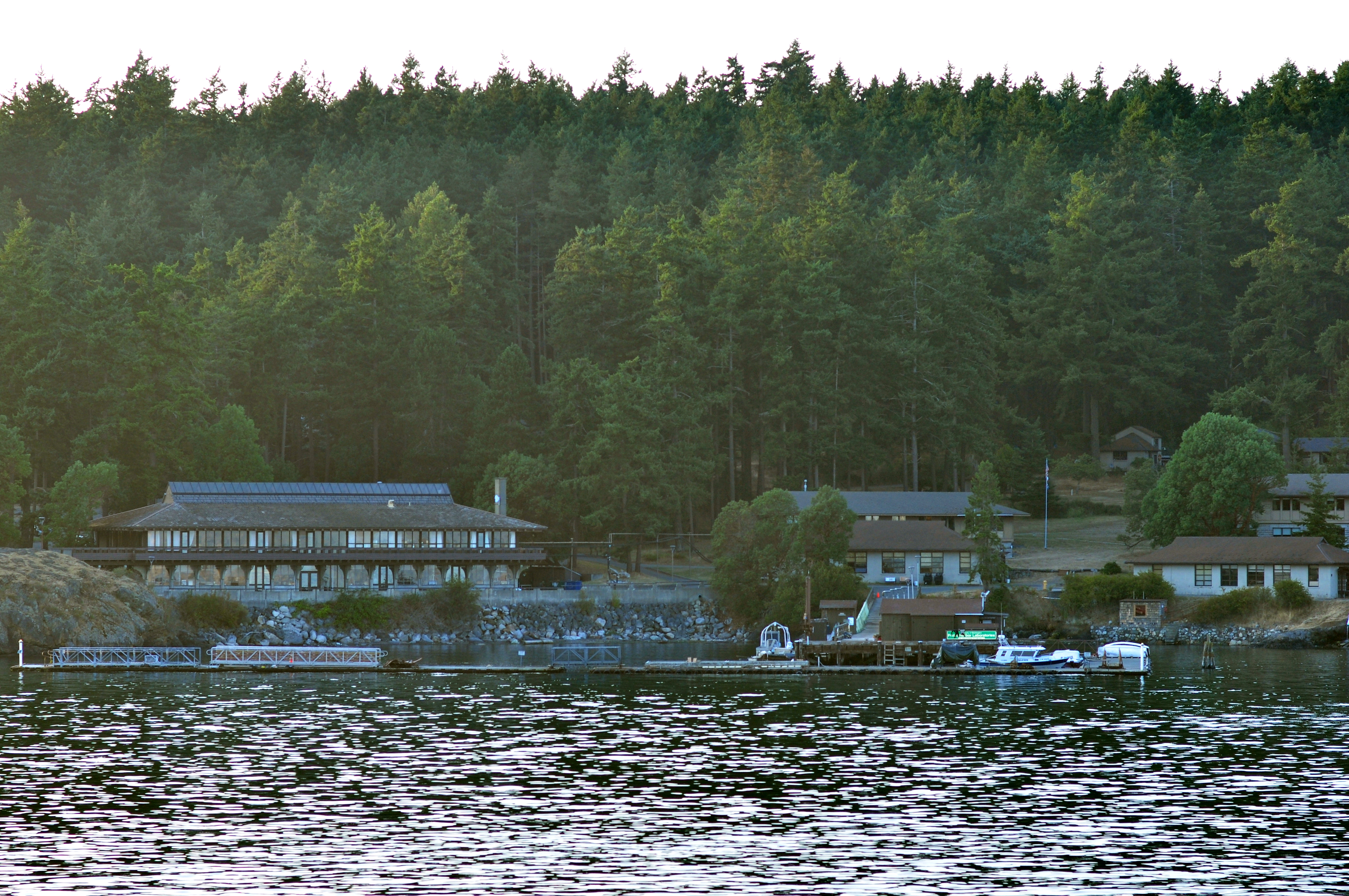
- University of Washington Friday Harbor Laboratories
- Established: 1904; 122 years ago
- Field of research: Marine biology
- Location: Friday Harbor, Washington, United States; 48°32′46″N 123°00′46″W
- Operating agency: University of Washington
- Website: fhl.uw.edu
- Location within Washington (state)

Friday Harbor Laboratories (FHL), is a marine biology field station of the University of Washington, located in Friday Harbor, San Juan Island, Washington, United States. Friday Harbor Labs is known for its intensive summer classes offered to competitive graduate students from around the world in fields of marine biology and other marine sciences.

== Overview ==
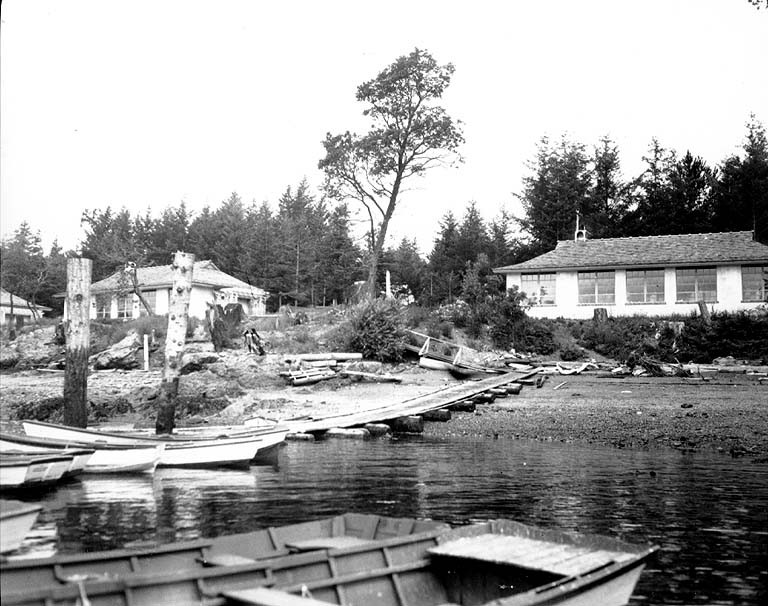
Friday Harbor Biological Station, ca 1926

Autumn and spring academic terms include courses designed for advanced undergraduates as well as graduate students; most spring and fall classes run 10 weeks and feature an original research component. In addition to serving students, Friday Harbor Laboratories has a small resident scientific staff and offers year-round laboratory, library, and housing accommodations for visiting researchers and their families. Research areas include marine algae, marine conservation biology, marine invertebrate zoology, comparative invertebrate embryology, experimental and field approaches in biology and paleontology, functional morphology and ecology of marine fishes, invertebrate larval ecology, and other current topics in marine science and oceanography.

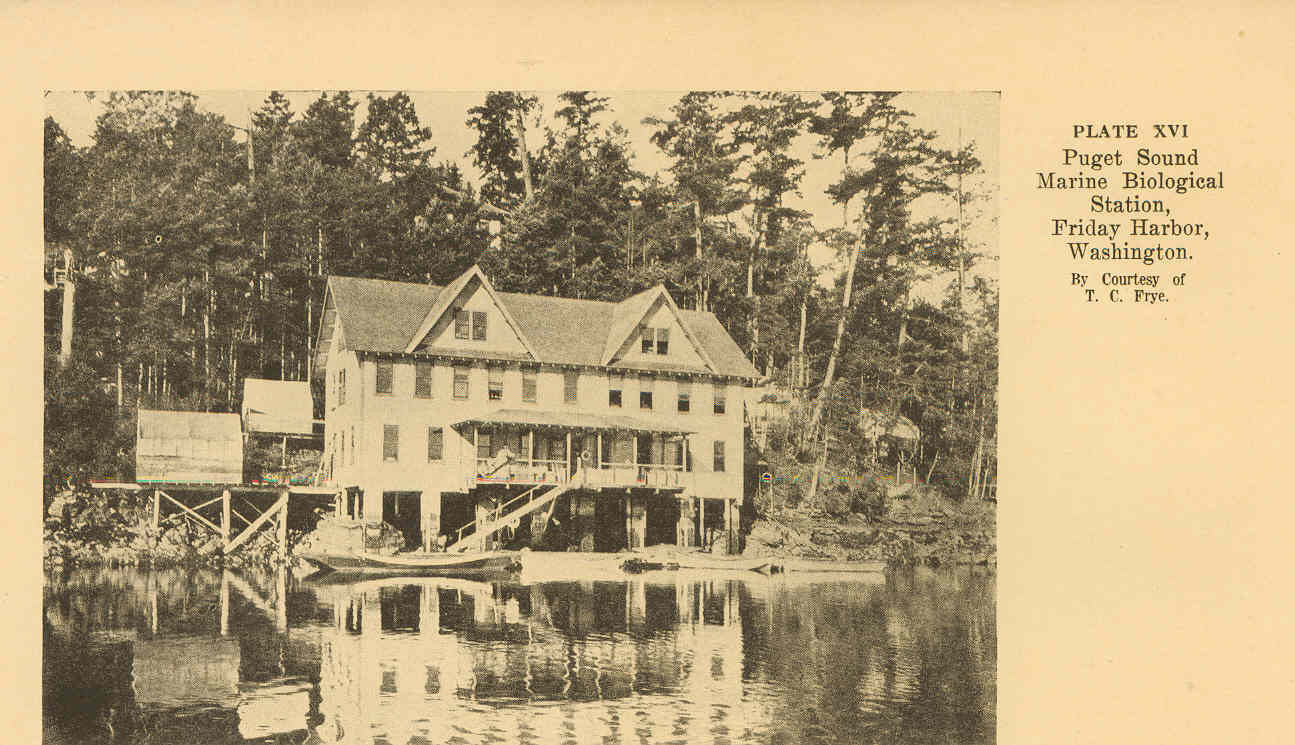
Puget Sound Marine Biological Station, Friday Harbor, Washington, 1915.

FHL was founded in 1904 by University of Washington Zoology Professor Trevor Kincaid, who became its first director. The green fluorescent protein was discovered at FHL in 1962. There is a sculpture by Julian Voss-Andreae at the campus to commemorate the discovery.

In 2004, zoologist Patricia Louise Dudley, who had spent many summers at the Laboratory, created an endowment to support "research or scholarships for the study of systematics, the structure of marine organisms, or for marine invertebrate ecology". She directed that fund recipients spend significant time at Friday Harbor, and added her desire that "findings contribute to the understanding of evolutionary relationships".
