= Andy Jackson (tennis) =

American tennis player and coach

Current position
- Title: Head coach
- Team: Arkansas Razorbacks
- Conference: SEC

Biographical details
- Born: August 14, 1961 (age 65); Oneida, Kentucky

Playing career
- 1982–1984: Kentucky

Coaching career (HC unless noted)
- 1985–2001: Mississippi State
- 2002–2012: Florida

Head coaching record
- Overall: 496–233 (.680)

Accomplishments and honors

Championships
- SEC (1992, 1993, 2003, 2005); SEC Tournament (1996, 2005, 2011)

David Andrew Jackson (born August 14, 1961) is an American college tennis coach and former college player. Jackson previously served as the head coach of the Mississippi State Bulldogs men's tennis team and Lady Bulldogs women's tennis team of Mississippi State University, and the Florida Gators men's tennis team of the University of Florida.

== Early years ==
Jackson was born in Oneida, Kentucky in 1961. He attended Franklin County High School in Frankfort, Kentucky, and played tennis for the Franklin County Flyers high school tennis team. He is a descendant of U.S. President Andrew Jackson and American Civil War general Stonewall Jackson.

== Playing career ==
He attended the University of Kentucky in Lexington, Kentucky, where he lettered for the Kentucky Wildcats men's tennis team from 1982 to 1984. As a senior in 1984, Jackson was the Wildcats' team captain.

== Coaching career ==
Jackson was the head coach for the Mississippi State Lady Bulldogs women's tennis team from 1985 to 1989, and then the head coach of the Bulldogs men's tennis team from 1989 to 2001. His Bulldogs men's team finished in a four-way tie in the Southeastern Conference (SEC) regular season in 1992, won the SEC regular season championship in 1993, and won the SEC tournament title in 1996.

He joined the Florida Gators coaching staff in the summer of 2001. The Gators won regular season SEC championships in 2003 and 2005.

After winning the SEC men's tennis tournament in 2011, Jackson's Gators ended their season in the round of sixteen in the NCAA Tournament when they lost 4–2 to the SEC rival Kentucky Wildcats. The Gators again advanced to the NCAA round of sixteen in 2012, before losing to the Ohio State Buckeyes.

In eleven seasons as the Gators' head coach, he compiled an overall win-loss of 209–82; his 28-season career win-loss record is 496–233.

== See also ==
- Florida Gators
- History of the University of Florida
- Kentucky Wildcats
- List of University of Kentucky alumni
- Mississippi State Bulldogs
- University Athletic Association
