= Palmer High School (Colorado) =

General William J. Palmer High School

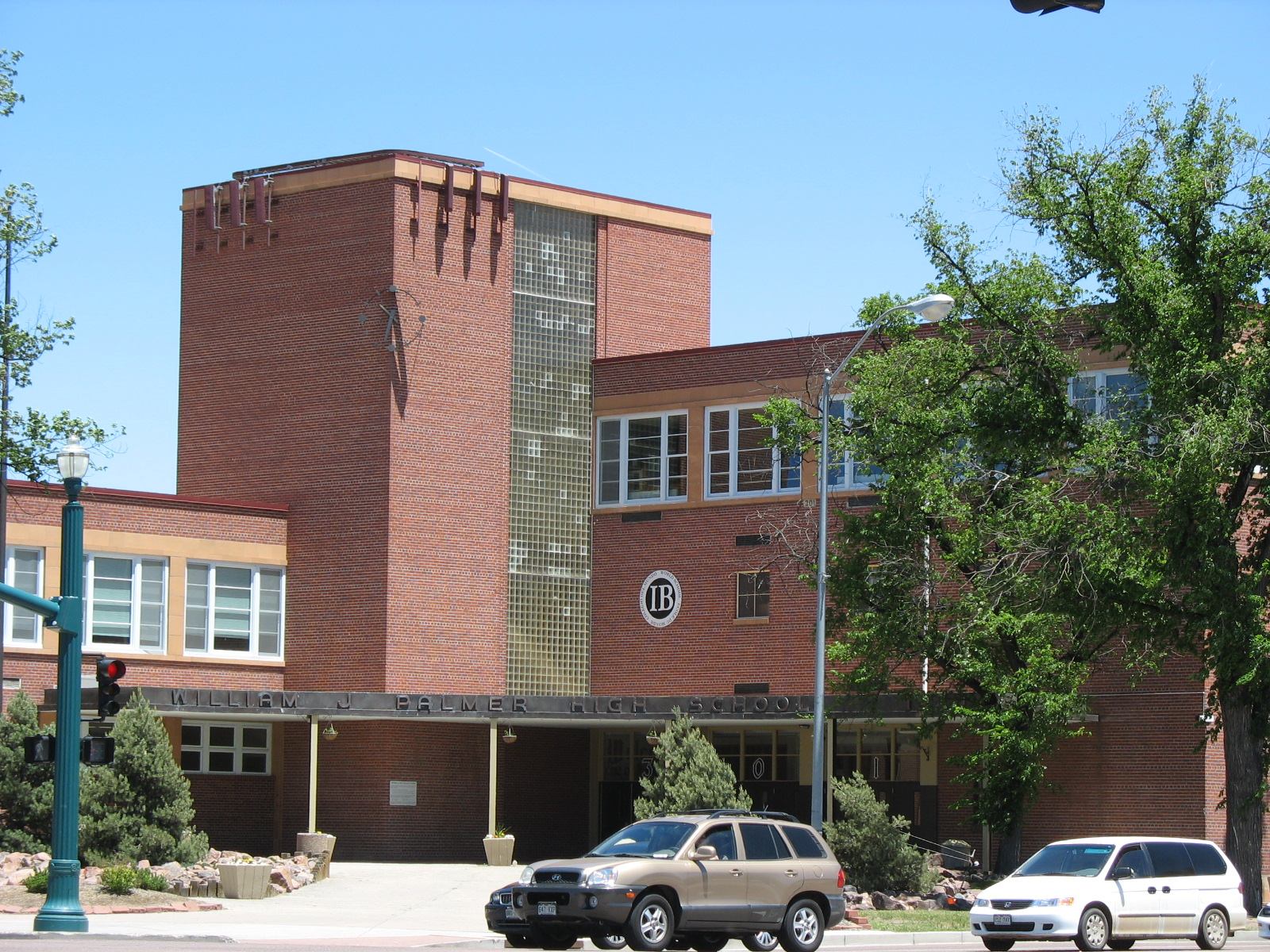
- Front of Palmer High School

Location
- 301 North Nevada Avenue; Colorado Springs, Colorado 80903; United States; 38°50′20″N 104°49′12″W

Information
- Other names: Palmer High School, Palmer, PHS
- Former name: Colorado Springs High School
- School type: Public high school
- Motto: A Tradition of Excellence
- Established: 1875 (151 years ago)
- School district: Colorado Springs 11
- CEEB code: 060288
- NCES School ID: 080306000257
- Principal: Krista Burke
- Teaching staff: 69.60 (FTE)
- Grades: 9–12
- Enrollment: 1,344 (2023–2024)
- Student to teacher ratio: 19.31
- Colors: Brown and white
- Athletics conference: CHSAA
- Mascot: Terrors (Eaglebeak)
- Accreditation: Western Association of Schools and Colleges
- Newspaper: The Lever
- Yearbook: Terror Trail
- Feeder schools: Holmes Middle School; Galileo Middle School; Mann Middle School; North Middle School
- Website: www.d11.org/palmer

General William J. Palmer High School, commonly referred to as Palmer High School (PHS), is a public high school in Colorado Springs, Colorado, United States. It is the flagship high school of School District 11 and has the oldest International Baccalaureate (IB) program in the area.

== History ==
Palmer High School was originally named Colorado Springs High School, and was first constructed in 1874. The building was damaged by fire in 1890, and in 1893 a new building was opened. The present building—located on 301 North Nevada Avenue—was built by the Works Progress Administration under Franklin Delano Roosevelt in 1940. Palmer High School was renamed in 1959 after the city's founder, General William Jackson Palmer. At that date, the city had expanded enough to warrant the building of a second high school, Roy J. Wasson High School.

=== Gender-inclusive bathrooms ===
In 2016 seniors Park Long and Halle Schall, both genderqueer students, along with others from the school's Gay-Straight-Trans Alliance, lobbied school officials for gender-inclusive bathrooms due to the discrimination experienced by transgender students. Palmer was the first high school in Southern Colorado to have gender-inclusive bathrooms.

== Extracurricular activities ==
=== Mock Trial ===
Palmer's Mock Trial program won the Southern Colorado Regional Competition in 2008, 2009, 2010, 2011, 2012, 2014, and 2015; the Colorado State Competition in 2009 and 2013; and took 14th place in the National High School Mock Trial Tournament in 2013.

== Notable alumni ==
- Lance Armstrong (graduated elsewhere)
- Albert Balows (1921–2006), clinical microbiologist
- Patricia Louise Dudley (1947, as Colorado Springs High School), zoologist specializing in copepods
- Chris Fowler (1980), host of ESPN's College Gameday
- Robert L. Gordon III, (1975) Deputy Undersecretary of Defense for Military Community and Family Policy
- Robert M. Isaac (1945, as Colorado Springs High School), mayor of Colorado Springs
- Reggie Jackson (2008), basketball player for the Denver Nuggets (2023-2024) and Philadelphia 76ers (2024-current) of the NBA
- Ray Jardine (1961), rock climber, adventurer, inventor of "Friends" spring-loaded camming device
- Sho Nakamori, artistic gymnast and member of the United States men's national artistic gymnastics team
- Cassandra Peterson (1969), actress; played Elvira, Mistress of the Dark
- Laura Veirs, singer-songwriter
