= Dale T. Chapman =

American school administrator

Dr. Dale T. Chapman is an American school administrator. He is the former president of Lewis and Clark Community College in Godfrey, Illinois.

== Education ==
Chapman received his Doctorate in Education, with a concentration in Administration, Planning and Social Policy, from Harvard University. He earned a master's degree from Michigan State University, a bachelor's degree from the University of Kentucky and an associate degree from Northern Community College in Kentucky.

== Career ==
Prior to Lewis and Clark, his professional career included graduate and administrative positions with the College Board, the American Council on Education, Education Commission of the States, Harvard University, Suomi College, Kentucky Council on Higher Education, University of Kentucky, and Jefferson Community College.

Chapman also has an extensive background in working with state and regional organizations. His past statewide affiliations include: The Legislative Committee, Illinois Council of Community College Presidents; Member and Program Chair of the Illinois Lewis and Clark Bicentennial Commission and Vice Chairman, Governor's Higher Education Transition Team. Regional affiliations have included, among others, the following: Board Chairman, River Bend Growth Association; Board Chairman, Madison County Urban League; Campaign Chairman, United Way of Greater St. Louis; Board Member, St. Anthony's Hospital; Board Chairman, Riverbend Head Start and Family Services; Board Member, Greater Alton/Twin Rivers Convention & Visitors Bureau; Executive Committee, Southwestern Illinois Employers Association; President, Lewis and Clark Community College Foundation; Board Chair, U. S. Army Corps of Engineers Meeting of the Rivers Foundation; Board Member, Education Committee, Missouri Botanical Garden; and Chair, Salvation Army.

During his tenure as the president of Lewis and Clark, the college's enrollment more than quadrupled from 3,000 to 20,000 students. Chapman has also overseen the construction of many major capital projects totaling more than $123,000,000. Major projects include: the McPike Complex, which includes the Olin Science Building, The Commons, Robert L. Watson Math Building and the Templin Nursing Building; the River Bend Arena, the renovation of Trimpe; the construction and renovation of the N.O. Nelson Campus in Edwardsville, the construction of the Macoupin County Community Education Center in Carlinville, the renovation and construction of music facilities including the Ringhausen Music Building, the renovation of Gilman Hall and the relocation of the Benjamin Godfrey Chapel; the National Great Rivers Research and Education Center's Jerry F. Costello Confluence Field Station, and many other campus improvement and renovation projects.

The college received national publicity in 2010 when Chapman retired (on May 31) in an effort to access his vested retirement funds and resolve financial issues that stemmed from the purchase of an investment property in Massachusetts a number of years prior. According to the college, the Board of Trustees reluctantly acceded to Chapman's retirement request and indicated they were "hopeful that Dr. Chapman would consider being rehired as President once he is able to resolve his financial issues." Vice President Gary Ayres was named Acting President.

In August 2010, the Board voted unanimously to rehire Chapman as president. Board Chairman Robert Watson was quoted as saying, “For nearly 20 years Dr. Chapman has led Lewis and Clark Community College through tremendous periods of growth; he has worked with local, state and national agencies to expand learning and cultural opportunities for residents of this district; and he continues to be a respected leader in higher education across the nation and in this community. He has a proven track record of success at Lewis and Clark, and we are pleased to welcome him back as president.”

The actions of the Board of Trustees that allowed the arrangement have been questioned, as they held the position open and did not search for a new president. A similar situation led to the resignation of Louisiana Commissioner of Education Sally Clausen of Baton Rouge earlier that year after she retired for one day and returned to the job to collect both salary of more than $500,000 annually and retirement benefits simultaneously.

The practice of double dipping is illegal in most states and has been outlawed in Illinois beginning in 2011. Although Chapman's situation is slightly ambiguous, he is not receiving an annuity and therefore not truly receiving two simultaneous salaries.

Chapman retired in December 2019 at the request of the Board of Trustees.
