= Esendugue Greg Fonsah =

Esendugue Greg Fonsah (born September 15, 1958, in Tiko, Cameroon) is a Cameroonian-born agricultural economist, educator, and international development specialist whose work focuses on agribusiness, agricultural marketing, trade, and policy within the global fresh food industry.

He is Professor and Research, Extension, and Instruction (REI) Coordinator in the Department of Agricultural and Applied Economics at the University of Georgia’s Tifton Campus. He is also the author of Economics of Banana Production and Marketing in the Tropics (1995; 2012), which examines the agronomic and economic dimensions of banana production and marketing in Africa and other tropical regions.

== Education ==
Fonsah earned his Bachelor of Science in Management from Berea College, Kentucky, USA in 1983, followed by an MBA in Business Administration from Morehead State University, in 1985. He completed his Master of Science in Agricultural Economics at the University of Kentucky, USA in 1987 and received his Ph.D. in Agricultural Economics from the University of Nigeria, Nsukka, Nigeria, in 1993.

== Career ==
Before joining the University of Georgia , Fonsah held senior corporate positions in several multinational agricultural enterprises, including Del Monte Fresh Produce in Cameroon, Lapanday Food Company in the Philippines, and Aloha Farms in Hawaii, USA.

At the University of Georgia, Fonsah developed programs integrating research, teaching, and extension in agricultural and applied economics. He is known for introducing banana research and production to Georgia and other parts of the southeastern United States through multi-state collaborations with Florida A&M University and Auburn University.

Fonsah has also served as President of the Food Distribution Research Society (FDRS), where he oversaw organizational growth and research dissemination. He chaired the USDA Multi-State Research Group S-1088, “Specialty Crops and Food Systems: Exploring Markets, Supply Chains, and Policy Dimensions.” Internationally, he serves as Chancellor of Fomic Polytechnic University Institute in Cameroon, Extraordinary Professor at North-West University Business School in South Africa, and External Examiner for graduate programs at the University of Ghana, Legon.

== Research ==
Fonsah's research and outreach activities focus on sustainable agricultural systems, market development, and policy innovation. He has authored hundreds of scientific journal articles, books, chapters, extension and numerous other publications on topics such as the economic evaluation of specialty crop production systems, the impact of severe weather on Georgia's fruit and vegetable industry, and production, marketing, postharvest disease management in bananas.

He also investigated the factors affecting banana agricultural value chain in Bangladesh, from producers to end users (2017). His book, Economics of Banana Production and Marketing in the Tropics (1995 & republished in 2012) was a game changer as his recommendations was adapted by Del Monte Fresh Produce, Cameroon and landed him a more lucrative and challenging expatriate position with Lapanday Food Corporation. He also co-authored the dynamic analysis of US banana demand by source: A focus on Latin American suppliers (2015) and estimated US banana import demand using the generalized dynamic Rotterdam model.

Further, Fonsah's work on Traceability Systems in the Fruit and Vegetable Industry (2006) addressed the economic efficiency of implementing safety and origin tracking in supply chains.

In addition, he conducted an Economic Analysis of Southern Highbush Blueberry Production Using Drip Irrigation and Frost Protection in Georgia (2022).
