= Meir Bialer =

Israeli pharmacologist (born 1948)

- מאיר ביאלר
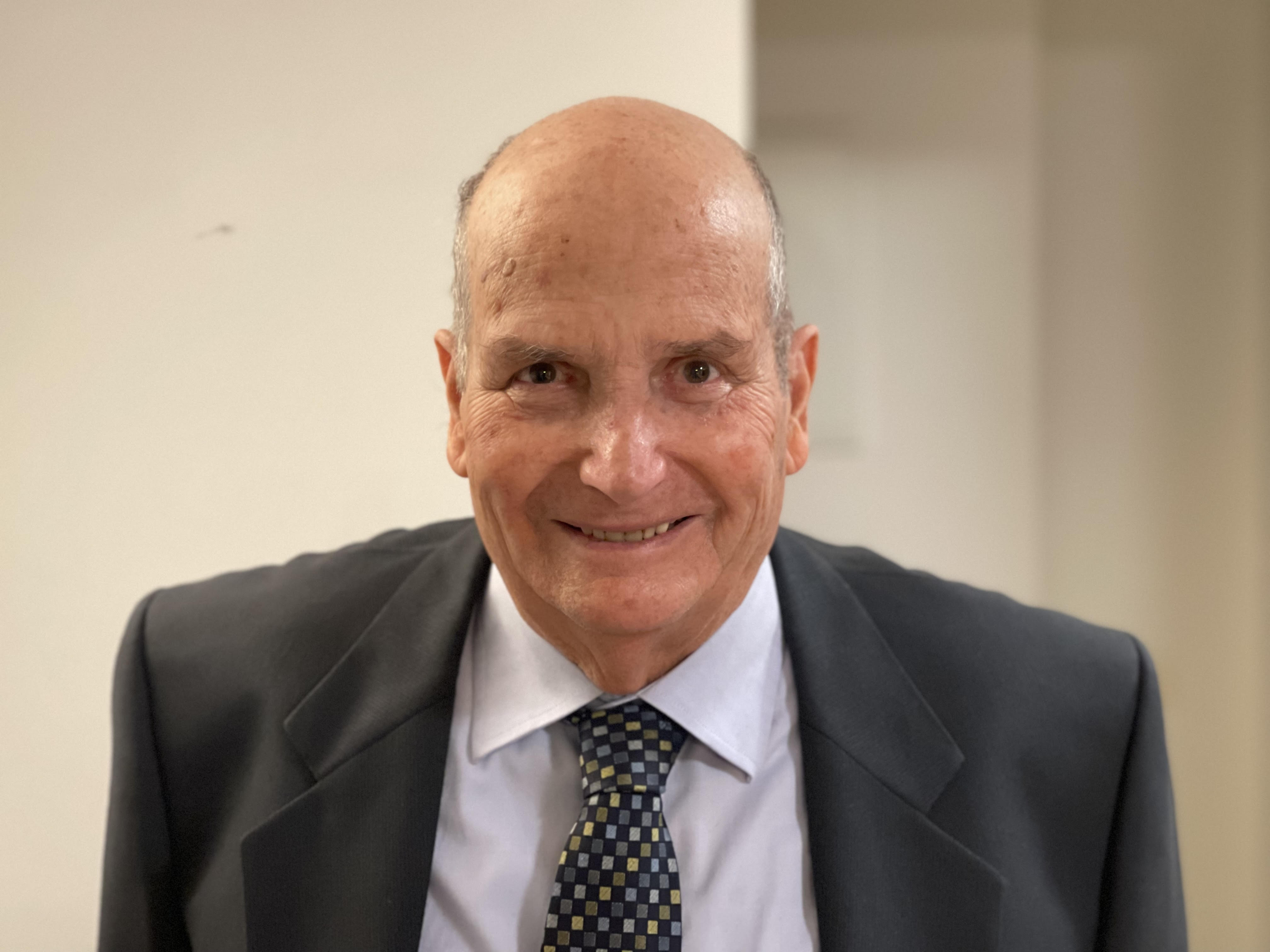
- Born: January 30, 1948 (age 78); Petach Tikva, Israel
- Occupation: Professor of Pharmacy
- Spouse: Shoshana Novak (1970–present)
- Children: Michal, Oded

Academic background
- Education: The Hebrew University of Jerusalem
- Thesis: Antiviral Structure-Activity Relationship of Distamycin and its Derivatives (1977)

Academic work
- Discipline: Pharmacology
- Sub-discipline: Epileptology
- Institutions: The Hebrew University of Jerusalem

Meir Bialer (Hebrew: מאיר ביאלר; born January 30, 1948) is an Israeli pharmacologist who is a David H. Eisenberg Emeritus (active) Professor of Pharmacy at the School of Pharmacy, Faculty of Medicine, of the Hebrew University of Jerusalem.

== Biography ==
Bialer was born in Petach Tikva, Israel, to a Jewish family. He completed his service in the Israeli Army in 1971-73.

He received his B.Sc. Pharm in Pharmacy in 1969, his M.Sc. in Medicinal Chemistry from The Hebrew University of Jerusalem in 1971, his MBA in 1976 and his PhD in Medicinal Chemistry from the same university in 1977, with a dissertation on "Antiviral Structure-Activity Relationship of Distamycin and its Derivatives."

After post-doctoral studies at the University of Florida (1977–79) and University of Kentucky (1979–80), he became a Lecturer (1980–84) and then Senior Lecturer (1984–88) and then Associate Professor (1988–93) at the School of Pharmacy, Faculty of Medicine, The Hebrew University of Jerusalem. In 1993 he became a Full Professor at the School of Pharmacy, Faculty of Medicine, The Hebrew University of Jerusalem. Currently, he is serving as a David H. Eisenberg Emeritus (active) Professor at the School of Pharmacy, Faculty of Medicine, The Hebrew University of Jerusalem.

Bialer was president of the Israel League Against Epilepsy, a branch of the International League Against Epilepsy (ILAE), from 1996 to 2001, and as the chair of ILAE-Europe from 2009 to 2017. He also served as president of Israel Society of Clinical Pharmacy and Biopharmaceutics (ISCPB), a member of the European Society of Pharmaceutical Sciences (EUFEPS) (1991–2001).

== Research work ==
Bialer’s research interests include:

1. Pharmacokinetics of new antiepileptic drugs (AEDs) and pharmacokinetic-based design of new antiepileptics and CNS drugs. In this regard he has been utilizing structure pharmacokinetic pharmacodynamic relationship (SPPR) studies to design and develop new CNS drugs with better potency, lack of teratogenicity, and a wide safety margin;
2. Pharmacokinetic analysis of new drugs, sustained release dosage forms, and novel drug delivery systems (DDS);
3. Stereospecific pharmacokinetic and pharmacodynamic analysis of chiral drugs;
4. Pharmacogenetics of CNS drugs;
5. Pharmacoresistance to AEDs.

In these areas, he has 264 peer-reviewed publications, and is an author of 16 book chapters. Since 1981 he has supervised 22 MSc students and 31 PhD students.

== Awards ==
- A Fellow of the American Association of Pharmaceutical Sciences - AAPS (1992)
- Kaye Innovation Awards at The Hebrew University of Jerusalem (2000, 2006, and 2007)
- Ambassador for Epilepsy Award of The International League Against Epilepsy – ILLAE and The International Bureau for Epilepsy (IBE; 2001)
- European Epileptology Award (2022)

== Personal life ==
Meir married Shoshana Novak in 1970. They have two children Michal Bialer-Mor Yosef and Oded Bialer, as well as five grandchildren: Adi, Omri and Roni Bialer and Adam and Eitan Mor Yosef.

== Selected publications ==
- S. Eyal, B. Yagen, E. Sobol, Y. Altschuler, M. Shmuel and M. Bialer: The activity of antiepileptic drugs as histone deacetylase inhibitors. Epilepsia 45:737-744 (2004).
- M. Bialer, D.R. Doose, B. Murthy, C. Curtin, S-S Wang, R.E. Twyman and S. Schwabe: Pharmacokinetic interactions of topiramate. Clin. Pharmacokinet. 43:763-780 (2004).
- E. Perucca, J. French and M. Bialer. Developing novel antiepileptic drugs (AEDs): Challenges, incentives and recent advances. Lancet Neurol., 6:793-804 (2007).
- M. Bialer, S.J. Johannessen, H.J. Kupferberg, R.H. Levy, E. Perucca and T. Tomson: Progress report on new antiepileptic drugs: A summary of the Eight Eilat Conference (EILAT VIII). Epilepsy Res.73:1-52 (2007).
- M. Bialer. Generic products of antiepileptic drugs (AEDs): Is it an issue? Epilepsia, 48:1825-1832 (2007).
- M. Bialer, H. S. White. Key factors in the discovery and development of new antiepileptic drugs (AEDs). Nature Rev. Drug Discov. 9: 68-83 (2010).
- H. S. White, A. B. Alex, A. Pollock, N. Hen, T. Shekh-Ahmed, K. S. Wilcox, J. H. McDonough, J. P. Stables, D. Kaufmann, B. Yagen, B. Bialer. A new derivative of valproic acid amide possesses a broad-spectrum antiseizure profile and unique activity against status epilepticus and organophosphate neuronal damage. Epilepsia 53:134-146 (2012)
- M. Bialer. Chemical properties of antiepileptic drugs (AEDs). Adv. Drug Deliv. Rev. 64: 887-895 (2012).
- M. Bialer, P. Soares-da-Silva. Pharmacokinetics and drug interactions of eslicarbazepine acetate. Epilepsia.53: 935-946 (2012).
- M. Bialer, E. Perucca. Does Cannabidiol Have Antiseizure Activity Independent of its Interactions with Clobazam? An Appraisal of the Evidence from Randomized Controlled Trials. Epilepsia, 61: 1082-1089 (2020)
- R. Odi, D. Bibi, T. Wager, M. Bialer. A Perspective into the physicochemical and biopharmaceutic properties of marketed antiepileptic drugs - from phenobarbital to cenobamate and beyond. Epilepsia, 61:1543-1552 (2020).
- R. Odi, V. Franco, E. Perucca, M. Bialer. A perspective on bioequivalence and switchability of generic AED products. Epilepsia 62: 285-302 (2021).
- R. Odi, R.W. Invernizzi, T. Gallily, E. Perucca, M. Bialer. Fenfluramine repurposing from weight loss to epilepsy; what we do and do not know. Pharmacol Ther.226, 107866 (2021).
- M. Bilaer, E. Perucca. Lorcaserin for Dravet Syndrome- A potential advance over fenfluramine? CNS Drugs, 21:115-122 (2022).
