= Lyndsey Gough =

American sports reporter (born 1993)

- Born: June 19, 1993 (age 33); Sturgis, Kentucky, U.S.
- Education: University of Kentucky
- Occupation: Sports Anchor/Reporter
- Employer: WKYT-TV

Lyndsey Gough (born June 19, 1993) is currently on-air sports anchor at WKYT-TV in Lexington, Kentucky after being a sports anchor and sports director at WTOC-TV in Savannah, Georgia.

== Early life and college ==
A native of Sturgis, Kentucky, Gough graduated from the University of Kentucky in 2015 majoring in broadcast journalism and minoring in communications. She interned for the John Calipari Pro Camps and ESPN Lexington, as well as worked for the university's athletic department her senior year and wrote for Wildcat Blue Nation website.

== Career ==
Before arriving in Savannah, Gough was on air in Bowling Green, Kentucky, at WBKO-TV for a year and in Louisville, Kentucky for two years. During her time in Louisville, She uncovered text messages between then Louisville head coach Rick Pitino and Jim Gatto, global marketing director of basketball at Adidas during the 2017–18 NCAA Division I men's basketball corruption scandal, where Pitino was asking Gatto for a pair of Yeezys. The scandal caused Pitino to be fired. While covering the 2021 Georgia–Clemson game, Gough said she was harassed by the crowd after the game, drawing both criticism and support. She came back to Lexington to work at WKYT-TV in the fall of 2022.

== Personal life ==
While covering the RBC Heritage golf tournament in Hilton Head Island, South Carolina, one of the first sports events in the country began reopening from the COVID-19 pandemic, she tested positive for COVID. She ended up seeking care in an emergency room for the disease and ultimately spent 11 days in the hospital. She had to have her appendix removed, along with part of her colon. She documented her COVID experience on Social Media.

Gough is a fan of all University of Kentucky sports, the Dallas Cowboys, St. Louis Cardinals, and Los Angeles Lakers.
