= Albert Balows =

American microbiologist (1921–2006)

Albert Balows (January 3, 1921, Denver, Colorado – September 23, 2006, Fulton County, Georgia) was an American clinical microbiologist. He was the president of the American Society for Microbiology in 1981.

== Biography ==
He had a brother and two sisters and his parents were Jewish immigrants to the United States from Russia. Albert Balows grew up in Colorado Springs, Colorado and graduated from Palmer High School. He graduated in 1942 with a B.A. in biology from Colorado College. From 1943 to 1946 he served in the United States Army Medical Corps and participated in the 1944–1945 military campaign of Patton's 3rd Army. Balows graduated in 1948 with an M.S. in microbiology from Syracuse University and in 1952 with a Ph.D. in microbiology from the University of Kentucky. At the University of Kentucky, his mentor was Ralph Holder Weaver (1903–1973). From 1952 to 1969 Balows worked as a clinical microbiologist at the Saint Joseph Hospital in Lexington, Kentucky. He supervised both the hospital's clinical microbiology and the transfusion medicine services. In 1960 he was appointed an associate professor of medicine at the University of Kentucky Medical Center, where he taught, directed the center's clinical microbiology laboratory, and established a research program. In 1969 he moved to the Atlanta area to join the staff of the Centers for Disease Control (CDC). He worked as the CDC's director of the bacteriology division from 1969 to 1981 and then as the CDC's assistant director of laboratory science from 1981 to 1988, when he retired. He worked with the World Health Organization and travelled the globe in connection with his career.

Balows was from 1974 to 1979 editor-in-chief of the Journal of Clinical Microbiology and served on the editorial boards of 12 journals. He did research on AIDS, toxic shock syndrome, Legionnaires' disease, Ebola virus, group B streptococci, Histoplasma capsulatum, and other problems in public health. He was the author of more than 95 book chapters and the author or coauthor of numerous article in scientific journals. He and his colleagues planned countermeasures against, and provided surveillance for, possible bioterrorist activity at the 1984 Summer Olympics, and helped to evaluate the safety of the White House's water supply and how to safeguard it against bioterrorism.

Balows was elected in 1971 a fellow of the American Association for the Advancement of Science. He received in 1981 the Becton Dickinson award in clinical microbiology, in 1983 the Silver Medallion for outstanding contributions to clinical microbiology from the Italian Society of Microbiology (Società Italiana di Microbiologia), in 1990 the Abbott Laboratories award for development of rapid laboratory diagnostic techniques, and in 1999 the bioMérieux Sonnenwirth award for exemplary leadership in clinical microbiology.

In October 1956 he married Patricia Ann Barker (1932–2017). They had a daughter and a son.

== Selected publications ==
=== Articles ===
- Furcolow, Michael L.; Balows, A.; Menges, R. W.; Pickar, D.; McClellan, J. T.; Saliba, A. (1966). "Blastomycosis: An important medical problem in the central United States". JAMA. 198 (5): 529–532. doi:10.1001/jama.1966.03110180073022. PMID 5953275.
- McNamara, M. J.; Hill, M. C.; Balows, A.; Tucker, E. B. (1967). "A Study of the Bacteriologic Patterns of Hospital Infections". Annals of Internal Medicine. 66 (3): 480–488. doi:10.7326/0003-4819-66-3-480. PMID 5226878.
- Furcolow, M.L.; Watson, K.A.; Tisdall, O.F.; Julian, W.A.; Saliba, N.A.; Balows, Albert (1968). "Some Factors Affecting Survival in Systemic Blastomycosis". Diseases of the Chest. 54: 285–291. doi:10.1378/chest.54.Supplement_1.285. PMID 5677656.
- Layne, Porter; Hu, A. S. L.; Balows, Albert; Davis, Betty R. (1971). "Extrachromosomal Nature of Hydrogen Sulfide Production in Escherichia coli". Journal of Bacteriology. 106 (3): 1029–1030. doi:10.1128/jb.106.3.1029-1030.1971. PMC 248755. PMID 4934056.
- Balows, Albert; Printz, D. W. (1972). "CDC Program for Diagnosis of Gonorrhea". JAMA: The Journal of the American Medical Association. 222 (12): 1557. doi:10.1001/jama.1972.03210120051018. PMID 4678432.
- Smith, P. B.; Tomfohrde, K. M.; Rhoden, D. L.; Balows, A. (1972). "API System: A Multitube Micromethod for Identification of Enterobacteriaceae". Applied Microbiology. 24 (3): 449–452. doi:10.1128/am.24.3.449-452.1972. PMC 376540. PMID 4562482.
- Loewenstein, Matthews.; Balows, Albert; Gangarosa, Eugenej. (1973). "Turista at an International Congress in Mexico". The Lancet. 301 (7802): 529–531. doi:10.1016/S0140-6736(73)90340-1. PMID 4119960.
- Smith, P. B.; Gavan, T. L.; Isenberg, H. D.; Sonnenwirth, A.; Taylor, W. I.; Washington, J. A.; Balows, A. (1978). "Multi-Laboratory Evaluation of an Automated Microbial Detection/Identification System". Journal of Clinical Microbiology. 8 (6): 657–666. doi:10.1128/jcm.8.6.657-666.1978. PMC 275320. PMID 370141.
- Balows, A. (1979). "Bacterial hepatitis". The New England Journal of Medicine. 300 (19): 1112–1113. doi:10.1056/NEJM197905103001914. PMID 431616.
- Blaser, M. J.; Hickman, F. W.; Farmer, J. J.; Brenner, D. J.; Balows, A.; Feldman, R. A. (1980). "Salmonella typhi: The Laboratory as a Reservoir of Infection". Journal of Infectious Diseases. 142 (6): 934–938. doi:10.1093/infdis/142.6.934. PMID 7462702.
- Reeves, M. W.; Pine, L.; Neilands, J. B.; Balows, A. (1983). "Absence of siderophore activity in Legionella species grown in iron-deficient media". Journal of Bacteriology. 154 (1): 324–329. doi:10.1128/jb.154.1.324-329.1983. PMC 217462. PMID 6219988.
- Balows, Albert (1999). "Clinical Microbiology and ASM: Quo Vadis?". Journal of Clinical Microbiology. 37 (5): 1239–1241. doi:10.1128/JCM.37.5.1239-1241.1999. PMC 84739. PMID 10203463.

=== Books ===
- Starr, M. P.; Stolp, H.; Trüper, H. G.; Balows, A.; Schlegel, H. G., eds. (11 November 2013). The Prokaryotes: A Handbook on Habitats, Isolation and Identification of Bacteria. ISBN 9783662131879. (pbk reprint of 1981 edition)
- Balows, Albert; Sonnenwirth, Alex C., eds. (1983). Bacteremia: laboratory and clinical aspects. Charles C. Thomas. ISBN 039804807X.
