= Lewis and Clark Community College =

Public college in Godfrey, Illinois, US

Coordinates: 38°57′6.2″N 90°11′39.4″W

- Type: Public community college
- Established: 1970
- President: Ken Trzaska
- Total staff: 500
- Students: 3,973 (Fall 2022)
- Location: Main campus in Godfrey, Illinois, United States
- Campus: Multiple campuses
- Nickname: Trailblazers
- Athletic affiliation: NJCAA - Mid-West Athletic Conference
- Website: www.lc.edu

Lewis and Clark Community College is a public community college in Godfrey, Illinois. It serves approximately 3,973 credit and non-credit students annually. The college has nine locations throughout the St. Louis Metro East, including a campus and humanities center in Edwardsville, Illinois; community education centers in Alton, Illinois, Carlinville, Illinois and Jerseyville, Illinois; a training center in Bethalto, Illinois; a river research center in East Alton, Illinois; and a location at the East St. Louis Higher Education Center in East St. Louis, Illinois. Lewis and Clark community college has career and transfer study options. The college also offers personal enrichment programming for adults and children, as well as corporate and safety training options for professionals.

== Campuses ==
The main campus is in Godfrey, Illinois on the grounds of the former Monticello College, the second oldest women's college in America. It started as a women's seminary established in 1838. In 1970, the newly established Lewis and Clark Community College District purchased the grounds, buildings and faculty. L&C began offering classes in 1970. Many of the original buildings are still used, and a gymnasium, math and science complex, nursing building and welding facility have been added since. The N.O. Nelson campus (named after N.O. Nelson, founder of the village of Leclaire, Illinois) is located in Edwardsville, Illinois.

Two floors of the Main Complex were closed in September 2021 because of maintenance issues. As of June 2023, renovations on the Main Complex are being planned.

== Academics ==
Lewis and Clark operates a nurse-managed practice clinic to help underserved members of the community receive affordable healthcare. The Lewis and Clark Family Health Clinic was one of the winners of the 2010 MetLife Foundation Community College Excellence Award, and received a $50,000 grant in the spring of 2010.

In October 2010, the college, in conjunction with the National Great Rivers Research and Education Center, the University of Illinois, and the Illinois Natural History Survey established a river research facility, the Jerry F. Costello Confluence Field Station, along the Mississippi River.

== Athletics ==
Lewis and Clark Community College competes as member of the NJCAA in the Mid-West Athletic Conference. The athletics teams - men and women's soccer, men and women's basketball, volleyball, golf, softball and baseball - are referred to as the Trailblazers.

In 1999, the Lewis and Clark Community College Women's Soccer Team won a NJCAA National Championship after they defeated Champlain, 3–1. In 2008, the Lewis and Clark Community College Women's Soccer Team defeated Darton College 3–2 to win the NJCAA National Championship.

== Sustainability ==
Lewis and Clark has signed sustainability agreements with the American College and University Presidents Climate Commitment, the Illinois Green Economy Network, the Illinois Sustainable University Commitment, and the St. Louis Higher Education Sustainability Consortium. There are various sustainability efforts on campus including energy efficient lighting, composting and sustainable landscaping.

=== Awards ===
- Green Roof Award, NGRREC (2010)
- U.S. Water Prize (2011)
- Illinois Governor's Sustainability Award (2011, 2013, 2016)
- Illinois Governor's Sustainability Compact, Gold Level (2012)

== Notable people ==
- Dale T. Chapman, former president of Lewis and Clark Community College

== Transportation ==
The main campus of Lewis and Clark Community College in Godfrey is served by Madison County Transit. Routes 1X and 10 provide bus service from campus to downtown Alton, Alton station, downtown St. Louis, and other destinations.

=== Notable alumni ===
- Barb Honchak - professional Mixed Martial Artist, inaugural Invicta FC Flyweight Champion, currently competing in the UFC
- Jason Isringhausen - Former closer for the St. Louis Cardinals

== See also ==
- Illinois Community College System
