= Ninian Edwards Gray =

American politician (1807–1859)

Ninian Edwards Gray (1807 – November 18, 1859), generally known as N. E. Gray, was an American jurist, businessman, and politician.

Son of John Gray, founder of Elkton, Kentucky and Graysville, Kentucky (now parts of Guthrie and Tiny Town). he was named for Ninian Edwards. He was a native of Christian County, Kentucky. He graduated from Yale University in 1831. Upon leaving college, he studied law in Lexington, Kentucky and graduated from the Law Department of Transylvania University. He engaged in the practice of law, and stood in the highest rank of the profession. He was active in public life. He represented his county and district in both houses of the Kentucky State Legislature, and was a member of the Convention which framed the 1850 Constitution of Kentucky. He was for many years Attorney of the State, and subsequently Judge of the Circuit Court. Gray's business activities included stage coach lines developed by his father; he had many mail contracts in south-central Kentucky and nearby parts of Tennessee.

He died in Hopkinsville, Kentucky, November 18, 1859, aged 51
