= MedStar National Rehabilitation Hospital =

Coordinates: 38°55′49.9″N 77°0′47.9″W

MedStar National Rehabilitation Network
- MedStar Health
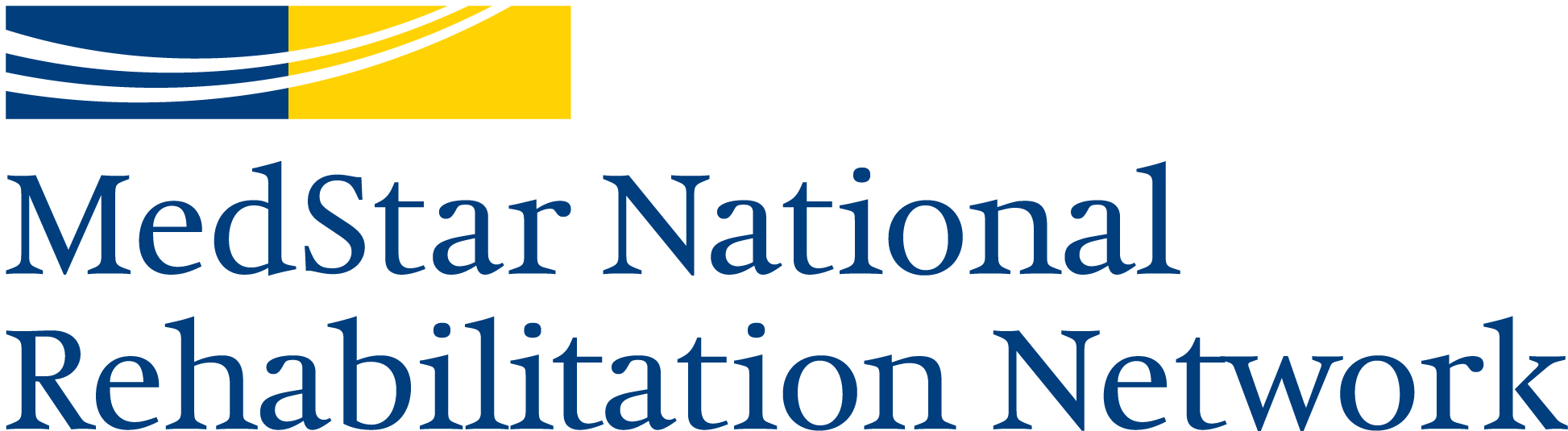

Geography
- Location: 102 Irving Street Northwest, Washington, D.C., United States

Organization
- Type: Specialized

Services
- Beds: 137

History
- Founded: 1986

Links
- Website: www.medstarnrh.org
- Lists: Hospitals in Washington, D.C.

MedStar National Rehabilitation Network (MedStar NRH) is located in Washington, D.C., and specializes in treating persons with physical disabilities. The National Rehabilitation Hospital was founded in 1986 by Edward A. Eckenhoff, and is a member of the MedStar Health system, the Washington, D.C.-Baltimore region's largest non-profit healthcare organization.

MedStar National Rehabilitation Hospital has grown from a single hospital into MedStar National Rehabilitation Network, which provides inpatient, outpatient, and day treatment programs. The network provides more than 350,000 ambulatory visits annually in addition to the hospital's more than 2,200 inpatient admissions. Since its inception, MedStar NRH has admitted in excess of 35,000 inpatients and provided over 2 million outpatient visits.

== History ==
=== Edward A. Eckenhoff ===
Eckenhoff founded the hospital in 1986 and is currently the President Emeritus of MedStar NRH. After suffering a spinal cord injury which left him paralyzed from the waist down Edward A. Eckenhoff founded the National Rehabilitation Hospital.

On February 6, 1986, MedStar NRH opened its doors with 230 staff members and one patient.

The current president is John Rockwood who adopted the role in October 2010.

== Reputation and Accreditation ==
=== Ranking ===
MedStar NRH is accredited by both the Joint Commission on Accreditation of Healthcare Organizations JCAHO, and the Commission on Accreditation of Rehabilitation Facilities CARF, earning an impressive fourteen CARF commendations in the 2007 accreditation survey. CARF is a private, not-for-profit organization that promotes quality rehabilitation services. Their standards are reviewed annually and new ones are developed to keep pace with changing conditions and current consumer needs. NRH has received a three-year accreditation from CARF, and its Spinal Cord Injury, Stroke and Brain Injury programs are the regions only CARF accredited specialty programs.

== Types of Specialty Care: Inpatient, Outpatient, and Day Treatment ==
MedStar NRH's board-certified physicians, neuropsychologists, physical therapists, occupational therapists, speech-language pathologists, psychologists, vocational rehabilitation counselors, and other clinicians work in teams to meet the needs of patients with a wide range of neurological, and orthopedic conditions. The MedStar NRH provides highly specialized acute inpatient rehabilitative care at its Washington, D.C., location on a campus adjacent to its MedStar Health sister hospital, the MedStar Washington Hospital Center. NRH works in partnership not only with the MedStar Washington Hospital Center, but also with a number of other leading acute care facilities throughout the region. Acute rehab begins at onset of injury and illness, and continues after hospitalization through the NRH Rehabilitation Network – with over 50 outpatient sites located throughout the Washington, D.C., Northern Virginia, and Maryland region.

In addition, for those needing more intense therapy following hospitalization, MedStar NRH offers unique Day Treatment programs for stroke, brain and spinal cord injury, which provide continued comprehensive care to maximize potential for recovery.

=== Vocational Care ===
Meant for patients who have occurred a brain injury, spinal cord injury, stroke, amputation, and burns. This program has also been accredited for treating motion disorders, arthritis, chronic pain syndromes, cardiac disorders, and other neurologic conditions. There are both inpatient and outpatient services available with each staff member certified in rehabilitation counseling (CRC).

=== Spinal Cord Injury ===
More than 200 spinal cord injured patients come to MedStar NRH each year for treatment. Some injuries MedStar NRH encounters are spinal cord disease, spinal stenosis, multiple sclerosis, postoperative spinal surgery, and Guillain Barre syndrome. Emphasis is on the prevention of primary and secondary conditions and on the patients’ participation. The Seating and Mobility Clinic offers evaluations for patients wheeled mobility needs based on functional strength, range of motion, postural alignment, and skin integrity. MedStar NRH was also one of the first hospitals in the country to use the Lokomat. This provides body weight support for gait training.

=== Brain Injury ===
Faculty provides care for thousands suffering from mild to traumatic brain injuries. The concussion clinic at Medstar NRH focuses primarily on this form of brain injury and is regarded as one of the best in the country, according to U.S. News & World Report. 75 percent of all traumatic brain injuries that occur are concussions. Traumatic brain injuries contribute to a third of all deaths in the United States with over 1.5 million brain injuries occurring each year. During their stay, patients are also educated on precautions they can take to prevent a future incidence.

=== Stroke ===
Treat inpatient and outpatient stroke victims. Over 600 stroke patients are cared for each year at MedStar NRH with 96 percent being able to return home within 90 days.

== Special Programs ==
=== CARF Accredited ===
MedStar NRH's Spinal Cord Program is the area's only CARF Accredited Specialty Program for Spinal Cord Injury and Disease.

The Rehabilitation Research and Training Center (RRTC) on Spinal Cord Injury (SCI): Promoting Health and Preventing Complications through Exercise is also funded by the NIDRR. The $4 million, 5-year grant allows MedStar NRH to further extend its research and training efforts on secondary conditions in people with SCI. The RRTC is a unique collaborative effort of national leaders in SCI-related research, clinical expertise, support and education organizations, independent living centers, and consumers with SCI.

=== Recovery Program ===
The MedStar NRH Stroke Recovery Program is among the largest programs in the country.

The MedStar NRH Brain Injury Program uses repetition to expand on small incremental gains in recovery—to achieve their outcome.

The orthopedic programs at MedStar NRH utilize technological diagnostic and therapeutic equipment to address such issues as arthritis, amputation, joint replacement, and a full range of other orthopedic injuries and conditions.

Throughout patients’ rehabilitative experience, MedStar NRH relies upon a number of assistive technology devices that have been developed by MedStar NRH's research team, and which have been used fortheir recovery.

=== National Center for Children's Rehabilitation (NCCR) ===
The National Center for Children's Rehabilitation (NCCR) at MedStar NRH addresses an unmet regional need and raises the bar for care of pediatric patients with neurological, orthopedic injuries, and other illnesses. The only center of its kind in the area, the NCCR is a joint service of MedStar NRH and Children's National Medical Center and offers an innovative approach to children's rehab in a state-of-the-art and secure unit.

== Research and technology ==
=== Christoph Ruesch Research Center ===
There are four unique centers conducting both laboratory and clinical research: the Assistive Technology Research Center, the Center for Post-Acute Studies, the Neuroscience Research Center, and the Center for Applied Biomechanics and Rehabilitation Research.

Dozens of studies are underway in the development of improved rehabilitative diagnosis and treatment methods, and technology aimed at improving long-term independence for persons with a variety of disabling conditions. Among these are a unique study to evaluate the value of activity-based rehab and FES, functional electrical stimulation, for spinal cord injury patients, a project to test the value of patient navigation to improve long-term outcomes for stroke and spinal cord patients, and a program to reduce secondary incidents among the capital region's stroke patients.

=== Four Laboratory and Research Centers ===
==== Assistive Technology & Research Center ====
Uncover new technology that increases the effectiveness of recovery. Also increases a patient's ability to live independently with a disability.

==== Center for Post-Acute Innovation & Research ====
Aims to offer guidance on the quality and financing of post-acute rehab.

==== Neuroscience Research Center ====
Congress approves 6 million dollars for new neuroscience research center in 2000. This area deals with research related to clinical psychology, speech language therapy, health services, and rehabilitation engineering.

==== Center for Applied Biomechanics and Rehabilitation Research ====
Research involving impairments, limitations, and recovery. The center focuses primarily on neurological and musculoskeletal factors.
